= List of IFK Göteborg seasons =

This is a list of the seasons played by IFK Göteborg from 1904 when the club was founded to the most recent season. IFK Göteborg has spent most of its seasons in the highest Swedish league, Allsvenskan, and has also competed in the Swedish cup competition Svenska Cupen, the early championship deciding cup Svenska Mästerskapet and all major European competitions as well as other leagues and tournaments. This list includes all achievements in those tournaments and competitions as well as the top scorer for each season.

== Key ==
	League play
Pld	Games played
W	Games won
D	Games drawn
L	Games lost
GF	Goals for
GA	Goals against
GD	Goal difference
Pts	Points
Pos	Final position

	Cups and play-offs
DNQ	Did not qualify
DNE	Did not enter
DSQ	Disqualified
QR(#)	Qualifying round (#)
PO	Preliminary round
PR	Play-off round
R#	Round #
GS	Group stage
QF	Quarter-finals
SF	Semi-finals
RU	Runners-up
W	Winners

	Cell coding (Allsvenskan)
	1st place
	2nd or 3rd place
	4th place
	Cell coding (other)
	Winners
	Runners-up
	1st place or promoted
	Relegated
—	Tournament not played

== List of seasons ==
Season	League										SM / Play-offs	Svenska Cupen	Europe / Other		Top goalscorer	
Season	Division	Pld	W	D	L	GF	GA	GD	Pts	Pos	SM / Play-offs	Svenska Cupen	Competition	Round	Name	Goals
1904	—										DNE	—	—	—	—	—
1905	Göteborgsserien kl. I	8	5	0	3	35	15	+20	10	2nd	DNE	—	—	—	Unknown	N/A
1906	Göteborgsserien kl. I	8	6	1	1	20	9	+11	13	2nd	DNE	—	—	—	Unknown	N/A
1907	Göteborgsserien kl. I	9	5	2	2	22	13	+9	12	1st	R1	—	—	—	Unknown	N/A
1908	—										W	—	—	—	Unknown	N/A
1909	—										QF	—	—	—	Erik Börjesson	5
1910	Svenska Serien	14	8	2	4	41	32	+9	18	3rd	W	—	—	—	Erik Börjesson	31
1911–12	Svenska Serien	11	4	3	4	28	27	+1	11	3rd	DNE	—	—	—	Arvid Fagrell	8
1912–13	Svenska Serien	10	7	2	1	25	9	+16	16	1st	QF	—	—	—	Erik Börjesson; Carl Olsson	9
1913–14	Svenska Serien	10	8	1	1	37	11	+26	17	1st	QF	—	—	—	Erik Börjesson	15
1914–15	Svenska Serien	8	6	0	2	25	13	+12	12	1st	R1	—	—	—	Erik Hjelm	10
1915–16	Svenska Serien	10	6	3	1	27	9	+18	15	1st	R1	—	—	—	Erik Börjesson	10
1916–17	Svenska Serien	10	8	0	2	34	8	+26	16	1st	SF	—	—	—	Erik Hjelm	15
1916–17	Svenska Serien	10	8	0	2	34	8	+26	16	1st	QF	—	—	—	Erik Hjelm	15
1918	Fyrkantserien	6	5	1	0	21	4	+17	11	1st	W	—	—	—	Erik Börjesson	19
1919	Fyrkantserien	5	3	0	2	8	6	+2	6	1st	R1	—	—	—	Herbert Karlsson	4
1920–21	Svenska Serien	18	8	4	6	39	21	+18	20	5th	SF	—	—	—	Herbert Karlsson	25
1921–22	—										R1	—	—	—	None	0
1922–23	Svenska Serien Västra	10	5	2	3	18	9	+9	12	2nd	R1	—	—	—	Erik Hjelm	5
1923–24	Svenska Serien Västra	10	4	2	4	15	17	−2	10	4th	DSQ	—	—	—	Gunnar Rydberg	6
1924–25	Allsvenskan	22	16	4	2	87	30	+57	36	2nd	DNE	—	—	—	Filip Johansson	39
1925–26	Allsvenskan	22	13	7	2	65	27	+38	33	3rd	DNE	—	—	—	Filip Johansson	26
1926–27	Allsvenskan	22	16	1	5	58	27	+31	33	2nd	—	—	—	—	Filip Johansson	21
1927–28	Allsvenskan	22	10	6	6	39	33	+6	26	4th	—	—	—	—	Gunnar Rydberg	14
1928–29	Allsvenskan	22	14	4	4	56	34	+22	32	3rd	—	—	—	—	Filip Johansson	23
1929–30	Allsvenskan	22	12	6	4	67	28	+39	30	2nd	—	—	—	—	Filip Johansson	23
1930–31	Allsvenskan	22	13	4	5	45	31	+14	30	3rd	—	—	—	—	Filip Johansson	18
1931–32	Allsvenskan	22	11	4	7	47	34	+13	26	4th	—	—	—	—	Filip Johansson	10
1932–33	Allsvenskan	22	11	3	8	58	42	+16	25	3rd	—	—	—	—	Gunnar Rydberg	10
1933–34	Allsvenskan	20	11	3	6	52	38	+14	25	3rd	—	—	—	—	Helge Johnsson	11
1934–35	Allsvenskan	22	15	3	4	48	22	+26	33	1st	—	—	—	—	Arne Nyberg	13
1935–36	Allsvenskan	22	9	7	6	36	28	+8	25	4th	—	—	—	—	Gunnar Forsberg	13
1936–37	Allsvenskan	22	8	5	9	34	41	−6	21	7th	—	—	—	—	Gustaf Werner	7
1937–38	Allsvenskan	22	6	4	12	28	35	−7	16	11th	—	—	—	—	Arne Nyberg	9
1938–39	Division 2 Västra	18	13	4	1	48	11	+37	30	1st	W	—	—	—	Arne Nyberg	19
1939–40	Allsvenskan	22	15	2	6	49	27	+22	32	2nd	—	—	—	—	Holger Bengtsson	11
1940–41	Allsvenskan	22	8	6	8	42	36	+6	22	6th	—	—	—	—	Leif Larsson	12
1941–42	Allsvenskan	22	14	3	5	48	29	+19	31	1st	—	R2	—	—	Leif Larsson	20
1942–43	Allsvenskan	22	7	10	5	46	40	+6	24	8th	—	R1	—	—	Leif Larsson	14
1943–44	Allsvenskan	22	12	3	7	69	42	+27	27	5th	—	DNE	—	—	Leif Larsson	19
1944–45	Allsvenskan	22	12	3	7	57	43	+14	27	4th	—	QF	—	—	Holger Bengtsson	18
1945–46	Allsvenskan	22	12	6	4	48	29	+19	30	3rd	—	SF	—	—	Gunnar Gren	16
1946–47	Allsvenskan	22	9	6	7	52	48	+4	24	5th	—	R2	—	—	Gunnar Gren	18
1947–48	Allsvenskan	22	9	4	9	40	33	+7	22	5th	—	DNE	—	—	Gunnar Gren	8
1948–49	Allsvenskan	22	9	5	8	36	33	+3	23	6th	—	DNE	—	—	Holger Bengtsson; Lennart Johansson	9
1949–50	Allsvenskan	22	5	5	12	33	49	−16	15	11th	—	DNE	—	—	Dan Ekner	12
1950–51	Division 2 Sydvästra	18	12	2	4	47	26	+21	26	1st	—	R2	—	—	Tryggve Grankvist	16
1951–52	Allsvenskan	22	10	5	7	46	37	+9	25	4th	—	QF	—	—	Reino Börjesson	13
1952–53	Allsvenskan	22	9	2	11	32	54	−22	20	9th	—	—	—	—	Sven Sjöblom	5
1953–54	Allsvenskan	22	7	8	7	23	26	−3	22	8th	—	R2	—	—	Lars Jangblad	8
1954–55	Allsvenskan	22	7	6	9	32	35	−3	20	9th	—	—	—	—	Åke Norén	13
1955–56	Allsvenskan	22	10	3	9	30	35	−5	23	6th	—	—			Bertil Johansson	12
1956–57	Allsvenskan	22	8	3	11	39	41	−2	19	9th	—	—			Harris Mattiasson	10
1957–58	Allsvenskan	33	22	3	8	92	49	+43	47	1st	—	—	European Cup	R1	Bertil Johansson	29
1959	Allsvenskan	22	14	3	5	56	28	+28	31	3rd	—	—	European Cup	R1	Owe Ohlsson	21
1960	Allsvenskan	22	7	6	9	46	49	−3	20	8th	—	—			Bertil Johansson	17
1961	Allsvenskan	22	11	4	7	62	47	+15	26	3rd	—	—	European Cup	PR	Bertil Johansson	20
1962	Allsvenskan	22	10	4	8	46	32	+14	24	3rd	—	—			Bertil Johansson	18
1963	Allsvenskan	22	11	4	7	52	31	+21	26	5th	—	—			Bertil Johansson	13
1964	Allsvenskan	22	8	2	12	31	46	−15	18	9th	—	—			Bertil Johansson	10
1965	Allsvenskan	22	9	7	6	31	35	−4	25	5th	—	—			Krister Granblom	8
1966	Allsvenskan	22	12	5	5	44	33	+10	29	4th	—	—			Håkan Eklund; Bertil Johansson	8
1967	Allsvenskan	22	8	5	9	41	37	+4	21	9th	—	R3			Leif Claesson	8
1968	Allsvenskan	22	5	8	9	30	42	−12	18	9th	—	DNE			Håkan Eklund	11
1969	Allsvenskan	22	13	5	4	38	19	+19	31	1st	—	R4			Reine Almqvist	16
1970	Allsvenskan	22	6	5	11	28	36	−8	17	11th	—	GS	European Cup	R1	Reine Almqvist	9
1971	Division 2 Norra Götaland	22	12	2	8	42	30	+12	26	3rd	—	DNE			Dan Östlund	12
1972	Division 2 Södra	22	14	4	4	41	22	+19	32	2nd	—	DNQ			Dan Östlund	8
1973	Division 2 Södra	26	13	5	8	40	32	+8	31	4th	—	DNQ			Björn Ericsson	8
1974	Division 2 Södra	26	10	8	8	50	42	+8	28	5th	—	DNQ			Per-Erik Eriksson	19
1975	Division 2 Södra	26	20	3	3	72	18	+54	43	2nd	—	QF			Torbjörn Nilsson	15
1976	Division 2 Södra	26	20	4	2	68	28	+40	44	1st	—	QF			Torbjörn Nilsson	23
1977	Allsvenskan	26	9	9	8	48	49	−1	27	6th	—	R6			Reine Almqvist	17
1978	Allsvenskan	26	13	5	8	39	29	+10	31	3rd	—	W			Torbjörn Nilsson	15
1979	Allsvenskan	26	13	9	4	44	24	+20	35	2nd	—	QF	Cup Winners' Cup	QF	Torbjörn Nilsson	17
1980	Allsvenskan	26	12	10	4	45	26	+19	34	3rd	—	R6	UEFA Cup	R1	Torbjörn Nilsson	19
1981	Allsvenskan	26	15	6	5	40	30	+10	36	2nd	—	W	UEFA Cup	W	Torbjörn Nilsson	31
1982	Allsvenskan	22	11	7	4	45	22	+23	29	1st	W	W	Cup Winners' Cup	R1	Dan Corneliusson	30
1983	Allsvenskan	22	11	5	6	35	19	+16	27	3rd	W	QF	European Cup	R1	Dan Corneliusson	12
1984	Allsvenskan	22	14	4	4	43	19	+24	32	1st	W	QF	European Cup	QF	Torbjörn Nilsson	22
1985	Allsvenskan	22	9	8	5	39	25	+14	26	4th	RU	RU	European Cup	SF	Torbjörn Nilsson	16
1986	Allsvenskan	22	13	5	4	44	17	+27	31	2nd	SF	R7	UEFA Cup	W	Johnny Ekström	23
1987	Allsvenskan	22	9	8	5	39	24	+15	26	3rd	W	R5	UEFA Cup	R1	Stefan Pettersson	16
1988	Allsvenskan	22	13	5	4	37	18	+19	31	2nd	SF	SF	European Cup	QF	Dan Fröberg	7
1989	Allsvenskan	22	9	4	9	34	29	+5	22	7th		SF	UEFA Cup	R1	Kennet Andersson; Klas Ingesson	10
1990	Allsvenskan	22	14	3	5	39	22	+17	45	1st	W	R4			Kaj Eskelinen	13
1991	Allsvenskan	18	9	6	3	29	14	+15	33	1st	—	W	European Cup	R2	Kennet Andersson	13
1991	Mästerskapsserien	10	6	1	3	14	10	+4	36	1st	—	W	European Cup	R2	Kennet Andersson	13
1992	Allsvenskan	18	7	2	9	25	24	+1	23	6th	—	R3	Champions League	GS	Johnny Ekström	15
1992	Mästerskapsserien	10	4	1	5	17	17	0	25	5th	—	R3	Champions League	GS	Johnny Ekström	15
1993	Allsvenskan	26	18	5	3	48	17	+31	59	1st	—	R4			Magnus Erlingmark; Mikael Martinsson	12
1994	Allsvenskan	26	16	6	4	54	28	+26	54	1st	—	SF	Champions League	QF	Mikael Martinsson	14
1995	Allsvenskan	26	12	10	4	43	20	+23	46	1st	—	R4	Champions League	QR	Mats Lilienberg	12
1996	Allsvenskan	26	17	5	4	61	23	+38	56	1st	—	R5	Champions League	GS	Andreas Andersson	25
1997	Allsvenskan	26	14	7	5	50	32	+18	49	2nd	—	QF	Champions League	GS	Andreas Andersson	14
1998	Allsvenskan	26	9	8	9	27	29	−2	35	8th	—	RU	UEFA Cup	QR2	Andreas Hermansson	13
1999	Allsvenskan	26	11	5	10	27	33	−4	38	6th	—	SF	UEFA Cup	R2	Patric Andersson	11
2000	Allsvenskan	26	12	8	6	46	33	+13	44	4th	—	QF			Gustaf Andersson	19
2001	Allsvenskan	26	12	8	6	41	31	+20	44	4th	—	—			Sebastian Henriksson	9
2002	Allsvenskan	26	8	4	14	25	39	−14	28	12th	W	QF	UEFA Cup	QR	Tomas Rosenkvist	11
2003	Allsvenskan	26	10	7	9	37	38	+9	37	7th	—	QF			Patric Andersson	8
2004	Allsvenskan	26	14	5	7	33	20	+13	47	3rd	—	RU	Royal League	RU	Peter Ijeh	15
2005	Allsvenskan	26	14	7	5	38	22	+16	49	2nd	—	R4	UEFA Intertoto Cup	R3	Stefan Selaković	18
2005	Allsvenskan	26	14	7	5	38	22	+16	49	2nd	—	R4	Royal League	QF	Stefan Selaković	18
2006	Allsvenskan	26	9	9	8	39	36	+3	36	8th	—	R3	UEFA Cup	QR1	Marcus Berg; Stefan Selaković; Pontus Wernbloom	6
2007	Allsvenskan	26	14	7	5	45	23	+22	49	1st	—	RU			Marcus Berg	18
2008	Allsvenskan	30	15	9	6	50	26	+24	54	3rd	—	W	Champions League	QR2	Pontus Wernbloom	13
2008	Allsvenskan	30	15	9	6	50	26	+24	54	3rd	—	W	Svenska Supercupen	W	Pontus Wernbloom	13
2009	Allsvenskan	30	17	6	7	53	24	+29	57	2nd	—	RU	Europa League	QR3	Tobias Hysén	22
2009	Allsvenskan	30	17	6	7	53	24	+29	57	2nd	—	RU	Svenska Supercupen	RU	Tobias Hysén	22
2010	Allsvenskan	30	10	10	10	42	29	+13	40	7th	—	R4	Europa League	QR3	Tobias Hysén	11
2010	Allsvenskan	30	10	10	10	42	29	+13	40	7th	—	R4	Svenska Supercupen	RU	Tobias Hysén	11
2011	Allsvenskan	30	13	6	11	42	34	+8	45	7th	—	SF			Tobias Hysén	18
2012	Allsvenskan	30	9	12	9	36	41	−5	39	7th	—	W			Hannes Stiller	7
2013	Allsvenskan	30	16	6	8	49	31	+18	54	3rd	—	QF	Europa League	QR2	Tobias Hysén	22
2013	Allsvenskan	30	16	6	8	49	31	+18	54	3rd	—	QF	Svenska Supercupen	RU	Tobias Hysén	22
2014	Allsvenskan	30	15	11	4	58	34	+24	56	2nd	—	W	Europa League	QR3	Lasse Vibe	29
2015	Allsvenskan	30	18	9	3	52	22	+30	63	2nd	—	GS	Europa League	QR3	Lasse Vibe	13
2015	Allsvenskan	30	18	9	3	52	22	+30	63	2nd	—	GS	Svenska Supercupen	RU	Lasse Vibe	13
2016	Allsvenskan	30	14	8	8	56	47	+9	50	4th	—	QF	Europa League	PO	Tobias Hysén	14
2017	Allsvenskan	30	9	10	11	42	40	+2	37	10th	—	QF			Mikael Boman	11
2018	Allsvenskan	30	9	4	17	38	53	−15	31	11th	—	GS			Giorgi Kharaishvili; Elías Már Ómarsson	9
2019	Allsvenskan	30	13	9	8	46	31	+15	48	7th	—	W			Robin Söder	14
2020	Allsvenskan	30	7	13	10	35	41	−6	34	12th	—	GS	Europa League	QR2	Patrik Karlsson Lagemyr; Tobias Sana	6
2021	Allsvenskan	30	11	8	11	42	39	+3	41	8th	—	QF			Marcus Berg	10
2022	Allsvenskan	30	14	3	13	42	39	+3	45	8th	—	GS			Marcus Berg	14
2023	Allsvenskan	30	8	10	12	33	37	−4	34	13th	—	GS			Marcus Berg	7
2024	Allsvenskan	30	7	10	13	33	43	−10	31	13th	—	SF			Paulos Abraham	7
2025	Allsvenskan	30	16	3	11	41	33	+8	51	4th	—	QF			Max Fenger	15
