= 1903 in Swedish football =

The 1903 season in Swedish football, starting January 1903 and ending December 1903:

== Honours ==
=== Official titles ===
Title	Team	Reason
Swedish Champions 1903	Göteborgs IF	Winners of Svenska Mästerskapet

=== Competitions ===
Level	Competition	Team
Regional league	Svenska Bollspelsförbundets serie kl. 1 1903	IFK Uppsala
Regional league	Svenska Bollspelsförbundets serie kl. 2 1903	AIK 2
Championship Cup	Svenska Mästerskapet 1903	Göteborgs IF
Cup competition	Kamratmästerskapen 1903	IFK Stockholm
Cup competition	Svenska Fotbollpokalen 1903 I	Örgryte IS
Cup competition	Svenska Fotbollpokalen 1903 II	Örgryte IS

== Promotions, relegations and qualifications ==
=== Promotions ===
Promoted from	Promoted to	Team	Reason
Svenska Bollspelsförbundets serie kl. 2 1903	Sv. Bollspelsförbundets tävlingsserie kl. 1 1904	Mariebergs IK	Unknown
Svenska Bollspelsförbundets serie kl. 2 1903	Sv. Bollspelsförbundets tävlingsserie kl. 1 1904	Stockholms IK	Unknown
Unknown	Sv. Bollspelsförbundets tävlingsserie kl. 1 1904	IFK Norrköping	Unknown
Unknown	Sv. Bollspelsförbundets tävlingsserie kl. 1 1904	IFK Stockholm	Unknown
Unknown	Sv. Bollspelsförbundets tävlingsserie kl. 2 1904	IF Drott	Unknown
Unknown	Sv. Bollspelsförbundets tävlingsserie kl. 2 1904	Stockholms IK 2	Unknown
Unknown	Sv. Bollspelsförbundets tävlingsserie kl. 2 1904	Södermalms IK	Unknown
Unknown	Sv. Bollspelsförbundets tävlingsserie kl. 2 1904	Westermalms IF	Unknown
Unknown	Seniorserien 1904	GAIS	Unknown
Unknown	Seniorserien 1904	Örgryte IS	Unknown
Unknown	Seniorserien 1904	Örgryte IS 2	Unknown

=== Relegations ===
Relegated from	Relegated to	Team	Reason
Svenska Bollspelsförbundets serie kl. 1 1903	Unknown	Djurgårdens IF	Withdrew
Svenska Bollspelsförbundets serie kl. 1 1903	Unknown	Djurgårdens IF 2	Withdrew
Svenska Bollspelsförbundets serie kl. 2 1903	Unknown	IFK Stockholm 2	Unknown
Svenska Bollspelsförbundets serie kl. 2 1903	Unknown	Östermalms SK	Unknown

== Domestic results ==
=== Svenska Bollspelsförbundets serie klass 1 1903 ===
	Team	Pld	W	D	L	GF		GA	GD	Pts
=1	IFK Uppsala	3	2	1	0	7	–	3	+4	5
=1	Östermalms IF	3	2	1	0	6	–	2	+4	5
3	IF Swithiod	3	1	0	2	3	–	5	-2	2
4	IF Sleipner	3	0	0	3	1	–	7	-6	0
–	Djurgårdens IF	2	2	0	0	3	–	0	+3	4
–	Djurgårdens IF 2	2	0	0	2	0	–	4	-4	0
–	AIK	2	0	0	2	1	–	11	-10	0

Title-deciding match

IFK Uppsala	2–1	Östermalms IF

?, ?

=== Svenska Bollspelsförbundets serie klass 2 1903 ===
	Team	Pld	W	D	L	GF		GA	GD	Pts
1	AIK 2	8	6	1	1	22	–	6	+16	13
2	Mariebergs IK	8	5	3	0	21	–	4	+17	13
3	IFK Stockholm 2	7	5	0	2	20	–	11	+9	10
4	Norrmalms SK	7	2	3	2	9	–	7	+2	7
5	Stockholms IK	7	2	2	3	10	–	9	+1	6
6	IK Göta	8	3	0	5	12	–	22	-10	6
7	IK Svea	6	1	3	2	3	–	7	-4	5
8	Östermalms SK	7	1	0	6	2	–	18	-16	2
9	Idrottsklubben	6	1	0	5	6	–	21	-15	2

=== Svenska Mästerskapet 1903 ===
Final

August 2, 1903

Göteborgs IF	5–2	Göteborgs FF

Idrottsplatsen, Gothenburg

=== Kamratmästerskapen 1903 ===
Final

October 4, 1903

IFK Stockholm	3–1	IFK Köping

Nedre hamn, Eskilstuna

=== Svenska Fotbollpokalen 1903 I ===
Final

June 1, 1903

Boldklubben af 1893	6–0	Örgryte IS

?, Stockholm

=== Svenska Fotbollpokalen 1903 II ===
Final

September 20, 1903

Örgryte IS	2–1	IFK Stockholm

Idrottsparken, Stockholm
