= List of Swedish football champions =

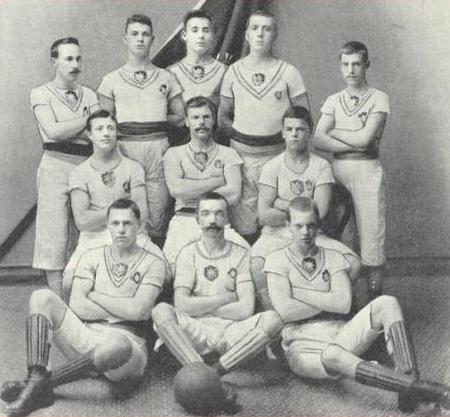
Örgryte IS in 1896, the first Swedish football champions

Swedish football champions (Swedish: Svenska mästare i fotboll) is a title held by the winners of the highest Swedish football league played each year, Allsvenskan. Malmö FF are the holders of the record of most titles with 24 Swedish championships, the most recent of which was won in 2024. The title has been contested since 1896 in various competition formats. The first Swedish Champions, Örgryte IS, were declared in 1896 when the club won the cup tournament Svenska Mästerskapet. This happened before there existed any Swedish national association, which was created in 1904. The winners of Svenska Mästerskapet between 1896 and 1904 have retroactively been declared holders of the title by the Swedish Football Association (SvFF). After the creation of the SvFF, the title continued to be held by the winners of Svenska Mästerskapet until 1925, even though a Swedish first national league, Svenska Serien, started in 1910. Svenska Mästerskapet was discontinued in 1925.

In 1924–25, a new Swedish national league was created, Allsvenskan, but the Swedish Champions title was not awarded to the winners of that league until 1930–31. Since then, the winners of Allsvenskan are considered Swedish Champions, with a few exceptions. Between 1982 and 1990, the title was given to the winners of a play-off held after Allsvenskan was finished, and the following two years, 1991 and 1992, the title was given to the winners of Mästerskapsserien, a continuation league with the best teams from Allsvenskan.

The current trophy, Lennart Johanssons Pokal, has been awarded since 2001, with Hammarby IF being the first winners. Johansson himself handed out the trophy in Sundsvall on 27 October 2001. The first trophy which was in use from 1904 to 2000 was named von Rosen's Pokal after the first chairman of the Swedish FA Clarence von Rosen. However, in November 2000 it was discovered that von Rosen had been active in the Swedish national socialist movement during World War II which prompted the FA to give up using the old trophy.

== Champions ==
Key
^{†}	Champions also won Svenska Cupen during the same season
(n)	Number of championship titles and runners-up by each club.

=== Svenska Mästerskapet (1896–1925) ===
Year	Champions	Runners-up
1896	Örgryte IS (1)	IS Idrottens Vänner (1)
1897	Örgryte IS (2)	Örgryte IS 2 (Note: Örgryte IS 2 was the reserve team of Örgryte IS.) (1)
1898	Örgryte IS (3)	AIK (1)
1899	Örgryte IS (4)	Göteborgs FF (1)
1900	AIK (1)	Örgryte IS (2)
1901	AIK (2) (Note: AIK won the final on walkover as the match could not be played due to darkness. AIK was considered to be the better team because they had already beaten Örgrytes main team in the semi-final and were thus given the title.)	Örgryte IS 2 (3)
1902	Örgryte IS (5)	Jönköpings AIF (1)
1903	Göteborgs IF (1)	Göteborgs FF (2)
1904	Örgryte IS (6)	Djurgårdens IF (1)
1905	Örgryte IS (7)	IFK Stockholm (1)
1906	Örgryte IS (8)	Djurgårdens IF (2)
1907	Örgryte IS (9)	IFK Uppsala (1)
1908	IFK Göteborg (1)	IFK Uppsala (2)
1909	Örgryte IS (10)	Djurgårdens IF (3)
1910	IFK Göteborg (2)	Djurgårdens IF (4)
1911	AIK (3)	IFK Uppsala (3)
1912	Djurgårdens IF (1) (Note: Decided in the third match after draws in the previous two.)	Örgryte IS (4)
1913	Örgryte IS (11)	Djurgårdens IF (5)
1914	AIK (4)	Hälsingborgs IF (1)
1915	Djurgårdens IF (2)	Örgryte IS (5)
1916	AIK (5)	Djurgårdens IF (6)
1917	Djurgårdens IF (3)	AIK (2)
1918	IFK Göteborg (3)	Hälsingborgs IF (2)
1919	GAIS (1)	Djurgårdens IF (7)
1920	Djurgårdens IF (4)	IK Sleipner (1)
1921	IFK Eskilstuna (1)	IK Sleipner (2)
1922	GAIS (2)	Hammarby IF (1)
1923	AIK (6)	IFK Eskilstuna (1)
1924	Fässbergs IF (1) (Note: Not decided until the spring 1925 due to heavy rain the autumn 1924.)	IK Sirius (1)
1925	Brynäs IF (1)	BK Derby (1)

=== Allsvenskan (1931–1981) ===
Year	Champions	Runners-up	Top scorer (club)	Goals
1930–31	GAIS (3)	AIK	John Nilsson (GAIS)	26
1931–32	AIK (7)	Örgryte IS	Carl-Erik Holmberg (Örgryte IS)	29
1932–33	Hälsingborgs IF (1)	GAIS	Torsten Bunke (Hälsingborgs IF)	21
1933–34	Hälsingborgs IF (2)	GAIS	Sven Jonasson (IF Elfsborg)	20
1934–35	IFK Göteborg (4)	AIK	Harry Andersson (IK Sleipner)	23
1935–36	IF Elfsborg (1)	AIK	Sven Jonasson (IF Elfsborg)	24
1936–37	AIK (8)	IK Sleipner	Olle Zethlerlund (AIK)	23
1937–38	IK Sleipner (1)	Hälsingborgs IF	Curt Hjelm (IK Sleipner)	13
1938–39	IF Elfsborg (2)	AIK	Erik Persson (AIK); Ove Andersson (Malmö FF); Yngve Lindgren (Örgryte IS)	16
1939–40	IF Elfsborg (3)	IFK Göteborg	Anders Pålsson (Hälsingborgs IF)	17
1940–41	Hälsingborgs IF (3)^{†}	Degerfors IF	Stig Nyström (IK Brage)	17
1941–42	IFK Göteborg (5)	GAIS	Sven Jacobsson (GAIS)	20
1942–43	IFK Norrköping (1)^{†}	IF Elfsborg	Gunnar Nordahl (Degerfors IF)	16
1943–44	Malmö FF (1)^{†}	IF Elfsborg	Leif Larsson (IFK Göteborg)	19
1944–45	IFK Norrköping (2)^{†}	IF Elfsborg	Gunnar Nordahl (IFK Norrköping)	27
1945–46	IFK Norrköping (3)	Malmö FF	Gunnar Nordahl (IFK Norrköping)	25
1946–47	IFK Norrköping (4)	AIK	Gunnar Gren (IFK Göteborg)	18
1947–48	IFK Norrköping (5)	Malmö FF	Gunnar Nordahl (IFK Norrköping)	18
1948–49	Malmö FF (2)	Hälsingborgs IF	Carl-Johan Franck (Hälsingborgs IF)	19
1949–50	Malmö FF (3)	Jönköpings Södra IF	Ingvar Rydell (Malmö FF)	22
1950–51	Malmö FF (4)^{†}	Råå IF	Hasse Jeppson (Djurgårdens IF)	17
1951–52	IFK Norrköping (6)	Malmö FF	Karl-Alfred Jacobsson (GAIS)	17
1952–53	Malmö FF (5)^{†}	IFK Norrköping	Karl-Alfred Jacobsson (GAIS)	24
1953–54	GAIS (4)	Hälsingborgs IF	Karl-Alfred Jacobsson (GAIS)	21
1954–55	Djurgårdens IF (5)	Halmstads BK	Kurt Hamrin (AIK)	22
1955–56	IFK Norrköping (7)	Malmö FF	Sylve Bengtsson (Halmstads BK)	22
1956–57	IFK Norrköping (8)	Malmö FF	Harry Bild (IFK Norrköping)	19
1957–58	IFK Göteborg (6)	IFK Norrköping	Bertil Johansson (IFK Göteborg); Henry Källgren (IFK Norrköping)	27
1959	Djurgårdens IF (6)	IFK Norrköping	Rune Börjesson (Örgryte IS)	21
1960	IFK Norrköping (9)	IFK Malmö	Rune Börjesson (Örgryte IS)	24
1961	IF Elfsborg (4)	IFK Norrköping	Bertil Johansson (IFK Göteborg)	20
1962	IFK Norrköping (10)	Djurgårdens IF	Leif Skiöld (Djurgårdens IF)	21
1963	IFK Norrköping (11)	Degerfors IF	Lars Heinermann (Degerfors IF); Bo Larsson (Malmö FF)	17
1964	Djurgårdens IF (7)	Malmö FF	Krister Granbom (Hälsingborgs IF)	22
1965	Malmö FF (6)	IF Elfsborg	Bo Larsson (Malmö FF)	28
1966	Djurgårdens IF (8)	IFK Norrköping	Ove Kindvall (IFK Norrköping)	20
1967	Malmö FF (7)^{†}	Djurgårdens IF	Dag Szepanski (Malmö FF)	22
1968	Östers IF (1)	Malmö FF	Ove Eklund (Åtvidabergs FF)	16
1969	IFK Göteborg (7)	Malmö FF	Reine Almqvist (IFK Göteborg)	16
1970	Malmö FF (8)	Åtvidabergs FF	Bo Larsson (Malmö FF)	16
1971	Malmö FF (9)	Åtvidabergs FF	Roland Sandberg (Åtvidabergs FF)	17
1972	Åtvidabergs FF (1)	AIK	Ralf Edström (Åtvidabergs FF); Roland Sandberg (Åtvidabergs FF)	16
1973	Åtvidabergs FF (2)	Östers IF	Jan Mattsson (Östers IF)	20
1974	Malmö FF (10)^{†}	AIK	Jan Mattsson (Östers IF)	22
1975	Malmö FF (11)^{†}	Östers IF	Jan Mattsson (Östers IF)	31
1976	Halmstads BK (1)	Malmö FF	Rutger Backe (Halmstads BK)	21
1977	Malmö FF (12)	IF Elfsborg	Reine Almqvist (IFK Göteborg); Mats Aronsson (Landskrona BoIS)	15
1978	Östers IF (2)	Malmö FF	Tommy Berggren (Djurgårdens IF)	19
1979	Halmstads BK (2)	IFK Göteborg	Mats Werner (Hammarby IF)	14
1980	Östers IF (3)	Malmö FF	Billy Ohlsson (Hammarby IF)	19
1981	Östers IF (4)	IFK Göteborg	Torbjörn Nilsson (IFK Göteborg)	20

=== Allsvenskan play-offs (1982–1990) ===
Year	Champions	Runners-up	Top scorer (club)	Goals
1982	IFK Göteborg (8)^{†} League champions: IFK Göteborg	Hammarby IF	Dan Corneliusson (IFK Göteborg)	12
1983	IFK Göteborg (9)^{†} League champions: AIK	Östers IF	Thomas Ahlström (IF Elfsborg)	16
1984	IFK Göteborg (10); League champions: IFK Göteborg	IFK Norrköping	Billy Ohlsson (Hammarby IF)	14
1985	Örgryte IS (12); League champions: Malmö FF	IFK Göteborg	Sören Börjesson (Örgryte IS); Peter Karlsson (Kalmar FF); Billy Lansdowne (Kalmar FF)	10
1986	Malmö FF (13)^{†} League champions: Malmö FF	AIK	Johnny Ekström (IFK Göteborg)	13
1987	IFK Göteborg (11); League champions: Malmö FF	Malmö FF	Lasse Larsson (Malmö FF)	19
1988	Malmö FF (14); League champions: Malmö FF	Djurgårdens IF	Martin Dahlin (Malmö FF)	17
1989	IFK Norrköping (12); League champions: Malmö FF	Malmö FF	Jan Hellström (IFK Norrköping)	16
1990	IFK Göteborg (12); League champions: IFK Göteborg	IFK Norrköping	Kaj Eskelinen (IFK Göteborg)	10

=== Mästerskapsserien (1991–1992) ===
Year	Champions	Runners-up	Top scorer (club)	Goals
1991	IFK Göteborg (13)^{†} League champions: IFK Göteborg	IFK Norrköping	Kennet Andersson (IFK Göteborg)	13
1992	AIK (9); League champions: IFK Norrköping	IFK Norrköping	Hans Eklund (Östers IF)	16

=== Allsvenskan (1993–present) ===
Allsvenskan champions since 1993
Season	Champions	Runners-up	Third place	Top scorer (club)	Goals
1993	IFK Göteborg (14)	IFK Norrköping	AIK	Henrik Bertilsson (Halmstads BK); Mats Lilienberg (Trelleborgs FF)	18
1994	IFK Göteborg (15)	Örebro SK	Malmö FF	Niclas Kindvall (IFK Norrköping)	23
1995	IFK Göteborg (16)	Helsingborgs IF	Halmstads BK	Niklas Skoog (Västra Frölunda IF)	17
1996	IFK Göteborg (17)	Malmö FF	Helsingborgs IF	Andreas Andersson (IFK Göteborg)	19
1997	Halmstads BK (3)	IFK Göteborg	Malmö FF	Mats Lilienberg (Halmstads BK); Christer Mattiasson (IF Elfsborg); Dan Sahlin (Örebro SK)	14
1998	AIK (10)	Helsingborgs IF	Hammarby IF	Arild Stavrum (Helsingborgs IF)	18
1999	Helsingborgs IF (4)	AIK	Halmstads BK	Marcus Allbäck (Örgryte IS)	15
2000	Halmstads BK (4)	Helsingborgs IF	AIK	Fredrik Berglund (IF Elfsborg)	18
2001	Hammarby IF (1)	Djurgårdens IF	AIK	Stefan Selaković (Halmstads BK)	15
2002	Djurgårdens IF (9)^{†}	Malmö FF	Örgryte IS	Peter Ijeh (Malmö FF)	24
2003	Djurgårdens IF (10)	Hammarby IF	Malmö FF	Niklas Skoog (Malmö FF)	22
2004	Malmö FF (15)	Halmstads BK	IFK Göteborg	Markus Rosenberg (Halmstads BK)	14
2005	Djurgårdens IF (11)^{†}	IFK Göteborg	Kalmar FF	Gunnar Heiðar Þorvaldsson (Halmstads BK)	16
2006	IF Elfsborg (5)	AIK	Hammarby IF	Ari (Kalmar FF)	15
2007	IFK Göteborg (18)	Kalmar FF	Djurgårdens IF	Marcus Berg (IFK Göteborg); Razak Omotoyossi (Helsingborgs IF)	14
2008	Kalmar FF (1)	IF Elfsborg	IFK Göteborg	Patrik Ingelsten (Kalmar FF)	19
2009	AIK (11)^{†}	IFK Göteborg	IF Elfsborg	Tobias Hysén (IFK Göteborg); Wánderson (GAIS)	18
2010	Malmö FF (16)	Helsingborgs IF	Örebro SK	Alexander Gerndt (Gefle IF / Helsingborgs IF)	20
2011	Helsingborgs IF (5)^{†}	AIK	IF Elfsborg	Mathias Ranégie (BK Häcken / Malmö FF)	21
2012	IF Elfsborg (6)	BK Häcken	Malmö FF	Majeed Waris (BK Häcken)	23
2013	Malmö FF (17)	AIK	IFK Göteborg	Imad Khalili (IFK Norrköping / Helsingborgs IF)	15
2014	Malmö FF (18)	IFK Göteborg	AIK	Lasse Vibe (IFK Göteborg)	23
2015	IFK Norrköping (13)	IFK Göteborg	AIK	Emir Kujović (IFK Norrköping)	21
2016	Malmö FF (19)	AIK	IFK Norrköping	John Owoeri (BK Häcken)	17
2017	Malmö FF (20)	AIK	Djurgårdens IF	Kalle Holmberg (IFK Norrköping); Magnus Eriksson (Djurgårdens IF)	14
2018	AIK (12)	IFK Norrköping	Malmö FF	Paulinho Guerreiro (BK Häcken)	20
2019	Djurgårdens IF (12)	Malmö FF	Hammarby IF	Mohamed Buya Turay (Djurgårdens IF)	15
2020	Malmö FF (21)	IF Elfsborg	BK Häcken	Christoffer Nyman (IFK Norrköping)	18
2021	Malmö FF (22)^{†}	AIK	Djurgårdens IF	Samuel Adegbenro (IFK Norrköping)	17
2022	BK Häcken (1)^{†}	Djurgårdens IF	Hammarby IF	Alexander Jeremejeff (BK Häcken)	22
2023	Malmö FF (23)^{†}	IF Elfsborg	BK Häcken	Isaac Kiese Thelin (Malmö FF)	16
2024	Malmö FF (24)	Hammarby IF	AIK	Nikola Vasić (IF Brommapojkarna)	17
2025	Mjällby AIF (1)	Hammarby IF	GAIS	Ibrahim Diabate (GAIS); August Priske (Djurgårdens IF)	18

== Performances ==
=== Total titles won by club ===
Titles won by club (%)
1. Malmö FF – 24 (19.2%)
2. IFK Göteborg – 18 (14.4%)
3. IFK Norrköping – 13 (10.4%)
4. AIK – 12 (9.60%)
5. Djurgårdens IF – 12 (9.60%)
6. Örgryte IS – 12 (9.60%)
7. IF Elfsborg – 6 (4.80%)
8. Helsingborgs IF – 5 (4.00%)
9. GAIS – 4 (3.20%)
10. Östers IF – 4 (3.20%)
11. Halmstads BK – 4 (3.20%)
12. Åtvidabergs FF – 2 (1.60%)
13. Other clubs – 9 (7.20%)

A total of 21 clubs have been crowned Swedish champions from Örgryte IS in 1896 until Mjällby AIF in 2025.
A total of 125 Swedish championships have been awarded. Malmö FF is the most successful club with 24 Swedish championships.

Performance by club
Club	Winners	Runners-up	Winning seasons
Malmö FF	24	16	1943–44, 1948–49, 1949–50, 1950–51, 1952–53, 1965, 1967, 1970, 1971, 1974, 1975, 1977, 1986, 1988, 2004, 2010, 2013, 2014, 2016, 2017, 2020, 2021, 2023, 2024
IFK Göteborg	18	9	1908, 1910, 1918, 1934–35, 1941–42, 1957–58, 1969, 1982, 1983, 1984, 1987, 1990, 1991, 1993, 1994, 1995, 1996, 2007
IFK Norrköping	13	11	1942–43, 1944–45, 1945–46, 1946–47, 1947–48, 1951–52, 1955–56, 1956–57, 1960, 1962, 1963, 1989, 2015
AIK	12	17	1900, 1901, 1911, 1914, 1916, 1923, 1931–32, 1936–37, 1992, 1998, 2009, 2018
Djurgårdens IF	12	12	1912, 1915, 1917, 1920, 1954–55, 1959, 1964, 1966, 2002, 2003, 2005, 2019
Örgryte IS	12	6	1896, 1897, 1898, 1899, 1902, 1904, 1905, 1906, 1907, 1909, 1913, 1985
IF Elfsborg	6	8	1935–36, 1938–39, 1939–40, 1961, 2006, 2012
Helsingborgs IF	5	9	1932–33, 1933–34, 1940–41, 1999, 2011
GAIS	4	3	1919, 1922, 1930–31, 1953–54
Östers IF	4	3	1968, 1978, 1980, 1981
Halmstads BK	4	2	1976, 1979, 1997, 2000
Åtvidabergs FF	2	2	1972, 1973
IK Sleipner	1	3	1937–38
Hammarby IF	1	5	2001
IFK Eskilstuna	1	1	1921
Kalmar FF	1	1	2008
BK Häcken	1	1	2022
Göteborgs IF	1	–	1903
Fässbergs IF	1	–	1924
Brynäs IF	1	–	1925
Mjällby AIF	1	–	2025

=== Total titles won by city ===
The 21 title-winning clubs have come from a total of 14 cities. The most successful city is Gothenburg.

Total titles won by city
City	Titles	Winning clubs
Gothenburg	36	IFK Göteborg (18), Örgryte IS (12), GAIS (4), Göteborgs IF (1), BK Häcken (1)
Stockholm	25	AIK (12), Djurgårdens IF (12), Hammarby IF (1)
Malmö	24	Malmö FF (24)
Norrköping	14	IFK Norrköping (13), IK Sleipner (1)
Borås	6	IF Elfsborg (6)
Helsingborg	5	Helsingborgs IF (5)
Växjö	4	Östers IF (4)
Halmstad	4	Halmstads BK (4)
Åtvidaberg	2	Åtvidabergs FF (2)
Eskilstuna	1	IFK Eskilstuna (1)
Hällevik	1	Mjällby AIF (1)
Kalmar	1	Kalmar FF (1)
Mölndal	1	Fässbergs IF (1)
Gävle	1	Brynäs IF (1)

=== Total titles won by county ===
The Swedish championship has been won by 21 clubs from ten counties. The most successful county is Västra Götaland.

Total titles won by county
County	Titles	Winning clubs
Västra Götaland (Note: Including the former counties Gothenburg and Bohus County and Älvsborg County.)	43	IFK Göteborg (18), Örgryte IS (12), IF Elfsborg (6), GAIS (4), Göteborgs IF (1), Fässbergs IF (1), BK Häcken (1)
Skåne (Note: Including the former county Malmöhus County.)	29	Malmö FF (24), Helsingborgs IF (5)
Stockholm	25	AIK (12), Djurgårdens IF (12), Hammarby IF (1)
Östergötland	16	IFK Norrköping (13), Åtvidabergs FF (2), IK Sleipner (1)
Kronoberg	4	Östers IF (4)
Halland	4	Halmstads BK (4)
Blekinge	1	Mjällby AIF (1)
Gävleborg	1	Brynäs IF (1)
Kalmar	1	Kalmar FF (1)
Södermanland	1	IFK Eskilstuna (1)

== See also ==
- Svenska Mästerskapet
- Allsvenskan
- Allsvenskan play-offs
- Mästerskapsserien
- Football in Sweden
- Swedish football league system
- List of Allsvenskan top scorers
- List of Swedish youth football champions

== Bibliography ==
- Nylin, Lars (2004). Den nödvändiga boken om Allsvenskan: svensk fotboll från 1896 till idag, statistik, höjdpunkter lag för lag, klassiska bilder. Sundbyberg: Semic. ISBN 91-552-3168-3.
