= 1903 Svenska Mästerskapet =

Tournament details
- Country: Sweden
- Teams: 4

Final positions
- Champions: Göteborgs IF
- Runners-up: Göteborgs FF

The 1903 Svenska Mästerskapet was the eighth season of Svenska Mästerskapet, the football Cup to determine the Swedish champions. Göteborgs IF won the tournament by defeating Göteborgs FF in the final with a 5–2 score.

== Semi-finals ==
1 August 1903

Göteborgs IF	4–3	Örgryte IS

?, Gothenburg

1 August 1903

Göteborgs FF	5–1	Krokslätts IK

?, Gothenburg

== Final ==
2 August 1903

Göteborgs IF	5–2	Göteborgs FF

Idrottsplatsen, Gothenburg
Referee: Wilhelm Friberg, Gothenburg
