= 1901 Svenska Mästerskapet =

Tournament details
- Country: Sweden
- Teams: 4

Final positions
- Champions: AIK
- Runners-up: Örgryte IS II

The 1901 Svenska Mästerskapet was the sixth season of Svenska Mästerskapet, the football Cup to determine the Swedish champions. AIK won the tournament due to Örgryte IS II leaving a walkover in the final.

== Semi-finals ==
7 September 1901

Örgryte IS II	1–0	Göteborgs IF

?, Gothenburg

8 September 1901

Örgryte IS	0–3	AIK

?, Gothenburg

== Final ==
8 September 1901

Örgryte IS II (w.o.)	v	AIK

Idrottsplatsen, Gothenburg
Referee: Wilhelm Friberg, Gothenburg
