= 1896 in Swedish football =

The 1896 season in Swedish football, starting January 1896 and ending December 1896:

== Events ==
- 8 August 1896: Örgryte IS wins the first Swedish Championship ever by beating IS Idrottens Vänner 3–0 in the final match of the competition. The title is contested in the cup tournament Svenska Mästerskapet—arranged by Svenska Idrottsförbundet—and the two Gothenburg clubs are the only competitors. The match is played on the football field of a Swedish cavalry regiment—Skånska husarregementet—garrisoned in Helsingborg.

== Honours ==
=== Official titles ===
Title	Team	Reason
Swedish Champions 1896	Örgryte IS	Winners of Svenska Mästerskapet

=== Competitions ===
Level	Competition	Team
Championship Cup	Svenska Mästerskapet 1896	Örgryte IS

== Domestic results ==
=== Svenska Mästerskapet 1896 ===
Final

8 August 1896

Örgryte IS	3–0	IS Idrottens Vänner

Skånska husarregementets plan, Helsingborg
