= 1902 Rosenska Pokalen =

Rosenska Pokalen 1902, part of the 1902 Swedish football season, was the fourth Rosenska Pokalen tournament played. 16 teams participated and 15 matches were played, the first 14 August 1902 and the last 7 September 1902. Gefle IF won the tournament ahead of runners-up Djurgårdens IF.

== Participating clubs ==

Club	Last season	First season in tournament	First season of current spell
AIK	Semi-final	1899	1899
Djurgårdens IF	Runners-up	1899	1899
IFK Eskilstuna	Did not participate	1902	1902
Gefle IF	Winners	1899	1899
Göteborgs IF	Did not participate	1902	1902
IFK Köping	Did not participate	1902	1902
Norrköpings GF	Did not participate	1902	1902
Norrköpings GK	Did not participate	1902	1902
IF Sleipner	1st round B	1900	1900
Stockholms IK	1st round	1901	1901
IK Svea	1st round	1901	1901
IF Swithiod	Semi-final	1900	1900
IF Swithiod 2	Did not participate	1902	1902
IFK Örebro	Did not participate	1902	1902
Östermalms IF	Did not participate	1902	1902
Östermalms SK	1st round B	1900	1900

== Tournament results ==
1st round

14 August 1902

IF Swithiod	2–0	IF Swithiod 2

?, Stockholm

15 August 1902

AIK	1–0	IK Svea

?, Stockholm

16 August 1902

Djurgårdens IF	4–0	Östermalms IF

?, Stockholm

17 August 1902

Göteborgs IF	2–1	Östermalms SK

?, Stockholm

17 August 1902

Gefle IF	4–0	IF Sleipner

?, Gävle

17 August 1902

IFK Eskilstuna	2–0	Stockholms IK

?, Eskilstuna

17 August 1902

Norrköpings GF	1–0	Norrköpings GK

?, Norrköping

17 August 1902

IFK Köping	w.o.	IFK Örebro

?, Köping

Quarter-finals

24 August 1902

Gefle IF	5–1	AIK

?, Stockholm

24 August 1902

Djurgårdens IF	2–0	Göteborgs IF

?, Stockholm

24 August 1902

IF Swithiod	5–0	Norrköpings GF

?, Stockholm

24 August 1902

IFK Eskilstuna	3–1	IFK Köping

?, Uppsala

Semi-finals

31 August 1902

Djurgårdens IF	2–1	IF Swithiod

?, Stockholm

31 August 1902

Gefle IF	5–0	IFK Eskilstuna

?, Stockholm

Final

7 September 1902

Gefle IF	1–0	Djurgårdens IF

Idrottsparken, Stockholm
