= 1905 Svenska Mästerskapet =

Tournament details
- Country: Sweden
- Teams: 52

Final positions
- Champions: Örgryte IS
- Runners-up: IFK Stockholm

The 1905 Svenska Mästerskapet was the tenth season of Svenska Mästerskapet, the football Cup to determine the Swedish champions. Örgryte IS won the tournament by defeating IFK Stockholm in the final with a 2–1 score.

== First qualifying round ==
4 June 1905

Väsby FK	10–2	IF Svithiod

?, Skånes Väsby

4 June 1905

GF Idrott	2–0	IS Göta

?, Landskrona

4 June 1905

IFK Helsingborg	8–0	Malmö Läroverks IF

?, Helsingborg

4 June 1905

IFK Hudiksvall	1–0	Hudiksvalls IF

?, Hudiksvall

12 June 1905

Söderhamns SK	3–5	IF Ellnar

?, Söderhamn

18 June 1905

IFK Köping	7–0	Enighet

?, Köping

18 June 1905

IFK Örebro	7–4	IFK Arboga

?, Örebro

18 June 1905

Västerås SK	3–1	IFK Västerås

?, Västerås

4 July 1905

Södermalms IK	5–2	Stockholms IK

?, Stockholm

6 July 1905

Göteborgs IF	2–1	Krokslätts IK

?, Gothenburg

7 July 1905

AIK	9–1	Westermalms IF

?, Stockholm

9 July 1905

IFK Sala	2–1	IF Norden

?, Sala

10 July 1905

IK Vikingen	3–2	GAIS

?, Gothenburg

11 July 1905

IFK Norrköping	3–1	IK Sleipner

?, Norrköping

12 July 1905

Örgryte IS	4–1	IFK Göteborg

?, Gothenburg

12 July 1905

Norrköpings GK	1–1	IK Amatören

?, Norrköping
Date unknown

Norrköpings GK	1–0	IK Amatören

?, Norrköping

14 July 1905

Mariebergs IK	9–0	Norrmalms SK

?, Stockholm

14 July 1905

Gävle SGF	1–1	IFK Gävle

?, Gävle
1 August 1905

Gävle SGF	2–0	IFK Gävle

?, Gävle

15 July 1905

Gefle IF	3–0	Sandvikens IF

?, Gävle

16 July 1905

IK Stjärnan	2–0	IF Drott (Gävle)

?, Sandviken

21 July 1905

IFK Stockholm	5–5	Djurgårdens IF

?, Stockholm
24 July 1905

IFK Stockholm	2–0	Djurgårdens IF

?, Stockholm

25 July 1905

IF Swithiod	2–1	IK Göta

?, Stockholm

1 August 1905

Östermalms IF	3–3	IFK Uppsala

?, Stockholm
4 August 1905

Östermalms IF	v	IFK Uppsala (w.o.)

?, Stockholm

6 August 1905

Verdandi VoIF (w.o.)	v	GUIF (w.o.)

?, Eskilstuna

== Second qualifying round ==
Date unknown

GF Idrott	2–0	IFK Helsingborg

?, Landskrona

8 July 1905

Gävle SGF	2–3	IK Stjärnan

?, Gävle

9 July 1905

IFK Sala	0–14	IFK Köping

?, Sala

9 July 1905

IFK Örebro	v	Västerås SK (w.o.)

?, Örebro

9 July 1905

Söderhamns IF	14–0	IF Ellnar

?, Söderhamn

9 July 1905

Strands IF	3–0	IFK Hudiksvall

?, Hudiksvall

20 July 1905

Örgryte IS	3–0	IK Vikingen

?, Gothenburg

28 July 1905

Södermalms IK	2–1	Mariebergs IK

?, Stockholm

30 July 1905

AIK	6–1	IF Swithiod

?, Stockholm

15 August 1905

IFK Stockholm	4–3	Östermalms IF

?, Stockholm

20 August 1905

IFK Norrköping	2–0	Norrköpings GK

?, Norrköping

== First round ==
27 August 1905

Örgryte IS	4–2	Göteborgs IF

?, Gothenburg

27 August 1905

Väsby FK	4–0	GF Idrott

?, Skånes Väsby

27 August 1905

Gefle IF	1–1 2–1 (a.e.t.)	IK Stjärnan

?, Gävle
10 September 1905

Gefle IF	3–0	IK Stjärnan

?, Gävle

27 August 1905

Söderhamns IF	v	Strands IF (w.o.)

?, Söderhamn

27 August 1905

AIK	4–2	Södermalms IK

?, Stockholm

27 August 1905

IFK Stockholm	2–2	IFK Norrköping

?, Stockholm
10 September 1905

IFK Norrköping	1–2	IFK Stockholm

?, Norrköping

27 August 1905

IFK Eskilstuna	5–2	IF Svea

?, Eskilstuna

27 August 1905

IFK Köping	9–1	IFK Örebro

?, Köping

== Quarter-finals ==
10 September 1905

Örgryte IS	9–0	Väsby FK

?, Gothenburg

10 September 1905

IFK Köping	1–5	AIK

?, Köping

17 September 1905

Gefle IF	3–1	Söderhamns IF

?, Gävle

24 September 1905

IFK Stockholm	6–0	IFK Eskilstuna

?, Stockholm

== Semi-finals ==
15 September 1905

Örgryte IS	v	Gefle IF (w.o.)

?, Gothenburg

15 September 1905

IFK Stockholm	4–4 4–4 (a.e.t.)	AIK

?, Stockholm
22 October 1905

IFK Stockholm	3–0	AIK

?, Stockholm

== Final ==
29 October 1905

IFK Stockholm	1–2	Örgryte IS
Moberg 1–2		Bergström 0–1; Lund 0–2

Idrottsparken, Stockholm
Attendance: 4,000
Referee: Herman Juhlin, Stockholm
