= 1899 Svenska Mästerskapet =

Tournament details
- Country: Sweden
- Teams: 2

Final positions
- Champions: Örgryte IS
- Runners-up: Göteborgs FF

The 1899 Svenska Mästerskapet was the 4th season of Svenska Mästerskapet, the football Cup to determine the Swedish champions. Örgryte IS won the tournament by defeating Göteborgs FF in the final with a 4–0 score.

== Final ==
6 August 1899

Örgryte IS	4–0	Göteborgs FF

Idrottsplatsen, Gothenburg
Referee: Sven Lindhé, Gothenburg
