= 1897 Svenska Mästerskapet =

Tournament details
- Country: Sweden
- Teams: 2

Final positions
- Champions: Örgryte IS
- Runners-up: Örgryte IS II

The 1897 Svenska Mästerskapet was the second season of Svenska Mästerskapet, the football Cup to determine the Swedish champions. Örgryte IS won the tournament by defeating its reserve team Örgryte IS II in the final with a 1–0 score.

== Final ==
5 September 1897

Örgryte IS	1–0	Örgryte IS II

Idrottsplatsen, Gothenburg
Referee: Wilhelm Friberg, Gothenburg
