= 1904 Svenska Mästerskapet =

Tournament details
- Country: Sweden
- Teams: 22

Final positions
- Champions: Örgryte IS
- Runners-up: Djurgårdens IF

The 1904 Svenska Mästerskapet was the ninth season of Svenska Mästerskapet, the football Cup to determine the Swedish champions. Örgryte IS won the tournament by defeating Djurgårdens IF in the final with a 2–1 score.

== Qualifying round ==
24 July 1904

| Djurgårdens IF | 4–0 | IF Drott (Stockholm) |

?, Stockholm

24 July 1904

| AIK | 6–2 | IK Göta |

?, Stockholm

24 July 1904

| Stockholms IK | 3–2 | Westermalms IF |

?, Stockholm

28 July 1904

| Norrmalms SK | 3–0 | IF Sleipner |

?, Stockholm

3 August 1904

| GUIF | 3–2 | Verdandi VoIF |

?, Eskilstuna

14 August 1904

| IFK Stockholm | 2–5 | IFK Uppsala |

?, Stockholm

== First round ==
4 August 1904

| Östermalms IF | 3–0 | Mariebergs IK |

?, Stockholm

7 August 1904

| IF Swithiod | 4–1 | Södermalms IK |

?, Stockholm

10 August 1904

| Örgryte IS | 4–1 | Göteborgs IF |

?, Gothenburg

14 August 1904

| IFK Norrköping | 2–1 | IFK Eskilstuna |

?, Norrköping

28 August 1904

| AIK | 3–1 | Stockholms IK |

?, Stockholm

28 August 1904

| GUIF | 1–0 | IF Nord |

?, Eskilstuna

28 August 1904

| Djurgårdens IF | 2–0 | Norrmalms SK |

?, Stockholm

28 August 1904

| Gefle IF | 1–0 | IFK Uppsala |

?, Gävle

== Quarter-finals ==
15 August 1904

| Östermalms IF | 2–1 | IF Swithiod |

?, Stockholm

11 September 1904

| GUIF | 1–2 | AIK |

?, Eskilstuna

11 September 1904

| Gefle IF | 0–1 | Djurgårdens IF |

?, Gävle

18 September 1904

| Örgryte IS | 5–0 | IFK Norrköping |

?, Gothenburg

== Semi-finals ==
25 September 1904

| Djurgårdens IF | 3–2 | AIK |

?, Stockholm

25 September 1904

| Östermalms IF | 2–3 | Örgryte IS |

?, Stockholm

== Final ==
16 October 1904

| Djurgårdens IF | 1–2 | Örgryte IS |
|---|---|---|
| Lavass 27' | | Bergström 10'; Unknown 25' |

Idrottsparken, Stockholm
Attendance: 3,000
Referee: Herman Juhlin, Stockholm
