= 1902 in Swedish football =

The 1902 season in Swedish football, starting January 1902 and ending December 1902:

== Honours ==
=== Official titles ===
Title	Team	Reason
Swedish Champions 1902	Örgryte IS	Winners of Svenska Mästerskapet

=== Competitions ===
Level	Competition	Team
Regional league	Svenska Bollspelsförbundets serie 1902	Djurgårdens IF
Regional league	Svenska Bollspelsförbundets andra serie 1902	Östermalms IF
Championship Cup	Svenska Mästerskapet 1902	Örgryte IS
Cup competition	Kamratmästerskapen 1902	IFK Eskilstuna
Cup competition	Rosenska Pokalen 1902	Gefle IF

== Promotions, relegations and qualifications ==
=== Promotions ===
Promoted from	Promoted to	Team	Reason
Svenska Bollspelsförbundets andra serie 1902	Svenska Bollspelsförbundets serie kl. 1 1903	Djurgårdens IF 2	Unknown
Svenska Bollspelsförbundets andra serie 1902	Svenska Bollspelsförbundets serie kl. 1 1903	Östermalms IF	Unknown
Unknown	Svenska Bollspelsförbundets serie kl. 1 1903	IFK Uppsala	Unknown
Unknown	Svenska Bollspelsförbundets serie kl. 2 1903	IK Göta	Unknown
Unknown	Svenska Bollspelsförbundets serie kl. 2 1903	Idrottsklubben	Unknown
Unknown	Svenska Bollspelsförbundets serie kl. 2 1903	Mariebergs IK	Unknown
Unknown	Svenska Bollspelsförbundets serie kl. 2 1903	IFK Stockholm 2	Unknown
Unknown	Svenska Bollspelsförbundets serie kl. 2 1903	Stockholms IK	Unknown

=== Relegations ===
Relegated from	Relegated to	Team	Reason
Svenska Bollspelsförbundets serie 1902	Svenska Bollspelsförbundets serie kl. 2 1903	AIK 2	Unknown
Svenska Bollspelsförbundets serie 1902	Svenska Bollspelsförbundets serie kl. 2 1903	Östermalms SK	Unknown
Svenska Bollspelsförbundets serie 1902	Unknown	Norrmalms IK	Unknown
Svenska Bollspelsförbundets andra serie 1902	Unknown	AIK 3	Unknown
Svenska Bollspelsförbundets andra serie 1902	Unknown	IFK Stockholm	Unknown
Svenska Bollspelsförbundets andra serie 1902	Unknown	IF Swithiod 2	Unknown

== Domestic results ==
=== Svenska Bollspelsförbundets serie 1902 ===
	Team	Pld	W	D	L	GF		GA	GD	Pts
1	Djurgårdens IF	6	6	0	0	36	–	1	+35	12
2	IF Swithiod	6	5	0	1	27	–	8	+19	10
3	IF Sleipner	6	3	1	2	10	–	14	-4	7
4	AIK	6	3	0	3	17	–	11	+6	6
5	Östermalms SK	6	2	0	4	12	–	16	-4	4
6	Norrmalms IK	6	0	2	4	4	–	27	-23	2
7	AIK 2	6	0	1	5	2	–	31	-29	1

=== Svenska Bollspelsförbundets andra serie 1902 ===
	Team	Pld	W	D	L	GF		GA	GD	Pts
1	Östermalms IF	6	5	1	0	15	–	3	+12	11
2	Djurgårdens IF 2	6	3	3	0	15	–	3	+12	9
3	IFK Stockholm	6	3	2	1	7	–	6	+1	8
4	Norrmalms SK	6	3	1	2	6	–	5	+1	7
5	IK Svea	6	2	0	4	4	–	10	-6	4
6	AIK 3	6	1	1	4	0	–	16	-16	3
7	IF Swithiod 2	6	0	0	6	0	–	4	-4	0

=== Svenska Mästerskapet 1902 ===
Final

August 30, 1902

Örgryte IS	8–0	Jönköpings AIF

Vallområdets fotbollsplan, Jönköping

=== Kamratmästerskapen 1902 ===
Final

October 12, 1902

IFK Eskilstuna	1–1 1–1 (aet)	IFK Uppsala

Idrottsparken, Stockholm
November 2, 1902

IFK Eskilstuna	1–0	IFK Uppsala

Idrottsparken, Stockholm

=== Rosenska Pokalen 1902 ===
Final

September 7, 1902

Gefle IF	1–0	Djurgårdens IF

Idrottsparken, Stockholm
