= 1908 Svenska Mästerskapet =

Tournament details
- Country: Sweden
- Teams: 18

Final positions
- Champions: IFK Göteborg
- Runners-up: IFK Uppsala

The 1908 Svenska Mästerskapet was the thirteenth season of Svenska Mästerskapet, the football Cup to determine the Swedish champions. IFK Göteborg won the tournament by defeating IFK Uppsala in the final with a 4–3 score.

== Qualifying round ==
16 August 1908

IF Svea	v	IFK Arboga (w.o.)

?, Eskilstuna

16 August 1908

Malmö BoIS	3–0	Väsby FK

?, Malmö

== First round ==
23 August 1908

IFK Stockholm	5–2	IF Svea

?, Stockholm

23 August 1908

IFK Köping	0–1	Djurgårdens IF

?, Köping

23 August 1908

Sandvikens AIK	2–3	IFK Uppsala

?, Sandviken

23 August 1908

Strands IF	3–3 3–5 (a.e.t.)	IFK Gävle

?, Hudiksvall

23 August 1908

Karlskrona AIF	0–9	Malmö BoIS

?, Karlskrona

23 August 1908

IFK Eskilstuna	2–5	IFK Göteborg

?, Eskilstuna

23 August 1908

IK Sleipner	4–0	IFK Kalmar

?, Norrköping

23 August 1908

Örgryte IS	1–3	AIK

?, Gothenburg
13 September 1908

AIK	3–2	Örgryte IS

?, Eskilstuna

== Quarter-finals ==
13 September 1908

IFK Gävle	1–7	IFK Stockholm

?, Gävle

13 September 1908

IFK Uppsala	4–1	Djurgårdens IF

?, Uppsala

13 September 1908

Malmö BoIS	3–3 3–3 (a.e.t.)	IFK Göteborg

?, Malmö
20 September 1908

IFK Göteborg	5–2	Malmö BoIS

?, Gothenburg

27 September 1908

IK Sleipner	1–0	AIK

?, Norrköping

== Semi-finals ==
4 October 1908

IFK Stockholm	2–2 2–3 (a.e.t.)	IFK Uppsala

?, Stockholm

4 October 1908

IFK Göteborg	10–0	IK Sleipner

?, Gothenburg

== Final ==
11 October 1908

IFK Göteborg	4–3	IFK Uppsala
Fagrell 16'; Börjesson 17' (pen.); Lund 35'; Andén 85' (o.g.)		Lindman 0–1; Olsson 20'; Ekbom 44'

Walhalla IP, Gothenburg
Attendance: 4,500
Referee: Ruben Gelbord, Stockholm
