= 1907 Svenska Mästerskapet =

Tournament details
- Country: Sweden
- Teams: 16

Final positions
- Champions: Örgryte IS
- Runners-up: IFK Uppsala

The 1907 Svenska Mästerskapet was the twelfth season of Svenska Mästerskapet, the football Cup to determine the Swedish champions. Örgryte IS won the tournament by defeating IFK Uppsala in the final with a 4–1 score.

== First round ==
25 August 1907

Verdandi VoIF	3–3	IFK Köping

?, Eskilstuna
1 September 1907

IFK Köping	2–1	Verdandi VoIF

?, Köping

25 August 1907

Gefle IF	8–1	Söderhamns IF

?, Gävle

25 August 1907

IFK Kalmar	0–1	Väsby FK

?, Kalmar

25 August 1907

IFK Norrköping	0–5	IFK Stockholm

?, Norrköping

25 August 1907

Sandvikens AIK	1–2	IFK Uppsala

?, Sandviken

25 August 1907

AIK	1–5	IFK Eskilstuna

?, Stockholm

25 August 1907

Djurgårdens IF	9–1	IFK Västerås

?, Stockholm

30 August 1907

IFK Göteborg	0–8	Örgryte IS

?, Gothenburg

== Quarter-finals ==
8 September 1907

IFK Eskilstuna	5–0	Djurgårdens IF

?, Eskilstuna

8 September 1907

Gefle IF	3–5	IFK Uppsala

?, Gävle

8 September 1907

Örgryte IS	16–0	Väsby FK

?, Gothenburg

8 September 1907

IFK Köping	2–2	IFK Stockholm

?, Köping
15 September 1907

IFK Stockholm	5–0	IFK Köping

?, Stockholm

== Semi-finals ==
22 September 1907

IFK Uppsala	9–0	IFK Eskilstuna

?, Uppsala

29 September 1907

Örgryte IS	7–3	IFK Stockholm

?, Eskilstuna

== Final ==
6 October 1907

Örgryte IS	4–1	IFK Uppsala
E. Bergström 38'; Larsson 62', 2–1; G. Bergström 3–1; Larsson 4–1		Lindman 21'

Idrottsparken, Stockholm
Attendance: 7,000
Referee: Ruben Gelbord, Stockholm
