= 1898 Svenska Mästerskapet =

Tournament details
- Country: Sweden
- Teams: 2

Final positions
- Champions: Örgryte IS
- Runners-up: AIK

The 1898 Svenska Mästerskapet was the third season of Svenska Mästerskapet, the football Cup to determine the Swedish champions. Örgryte won the tournament by defeating AIK in the final with a 3–0 score.

== Final ==
30 July 1898

| AIK | 0–3 | Örgryte IS |

Gärdet, Stockholm
Attendance: 200
Referee: Wilhelm Friberg, Gothenburg
