= 1915 Svenska Mästerskapet =

Tournament details
- Country: Sweden

Final positions
- Champions: Djurgårdens IF
- Runners-up: Örgryte IS

The 1915 Svenska Mästerskapet was the 20th season of Svenska Mästerskapet, the football cup to determine the Swedish champions. Djurgårdens IF won the tournament by defeating Örgryte IS in the final with a 4–1 score.

== Qualifying rounds ==
=== First qualifying round ===
Team 1	Score	Team 2
Djurgårdens IF	5–0	IF Swithiod
Westermalms IF	2–1	Klara SK
IK City	4–1	IF Verdandi
IK Sirius	3–1 (a.e.t.)	Johanneshovs IF
IK Sleipner	1–3	IFK Stockholm

=== Second qualifying round ===
Team 1	Score	Team 2
IFK Gävle	0–2	Gefle IF
Westermalms IF	4–3	Köpings IS
Djurgårdens IF	2–0	IK Sirius
IFK Eskilstuna	5–0	IK City
GAIS	10–0	IK Wega
IFK Norrköping	1–3	IK Sleipner
IFK Göteborg	—	Jönköpings IS (w.o.)
IS Halmia	—	IFK Malmö (w.o.)

== Main tournament ==
=== Preliminary round ===
Team 1	Score	Team 2
AIK	3–1	Mariebergs IK
Djurgårdens IF	7–0	IFK Stockholm
IFK Göteborg	2–3	GAIS
IK Sleipner	0–1	Hälsingborgs IF
IFK Eskilstuna	1–1	IFK Västerås
Gefle IF	0–3	Sandvikens AIK
IFK Uppsala	0–1	Westermalms IF
IS Halmia	1–3	Örgryte IS
Replays
IFK Västerås	1–1	IFK Eskilstuna
IFK Eskilstuna	4–2	IFK Västerås

=== Quarter-finals ===
Team 1	Score	Team 2
AIK	4–0	Sandvikens AIK
Djurgårdens IF	0–0	Hälsingborgs IF
IFK Eskilstuna	2–2	GAIS
Örgryte IS	5–1	Westermalms IF
Replays
Hälsingborgs IF	2–2	Djurgårdens IF
Djurgårdens IF	2–1	Hälsingborgs IF
GAIS	3–2	IFK Eskilstuna

=== Semi-finals ===
Team 1	Score	Team 2
Djurgårdens IF	2–1	AIK
Örgryte IS	4–0	IFK Eskilstuna

=== Final ===
17 October 1915

Djurgårdens IF	4–1	Örgryte IS
Karlstrand 7'; G. Johansson 25'; Nordenskjöld; Söderberg 75'		Kristiansson 24'

Stockholm Olympic Stadium, Stockholm
Attendance: 10,000
Referee: Ruben Gelbord, Stockholm
