= 1917 Svenska Mästerskapet =

Tournament details
- Country: Sweden

Final positions
- Champions: Djurgårdens IF
- Runners-up: AIK

Tournament statistics
- Matches played: 35
- Goals scored: 115 (3.29 per match)

The 1917 Svenska Mästerskapet was the 22nd season of Svenska Mästerskapet, the football cup to determine the Swedish champions. Djurgårdens IF won the tournament by defeating AIK in the final with a 3–1 score.

== Qualifying rounds ==
=== First qualifying round ===
Team 1	Score	Team 2
Järva IS	2–1	IFK Stockholm
IFK Uppsala	3–1	IF Vesta
Johanneshovs IF	2–3	Mariebergs IK
IS Halmia	1–4	GAIS
IF Verdandi	3–2	IFK Västerås
Köpings IS	1–0	IK City
IF Elfsborg	2–1	IFK Uddevalla

=== Second qualifying round ===
Team 1	Score	Team 2
IK Sirius	2–0	IFK Uppsala
Hammarby IF	2–2	Westermalms IF
Gefle IF	—	IFK Gävle (w.o.)
IFK Malmö	4–1	Malmö FF
IF Elfsborg	0–0	GAIS
Mariebergs IK	4–1	Järva IS
Köpings IS	0–1	IF Verdandi
IK Sleipner	—	IF Gothia (w.o.)
Replays
Hammarby IF	3–1	Westermalms IF

== Main tournament ==
=== Preliminary round ===
Team 1	Score	Team 2
AIK	5–1	Örgryte IS
IFK Eskilstuna	1–0	IF Verdandi
IFK Göteborg	2–0	GAIS
IFK Norrköping	2–1	IK Sleipner
Gefle IF	3–4	Sandvikens AIK
Hammarby IF	1–1	IK Sirius
Djurgårdens IF	3–2	Mariebergs IK
IFK Malmö	0–5	Hälsingborgs IF
Replays
IK Sirius	3–0	Hammarby IF

=== Quarter-finals ===
Team 1	Score	Team 2
AIK	2–0	IFK Eskilstuna
Sandvikens AIK	1–6	Djurgårdens IF
Hälsingborgs IF	1–1	IFK Göteborg
IFK Norrköping	3–3	IK Sirius
Replays
IFK Göteborg	6–0	Hälsingborgs IF
IK Sirius	3–0	IFK Norrköping

=== Semi-finals ===
Team 1	Score	Team 2
IK Sirius	0–1	AIK
Djurgårdens IF	0–0	IFK Göteborg
Replays
IFK Göteborg	1–2	Djurgårdens IF

=== Final ===
11 November 1917

Djurgårdens IF	3–1	AIK
Englund 45'; G. Johansson 78'; Olsson 85'		Svedberg 25'

Stockholm Olympic Stadium, Stockholm
Attendance: 7,256
Referee: Erik Alstam, Gothenburg
