= Jacob Lackéll =

Swedish footballer

Personal information
- Date of birth: 5 July 2001 (age 25)
- Place of birth: Sweden
- Position: Midfielder

Team information
- Current team: IFK Eskilstuna
- Number: 22

Youth career
- IFK Eskilstuna
- 2017–2018: AFC Eskilstuna
- 2020: Örebro SK

Senior career*
| Years | Team | Apps | (Gls) |
| 2017–2018 | Eskilstuna City | 23 | (0) |
| 2019–2020 | AFC Eskilstuna | 4 | (0) |
| 2019 | → IFK Eskilstuna (loan) | 5 | (0) |
| 2021– | IFK Eskilstuna | 25 | (0) |
- * Club domestic league appearances and goals as of 13:39, 14 November 2021 (UTC)

Jacob Lackéll (born 5 July 2001) is a Swedish footballer who plays for IFK Eskilstuna.
