= 1896 Svenska Mästerskapet =

Tournament details
- Country: Sweden
- Teams: 2

Final positions
- Champions: Örgryte IS
- Runners-up: IS Idrottens Vänner

The 1896 Svenska Mästerskapet was the first season of Svenska Mästerskapet, the football Cup to determine the Swedish champions. Örgryte IS won the tournament by defeating IS Idrottens Vänner in the final with a 3–0 score.

== Final ==
8 August 1896

Örgryte IS	3–0	IS Idrottens Vänner

Skånska Husarregementets fotbollsplan, Helsingborg
