= 1906 Svenska Mästerskapet =

Tournament details
- Country: Sweden
- Teams: 8

Final positions
- Champions: Örgryte IS
- Runners-up: Djurgårdens IF

The 1906 Svenska Mästerskapet was the eleventh season of Svenska Mästerskapet, the football Cup to determine the Swedish champions. Örgryte IS won the tournament by defeating Djurgårdens IF in the final with a 4–3 score.

== Quarter-finals ==
9 September 1906

Örgryte IS	v	Malmö BK (w.o.)

?, Gothenburg

9 September 1906

IFK Köping	0–6	IFK Eskilstuna

?, Köping

9 September 1906

Djurgårdens IF	8–0	IFK Norrköping

?, Stockholm

9 September 1906

Söderhamns IF	1–3	Gefle IF

?, Söderhamn

== Semi-finals ==
23 September 1906

Örgryte IS	3–1	IFK Eskilstuna

?, Gothenburg

23 September 1906

Djurgårdens IF	3–2	Gefle IF

?, Stockholm

== Final ==
7 October 1906

Djurgårdens IF	3–4	Örgryte IS
Rosén 1–1, 3–1; Clausen 2–1		E. Bergström 14'; Unknown 3–2; Unknown 76'; G. Bergström 90'

Idrottsparken, Stockholm
Attendance: 3,800
Referee: Herman Juhlin, Stockholm
