= 1971 Division 2 (Swedish football) =

Swedish League Division 2
- Season: 1971
- Champions: Sandvikens IF; IF Saab; GAIS; Halmstads BK
- Promoted: GAIS; Halmstads BK
- Relegated: Ljusdals IF; Sandåkerns SK; Lycksele IF; Bodens BK; Timrå IK; IK Brage; Södertälje SK; IFK Stockholm; IF Vesta; Råsunda IS; Grimsås IF; Västra Frölunda IF; Degerfors IF; Hovås IF; Karlstads BK; Varbergs BoIS; Gnosjö IF; Helsingborgs IF; Nybro IF; Gunnarstorps IF

Statistics of the Swedish football Division 2 in the 1971 season.

== League standings ==
=== Norrland ===
Pos	Team	Pld	W	D	L	GF	GA	GD	Pts	Qualification or relegation
1	Sandvikens IF	22	16	4	2	65	16	+49	36	Playoffs for promotion to Allsvenskan
2	IFK Holmsund	22	14	2	6	52	29	+23	30	
3	Domsjö IF	22	13	2	7	41	21	+20	28	
4	Brynäs IF	22	8	9	5	43	30	+13	25	
5	GIF Sundsvall	22	11	3	8	45	35	+10	25	
6	Kubikenborgs IF	22	11	3	8	33	28	+5	25	
7	Skellefteå AIK	22	9	7	6	38	35	+3	25	
8	Ljusdals IF	22	10	4	8	30	28	+2	24	Relegation to Division 3
9	Sandåkerns SK	22	9	3	10	30	34	−4	21	Relegation to Division 3
10	Lycksele IF	22	2	7	13	14	45	−31	11	Relegation to Division 3
11	Bodens BK	22	2	3	17	19	65	−46	7	Relegation to Division 3
12	Timrå IK	22	3	0	19	22	64	−42	6	Relegation to Division 3

=== Svealand ===
Pos	Team	Pld	W	D	L	GF	GA	GD	Pts	Qualification or relegation
1	IF Saab	22	14	4	4	44	16	+28	32	Playoffs for promotion to Allsvenskan
2	IK Sirius	22	14	3	5	45	21	+24	31	
3	IK Sleipner	22	11	6	5	42	24	+18	28	
4	Nyköpings BIS	22	12	3	7	33	27	+6	27	
5	Älvsjö AIK	22	11	2	9	32	31	+1	24	
6	IFK Eskilstuna	22	9	5	8	36	31	+5	23	
7	IF Brommapojkarna	22	9	5	8	38	36	+2	23	
8	IK Brage	22	8	4	10	37	41	−4	20	Relegation to Division 3
9	Södertälje SK	22	7	5	10	43	43	0	19	Relegation to Division 3
10	IFK Stockholm	22	6	5	11	33	40	−7	17	Relegation to Division 3
11	IF Vesta	22	3	7	12	22	41	−19	13	Relegation to Division 3
12	Råsunda IS	22	2	3	17	12	66	−54	7	Relegation to Division 3

=== Norra Götaland ===
Pos	Team	Pld	W	D	L	GF	GA	GD	Pts	Qualification or relegation
1	GAIS	22	19	0	3	72	28	+44	38	Playoffs for promotion to Allsvenskan
2	Jönköpings Södra IF	22	13	2	7	55	39	+16	28	
3	IFK Göteborg	22	12	2	8	42	30	+12	26	
4	Skövde AIK	22	12	2	8	44	38	+6	26	
5	IFK Arvika	22	8	6	8	27	33	−6	22	
6	KB Karlskoga	22	8	5	9	36	37	−1	21	
7	Skogens IF	22	9	3	10	32	35	−3	21	
8	Grimsås IF	22	7	7	8	23	29	−6	21	Relegation to Division 3
9	Västra Frölunda IF	22	9	2	11	32	38	−6	20	Relegation to Division 3
10	Degerfors IF	22	6	6	10	29	37	−8	18	Relegation to Division 3
11	Hovås IF	22	3	6	13	28	49	−21	12	Relegation to Division 3
12	Karlstads BK	22	4	3	15	19	46	−27	11	Relegation to Division 3

=== Södra Götaland ===
Pos	Team	Pld	W	D	L	GF	GA	GD	Pts	Qualification or relegation
1	Halmstads BK	22	14	5	3	41	20	+21	33	Playoffs for promotion to Allsvenskan
2	Perstorps SK	22	10	7	5	60	27	+33	27	
3	IFK Malmö	22	10	7	5	28	21	+7	27	
4	IS Halmia	22	9	7	6	40	29	+11	25	
5	IFK Trelleborg	22	11	2	9	34	31	+3	24	
6	Kalmar FF	22	8	7	7	30	32	−2	23	
7	Blomstermåla IK	22	8	6	8	32	38	−6	22	
8	Varbergs BoIS	22	6	7	9	29	37	−8	19	Relegation to Division 3
9	Gnosjö IF	22	7	4	11	28	42	−14	18	Relegation to Division 3
10	Helsingborgs IF	22	6	6	10	29	44	−15	18	Relegation to Division 3
11	Nybro IF	22	5	5	12	33	42	−9	15	Relegation to Division 3
12	Gunnarstorps IF	22	4	5	13	28	49	−21	13	Relegation to Division 3

== Allsvenskan promotion playoffs ==
Pos	Team	Pld	W	D	L	GF	GA	GD	Pts	Promotion
1	GAIS	3	2	1	0	5	2	+3	5	Promotion to Allsvenskan
2	Halmstads BK	3	1	1	1	5	5	0	3	Promotion to Allsvenskan
3	Sandvikens IF	3	1	0	2	2	2	0	2	
4	IF Saab	3	1	0	2	5	8	−3	2	
