= 1900 Svenska Mästerskapet =

Tournament details
- Country: Sweden
- Teams: 2

Final positions
- Champions: AIK
- Runners-up: Örgryte IS

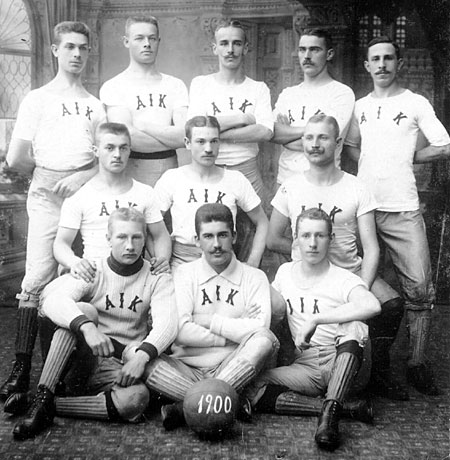
The AIK winning team: Back row from left: Gunnar Juhlin, Herman Juhlin, Gunnar Franzén, Oscar Norgren, and B. Bergquist (reserve for Knut Norgren) Middle row: Hugo Berg, Fritz Carlsson, and Gunnar Stenberg. Front row: David Jahrl, Edvin Sandborg, and Karl G. Andersson

The 1900 Svenska Mästerskapet was the fifth season of Svenska Mästerskapet, the football Cup to determine the Swedish champions. AIK won the tournament by defeating Örgryte IS in the final with a 1–0 score.

== Final ==
29 July 1900

| AIK | 1–0 | Örgryte IS |
|---|---|---|
| Franzén 51' |

Lindarängen, Stockholm
Attendance: 200
Referee: Wilhelm Lilliesköld, Stockholm
