= 1973 Division 2 (Swedish football) =

Swedish League Division 2
- Season: 1973
- Champions: Brynäs IF; Halmstads BK
- Promoted: Brynäs IF; Halmstads BK
- Relegated: IK Brage; IFK Luleå; IFK Holmsund; IFK Trelleborg; Blomstermåla IK; Jönköpings Södra IF

Statistics of Swedish football Division 2 for the 1973 season.

== League standings ==
=== Norra ===
Pos	Team	Pld	W	D	L	GF	GA	GD	Pts	Promotion or relegation
1	Brynäs IF	26	17	4	5	46	24	+22	38	Promotion to Allsvenskan
2	GIF Sundsvall	26	16	5	5	63	25	+38	37	
3	IFK Sundsvall	25	13	7	5	41	29	+12	33 (Note: The match between IFK Luleå and IFK Sundsvall was not played because of bad weather.)	
4	Sandvikens IF	26	11	9	6	44	35	+9	31	
5	Nyköpings BIS	26	11	8	7	42	34	+8	30	
6	KB Karlskoga	26	11	7	8	61	49	+12	29	
7	Degerfors IF	26	12	5	9	40	38	+2	29	
8	IFK Eskilstuna	26	12	4	10	62	43	+19	28	
9	Älvsjö AIK	26	10	5	11	36	33	+3	25	
10	Ope IF	26	9	5	12	39	47	−8	23	
11	IF Brommapojkarna	26	8	7	11	39	52	−13	23	
12	IK Brage	26	6	2	18	30	59	−29	14	Relegation to Division 3
13	IFK Luleå	25	3	6	16	34	59	−25	12	Relegation to Division 3
14	IFK Holmsund	26	5	0	21	23	73	−50	10	Relegation to Division 3

=== Södra ===
Pos	Team	Pld	W	D	L	GF	GA	GD	Pts	Promotion or relegation
1	Halmstads BK	26	14	10	2	46	28	+18	38	Promotion to Allsvenskan
2	Skövde AIK	26	12	9	5	53	36	+17	33	
3	Kalmar FF	26	13	6	7	52	28	+24	32	
4	IFK Göteborg	26	13	5	8	40	32	+8	31	
5	Hässleholms IF	26	13	4	9	44	35	+9	30	
6	IFK Kristianstad	26	8	10	8	38	35	+3	26	
7	IS Halmia	26	9	8	9	33	37	−4	26	
8	IFK Malmö	26	7	11	8	32	35	−3	25	
9	Grimsås IF	26	8	7	11	38	43	−5	23	
10	Västra Frölunda IF	26	5	13	8	18	23	−5	23	
11	IK Sleipner	26	7	9	10	30	38	−8	23	
12	IFK Trelleborg	26	7	6	13	29	49	−20	20	Relegation to Division 3
13	Blomstermåla IK	26	5	9	12	34	44	−10	19	Relegation to Division 3
14	Jönköpings Södra IF	26	6	3	17	37	61	−24	15	Relegation to Division 3
