= 1968 Allsvenskan =

44th season of Allsvenskan

Allsvenskan
- Season: 1968
- Champions: Östers IF
- Relegated: Hälsingborgs IF; Örgryte IS
- European Cup: Östers IF
- Top goalscorer: Ove Eklund, Åtvidabergs FF (17)
- Average attendance: 10,159

Statistics of Allsvenskan in season 1968.

== Overview ==
The league was contested by 12 teams, with Östers IF winning the championship.

== League table ==
Pos	Team	Pld	W	D	L	GF	GA	GD	Pts	Qualification or relegation
1	Östers IF (C)	22	12	3	7	44	28	+16	27	Qualification to European Cup first round
2	Malmö FF	22	11	5	6	42	27	+15	27	
3	IFK Norrköping	22	11	5	6	36	24	+12	27	Qualification to Cup Winners' Cup first round (Note: IFK Norrköping qualified for the European Cup Winners' Cup as Svenska Cupen champions 1968–69.)
4	Djurgårdens IF	22	10	7	5	36	29	+7	27	
5	Örebro SK	22	11	3	8	34	35	−1	25	
6	IF Elfsborg	22	8	7	7	33	28	+5	23	
7	Åtvidabergs FF	22	11	0	11	34	29	+5	22	
8	GAIS	22	7	4	11	29	36	−7	18	
9	IFK Göteborg	22	5	8	9	30	42	−12	18	
10	AIK	22	5	7	10	28	36	−8	17	
11	Hälsingborgs IF (R)	22	7	3	12	23	38	−15	17	Relegation to Division 2
12	Örgryte IS (R)	22	4	8	10	28	45	−17	16	Relegation to Division 2

Rules for classification: 1) points; 2) goal difference; 3) number of goals scored.
(C) Champions; (R) Relegated

== Results ==
Home \ Away	AIK	DIF	GAIS	HIF	IFE	IFKG	IFKN	MFF	ÅFF	ÖSK	ÖIS	ÖIF
AIK		0–4	2–0	0–4	0–0	9–3	1–1	0–1	2–0	1–3	3–3	1–0
Djurgårdens IF	2–0		4–1	0–0	1–1	1–1	2–1	2–2	2–1	1–3	0–3	2–1
GAIS	2–0	3–1		1–3	3–0	3–0	0–2	0–2	1–0	4–1	1–1	1–3
Hälsingborgs IF	1–0	0–2	2–2		0–2	0–3	1–3	2–0	1–3	0–1	1–0	1–3
IF Elfsborg	1–1	4–0	3–1	1–1		2–1	1–2	1–2	1–3	3–1	4–2	0–3
IFK Göteborg	2–1	1–1	0–0	1–2	3–2		1–1	2–3	1–0	1–3	1–1	2–3
IFK Norrköping	2–2	2–2	1–0	3–0	1–1	0–1		4–1	1–0	0–2	1–0	2–0
Malmö FF	3–1	1–1	1–2	2–0	0–0	1–1	4–1		1–0	1–1	5–1	4–0
Åtvidabergs FF	2–1	0–2	3–0	6–1	2–1	2–1	3–1	2–1		4–0	0–2	0–3
Örebro SK	1–2	1–0	2–1	2–1	0–3	1–1	0–2	2–1	0–1		1–3	2–1
Örgryte IS	1–1	2–4	2–2	0–2	0–0	2–2	0–4	0–5	3–1	1–4		1–1
Östers IF	0–0	1–2	3–1	3–0	1–2	4–1	2–1	4–1	3–1	3–3	2–0	

Legend: Blue = home team win; Yellow = draw; Red = away team win.

== Attendances ==
#	Club	Average attendance	Highest attendance
1	Östers IF	15,492	22,113
2	Malmö FF	13,912	18,647
3	IFK Göteborg	12,221	21,530
4	IFK Norrköping	11,399	22,128
5	GAIS	11,267	17,104
6	Djurgårdens IF	11,241	35,921
7	AIK	10,771	28,051
8	IF Elfsborg	9,872	16,616
9	Örgryte IS	9,807	21,482
10	Hälsingborgs IF	9,061	16,145
11	Örebro SK	7,069	11,389
12	Åtvidabergs FF	5,694	11,049
