= 1932–33 Allsvenskan =

9th season of Allsvenskan

Allsvenskan
- Season: 1932–33
- Champions: Hälsingborgs IF
- Relegated: IK Sleipner; Landskrona BoIS
- Top goalscorer: Torsten Bunke, Hälsingborgs IF (21)
- Average attendance: 7,172

Statistics of Allsvenskan in season 1932/1933.

== Overview ==
The league was contested by 12 teams, with Hälsingborgs IF winning the championship.

== League table ==
Pos	Team	Pld	W	D	L	GF	GA	GD	Pts	Qualification or relegation
1	Hälsingborgs IF (C)	22	16	3	3	68	38	+30	35	
2	GAIS	22	16	2	4	70	30	+40	34	
3	IFK Göteborg	22	11	3	8	58	42	+16	25	
4	AIK	22	11	2	9	60	40	+20	24	
5	Örgryte IS	22	9	2	11	40	43	−3	20	
6	IFK Eskilstuna	22	9	2	11	47	55	−8	20	
7	Sandvikens IF	22	7	5	10	43	48	−5	19	
8	IF Elfsborg	22	8	3	11	44	54	−10	19	
9	Malmö FF	22	8	3	11	42	66	−24	19	
10	IS Halmia	22	7	3	12	34	50	−16	17	
11	IK Sleipner (R)	22	7	3	12	34	52	−18	17	Relegation to Division 2
12	Landskrona BoIS (R)	22	6	3	13	38	60	−22	15	Relegation to Division 2

Rules for classification: 1) points; 2) goal difference; 3) number of goals scored.
(C) Champions; (R) Relegated

== Results ==
Home \ Away	AIK	GAIS	HIF	IFE	IFKE	IFKG	IKS	ISH	BOIS	MFF	SIF	ÖIS
AIK		0–0	2–4	4–0	2–3	6–1	6–1	2–3	6–1	1–1	6–2	2–0
GAIS	3–2		9–2	5–3	5–1	2–2	3–1	2–0	5–0	4–2	1–3	0–2
Hälsingborgs IF	2–1	2–1		6–0	1–2	5–3	4–2	6–1	3–0	6–1	3–1	2–2
IF Elfsborg	0–1	0–3	2–4		3–1	3–2	3–0	4–0	2–5	7–1	2–0	2–1
IFK Eskilstuna	5–3	0–1	3–3	3–0		3–1	1–2	2–6	0–3	3–2	3–3	2–3
IFK Göteborg	3–0	3–1	2–2	2–1	4–0		5–0	1–0	5–1	7–2	1–0	3–6
IK Sleipner	2–3	2–6	0–2	1–1	2–0	2–1		1–0	2–3	1–1	4–5	2–0
IS Halmia	3–7	1–4	1–2	4–1	2–5	1–0	3–0		1–1	1–3	0–2	2–1
Landskrona BoIS	4–2	2–5	0–4	3–3	1–3	2–4	0–3	0–1		2–0	3–1	1–2
Malmö FF	2–1	0–4	4–2	4–1	1–5	0–5	3–5	2–2	3–2		4–3	2–0
Sandvikens IF	0–2	2–4	1–2	1–1	3–0	2–2	1–1	3–1	2–2	2–0		3–2
Örgryte IS	0–1	0–2	0–1	3–5	4–2	3–1	1–0	1–1	3–2	2–4	4–3	

Legend: Blue = home team win; Yellow = draw; Red = away team win.

== Attendances ==
#	Club	Average	Highest
1	AIK	15,942	20,436
2	GAIS	10,265	21,989
3	IFK Göteborg	9,560	13,554
4	Örgryte IS	9,448	20,675
5	Malmö FF	7,683	9,452
6	Hälsingborgs IF	6,190	12,553
7	IK Sleipner	5,944	8,511
8	IS Halmia	5,269	11,690
9	IFK Eskilstuna	4,919	12,434
10	IF Elfsborg	4,596	8,411
11	Sandvikens IF	3,492	8,551
12	Landskrona BoIS	2,766	6,854
