= 1942–43 Allsvenskan =

19th season of Allsvenskan

Allsvenskan
- Season: 1942–43
- Champions: IFK Norrköping
- Relegated: Gårda BK; IFK Eskilstuna
- Top goalscorer: Gunnar Nordahl, Degerfors IF (16)
- Average attendance: 6,190

Statistics of Allsvenskan in season 1942/1943.

== Overview ==
The league was contested by 12 teams, with IFK Norrköping winning the championship.

== League table ==
Pos	Team	Pld	W	D	L	GF	GA	GD	Pts	Qualification or relegation
1	IFK Norrköping (C)	22	12	7	3	52	25	+27	31	
2	IF Elfsborg	22	14	2	6	58	32	+26	30	
3	Hälsingborgs IF	22	12	6	4	46	28	+18	30	
4	Degerfors IF	22	9	8	5	49	27	+22	26	
5	Malmö FF	22	10	5	7	44	30	+14	25	
6	Halmstads BK	22	9	7	6	38	50	−12	25	
7	AIK	22	10	4	8	48	37	+11	24	
8	IFK Göteborg	22	7	10	5	46	40	+6	24	
9	Sandvikens IF	22	8	2	12	31	47	−16	18	
10	GAIS	22	6	3	13	38	47	−9	15	
11	Gårda (R)	22	2	5	15	17	60	−43	9	Relegation to Division 2
12	IFK Eskilstuna (R)	22	2	3	17	31	75	−44	7	Relegation to Division 2

Rules for classification: 1) points; 2) goal difference; 3) number of goals scored.
(C) Champions; (R) Relegated

== Results ==
Home \ Away	AIK	DIF	GAIS	GBK	HBK	HIF	IFE	IFKE	IFKG	IFKN	MFF	SIF
AIK		1–0	5–3	7–1	6–1	1–0	2–3	5–2	2–2	1–3	1–2	2–1
Degerfors IF	4–1		5–4	2–1	5–0	0–0	1–3	5–0	1–1	2–2	2–1	4–0
GAIS	0–1	0–0		2–0	1–2	0–1	4–3	6–1	0–1	1–3	0–2	2–3
Gårda BK	0–4	0–7	1–3		0–0	1–2	1–3	2–2	0–5	0–2	2–1	1–0
Halmstads BK	0–0	3–0	3–2	1–1		0–4	0–0	4–3	5–2	2–1	0–0	6–0
Hälsingborgs IF	2–0	2–2	4–1	3–1	4–1		2–1	2–2	3–2	1–1	2–2	1–2
IF Elfsborg	5–2	3–2	4–0	5–1	3–1	1–2		3–1	4–1	1–2	6–1	1–0
IFK Eskilstuna	1–1	0–3	1–4	3–1	2–3	5–1	2–4		0–3	0–3	2–6	1–2
IFK Göteborg	1–1	1–1	2–2	1–1	2–2	1–3	2–2	5–1		1–6	1–1	5–3
IFK Norrköping	2–4	2–1	1–1	1–1	1–1	0–0	2–0	6–1	1–4		2–0	3–3
Malmö FF	2–0	1–1	3–0	3–0	12–0	0–4	2–1	4–1	0–0	0–4		0–1
Sandvikens IF	2–1	1–1	1–2	3–1	1–3	4–3	1–2	2–0	1–3	0–4	0–1	

Legend: Blue = home team win; Yellow = draw; Red = away team win.

== Attendances ==
#	Club	Average	Highest
1	AIK	10,058	16,292
2	IFK Göteborg	9,815	16,648
3	Malmö FF	8,186	14,045
4	GAIS	7,762	16,648
5	IFK Norrköping	7,171	16,068
6	Hälsingborgs IF	6,239	9,130
7	IFK Eskilstuna	5,409	6,700
8	Halmstads BK	5,345	7,667
9	IF Elfsborg	5,325	9,308
10	Gårda BK	4,082	7,090
11	Degerfors IF	3,189	5,676
12	Sandvikens IF	2,481	4,497
