= 1956–57 Allsvenskan =

33rd season of Allsvenskan

Allsvenskan
- Season: 1956–57
- Champions: IFK Norrköping
- Relegated: Västerås SK; Hammarby IF
- European Cup: IFK Norrköping
- Top goalscorer: Harry Bild, IFK Norrköping (19)
- Average attendance: 11,404

These are the statistics for the 1956–1957 season of Allsvenskan, the top tier of the Swedish football league system.

== Overview ==
The league was contested by 12 teams, with the defending champion IFK Norrköping winning the championship.

== League table ==
Pos	Team	Pld	W	D	L	GF	GA	GD	Pts	Qualification or relegation
1	IFK Norrköping (C)	22	17	1	4	64	25	+39	35	Qualification to European Cup first round
2	Malmö FF	22	11	6	5	50	30	+20	28	
3	Hälsingborgs IF	22	9	9	4	37	26	+11	27	
4	GAIS	22	10	4	8	46	42	+4	24	
5	Djurgårdens IF	22	9	6	7	35	33	+2	24	
6	AIK	22	9	5	8	39	30	+9	23	
7	Sandvikens IF	22	9	5	8	34	47	−13	23	
8	Halmstads BK	22	6	9	7	35	38	−3	21	
9	IFK Göteborg	22	8	3	11	39	41	−2	19	
10	IFK Malmö	22	3	9	10	25	41	−16	15	
11	Västerås SK (R)	22	5	3	14	25	57	−32	13	Relegation to Division 2
12	Hammarby IF (R)	22	2	8	12	24	43	−19	12	Relegation to Division 2

Rules for classification: 1) points; 2) goal difference; 3) number of goals scored.
(C) Champions; (R) Relegated

== Results ==
Home \ Away	AIK	DIF	GAIS	HBK	HAIF	HÄIF	IFKG	IFKM	IFKN	MFF	SIF	VSK
AIK		2–1	4–0	2–2	2–1	1–2	2–0	5–1	0–1	1–1	2–0	1–2
Djurgårdens IF	2–1		0–5	2–2	2–0	1–1	4–1	1–0	3–4	2–1	1–2	1–0
GAIS	2–1	0–1		4–4	1–1	1–4	1–2	2–1	1–0	0–1	1–1	2–1
Halmstads BK	1–1	0–0	1–2		3–1	1–0	4–2	4–2	0–4	0–2	2–4	1–2
Hammarby IF	0–0	2–5	4–2	2–0		1–1	3–6	1–1	0–2	1–3	1–2	2–3
Hälsingborgs IF	5–2	2–2	1–3	1–1	0–0		3–1	1–1	2–1	0–0	0–0	3–0
IFK Göteborg	0–1	0–1	2–4	1–1	0–0	0–2		2–0	1–2	5–3	3–2	3–1
IFK Malmö	0–2	1–1	4–2	0–1	2–2	2–2	2–1		0–3	0–0	1–1	3–0
IFK Norrköping	2–0	3–1	0–2	2–2	3–0	4–2	1–3	5–1		5–2	4–0	6–2
Malmö FF	4–4	1–1	8–2	1–0	3–1	1–2	2–0	0–0	1–2		3–1	8–1
Sandvikens IF	2–1	4–3	1–9	2–2	1–0	2–1	1–1	3–1	1–5	1–3		0–1
Västerås SK	1–4	1–0	0–0	1–3	1–1	1–2	1–5	2–2	1–5	1–2	2–3	

Legend: Blue = home team win; Yellow = draw; Red = away team win.

== Attendances ==
#	Club	Average	Highest
1	IFK Göteborg	15,559	25,943
2	Malmö FF	15,540	21,408
3	AIK	14,315	34,640
4	GAIS	13,422	26,322
5	Djurgårdens IF	12,375	16,594
6	IFK Malmö	10,946	20,533
7	Hälsingborgs IF	10,765	19,290
8	Västerås SK FK	9,078	12,790
9	Sandvikens IF	8,943	11,846
10	IFK Norrköping	8,843	12,505
11	Hammarby IF	8,840	16,483
12	Halmstads BK	8,223	11,497
