= 1955–56 Allsvenskan =

32nd season of Allsvenskan

Allsvenskan
- Season: 1955–56
- Champions: IFK Norrköping
- Relegated: Norrby IF; Degerfors IF
- Top goalscorer: Sylve Bengtsson, Halmstads BK (22)
- Average attendance: 12,207

These are the statistics for the 1955–56 season of Allsvenskan, the top tier of the Swedish football league system.

== Overview ==
The league was contested by 12 teams, with IFK Norrköping winning the championship.

== League table ==
Pos	Team	Pld	W	D	L	GF	GA	GD	Pts	Qualification or relegation
1	IFK Norrköping (C)	22	16	3	3	46	20	+26	35	Qualification to European Cup first round
2	Malmö FF	22	14	4	4	60	26	+34	32	
3	Djurgårdens IF	22	12	3	7	49	38	+11	27	
4	Sandvikens IF	22	11	2	9	49	33	+16	24	
5	AIK	22	11	2	9	53	42	+11	24	
6	IFK Göteborg	22	10	3	9	30	35	−5	23	
7	Halmstads BK	22	9	4	9	43	45	−2	22	
8	Hälsingborgs IF	22	9	1	12	32	31	+1	19	
9	Hammarby IF	22	8	3	11	25	35	−10	19	
10	Västerås SK	22	6	3	13	30	67	−37	15	
11	Norrby IF (R)	22	3	6	13	30	52	−22	12	Relegation to Division 2
12	Degerfors IF (R)	22	3	6	13	24	47	−23	12	Relegation to Division 2

Rules for classification: 1) points; 2) goal difference; 3) number of goals scored.
(C) Champions; (R) Relegated

== Results ==
Home \ Away	AIK	DEG	DJU	HBK	HAIF	HÄIF	IFKG	IFKN	MFF	NIF	SIF	VSK
AIK		3–2	3–1	4–1	6–1	1–0	4–0	1–2	0–0	5–3	2–2	5–0
Degerfors IF	3–0		1–3	4–4	2–1	1–2	0–0	0–1	2–3	1–1	1–1	1–2
Djurgårdens IF	2–1	4–1		2–0	4–1	5–0	1–2	3–0	0–4	1–0	1–4	4–2
Halmstads BK	4–3	1–0	3–2		2–2	1–0	1–0	1–1	3–4	4–1	4–2	1–3
Hammarby IF	0–2	3–0	2–1	0–0		1–0	3–0	0–1	0–1	1–2	0–1	1–0
Hälsingborgs IF	3–0	1–2	1–2	3–0	0–1		1–2	0–3	4–1	2–3	3–2	1–0
IFK Göteborg	2–5	1–0	5–2	0–1	2–0	0–0		1–0	1–1	1–0	4–2	2–3
IFK Norrköping	4–0	2–1	1–1	4–1	4–1	2–0	3–0		2–1	3–2	2–0	2–0
Malmö FF	4–2	6–1	1–1	1–0	4–1	0–3	5–0	5–2		5–1	2–0	7–0
Norrby IF	2–5	0–0	2–3	5–2	2–2	1–2	0–4	0–0	0–0		0–2	1–3
Sandvikens IF	4–0	7–0	0–2	4–0	1–2	2–0	1–2	1–3	2–0	4–2		4–2
Västerås SK	2–1	1–1	4–4	0–9	0–2	1–6	2–1	1–4	1–5	2–2	1–3	

Legend: Blue = home team win; Yellow = draw; Red = away team win.

== Attendances ==
#	Club	Average	Highest
1	AIK	17,402	35,663
2	IFK Göteborg	17,345	27,871
3	Malmö FF	16,515	22,436
4	Djurgårdens IF	15,148	33,003
5	Hammarby IF	11,822	24,924
6	IFK Norrköping	11,459	31,737
7	Sandvikens IF	10,989	19,958
8	Västerås SK FK	10,543	14,424
9	Norrby IF	9,971	12,801
10	Hälsingborgs IF	9,903	18,568
11	Halmstads BK	8,618	11,746
12	Degerfors IF	5,707	9,135
