= 1933–34 Allsvenskan =

10th season of Allsvenskan

Allsvenskan
- Season: 1933–34
- Champions: Hälsingborgs IF
- Relegated: IS Halmia; Malmö FF (disqualified)
- Top goalscorer: Sven Jonasson, IF Elfsborg (20)
- Average attendance: 7,555

Statistics of Allsvenskan in season 1933/1934.

== Overview ==
The league was contested by 12 teams, with Hälsingborgs IF winning the championship.

Malmö FF was disqualified after 13 rounds. The reason for this was that rivals IFK Malmö had learned that Malmö FF had given their players watches for Christmas, which was a violation of the amateur rules of the time. As a result, all nine of Malmö FF's matches during the spring were cancelled. As of 2023, this is the lowest points total a team has recorded in the Allsvenskan.

== League table ==
Pos	Team	Pld	W	D	L	GF	GA	GD	Pts	Qualification or relegation
1	Hälsingborgs IF (C)	20	13	1	6	49	35	+14	27	
2	GAIS	20	12	2	6	54	34	+20	26	
3	IFK Göteborg	20	11	3	6	52	38	+14	25	
4	Halmstads BK	20	9	4	7	43	38	+5	22	
5	Örgryte IS	20	9	3	8	38	35	+3	21	
6	IF Elfsborg	20	7	6	7	45	44	+1	20	
7	AIK	20	6	6	8	40	42	−2	18	
8	Sandvikens IF	20	7	3	10	49	57	−8	17	
9	IFK Eskilstuna	20	7	3	10	42	52	−10	17	
10	Gefle IF	20	6	4	10	37	56	−19	16	
11	IS Halmia (R)	20	3	5	12	23	41	−18	11	Relegation to Division 2
12	Malmö FF (D, R)	13	5	0	8	27	38	−11	0 (Note: Malmö FF were excluded from Allsvenskan after thirteen rounds for breaking the amateur rules by paying their players. Their thirteen match results are not included in the table of the other teams.)	Relegation to Division 2

Rules for classification: 1) points; 2) goal difference; 3) number of goals scored.
The table, for all clubs except Malmö FF, shows matches played, except against Malmö FF. All other clubs had played Malmö FF once or twice. (For Malmö FF are their 13 played matches shown.)
(C) Champions; (D) Disqualified; (R) Relegated

== Results ==
Home \ Away	AIK	GAIS	GIF	HBK	HIF	IFE	IFKE	IFKG	ISH	SIF	ÖIS
AIK		0–3	4–2	2–3	2–5	1–1	2–0	2–3	3–0	1–1	2–2
GAIS	2–3		1–2	3–3	2–1	3–1	2–2	0–1	5–2	5–1	2–1
Gefle IF	2–1	2–5		1–3	2–2	1–1	2–2	4–3	3–2	2–3	1–0
Halmstads BK	2–2	0–3	4–1		0–1	4–4	4–1	1–2	0–0	1–2	5–1
Hälsingborgs IF	1–3	3–1	5–1	1–4		2–1	3–1	0–1	2–0	7–2	2–1
IF Elfsborg	2–4	1–3	2–2	3–1	4–2		4–1	2–2	1–0	4–3	3–2
IFK Eskilstuna	4–2	1–5	7–4	2–3	2–3	1–1		2–9	3–0	4–1	0–1
IFK Göteborg	3–3	1–2	4–0	1–3	2–4	2–1	4–3		3–1	5–2	4–0
IS Halmia	0–0	2–1	2–1	1–2	1–2	1–2	0–2	1–1		3–3	2–1
Sandvikens IF	5–3	2–3	2–3	6–0	1–3	5–4	1–2	4–1	3–2		1–3
Örgryte IS	1–0	5–3	3–1	1–0	4–0	4–3	1–2	3–0	3–3	1–1	

Legend: Blue = home team win; Yellow = draw; Red = away team win.

== Attendances ==
#	Club	Average	Highest
1	AIK	14,553	21,869
2	IFK Göteborg	12,340	22,820
3	Örgryte IS	10,426	15,455
4	GAIS	8,375	13,474
5	Hälsingborgs IF	7,891	10,875
6	Halmstads BK	5,872	10,411
7	IF Elfsborg	5,653	8,853
8	Gefle IF	4,811	7,208
9	IFK Eskilstuna	4,669	7,826
10	IS Halmia	4,460	7,457
11	Sandvikens IF	4,061	8,529
