= 1940–41 Allsvenskan =

17th season of Allsvenskan

Allsvenskan
- Season: 1940–41
- Champions: Hälsingborgs IF
- Relegated: IK Brage; IK Sleipner
- Top goalscorer: Stig Nyström, IK Brage (17)
- Average attendance: 4,830

Statistics of Allsvenskan in season 1940/1941.

== Overview ==
The league was contested by 12 teams, with Hälsingborgs IF winning the championship.

== League table ==
Pos	Team	Pld	W	D	L	GF	GA	GD	Pts	Qualification or relegation
1	Hälsingborgs IF (C)	22	14	3	5	46	26	+20	31	
2	Degerfors IF	22	12	5	5	47	28	+19	29	
3	AIK	22	11	4	7	45	36	+9	26	
4	IF Elfsborg	22	11	3	8	54	37	+17	25	
5	Landskrona BoIS	22	8	9	5	36	36	0	25	
6	IFK Göteborg	22	8	6	8	42	36	+6	22	
7	IFK Norrköping	22	8	6	8	35	32	+3	22	
8	Malmö FF	22	7	8	7	33	33	0	22	
9	Gårda	22	7	4	11	31	42	−11	18	
10	Sandvikens IF	22	6	6	10	30	42	−12	18	
11	IK Brage (R)	22	6	4	12	39	53	−14	16	Relegation to Division 2
12	IK Sleipner (R)	22	3	4	15	28	65	−37	10	Relegation to Division 2

Rules for classification: 1) points; 2) goal difference; 3) number of goals scored.
(C) Champions; (R) Relegated

== Results ==
Home \ Away	AIK	DIF	GBK	HIF	IFE	IFKG	IFKN	IKB	IKS	BOIS	MFF	SIF
AIK		1–2	2–1	1–3	3–1	3–0	0–0	3–1	4–0	3–2	3–1	2–1
Degerfors IF	1–4		2–1	2–1	1–1	2–1	2–0	6–0	3–1	6–0	1–1	3–0
Gårda BK	0–0	4–0		2–1	1–1	2–2	0–2	3–1	2–1	0–1	3–1	1–4
Hälsingborgs IF	3–2	0–1	1–0		0–2	3–1	1–0	3–2	4–1	1–1	3–2	4–0
IF Elfsborg	5–0	1–3	5–2	0–3		3–1	3–1	5–1	2–3	2–3	2–1	4–1
IFK Göteborg	2–0	1–0	2–0	1–2	3–2		1–3	5–2	2–0	3–3	0–0	2–4
IFK Norrköping	3–3	2–0	5–1	2–0	2–6	0–2		3–0	2–0	1–1	1–1	1–0
IK Brage	3–2	2–2	5–1	0–2	2–2	2–1	2–0		7–3	1–2	2–0	1–1
IK Sleipner	2–3	3–3	2–3	1–5	1–3	0–7	2–2	1–1		2–2	1–2	2–0
Landskrona BoIS	1–1	3–2	1–0	2–2	2–4	0–0	1–1	2–1	5–1		2–0	1–1
Malmö FF	3–1	1–1	2–3	1–1	1–0	3–3	3–2	2–1	3–0	3–1		1–1
Sandvikens IF	1–4	0–4	1–1	2–3	2–0	2–2	3–2	4–2	0–1	1–0	1–1	

Legend: Blue = home team win; Yellow = draw; Red = away team win.

== Attendances ==
#	Club	Average	Highest
1	AIK	8,708	14,326
2	Malmö FF	7,843	10,739
3	IFK Göteborg	6,894	13,170
4	Hälsingborgs IF	5,325	7,651
5	IFK Norrköping	4,932	10,090
6	IF Elfsborg	4,464	7,063
7	IK Sleipner	4,272	7,948
8	Gårda BK	4,028	10,342
9	Degerfors IF	3,450	5,268
10	IK Brage	3,396	6,000
11	Landskrona BoIS	2,803	4,417
12	Sandvikens IF	2,437	3,186
