= Göteborgs FF =

Swedish football club

- Full name: Göteborgs Fotbollförening
- Founded: 1897; 128 years ago
- Ground: Walhalla IP (historical), Majvallen (present), Gothenburg; Sweden
- Chairman: Magnus Olsson
- League: Division 4 Göteborg B
- 2021: Division 4 Göteborg B, 4th
Home colours	Away colours

Göteborgs FF is a Swedish football club located in Gothenburg.

== Background ==
Göteborgs Fotbollförening was founded on 20 August 1897 and is located in Gothenburg. The club is two times runners-up in Svenska Mästerskapet (first in 1899 and then in 1903) which decided the Swedish Champions in early Swedish football. The club was considered a feeder club of Örgryte IS, and played their home matches at Walhalla IP which was owned by Örgryte.

The club participated in the two first seasons of Svenska Serien, finishing fifth in 1910, and being excluded after the season, but then being readmitted the next season since two clubs withdrew after only one game. They finished sixth that season, but where excluded once again to never return to a national league again, even though they played in Svenska Mästerskapet after that.

In recent years Göteborgs Fotbollförening has participated mainly in the lower divisions of the Swedish football league system. The club currently plays in Division 4 Göteborg B which is the sixth tier of Swedish football. They play their home matches at the Majvallen in Gothenburg.

Göteborgs FF are affiliated to the Göteborgs Fotbollförbund. Göteborgs FF have competed in the Svenska Cupen on 23 occasions and have played 74 matches in the competition.

== Achievements ==
- Svenska Mästerskapet
  - Runners-up (2): 1899, 1903

== Season to season ==
In the 1940s Göteborgs FF competed in the following divisions:

Season	Level	Division	Section	Position	Movements
1942–43	Tier 3	Division 3	Västsvenska Södra	7th	
1943–44	Tier 3	Division 3	Västsvenska Södra	2nd	
1944–45	Tier 3	Division 3	Västsvenska Södra	1st	Promotion Playoffs – Promoted
1945–46	Tier 2	Division 2	Västra	7th	
1946–47	Tier 2	Division 2	Västra	8th	Relegated
1947–48	Tier 3	Division 3	Västra	9th	Relegated

In recent seasons Göteborgs FF have competed in the following divisions:

Season	Level	Division	Section	Position	Movements
1999	Tier 6	Division 5	Göteborg B	6th	
2000	Tier 6	Division 5	Göteborg B	8th	
2001	Tier 6	Division 5	Göteborg B	4th	
2002	Tier 6	Division 5	Göteborg B	6th	
2003	Tier 6	Division 5	Göteborg B	6th	
2004	Tier 6	Division 5	Göteborg B	10th	
2005	Tier 6	Division 5	Göteborg B	7th	
2006*	Tier 7	Division 5	Göteborg B	9th	
2007	Tier 7	Division 5	Göteborg B	11th	Relegated
2008	Tier 8	Division 6	Göteborg C	1st	Promoted
2009	Tier 7	Division 5	Göteborg B	1st	Promoted
2010	Tier 6	Division 4	Göteborg B	8th	
2011	Tier 6	Division 4	Göteborg B	1st	Promoted
2012	Tier 5	Division 3	Nordvästra Götaland	12th	Relegated
2013	Tier 6	Division 4	Göteborg B	7th	
2014	Tier 6	Division 4	Göteborg B	7th	
2015	Tier 6	Division 4	Göteborg B	8th	
2016	Tier 6	Division 4	Göteborg B	6th	
2017	Tier 6	Division 4	Göteborg B	2nd	Promotion Playoffs - Not Promoted
2018	Tier 6	Division 4	Göteborg B	3rd	
2019	Tier 6	Division 4	Göteborg B	3rd	
2020	Tier 6	Division 4	Göteborg B	9th	
2021	Tier 6	Division 4	Göteborg B	4th	

* League restructuring in 2006 resulted in a new division being created at Tier 3 and subsequent divisions dropping a level.

== Attendances ==
In recent seasons Göteborgs FF have had the following average attendances:

Season	Average attendance	Division / Section	Level
2012	118	Div 3 Nordvästra Götaland	Tier 5
2013	57	Div 4 Göteborg B	Tier 6
2014	57	Div 4 Göteborg B	Tier 6
2015	62	Div 4 Göteborg B	Tier 6
2016	80	Div 4 Göteborg B	Tier 6
2017	47	Div 4 Göteborg B	Tier 6
2018	?	Div 4 Göteborg B	Tier 6
2019	?	Div 4 Göteborg B	Tier 6
2020	?	Div 4 Göteborg B	Tier 6

* Attendances are provided in the Publikliga sections of the Svenska Fotbollförbundet website.

* League restructuring in 2006 resulted in a new division being created at Tier 3 and subsequent divisions dropping a level. |}
