= IS Idrottens Vänner =

Swedish football club

- Full name: Idrottssällskapet Idrottens Vänner
- Short name: IS Idrottens Vänner
- Founded: July 21, 1882; 142 years ago
- Ground: Gothenburg

IS Idrottens Vänner – was a Swedish football club which was located in Gothenburg. The association is best known for having played the first edition of the Swedish championship in 1896, when Örgryte IS won and they became the first Swedish champions ever.

In 1901, the association was incorporated into Göteborgs IF.
