= Idrottsplatsen =

Former sports venue in Gothenburg, Sweden

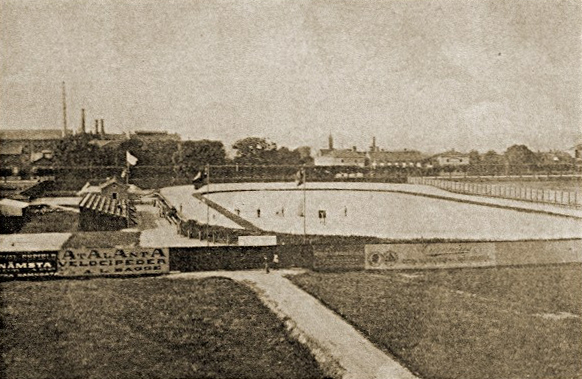
- Idrottsplatsen at the turn of the century
- Interactive map of Idrottsplatsen
- Location: Gothenburg, Sweden
- Coordinates: 57.705833°N 11.980833°E
- Owner: Göteborgs VK (1896–1900); Göteborgs IF (1900–1915)
- Capacity: 600 (seated)
- Type: Sports venue
- Surface: Dirt

Construction
- Groundbreaking: 1895
- Built: 1895–1896
- Opened: 28 June 1896
- Demolished: 1915–1916
- Cost: SEK 28,000
- Architect: Frans Frise

Tenants
- Göteborgs VK 1896–1900; Göteborgs IF 1900–1915; IFK Göteborg 1905–1908, 1910–1915

Idrottsplatsen (transl. The Sports Field) is a former sports stadium in Gothenburg, Sweden. The stadium was in use between 1896 and 1915, and was located on the same site as the current Gamla Ullevi stadium.

== History ==
The stadium was originally built as a combination of velodrome and football stadium by track cycling club Göteborgs Velocipedklubb in 1895–1896. Idrottsplatsen was opened on 28 June 1896, even though the curves of the velodrome were not fully completed until 1907. The centre field could be used for athletics as well, and during winter it was watered and used for ice skating in sub-zero conditions. The venue also featured an indoor tennis court and six outdoor courts, completed in 1901.

Idrottsplatsen had one stand with room for 600 seated spectators. But many more could attend events; the wrestling exhibition match in 1896 between GAIS wrestler Carl Gustafsson and Ottoman royal court wrestler Memisch Effendi set a record attendance of 10,000.

Göteborgs VK merged with IS Lyckans Soldater and Skridskosällskapet Norden in 1900 to form the new club Göteborgs IF, which took ownership of the venue. They offered IFK Göteborg to share the stadium in 1906, which was accepted. Due to a conflict in 1909, IFK temporarily moved to Balders Hage, but moved back to Idrottsplatsen the following year.

The Swedish national team made their international debut in July 1908, winning 11–3 against Norway (who also made their international debut) in front of 2,000–3,000 people at Idrottsplatsen.

Tough competition from Walhalla IP that opened in 1908 gradually worsened the economy of Idrottsplatsen, and plans for a more modern stadium materialised. In 1915, Idrottsplatsen was started to be demolished to make room for its replacement, Ullevi, which opened in 1916.
