= Wilhelm Friberg =

Swedish football manager (1865–1932)

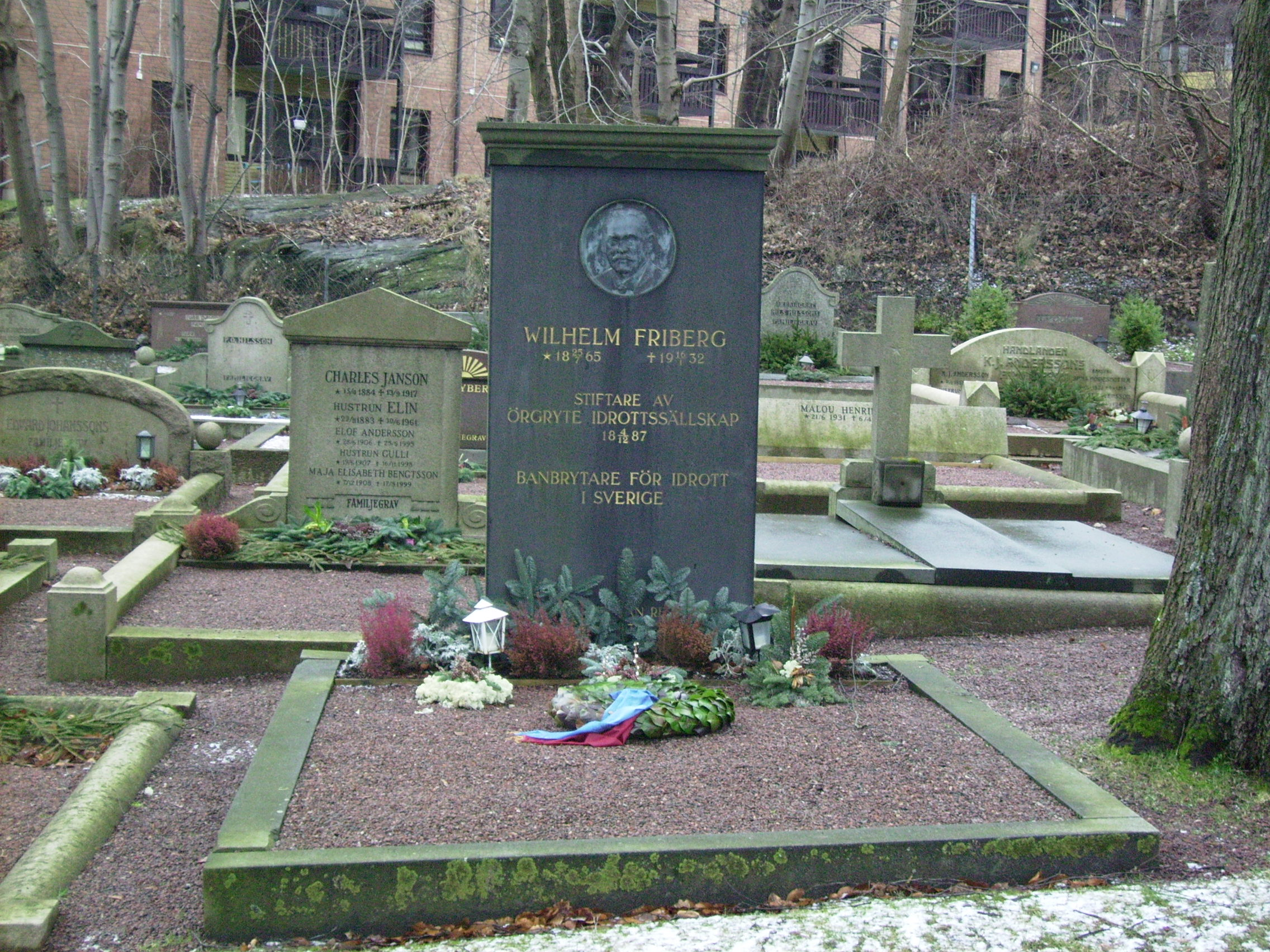
Wilhelm Fribergs grave at Örgryte nya kyrkogård in Gothenburg.

Wilhelm Friberg (25 July 1865–16 January 1932) was a Swedish football manager and pioneer in Swedish football. He was one of the founders of Örgryte IS, the dominating club in early Swedish football. He was chairman of the club from the start in 1887 to 1926. He was also one of the founders of the Swedish Sport Association, the Swedish Ballgame Association and the Swedish Football Association, of which he was chairman from 1908 to 1917.
