= Svenska Mästerskapet =

Swedish national association football championship

- Status: Inactive
- Genre: Sporting event
- Date: Summertime season
- Frequency: Annual
- Country: Sweden
- Inaugurated: 1896
- Most recent: 1925

Svenska Mästerskapet was a Swedish football competition held as a cup to decide the Swedish Champions between 1896 and 1925. It was held during a short period, and all games were often played in either Gothenburg or Stockholm. For many years only teams from Gothenburg and Stockholm participated.

The Swedish Championship knockout competition was last played in 1925. The 1924–1925 season saw the start of the nationwide league Allsvenskan, and from the 1930–1931 season the Allsvenskan winners have been crowned Swedish Champions, except for the years 1982–1990 when Allsvenskan was followed by the Swedish Championship Playoffs and 1991 and 1992 when Allsvenskan was followed by Mästerskapsserien, both to determine the Swedish Champions.

== Previous winners ==
Season	Winners	Runners-up
1896	Örgryte IS (1)	IS Idrottens Vänner
1897	Örgryte IS (2)	Örgryte IS 2
1898	Örgryte IS (3)	AIK
1899	Örgryte IS (4)	Göteborgs FF
1900	AIK (1)	Örgryte IS
1901	AIK (2)	Örgryte IS 2
1902	Örgryte IS (5)	Jönköpings AIF
1903	Göteborgs IF (1)	Göteborgs FF
1904	Örgryte IS (6)	Djurgårdens IF
1905	Örgryte IS (7)	IFK Stockholm
1906	Örgryte IS (8)	Djurgårdens IF
1907	Örgryte IS (9)	IFK Uppsala
1908	IFK Göteborg (1)	IFK Uppsala
1909	Örgryte IS (10)	Djurgårdens IF
1910	IFK Göteborg (2)	Djurgårdens IF
1911	AIK (3)	IFK Uppsala
1912	Djurgårdens IF (1)	Örgryte IS
1913	Örgryte IS (11)	Djurgårdens IF
1914	AIK (4)	Helsingborgs IF
1915	Djurgårdens IF (2)	Örgryte IS
1916	AIK (5)	Djurgårdens IF
1917	Djurgårdens IF (3)	AIK
1918	IFK Göteborg (3)	Helsingborgs IF
1919	GAIS (1)	Djurgårdens IF
1920	Djurgårdens IF (4)	IK Sleipner
1921	IFK Eskilstuna (1)	IK Sleipner
1922	GAIS (2)	Hammarby IF
1923	AIK (6)	IFK Eskilstuna
1924	Fässbergs IF (1)	IK Sirius
1925	Brynäs IF (1)	BK Derby

== Cup champions ==
Titles	Club
11	Örgryte IS
6	AIK
4	Djurgårdens IF
3	IFK Göteborg
2	GAIS
1	Brynäs IF
1	IFK Eskilstuna
1	Fässbergs IF
1	Göteborgs IF

== See also ==
- Allsvenskan
- Svenska Cupen
