= IFK Gävle =

Swedish sports club

- Full name: Idrottsföreningen Kamraterna Gävle
- Founded: March 12, 1897; 128 years ago
- Dissolved: November 2013; 11 years ago

IFK Gävle was a sports club in Gävle, Sweden. It was founded on 12 March 1897 and the club used the old spelling of their home town's name, IFK Gefle, until 1943.

The club has been active in a great number of different sports, like bandy, figure skating, gymnastics, handball, ice hockey, football, tennis and athletics. From 2001, only the women's football team section remained until the club was dissolved in November 2013.

The club was runner-up to the Swedish bandy championship in 1907, where the final game, played at home ice, was lost against IFK Uppsala.

== Honours ==
=== Domestic ===
- Swedish Champions:
  - Runners-up (1): 1907
