= IFK Uppsala Fotboll =

Swedish football club

IFK Uppsala
- Full name: Idrottsföreningen; Kamraterna Uppsala
- Founded: 1895
- Ground: Studenternas IP, Uppsala, Österängens IP
- Capacity: 5,800 & 980
- League: Division 2 Norra Svealand
Home colours	Away colours

IFK Uppsala is a Swedish football club, and the football section (the other one is bandy) of IFK Uppsala, located in Uppsala. The club, formed 1895, was one of the leading Swedish clubs in the early 20th century. They played two seasons in the highest league at the time, Svenska Serien, and also played three Swedish Championship finals, losing all. IFK Uppsala currently plays in the lower leagues of Swedish football.

== Achievements ==
- Svenska Mästerskapet:
  - Runners-up (3): 1907, 1908, 1911
- Corinthian Bowl:
  - Runners-up (1): 1909
- Kamratmästerskapen:
  - Runners-up (1): 1902
