= Göteborgs IF =

Association football club

- Full name: Göteborgs Idrottsförbund
- Founded: 16 november 1900
- Dissolved: 1909

Göteborgs Idrottsförbund (Göteborgs IF) was a Swedish football club which was located in Gothenburg. They won the Swedish Championship in 1903. The club was founded in 1900 when the three clubs Göteborgs Velocipedklubb, Skridskosällskapet Norden and Idrottssällskapet Lyckans Soldater merged.

== Achievements ==
- Swedish Champions (Note: The title of "Swedish Champions" has been awarded to the winner of four different competitions over the years. Between 1896 and 1925 the title was awarded to the winner of Svenska Mästerskapet, a stand-alone cup tournament. No club were given the title between 1926 and 1930 even though the first-tier league Allsvenskan was played. In 1931 the title was reinstated and awarded to the winner of Allsvenskan. Between 1982 and 1990 a play-off in cup format was held at the end of the league season to decide the champions. After the play-off format in 1991 and 1992 the title was decided by the winner of Mästerskapsserien, an additional league after the end of Allsvenskan. Since the 1993 season the title has once again been awarded to the winner of Allsvenskan.)
  - Winners (1): 1903
