= IFK Eskilstuna =

Swedish football club

- Full name: Idrottsföreningen Kamraterna Eskilstuna
- Founded: 9 September 1897; 128 years ago
- Ground: Tunavallen, Eskilstuna
- Capacity: 8,800
- Chairman: Bengt Bandstigen
- Head coach: Armin Suljic
- League: Division 3 Mellersta Svealand
- 2024: Division 2 Södra Svealand, 12th of 14
- Website: www.laget.se/IFKEskilstuna
Home colours	Away colours

Idrottsföreningen Kamraterna Eskilstuna, commonly known as IFK Eskilstuna, or, especially earlier, Eskilstuna-Kamraterna, is a Swedish football club located in Eskilstuna, Södermanland County. In their early seasons, IFK played in Allsvenskan, the top division of the Swedish football league, but now plays in Division 3, the fifth tier of Swedish football. IFK Eskilstuna are affiliated with the Södermanlands Fotbollförbund.

== Background ==
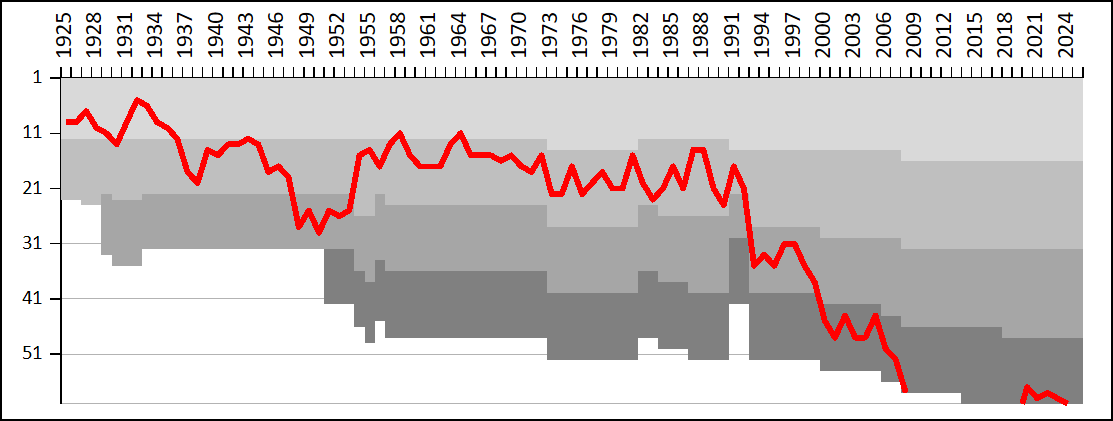
A chart showing the progress of IFK Eskilstuna through the swedish football league system. The different shades of gray represent league divisions.

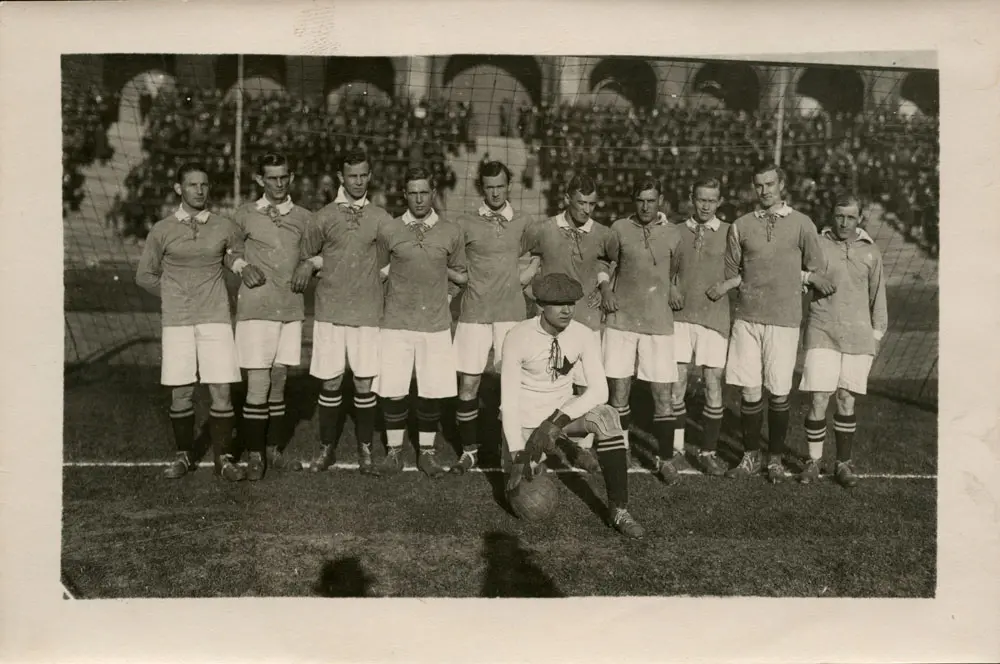
1921 Swedish Championship winning team

IFK Eskilstuna was founded on 9 September 1897 as the 7th Idrottsföreningen Kamraterna. In the beginning, IFK Eskilstuna practiced athletics, especially running events, and had a ground in Djurgården in Eskilstuna. Speed skater Herman Söderbäck won the national championship titles in 500 metres in 1900 and 1906. IFK Eskilstuna severals sports in the first half of the 20th century, among them handball, ice hockey and cross-country skiing and orienteering.

The football team was started in 1901 and played in the 1910 Svenska Serien. The club maintains a long rivalry with Eskilstuna City FK. In 1910, IFK participated in the first Svenska Serien along with IFK Göteborg, Örgryte IS, AIK and IFK Norrköping. Their first championship final match took place in 1921, when IFK defeated IK Sleipner 2–1 at the Stockholm Olympic Stadium before 11,695 spectators. They competed in another championship final match in 1923, which resulted in a 5–1 loss to AIK.

IFK competed in the very first Allsvenskan season in 1924–25, and played a further 13 seasons in the Allsvenskan from 1924–25 to 1928–29, from 1930–31 to 1935–36, in 1942–43, in 1957–58, and in 1964. Their best season was in the 1931–32 Allsvenskan when they finished in fifth place. The marathon table of Allsvenskan teams shows IFK in 23rd position, their last season at the highest level being in 1964.

The club also played bandy and was playing in the then Swedish top-tier league Division 1 for two years in the 1930s.

IFK reached the Allsvenskan qualifying stage in 1981 after winning Division 2 Norra by pipping Örebro SK to the top position. However, IFK failed to win the play-offs against Kalmar FF to progress to the higher level. The 1987 season proved another near miss when IFK finished in second place, to second place in Division I Norra; Djurgarden. In 1988 history was repeated, this time IFK finished second to Örebro SK.

In 1992, IFK were relegated from Division 1 and subsequently have competed in the middle divisions of the Swedish football league system. The club currently plays in Division 3 Västra Svealand which is the fifth tier of Swedish football. They play their home matches at the Tunavallen in Eskilstuna.

In November 2024, Armin Suljic took over as head coach for the club after Kent Andersson and Sebastian Larsson, who had led the team to relegation from the 2024 Division 2.

The club has an active youth section. In 1970 and 1985, the junior team won the Swedish Junior Championship. Famous footballers who have played for IFK Eskilstuna include Kenneth Andersson and Sebastian Larsson.

== Season results ==
Season	Level	Division	Section	Position	Movements
1923–24	Tier 2	Svenska Serien	Östra Gruppen	3rd	
1924–25	Tier 1	Allsvenskan		9th	
1925–26	Tier 1	Allsvenskan		9th	
1926–27	Tier 1	Allsvenskan		7th	
1927–28	Tier 1	Allsvenskan		10th	
1928–29	Tier 1	Allsvenskan		11th	Relegated
1929–30	Tier 2	Division 2	Norra	1st	Promoted
1930–31	Tier 1	Allsvenskan		9th	
1931–32	Tier 1	Allsvenskan		5th	
1932–33	Tier 1	Allsvenskan		6th	
1933–34	Tier 1	Allsvenskan		9th	
1934–35	Tier 1	Allsvenskan		10th	
1935–36	Tier 1	Allsvenskan		12th	Relegated
1936–37	Tier 2	Division 2	Östra	6th	
1937–38	Tier 2	Division 2	Östra	8th	
1938–39	Tier 2	Division 2	Östra	2nd	
1939–40	Tier 2	Division 2	Östra	3rd	
1940–41	Tier 2	Division 2	Östra	1st	Promotion Playoffs
1941–42	Tier 2	Division 2	Östra	1st	Promotion Playoffs – Promoted
1942–43	Tier 1	Allsvenskan		12th	Relegated
1943–44	Tier 2	Division 2	Östra	1st	Promotion Playoffs
1944–45	Tier 2	Division 2	Östra	6th	
1945–46	Tier 2	Division 2	Östra	5th	
1946–47	Tier 2	Division 2	Östra	7th	Relegated
1947–48	Tier 3	Division 3	Östra	6th	
1948–49	Tier 3	Division 3	Östra	3rd	
1949–50	Tier 3	Division 3	Östra	7th	
1950–51	Tier 3	Division 3	Östra	3rd	
1951–52	Tier 3	Division 3	Östra	4th	
1952–53	Tier 3	Division 3	Östra	3rd	Promoted
1953–54	Tier 2	Division 2	Svealand	3rd	
1954–55	Tier 2	Division 2	Svealand	2nd	
1955–56	Tier 2	Division 2	Svealand	5th	
1956–57	Tier 2	Division 2	Svealand	1st	Promotion Playoffs – Promoted
1957–58	Tier 1	Allsvenskan		11th	Relegated
1959	Tier 2	Division 2	Svealand	3rd	
1960	Tier 2	Division 2	Svealand	5th	
1961	Tier 2	Division 2	Svealand	5th	
1962	Tier 2	Division 2	Svealand	5th	
1963	Tier 2	Division 2	Svealand	1st	Promotion Playoffs – Promoted
1964	Tier 1	Allsvenskan		11th	Relegated
1965	Tier 2	Division 2	Svealand	3rd	
1966	Tier 2	Division 2	Svealand	3rd	
1967	Tier 2	Division 2	Svealand	3rd	
1968	Tier 2	Division 2	Svealand	4th	
1969	Tier 2	Division 2	Svealand	3rd	
1970	Tier 2	Division 2	Svealand	5th	
1971	Tier 2	Division 2	Svealand	6th	
1972	Tier 2	Division 2	Mellersta	3rd	
1973	Tier 2	Division 2	Norra	8th	
1974	Tier 2	Division 2	Norra	8th	
1975	Tier 2	Division 2	Norra	3rd	
1976	Tier 2	Division 2	Norra	8th	
1977	Tier 2	Division 2	Norra	6th	
1978	Tier 2	Division 2	Norra	4th	
1979	Tier 2	Division 2	Norra	7th	
1980	Tier 2	Division 2	Norra	7th	
1981	Tier 2	Division 2	Norra	1st	Promotion Playoffs
1982	Tier 2	Division 2	Norra	8th	
1983	Tier 2	Division 2	Norra	11th	
1984	Tier 2	Division 2	Norra	9th	
1985	Tier 2	Division 2	Norra	5th	
1986	Tier 2	Division 2	Norra	9th	
1987	Tier 2	Division 1	Norra	2nd	
1988	Tier 2	Division 1	Norra	2nd	
1989	Tier 2	Division 1	Norra	9th	
1990	Tier 2	Division 1	Norra	12th	
1991	Tier 2	Division 1	Östra	7th	Spring
	Tier 2	Division 1	Östra (Höst)	3rd	Autumn
1992	Tier 2	Division 1	Östra	5th	Spring
	Tier 2	Division 1	Östra (Höst)	7th	Relegated – Autumn
1993	Tier 3	Division 2	Västra Svealand	7th	
1994	Tier 3	Division 2	Västra Svealand	5th	
1995	Tier 3	Division 2	Västra Svealand	7th	
1996	Tier 3	Division 2	Västra Svealand	3rd	
1997	Tier 3	Division 2	Västra Svealand	3rd	
1998	Tier 3	Division 2	Västra Svealand	7th	
1999	Tier 3	Division 2	Västra Svealand	10th	Relegated
2000	Tier 4	Division 3	Västra Svealand	3rd	
2001	Tier 4	Division 3	Västra Svealand	6th	
2002	Tier 4	Division 3	Västra Svealand	2nd	Promotion Playoffs
2003	Tier 4	Division 3	Västra Svealand	6th	
2004	Tier 4	Division 3	Östra Svealand	6th	
2005	Tier 4	Division 3	Västra Svealand	2nd	Promoted
2006*	Tier 4	Division 2	Östra Svealand	6th	
2007	Tier 4	Division 2	Östra Svealand	8th	
2008	Tier 4	Division 2	Södra Svealand	12th	Relegated
2009	Tier 5	Division 3	Södra Svealand	7th	
2010	Tier 5	Division 3	Västra Svealand	4th	
2011	Tier 5	Division 3	Södra Svealand	2nd	Promotion Playoffs
2012	Tier 5	Division 3	Södra Svealand	4th	
2013	Tier 5	Division 3	Västra Svealand	5th	
2014	Tier 5	Division 3	Södra Svealand	10th	Relegated
2015	Tier 6	Division 4	Södermanland	3rd	
2016	Tier 6	Division 4	Södermanland	1st	Promoted
2017	Tier 5	Division 3	Västra Svealand	5th	
2018	Tier 5	Division 3	Västra Svealand	3rd	
2019	Tier 5	Division 3	Södra Svealand	1st	Promoted
2020	Tier 4	Division 2	Södra Svealand		

* League restructuring in 2006 resulted in a new division being created at Tier 3 and subsequent divisions dropping a level.

== Attendance statistics ==
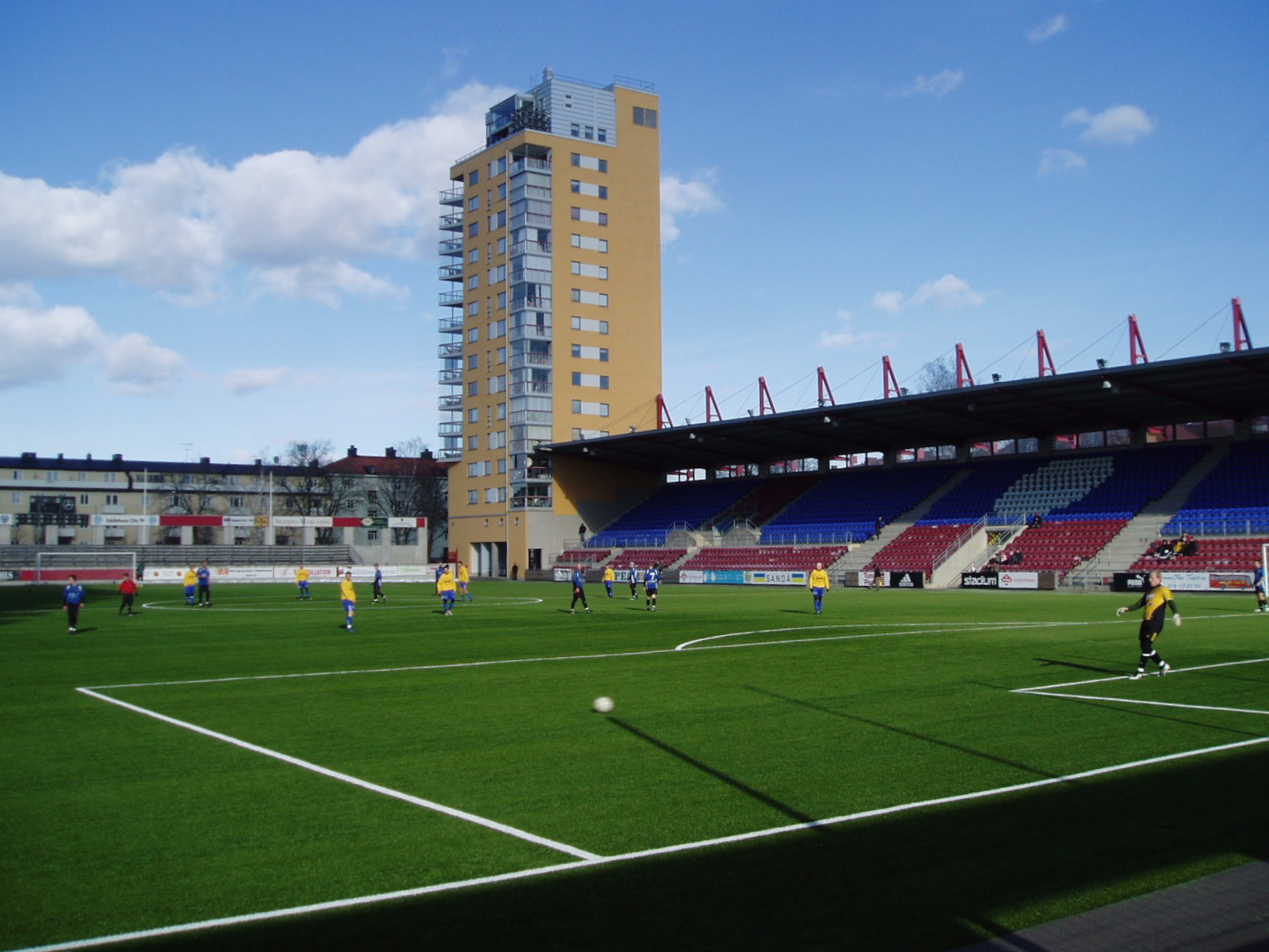
Tunavallen

In recent seasons IFK Eskilstuna have had the following average attendance statistics:

Season	Average attendance	Division / Section	Level
2005	484	Div 3 Västra Svealand	Tier 4
2006	693	Div 2 Östra Svealand	Tier 4
2007	533	Div 2 Östra Svealand	Tier 4
2008	372	Div 2 Södra Svealand	Tier 4
2009	172	Div 3 Södra Svealand	Tier 5
2010	236	Div 3 Västra Svealand	Tier 5
2011	708	Div 3 Södra Svealand	Tier 5
2012	329	Div 3 Södra Svealand	Tier 5
2013	?	Div 3 Västra Svealand	Tier 5
2014	208	Div 3 Södra Svealand	Tier 5
2015	?	Div 4 Södermanland	Tier 6
2016	222	Div 4 Södermanland	Tier 6
2017	196	Div 3 Västra Svealand	Tier 5
2018	228	Div 3 Västra Svealand	Tier 5
2019	?	Div 3 Södra Svealand	Tier 5
2019		Div 2 Södra Svealand	Tier 4

* Attendance statistics are provided in the Publikliga sections of the Svenska Fotbollförbundet website.

The attendance record at Tunavallen was set in 1963 when 22,491 spectators attended the match with GAIS.

== Achievements ==
- Swedish Champions^{[A]}
  - Winners (1): 1921

=== League ===
- Division 1 Norra:
  - Runners-up (2): 1987, 1988

=== Cups ===
- Svenska Mästerskapet:
  - Winners (1): 1921
  - Runners-up (1): 1923

== Footnotes ==
A. The title of "Swedish Champions" has been awarded to the winner of four different competitions over the years. Between 1896 and 1925 the title was awarded to the winner of Svenska Mästerskapet, a stand-alone cup tournament. No club were given the title between 1926 and 1930 even though the first-tier league Allsvenskan was played. In 1931 the title was reinstated and awarded to the winner of Allsvenskan. Between 1982 and 1990 a play-off in cup format was held at the end of the league season to decide the champions. After the play-off format in 1991 and 1992 the title was decided by the winner of Mästerskapsserien, an additional league after the end of Allsvenskan. Since the 1993 season the title has once again been awarded to the winner of Allsvenskan.
