= List of Djurgårdens IF Fotboll seasons =

Chart of yearly table positions of Djurgårdens in the Swedish football league system.

Djurgårdens Idrottsförening, also known simply as Djurgårdens IF, is a Swedish professional association football club based in Stockholm. The club is affiliated with Stockholms Fotbollförbund, and plays home games at 3Arena. The club's first team play in Allsvenskan as of 2015, the top league in Swedish football, which takes place from April to October every seasons. Djurgården won its first Swedish title 1912 Svenska Mästerskapet, and most recently repeated this in the 2019 Allsvenskan.

This is a list of seasons played by Djurgårdens IF in Swedish and European football.

== Seasons ==
| Season | League | | | | | | | | | Cup | Super- cupen | Other | Europe | Top goalscorer (Note: Goals in all competitions (Allsvenskan or lower, Svenska Cupen, Supercupen and European) are counted.) | |
| Season | Division | P | W | D | L | GF | GA | Pts | Pos | Cup | Super- cupen | Other | Europe | Name | Gls |
|---|---|---|---|---|---|---|---|---|---|---|---|---|---|---|---|
| 1899 | n/a | | | | | | | | | | | | | | |
| 1900 | n/a | | | | | | | | | | | | | | |
| 1901 | n/a | | | | | | | | | | | | | | |
| 1902 | Serien | 6 | 6 | 0 | 0 | 36 | 1 | 12 | 1st | | | | | | |
| 1903 | Serie 1 | 2 | 2 | 0 | 0 | 3 | 0 | 4 | – | | | | | | |
| 1904 | n/a | | | | | | | | | | | SM – RU | | | |
| 1905 | Tävlingsserie 1 | 10 | 8 | 2 | 0 | 25 | 6 | 18 | | | | | | | |
| 1906 | Stockholmsserien 1 | 10 | 6 | 3 | 1 | 18 | 5 | 15 | 1st | | | SM – RU | | | |
| 1907 | Stockholmsserien 1 | 10 | 3 | 2 | 5 | 11 | 13 | 8 | 4th | | | | | | |
| 1908 | Stockholmsserien 1 | 9 | 4 | 2 | 3 | 12 | 6 | 10 | 4th | | | | | | |
| 1909 | Stockholmsserien 1 | 8 | 4 | 2 | 2 | 10 | 6 | 10 | 3rd | | | SM – RU | | | |
| 1910 | Stockholmsserien 1 | 14 | 10 | 2 | 2 | 35 | 13 | 22 | 1st | | | SM – RU | | | |
| 1911–12 | Svenska serien | 10 | 6 | 2 | 2 | 19 | 14 | 14 | 2nd | | | | | | |
| 1912–13 | Svenska serien | 10 | 5 | 0 | 5 | 19 | 25 | 10 | 4th | | | SM – W | | | |
| 1913–14 | Svenska serien | 10 | 3 | 4 | 3 | 16 | 27 | 10 | 3rd | | | SM – RU | | | |
| 1913–14 | Centalserien | 10 | 6 | 1 | 3 | 33 | 17 | 13 | 2nd | | | SM – RU | | | |
| 1914–15 | Svenska serien | 8 | 3 | 1 | 4 | 16 | 17 | 7 | 3rd | | | SM – W | | | |
| 1915–16 | Svenska serien | 10 | 2 | 1 | 7 | 15 | 28 | 5 | 6th | | | SM – RU | | | |
| 1916–17 | Svenska serien | 10 | 2 | 2 | 6 | 11 | 20 | 6 | 5th | | | SM – W | | | |
| 1918 | Fyrkantsserien | 6 | 0 | 2 | 4 | 3 | 19 | 2 | 4th | | | | | | |
| 1919 | Fyrkantsserien | 5 | 1 | 2 | 2 | 9 | 13 | 4 | 4th | | | SM – RU | | | |
| 1920–21 | Svenska serien | 18 | 6 | 4 | 8 | 24 | 33 | 16 | 7th | | | SM – W | | | |
| 1921–22 | n/a | | | | | | | | | | | | | | |
| 1922–23 | Svenska serien Östra | 10 | 3 | 3 | 4 | 16 | 19 | 9 | 4th | | | | | | |
| 1923–24 | Svenska serien Östra | 10 | 3 | 1 | 6 | 18 | 18 | 7 | 6th | | | | | | |
| 1924–25 | Div 2 Östsvenska | 20 | 11 | 4 | 5 | 65 | 18 | 26 | 3rd | | | | | | |
| 1925–26 | Div 2 Östsvenska | 20 | 11 | 5 | 4 | 60 | 28 | 76 | 3rd | | | | | | |
| 1926–27 | Div 2 Östsvenska | 18 | 17 | 0 | 1 | 60 | 9 | 34 | 1st | | | | | | |
| 1927–28 | Allsvenskan | 22 | 4 | 6 | 12 | 43 | 66 | 14 | 11th | | | | | | |
| 1928–29 | Div 2 Norra | 18 | 5 | 4 | 9 | 27 | 37 | 14 | 9th | | | | | | |
| 1929–30 | Div 3 Östsvenska | 22 | 15 | 4 | 3 | 74 | 28 | 34 | 1st | | | | | | |
| 1930–31 | Div 3 Östsvenska | 20 | 15 | 3 | 2 | 67 | 20 | 33 | 1st | | | | | | |
| 1931–32 | Div 3 Östsvenska | 18 | 14 | 2 | 2 | 44 | 13 | 30 | 1st | | | | | | |
| 1932–33 | Div 2 Östra | 18 | 9 | 6 | 3 | 38 | 29 | 24 | 3rd | | | | | | |
| 1933–34 | Div 2 Östra | 18 | 12 | 3 | 3 | 42 | 23 | 27 | 2nd | | | | | | |
| 1934–35 | Div 2 Östra | 18 | 7 | 4 | 7 | 30 | 20 | 18 | 4th | | | | | | |
| 1935–36 | Div 2 Östra | 18 | 11 | 4 | 3 | 35 | 22 | 26 | 1st | | | | | | |
| 1936–37 | Allsvenskan | 22 | 6 | 2 | 14 | 39 | 52 | 14 | 11th | | | | | Pelle Karlsson | 10 |
| 1937–38 | Div 2 Norra | 18 | 8 | 6 | 4 | 34 | 26 | 22 | 2nd | | | | | | |
| 1938–39 | Div 2 Norra | 18 | 9 | 4 | 5 | 43 | 32 | 22 | 3rd | | | | | | |
| 1939–40 | Div 2 Norra | 18 | 10 | 6 | 2 | 39 | 17 | 26 | 2nd | | | | | | |
| 1940–41 | Div 2 Norra | 18 | 12 | 3 | 3 | 38 | 20 | 27 | 2nd | n/a | | | | | |
| 1941–42 | Div 2 Norra | 18 | 6 | 4 | 8 | 27 | 26 | 16 | 5th | QR | | | | | |
| 1942–43 | Div 2 Norra | 18 | 8 | 1 | 9 | 46 | 38 | 17 | 6th | R2 | | | | | |
| 1943–44 | Div 2 Norra | 18 | 10 | 3 | 5 | 50 | 23 | 23 | 3rd | QR2 | | | | | |
| 1944–45 | Div 2 Norra | 18 | 13 | 1 | 4 | 51 | 20 | 27 | 1st | QR2 | | | | | |
| 1945–46 | Allsvenskan | 22 | 7 | 2 | 13 | 42 | 64 | 16 | 10th | R1 | | | | Hans Stelius | 15 (Note: League goals) |
| 1946–47 | Allsvenskan | 22 | 8 | 4 | 10 | 40 | 46 | 20 | 9th | QF | | | | Nils Cederborg | 15 |
| 1947–48 | Allsvenskan | 22 | 6 | 5 | 11 | 32 | 35 | 17 | 11th | n/a | | | | Hans Stelius | 14 |
| 1948–49 | Div 2 Nordöstra | 18 | 17 | 1 | 0 | 64 | 16 | 35 | 1st | R2 | | | | | |
| 1949–50 | Allsvenskan | 22 | 8 | 2 | 12 | 34 | 39 | 18 | 8th | QF | | | | Hasse Jeppson | 18 |
| 1950–51 | Allsvenskan | 22 | 9 | 5 | 8 | 42 | 37 | 23 | 6th | RU | | | | Hasse Jeppson | 17 |
| 1951–52 | Allsvenskan | 22 | 10 | 3 | 9 | 39 | 42 | 23 | 7th | | | | | John Eriksson | 10 |
| 1952–53 | Allsvenskan | 22 | 11 | 4 | 7 | 41 | 34 | 26 | 3rd | n/a | | | | Hans Andersson-Tvilling | 11 |
| 1953–54 | Allsvenskan | 22 | 7 | 8 | 7 | 44 | 30 | 22 | 6th | | | | | Hans Andersson-Tvilling | 7 |
| 1954–55 | Allsvenskan | 22 | 14 | 5 | 3 | 53 | 27 | 33 | 1st | | | | | John Eriksson | 19 |
| 1955–56 | Allsvenskan | 22 | 12 | 3 | 7 | 49 | 38 | 27 | 3rd | | | | EC – QF | Sven Tumba | 14 |
| 1956–57 | Allsvenskan | 22 | 9 | 6 | 7 | 35 | 33 | 24 | 5th | | | | | Sven Tumba | 9 |
| 1957–58 | Allsvenskan | 33 | 16 | 10 | 7 | 69 | 48 | 42 | 3rd | | | | | John Eriksson | 15 |
| 1959 | Allsvenskan | 22 | 11 | 10 | 1 | 46 | 20 | 32 | 1st | | | | | Sven Tumba | 11 |
| 1960 | Allsvenskan | 22 | 8 | 2 | 12 | 26 | 38 | 18 | 11th | | | | | Leif Skiöld | 5 |
| 1961 | Div 2 Svealand | 22 | 17 | 2 | 3 | 77 | 21 | 36 | 1st | | | | | Leif Skiöld | 30 |
| 1962 | Allsvenskan | 22 | 11 | 8 | 3 | 51 | 19 | 30 | 2nd | | | | | Leif Skiöld | 21 |
| 1963 | Allsvenskan | 22 | 10 | 6 | 6 | 37 | 34 | 26 | 6th | | | | | Hans Nilsson | 10 |
| 1964 | Allsvenskan | 22 | 13 | 5 | 4 | 46 | 20 | 31 | 1st | | | | ICFC – R1 | Hans Nilsson | 15 |
| 1965 | Allsvenskan | 22 | 7 | 6 | 9 | 40 | 34 | 20 | 8th | | | | EC – R1 | Kay Wiestål | 13 |
| 1966 | Allsvenskan | 22 | 15 | 3 | 4 | 46 | 17 | 33 | 1st | | | | ICFC – R1 | Sven Lindman; Peder Persson | 12 |
| 1967 | Allsvenskan | 22 | 10 | 8 | 4 | 40 | 28 | 28 | 2nd | R4 | | | EC – R1 | Kay Wiestål | 10 |
| 1968 | Allsvenskan | 22 | 10 | 7 | 5 | 36 | 29 | 27 | 4th | | | | | Claes Cronqvist; Sven Lindman | 8 |
| 1969 | Allsvenskan | 22 | 12 | 3 | 7 | 39 | 26 | 27 | 3rd | QF | | | | Claes Cronqvist | 12 |
| 1970 | Allsvenskan | 22 | 8 | 8 | 6 | 35 | 29 | 24 | 3rd | R4 | | | | Dan Brzokoupil | 9 |
| 1971 | Allsvenskan | 22 | 11 | 4 | 7 | 32 | 27 | 26 | 4th | GS | | | UC – R1 | Dan Brzokoupil | 7 |
| 1972 | Allsvenskan | 22 | 8 | 5 | 9 | 41 | 39 | 21 | 7th | R4 | | | | Anders Ahlström | 10 |
| 1973 | Allsvenskan | 26 | 13 | 5 | 8 | 53 | 38 | 31 | 3rd | SF | | | | Harry Svensson | 16 |
| 1974 | Allsvenskan | 26 | 9 | 8 | 9 | 44 | 38 | 26 | 8th | SF | | | UC – R2 | Harry Svensson | 9 |
| 1975 | Allsvenskan | 26 | 13 | 8 | 5 | 36 | 25 | 34 | 3rd | RU | | | CWC – R1 | Harry Svensson | 11 |
| 1976 | Allsvenskan | 26 | 9 | 6 | 11 | 32 | 38 | 24 | 11th | SF | | | UC – R1 | Tommy Berggren; Kjell Karlsson; Håkan Stenbäck | 5 |
| 1977 | Allsvenskan | 26 | 7 | 10 | 9 | 34 | 37 | 24 | 10th | | | | | Anders Grönhagen | 7 |
| 1978 | Allsvenskan | 26 | 10 | 10 | 6 | 50 | 32 | 30 | 5th | R4 | | | | Tommy Berggren | 19 |
| 1979 | Allsvenskan | 26 | 7 | 8 | 11 | 28 | 35 | 22 | 10th | R3 | | | | Anders Grönhagen | 10 |
| 1980 | Allsvenskan | 26 | 7 | 7 | 12 | 24 | 37 | 21 | 12th | SF | | | | Anders Grönhagen; Hans Holmqvist | 5 |
| 1981 | Allsvenskan | 26 | 6 | 4 | 16 | 25 | 47 | 16 | 14th | R6 | | | | Tommy Berggren; Arne Erlandsen; Hans Holmqvist; Lasse Stenbäck | 3 |
| 1982 | Div 2 Norra | 22 | 13 | 4 | 5 | 50 | 23 | 30 | 1st | R6 | | | | Hans Holmqvist | 17 |
| 1983 | Div 2 Norra | 22 | 13 | 5 | 4 | 46 | 22 | 31 | 2nd | R3 | | | | Hans Holmqvist | 12 |
| 1984 | Div 2 Norra | 26 | 12 | 11 | 3 | 28 | 13 | 35 | 3rd | R6 | | | | Glenn Myrthil | 10 |
| 1985 | Div 2 Norra | 26 | 16 | 8 | 2 | 50 | 20 | 40 | 1st | R6 | | | | Glenn Myrthil | 14 |
| 1986 | Allsvenskan | 22 | 7 | 1 | 14 | 23 | 43 | 15 | 12th | R3 | | | | Stefan Rehn | 6 |
| 1987 | Div 1 Norra | 26 | 16 | 6 | 4 | 60 | 25 | 38 | 1st | R7 | | | | Stefan Rehn | 15 |
| 1988 | Allsvenskan | 22 | 9 | 9 | 4 | 38 | 22 | 27 | 3rd | R7 | | PO – RU | | Steve Galloway | 10 |
| 1989 | Allsvenskan | 22 | 9 | 5 | 8 | 23 | 24 | 23 | 6th | RU | | | CWC – R1 | Peter Skoog | 5 |
| 1990 | Allsvenskan | 22 | 9 | 6 | 7 | 37 | 23 | 33 (Note: The 1990 season saw the introduction of three points for a win) | 14th | W | | | CWC – R2 | Peter Skoog; Niklas Karlström | 8 |
| 1991 | Allsvenskan | 18 | 6 | 7 | 5 | 27 | 25 | 25 | 5th | R6 | | | | Krister Nordin | 6 |
| 1991 | Mästerskapsserien | 10 | 3 | 4 | 3 | 16 | 15 | 26 | 5th | R5 | | | | Krister Nordin | 6 |
| 1992 | Allsvenskan | 18 | 6 | 5 | 7 | 26 | 32 | 23 | 7th | | | | | Jens Fjellström | 7 |
| 1992 | Kvalsvenskan | 14 | 5 | 7 | 2 | 30 | 16 | 22 | 5th | | | | | Jens Fjellström | 7 |
| 1993 | Div 1 Norra | 26 | 13 | 7 | 6 | 58 | 31 | 46 | 3rd | R3 | | | | Nebojša Novaković | 19 |
| 1994 | Div 1 Norra | 26 | 19 | 4 | 3 | 71 | 27 | 61 | 1st | QF | | | | Bo Andersson | 24 |
| 1995 | Allsvenskan | 26 | 10 | 8 | 8 | 33 | 33 | 38 | 6th | QF | | | | Bo Andersson | 11 |
| 1996 | Allsvenskan | 26 | 8 | 3 | 15 | 28 | 43 | 27 | 13th | GS | | | IC – GS | Kaj Eskelinen | 15 |
| 1997 | Div 1 Norra | 26 | 17 | 6 | 3 | 65 | 30 | 57 | 2nd | R3 | | | | Fredrik Dahlström | 17 |
| 1998 | Div 1 Norra | 26 | 17 | 3 | 6 | 53 | 30 | 54 | 1st | SF | | | | Fredrik Dahlström | 16 |
| 1999 | Allsvenskan | 26 | 5 | 9 | 12 | 27 | 41 | 24 | 14th | R1 | | | | Sharbel Touma | 8 |
| 2000 | Superettan | 30 | 20 | 3 | 7 | 68 | 32 | 63 | 1st | R4 | | | | Samuel Wowoah | 15 |
| 2001 | Allsvenskan | 26 | 13 | 8 | 5 | 36 | 24 | 47 | 2nd | R5 | | | | Jones Kusi-Asare | 7 |
| 2002 | Allsvenskan | 26 | 16 | 4 | 6 | 51 | 33 | 52 | 1st | W | | | UC – R2 | Kim Källström | 17 |
| 2003 | Allsvenskan | 26 | 19 | 1 | 6 | 62 | 26 | 58 | 1st | SF | | | CL – QR2 | Andreas Johansson | 16 |
| 2004 | Allsvenskan | 26 | 11 | 8 | 7 | 38 | 32 | 41 | 4th | W | | RL – GS | CL – QR3 | Andreas Johansson | 18 |
| 2004 | Allsvenskan | 26 | 11 | 8 | 7 | 38 | 32 | 41 | 4th | W | | RL – GS | UC – R1 | Andreas Johansson | 18 |
| 2005 | Allsvenskan | 26 | 16 | 5 | 5 | 60 | 26 | 53 | 1st | W | | RL – SF | UC – QR2 | Jones Kusi-Asare | 15 |
| 2006 | Allsvenskan | 26 | 11 | 7 | 8 | 31 | 25 | 40 | 6th | R4 | | | CL – QR2 | Tobias Hysén | 11 |
| 2007 | Allsvenskan | 26 | 13 | 7 | 6 | 39 | 24 | 46 | 3rd | R3 | | | | Thiago Quirino | 8 |
| 2008 | Allsvenskan | 30 | 9 | 9 | 12 | 30 | 41 | 36 | 12th | R3 | | | UC – QR2 | Jones Kusi-Asare; Sebastian Rajalakso | 7 |
| 2009 | Allsvenskan | 30 | 8 | 5 | 17 | 24 | 49 | 29 | 14th | R4 | | | | Hrvoje Milić; Christer Youssef | 4 |
| 2010 | Allsvenskan | 30 | 11 | 7 | 12 | 35 | 42 | 40 | 10th | R3 | | | | Kennedy Igboananike | 9 |
| 2011 | Allsvenskan | 30 | 10 | 6 | 14 | 36 | 40 | 36 | 11th | R4 | | | | Kennedy Igboananike | 7 |
| 2012 | Allsvenskan | 30 | 8 | 13 | 9 | 37 | 40 | 37 | 11th | RU | | | | Erton Fejzullahu | 9 |
| 2013 | Allsvenskan | 30 | 12 | 8 | 10 | 38 | 44 | 44 | 7th | RU | | | | Amadou Jawo | 13 |
| 2014 | Allsvenskan | 30 | 11 | 10 | 9 | 47 | 33 | 43 | 7th | GS | | | | Erton Fejzullahu | 10 |
| 2015 | Allsvenskan | 30 | 14 | 9 | 7 | 52 | 37 | 51 | 6th | GS | | | | Nyasha Mushekwi | 12 |
| 2016 | Allsvenskan | 30 | 14 | 1 | 15 | 48 | 47 | 43 | 7th | GS | | | | Michael Olunga | 12 |
| 2017 | Allsvenskan | 30 | 15 | 8 | 7 | 54 | 30 | 53 | 3rd | GS | | | | Magnus Eriksson | 14 |
| 2018 | Allsvenskan | 30 | 13 | 9 | 8 | 40 | 31 | 48 | 7th | W | | | EL – QR2 | Tino Kadewere | 12 |
| 2019 | Allsvenskan | 30 | 20 | 6 | 4 | 53 | 19 | 66 | 1st | SF | | | | Mohamed Buya Turay | 16 |
| 2020 | Allsvenskan | 30 | 14 | 6 | 10 | 48 | 33 | 48 | 4th | GS | | | CL – QR1 | Fredrik Ulvestad | 13 |
| 2020 | Allsvenskan | 30 | 14 | 6 | 10 | 48 | 33 | 48 | 4th | GS | | | EL – QR3 | Fredrik Ulvestad | 13 |
| 2021 | Allsvenskan | 30 | 17 | 6 | 7 | 46 | 30 | 57 | 3rd | SF | | | | Edward Chilufya | 14 |
| 2022 | Allsvenskan | 30 | 17 | 6 | 7 | 55 | 25 | 57 | 2nd | SF | | | ECL – R16 | Victor Edvardsen | 15 |
| 2023 | Allsvenskan | 30 | 15 | 5 | 10 | 41 | 36 | 50 | 4th | SF | | | | | |
| 2023 | Allsvenskan | 30 | 15 | 5 | 10 | 41 | 36 | 50 | 4th | SF | | | ECL – 2QR | Marcus Danielson; Hampus Finndell | 6 |
| 2024 | Allsvenskan | 30 | 16 | 5 | 9 | 45 | 35 | 53 | 4th | GS | | | | | |
| 2024 | Allsvenskan | 30 | 16 | 5 | 9 | 45 | 35 | 53 | 4th | GS | | | ECL – SF | Deniz Hümmet | 24 |
| 2025 | Allsvenskan | 30 | 13 | 10 | 7 | 52 | 32 | 49 | 5th | GS | | | | | |
| 2025 | Allsvenskan | 30 | 13 | 10 | 7 | 52 | 32 | 49 | 5th | GS | | | | August Priske | 19 |

== Key ==
- P = Played
- W = Games won
- D = Games drawn
- L = Games lost
- F = Goals for
- A = Goals against
- Pts = Points
- Pos = Final position
- Div 1 = Division 1
- Div 2 = Division 2
- F = Final
- Group = Group stage
- QF = Quarter-finals
- QR1 = First Qualifying Round
- QR2 = Second Qualifying Round
- QR3 = Third Qualifying Round
- QR4 = Fourth Qualifying Round
- RInt = Intermediate Round
- R1 = Round 1
- R2 = Round 2
- R3 = Round 3
- R4 = Round 4
- R5 = Round 5
- R6 = Round 6
- SF = Semi-finals

| Champions | Runners-up | Promoted | Relegated |
