= List of Svenska Cupen finals =

The Swedish Football Association have organized a nationwide knock-out cup competition known as Svenska Cupen for 69 years, first between 1941 and 1953 and then again from 1967 to present day. There have been a few years in these two periods when cup competition has not been held. The present cup holders are Mjällby AIF, who beat Hammarby IF, in the 2026 final. It involves professional and amateur clubs of all standards playing against each other, creating the possibility for "minnows" to become "giant-killers" by eliminating top clubs from the tournament. 13 teams have reached the final while playing in a lower division, however two of these reached the final unhindered during the 1948 tournament when no first tier teams competed. All of the second tier teams have lost in the final except for Råå IF in 1948 and Degerfors IF in 1992–93, both of whom faced second tier opposition.

Malmö FF have a record 16 cup titles, followed by AIK and IFK Göteborg who has eight titles each. Malmö FF is also the club who have won most consecutive titles and the record of appearing in the most finals, they won three consecutive titles between 1973 and 1975 and having appeared in 23 finals. AIK have finished as runners-up for a record of eight times. Örebro SK are the team to have appeared in the most finals without winning the cup title, they have appeared and lost in two finals, their latest final was in 2015.

== Winners ==
Key
^{†}	Winners also won the Swedish championship during the same season
^{‡}	Team was playing outside the top division of the national league
(aet)	After extra time
(pen.)	Penalty shoot-out
(number of cup wins)	A running tally of the total number of cup titles won by each club is kept in brackets.

=== 1941–1953 ===
Season	Winners	Result	Runners-up	Venue	Attendance
1941	Hälsingborgs IF (1)^{†}	3–1	IK Sleipner	Råsunda	10,763
1942	GAIS (1)	2–1	IF Elfsborg	Råsunda	10,013
1943	IFK Norrköping (1)^{†}	0–0; Replay: 5–2	AIK	Råsunda; Idrottsparken	22,478; 19,595
1944	Malmö FF (1)^{†}	4–3 (aet)	IFK Norrköping	Råsunda	35,087
1945	IFK Norrköping (2)^{†}	4–1	Malmö FF	Råsunda	31,896
1946	Malmö FF (2)	3–0	Åtvidabergs FF^{†}	Råsunda	15,173
1947	Malmö FF (3)	3–2	AIK	Råsunda	26,705
1948	Råå IF (1)^{‡}	6–0	BK Kenty^{‡}	Olympia	9,852
1949	AIK (1)	1–0	Landskrona BoIS	Råsunda	14,718
1950	AIK (2)	3–2	Hälsingborgs IF	Råsunda	15,154
1951	Malmö FF (4)^{†}	2–1	Djurgårdens IF	Råsunda	20,267
1952	–	Not held	–	–	–
1953	Malmö FF (5)^{†}	3–2	IFK Norrköping	Råsunda	20,339

=== 1967–Present ===
Season	Winners	Result	Runners-up	Venue	Attendance
1967	Malmö FF (6)^{†}	2–0	IFK Norrköping	Idrottsparken	11,707
1968	–	Not held	–	–	–
1968–69	IFK Norrköping (3)	1–0	AIK	Råsunda	7,832
1969–70	Åtvidabergs FF (1)	2–0	Sandvikens IF^{‡}	Studenternas IP	3,110
1970–71	Åtvidabergs FF (2)	3–2	Malmö FF	Malmö Stadion	7,544
1971–72	Landskrona BoIS (1)	0–0 (aet); Replay: 3–2	IFK Norrköping	Idrottsparken; Landskrona IP	2,111; 9,686
1972–73	Malmö FF (7)	7–0	Åtvidabergs FF	Stadsparksvallen	6,016
1973–74	Malmö FF (8)^{†}	2–0	Östers IF	Örjans Vall	4,227
1974–75	Malmö FF (9)^{†}	1–0	Djurgårdens IF	Malmö Stadion	6,913
1975–76	AIK (3)	Match 1: 1–1; Match 2: 3–0	Landskrona BoIS	Landskrona IP; Råsunda	3,340; 1,715
1976–77	Östers IF (1)	1–0	Hammarby IF	Söderstadion	7,818
1977–78	Malmö FF (10)	2–0 (aet)	Kalmar FF	Strandängen	4,813
1978–79	IFK Göteborg (1)	6–1	Åtvidabergs FF	Råsunda	9,457
1979–80	Malmö FF (11)	5–5 (aet); 4–3 (pen.)	IK Brage^{‡}	Råsunda	6,172
1980–81	Kalmar FF (1)	4–0	IF Elfsborg	Råsunda	2,245
1981–82	IFK Göteborg (2)^{†}	3–2	Östers IF	Råsunda	13,859
1982–83	IFK Göteborg (3)^{†}	1–0	Hammarby IF	Råsunda	13,245
1983–84	Malmö FF (12)	1–0	Landskrona BoIS	Olympia	7,810
1984–85	AIK (4)	1–1 (aet); 3–2 (pen.)	Östers IF	Råsunda	4,888
1985–86	Malmö FF (13)^{†}	2–1	IFK Göteborg	Råsunda	11,656
1986–87	Kalmar FF (2)	2–0	GAIS^{‡}	Råsunda	8,740
1987–88	IFK Norrköping (4)	3–1	Örebro SK^{‡}	Råsunda	5,046
1988–89	Malmö FF (14)	3–0	Djurgårdens IF	Råsunda	7,526
1989–90	Djurgårdens IF (1)	3–0	BK Häcken^{‡}	Råsunda	3,357
1990–91	IFK Norrköping (5)	4–1	Östers IF	Råsunda	1,858
1991	IFK Göteborg (4)^{†}	3–2 (aet)	AIK	Råsunda	2,151
1991–92	–	Not held	–	–	–
1992–93	Degerfors IF (1)^{‡}	3–0	Landskrona BoIS^{‡}	Ullevi	5,078
1993–94	IFK Norrköping (6)	4–3 (aet)	Helsingborgs IF	Ullevi	4,021
1994–95	Halmstads BK (1)	3–1	AIK	Ullevi	4,889
1995–96	AIK (5)	1–0 (aet)	Malmö FF	Ullevi	2,745
1996–97	AIK (6)	2–1	IF Elfsborg^{‡}	Ryavallen	9,547
1997–98	Helsingborgs IF (2)	Match 1: 1–1; Match 2: 1–1; 3–0 (pen.)	Örgryte IS	Ullevi; Olympia	2,559; 13,092
1998–99	AIK (7)	Match 1: 1–0; Match 2: 0–0	IFK Göteborg	Råsunda; Ullevi	9,171; 13,853
1999–2000	Örgryte IS (1)	Match 1: 2–0; Match 2: 0–1	AIK	Råsunda; Ullevi	7,771; 5,013
2000–01	IF Elfsborg (1)	1–1 (aet); 9–8 (pen.)	AIK	Stadsparksvallen	6,634
2002	Djurgårdens IF (2)^{†}	1–0 (aet)	AIK	Råsunda	33,727
2003	IF Elfsborg (2)	2–0	Assyriska FF^{‡}	Råsunda	10,280
2004	Djurgårdens IF (3)	3–1	IFK Göteborg	Råsunda	9,417
2005	Djurgårdens IF (4)^{†}	2–0	Åtvidabergs FF^{‡}	Råsunda	11,613
2006	Helsingborgs IF (3)	2–0	Gefle IF	Råsunda	3,379
2007	Kalmar FF (3)	3–0	IFK Göteborg	Fredriksskans	6,877
2008	IFK Göteborg (5)	0–0 (aet); 5–4 (pen.)	Kalmar FF	Fredriksskans	7,158
2009	AIK (8)^{†}	2–0	IFK Göteborg	Råsunda	24,365
2010	Helsingborgs IF (4)	1–0	Hammarby IF^{‡}	Söderstadion	12,357
2011	Helsingborgs IF (5)^{†}	3–1	Kalmar FF	Olympia	9,513
2012	–	Not held	–	–	–
2012–13	IFK Göteborg (6)	1–1 (aet); 3–1 (pen.)	Djurgårdens IF	Nationalarenan	21,819
2013–14	IF Elfsborg (3)	1–0	Helsingborgs IF	Nationalarenan	3,423
2014–15	IFK Göteborg (7)	2–1	Örebro SK	Gamla Ullevi	16,761
2015–16	BK Häcken (1)	2–2 (aet); 6–5 (pen.)	Malmö FF	Swedbank Stadion	22,302
2016–17	Östersunds FK (1)	4–1	IFK Norrköping	Jämtkraft Arena	8,369
2017–18	Djurgårdens IF (5)	3–0	Malmö FF	Tele2 Arena	25,123
2018–19	BK Häcken (2)	3–0	AFC Eskilstuna	Bravida Arena	4,958
2019–20	IFK Göteborg (8)	2–1 (aet)	Malmö FF	Gamla Ullevi	0
2020–21	Hammarby IF (1)	0–0 (aet); 5–4 (pen.)	BK Häcken	Tele2 Arena	0
2021–22	Malmö FF (15)^{†}	0–0 (aet); 4–3 (pen.)	Hammarby IF	Tele2 Arena	25,567
2022–23	BK Häcken (3)^{†}	4–1	Mjällby AIF	Strandvallen	5,832
2023–24	Malmö FF (16)^{†}	1–1 (aet); 4–1 (pen.)	Djurgårdens IF	Eleda Stadion	17,264
2024–25	BK Häcken (4)	0–0 (aet); 4–2 (pen.)	Malmö FF	Eleda Stadion	20,189
2025–26	Mjällby AIF (1)^{†}	2–1	Hammarby IF	Nationalarenan	39,903

== Performances ==
=== Performance by club ===
Cup titles won by club (%)
1. Malmö FF – 16 (23.0%)
2. AIK – 8 (12.0%)
3. IFK Göteborg – 8 (12.0%)
4. IFK Norrköping – 6 (9.00%)
5. Helsingborgs IF – 5 (7.00%)
6. Djurgårdens IF – 5 (7.00%)
7. BK Häcken – 4 (6.00%)
8. IF Elfsborg – 3 (4.00%)
9. Kalmar FF – 3 (4.00%)
10. Other clubs – 12 (17.0%)

20 clubs have won Svenska Cupen. 24 clubs have been runners-up, and of these eight clubs are yet to win a cup final. Four of the 20 cup-winning clubs have never lost the competition's deciding game, but none of these have played in more than one final.

Total cup wins by club
Club	Winners	Runners-up	Cup-winning years	Years as runners-up
Malmö FF	16	7	1944, 1946, 1947, 1951, 1953, 1967, 1972–73, 1973–74, 1974–75, 1977–78, 1979–80, 1983–84, 1985–86, 1988–89, 2021–22, 2023–24	1945, 1970–71, 1995–96, 2015–16, 2017–18, 2019–20, 2024–25
AIK	8	8	1949, 1950, 1975–76, 1984–85, 1995–96, 1996–97, 1998–99, 2009	1943, 1947, 1968–69, 1991, 1994–95, 1999–2000, 2000–01, 2002
IFK Göteborg	8	5	1978–79, 1981–82, 1982–83, 1991, 2008, 2012–13, 2014–15, 2019–20	1985–86, 1998–99, 2004, 2007, 2009
IFK Norrköping	6	5	1943, 1945, 1968–69, 1987–88, 1990–91, 1993–94	1944, 1953, 1967, 1971–72, 2016–17
Djurgårdens IF	5	5	1989–90, 2002, 2004, 2005, 2017–18	1951, 1974–75, 1988–89, 2012–13, 2023–24
Helsingborgs IF	5	3	1941, 1997–98, 2006, 2010, 2011	1950, 1993–94, 2013–14
BK Häcken	4	2	2015–16, 2018–19, 2022–23, 2024–25	1989–90, 2020–21
Kalmar FF	3	3	1980–81, 1986–87, 2007	1977–78, 2008, 2011
IF Elfsborg	3	3	2000–01, 2003, 2013–14	1942, 1980–81, 1996–97
Åtvidabergs FF	2	4	1969–70, 1970–71	1946, 1972–73, 1978–79, 2005
Landskrona BoIS	1	4	1971–72	1949, 1975–76, 1983–84, 1992–93
Östers IF	1	4	1976–77	1973–74, 1981–82, 1984–85, 1990–91
Hammarby IF	1	5	2020–21	1976–77, 1982–83, 2010, 2021–22, 2025–26
GAIS	1	1	1942	1986–87
Örgryte IS	1	1	1999–2000	1997–98
Mjällby AIF	1	1	2025–26	2022–23
Råå IF	1	–	1948	–
Degerfors IF	1	–	1992–93	–
Halmstads BK	1	–	1994–95	–
Östersunds FK	1	–	2016–17	–
Örebro SK	–	2	–	1987–88, 2014–15
IK Sleipner	–	1	–	1941
BK Kenty	–	1	–	1948
Sandvikens IF	–	1	–	1969–70
IK Brage	–	1	–	1979–80
Assyriska FF	–	1	–	2003
Gefle IF	–	1	–	2006
AFC Eskilstuna	–	1	–	2018–19

=== Total cup wins by city ===
The 20 title-winning clubs have come from a total of 14 cities. The most successful cities are Malmö and Stockholm. All of Malmö's titles have been won by Malmö FF, while AIK, Djurgårdens IF and Hammarby IF have won the title from Stockholm.

Total cup wins by city
City	Won	Clubs
Malmö	16	Malmö FF (16)
Gothenburg	14	IFK Göteborg (8), BK Häcken (4), GAIS (1), Örgryte IS (1)
Stockholm	14	AIK (8), Djurgårdens IF (5), Hammarby IF (1)
Helsingborg	6	Helsingborgs IF (5), Råå IF (1)
Norrköping	6	IFK Norrköping (6)
Borås	3	IF Elfsborg (3)
Kalmar	3	Kalmar FF (3)
Åtvidaberg	2	Åtvidabergs FF (2)
Degerfors	1	Degerfors IF (1)
Halmstad	1	Halmstads BK (1)
Hällevik	1	Mjällby AIF (1)
Landskrona	1	Landskrona BoIS (1)
Växjö	1	Östers IF (1)
Östersund	1	Östersunds FK (1)

=== Total cup wins by county ===
There have been 20 winners of Svenska Cupen, from ten counties. The most successful county is Skåne with 23 titles divided between four clubs.

Total cup wins by province
County	Won	Clubs
Skåne	23	Malmö FF (16), Helsingborgs IF (5), Råå IF (1), Landskrona BoIS (1)
Västra Götaland	17	IFK Göteborg (8), BK Häcken (4), IF Elfsborg (3), GAIS (1), Örgryte IS (1)
Stockholm	14	AIK (8), Djurgårdens IF (5), Hammarby IF (1)
Östergötland	8	IFK Norrköping (6), Åtvidabergs FF (2)
Kalmar	3	Kalmar FF (3)
Blekinge	1	Mjällby AIF (1)
Halland	1	Halmstads BK (1)
Jämtland	1	Östersunds FK (1)
Kronoberg	1	Östers IF (1)
Örebro	1	Degerfors IF (1)
