= 1947 Svenska Cupen final =

- Event: 1947 Svenska Cupen
Malmö FF	AIK
3	2
- Date: 24 August 1947
- Venue: Råsunda, Solna
- Referee: Erik Jansson (Kvarnsveden)
- Attendance: 26,705

The 1947 Svenska Cupen final took place on 24 August 1947 at Råsunda in Solna. It was contested between Allsvenskan sides Malmö FF and AIK. AIK played their first final since 1943 and their second final in total, Malmö FF played their fourth consecutive final and their fourth final in total. Malmö FF won their third title with a 3–2 victory.

== Match details ==
24 August 1947

Malmö FF	3–2	AIK
Tapper 58' (pen.), 75'; Nilsson 82'		Carlsson 16'; Nilsson 79'

Råsunda, Solna
Attendance: 26,705
Referee: Erik Jansson (Kvarnsveden)

Malmö FF	AIK

MALMÖ FF:
GK	(Sweden) Sven Winqvist
DF	(Sweden) Hans Malmström
DF	(Sweden) Erik Nilsson
DF	(Sweden) Kjell Rosén
DF	(Sweden) Sture Mårtensson
MF	(Sweden) Ingvar Gärd
MF	(Sweden) Egon Jönsson
MF	(Sweden) Börje Tapper
MF	(Sweden) Gustaf Nilsson
FW	(Sweden) Walfrid Ek
FW	(Sweden) Stellan Nilsson
Manager:
(Hungary) Kálmán Konrád

AIK:
GK	(Sweden) Gustav Sjöberg
DF	(Sweden) Lennart Askinger
DF	(Sweden) Ove Karlsson
DF	(Sweden) Bengt Rosenqvist
DF	(Sweden) Harry Nilsson
MF	(Sweden) Harry Johansson
MF	(Sweden) Gösta Nilsson
MF	(Sweden) Lennart Pettersson
MF	(Sweden) Sune Andersson
FW	(Sweden) Henry Carlsson
FW	(Sweden) Bertil Bäckvall
Manager:
(Hungary) István Wampetits
