= Bertil Bäckvall =

Swedish footballer and manager

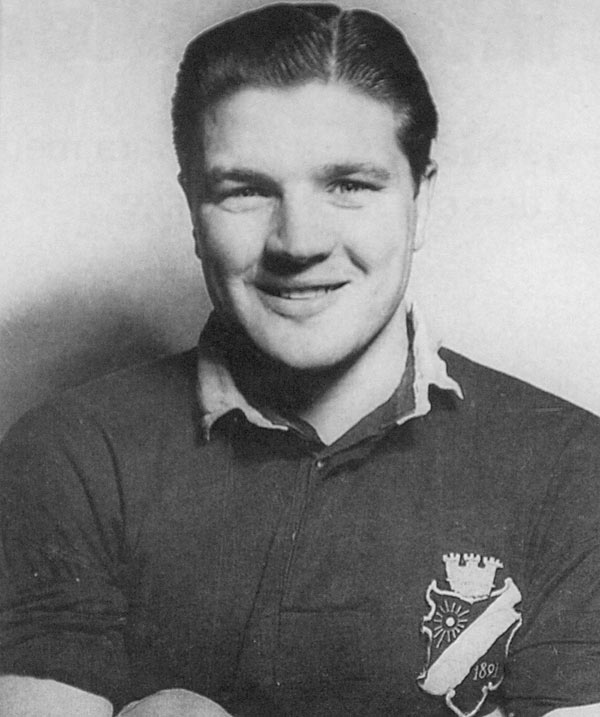
- Bäckvall with AIK.

Personal information
- Full name: Bertil Konrad Bäckvall
- Date of birth: 22 February 1923
- Place of birth: Stockholm, Sweden
- Date of death: 28 October 2012 (aged 89)
- Place of death: Trelleborg, Sweden
- Position: Left winger

Youth career
- 1934–1939: Sandsborgs IF

Senior career*
Years	Team	Apps	(Gls)
1939–1946	Hammarby IF	99	(48)
1946–1953	AIK	133	(40)
1954–1955	Hagalunds IS		
1958–1959	Östers IF		

International career
1948	Sweden B	1	(0)
1945–1949	Sweden	2	(0)

Managerial career
- 1954–1955: Hagalunds IS
- 1956–1958: AIK (Youth teams)
- 1958–1963: Östers IF
- 1963–1966: Kalmar FF
- 1967–1969: IK Brage
- 1970–1971: Krylbo IF
- * Club domestic league appearances and goals

Bertil Bäckvall (22 February 1923 – 28 October 2012) was a Swedish footballer and manager. He mostly represented Hammarby IF and AIK, and won two caps for the Sweden national team.

== Playing career ==
=== Hammarby IF ===
Born and raised in Stockholm, Bäckvall started to play football with local club Sandsborgs IF as a youngster. In 1939, he made his debut for Hammarby IF in Allsvenskan, Sweden's first tier. Bäckvall played four league games throughout the season, as Hammarby suffered a relegation, and scored a brace in a 7–1 home win against Gårda BK on 2 June 1940, making him one of the youngest ever goalscorers in Allsvenskan, at age 17.

Back in Division 2, the Swedish second tier, Hammarby IF finished in the top four for the next six years. Bäckvall established himself as one of his side's offensive key players, together with Holger Nurmela and Kurt Kjellström. He had his major breakthrough in 1942, playing 18 games and scoring eight goals, as his side placed second behind IK Brage on goal difference, barely missing out on the play-off spot.

In 1943, Bäckvall spent a few months with rival club AIK, but the transfer ultimately fell through. Bäckvall made his debut for the Sweden national team on 26 August 1945, whilst still playing in the domestic second division, in a 7–2 friendly win against Finland national football team.

He left Hammarby in the summer of 1946, being replaced as a left winger by the future club legend Lennart Skoglund, who would become one of the most renowned Swedish players.

=== AIK ===
In 1946, Bäckvall completed a transfer to AIK in Allsvenskan. He made his competitive debut for the club on 8 September the same year, in a 2–1 home win against Degerfors IF. He became a frequent starter, getting known for his pace and fine scoring efficiency. Other key players in this era included Börje Leander, Sune Andersson and Henry Carlsson.

AIK finished in the top four for the next four Allsvenskan seasons, but failed to win the Swedish championship title. Although, he won Svenska Cupen, the biggest domestic cup, in both 1949 and 1950 with the club. On 13 May 1949, Bäckvall won his second and final cap for Sweden, in an impressive 3–1 win against England.

In 1950–51, the club suffered a relegation from the top division for the first time in its history, but Bäckvall decided to stay with AIK and won an immediate promotion the next season.

He decided to retire from top-level football in 1953, after seven full seasons with the club, due to an injured achilles tendon. In total, Bäckvall played 133 league games for AIK and scored 40 goals.

== Managerial career ==
In 1954, Bäckvall became the player-coach of local Stockholm club Hagalunds IS in the lower divisions, where he stayed for one season. He later worked as a coach in AIK's youth organisation.

Bäckvall was recruited by Östers IF in 1958. He was a player-coach during his first two seasons in charge, making a comeback to the pitch after three years, before working as a full time manager. During his tenure, the club was promoted from the third level Division 3 to the second level Division 2. He is credited with implementing a sense of work ethic and professionalism in the club, but left in 1963.

He later worked as a coach for Kalmar FF and IK Brage in Division 2.

== Honours ==
=== Club ===
AIK

- Svenska Cupen: 1949, 1950
