= Sune Andersson (footballer, born 1921) =

Swedish footballer and manager

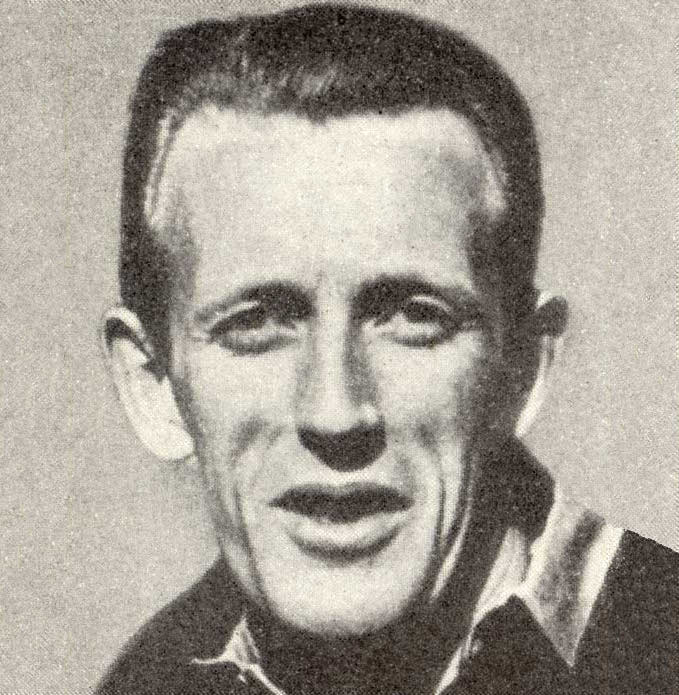
- Andersson c. 1960

Personal information
- Date of birth: 22 February 1921
- Place of birth: Södertälje, Sweden
- Date of death: 29 April 2002 (aged 81)
- Place of death: Solna, Sweden
- Position: Midfielder

Youth career
- 1934–1939: Ekerö IK

Senior career*
Years	Team	Apps	(Gls)
1939–1946	Hagalunds IS		
1946–1950	AIK	82	(18)
1950–1952	A.S. Roma	59	(12)
1956–1958	IFK Eskilstuna		
1959–1961	Kalmar FF		
1962–1963	Finspångs AIK		
1964–1967	Södertälje SK		
1968–1971	Hagalunds IS		

International career
1947–1950	Sweden	28	(4)

Managerial career
- 1953–1955: Iggesunds IK
- 1956–1958: IFK Eskilstuna
- 1959–1961: Kalmar FF
- 1962–1963: Finspångs AIK
- 1964–1967: Södertälje SK
- 1968–1971: Hagalunds IS
Medal record
Representing Sweden
Olympic Games
Gold medal – first place	1948 London
FIFA World Cup
Third place	1950 Brazil
- * Club domestic league appearances and goals

Sune Isidor "Mona-Lisa" Andersson (22 February 1921 – 29 April 2002) was a Swedish football player and manager. He is best remembered for representing AIK and A.S. Roma during his club career. A full international between 1947 and 1950, he won 28 caps and scored four goals for the Sweden national team. He was on the Sweden teams that won gold at the 1948 Summer Olympics and finished third at the 1950 FIFA World Cup.

== Club career ==
Andersason was a versatile midfielder, who would take any position: left, right or center. His only domestic title was the 1949 Svenska Cupen with AIK. His performance at the 1950 World Cup earned him a transfer to A.S. Roma in Serie A, where he played for two seasons and scored 12 goals. He then continued playing and coaching in Sweden until 1971.

== International career ==
Andersson played 28 times for the Swedish national team, scoring four goals, and won a gold medal at the 1948 Summer Olympics, and a bronze at the 1950 FIFA World Cup.

== Personal life ==
Andersson was nicknamed "Mona-Lisa", because of his blunt facial expression while playing. He was also an elite bowler.

== Career statistics ==
=== International ===
Appearances and goals by national team and year
National team	Year	Apps	Goals
Sweden	1947	6	1
Sweden	1948	9	0
Sweden	1949	7	1
Sweden	1950	6	2
Total		28	4

Scores and results list Sweden's goal tally first, score column indicates score after each Andersson goal.

List of international goals scored by Sune Andersson
No.	Date	Venue	Opponent	Score	Result	Competition	Ref.
1	26 June 1947	Råsunda Stadium, Solna, Sweden	Denmark	2–0	6–1	Friendly	
2	2 June 1949	Råsunda Stadium, Solna, Sweden	Republic of Ireland	1–1	3–1	1950 FIFA World Cup qualification	
3	25 June 1950	Pacaembu Stadium, São Paulo, Brazil	Italy	2–1	3–2	1950 FIFA World Cup	
4	9 July 1950	Maracanã Stadium, Rio de Janeiro, Brazil	Brazil	1–5	1–7	1950 FIFA World Cup	

== Honours ==
AIK

- Svenska Cupen: 1949

Sweden

- Summer Olympics: 1948
- FIFA World Cup third place: 1950
