= Gustaf VI Adolfs Pokal =

- Awarded for: Winning Svenska Cupen
- Presented by: Swedish Football Association
- First award: 1967
- Currently held by: Malmö FF
- Website: svenskfotboll.se

Gustaf VI Adolfs Pokal is a trophy awarded annually by the Swedish Football Association to the football club that wins Svenska Cupen, Sweden's premier football cup. The trophy was first introduced in 1967 to celebrate the reintroduction of Svenska Cupen after a break since 1953. The trophy was awarded until 1983 when Svenska Cupen was rebranded as Skandiacupen. Two different trophies were used between 1984 and 2001, Skandiacupen and SvFFs Pokal. Gustaf VI Adolfs Pokal was reintroduced as the cup trophy in 2002 and has been awarded annually since then. The first club to lift the trophy was Malmö FF in 1967 and are the current holders having won the Svenska Cupen in 2022 over Hammarby the winners in 2021. IFK Göteborg is the clubs to lift the trophy the most times, having lifted it seven times.

== The trophy ==
The trophy is made of silver and has a small football mounted on its top. The trophy is designed like a torso with a broad base and a broad top connected with a slightly more narrow body. The trophy was designed and created by jewelers Bo and Peter Fahlström. The trophy is named after Gustaf VI Adolf of Sweden, king of Sweden between 1950 and 1973.

== Trophy winners ==
Season	Winner
1967	Malmö FF (1)
1968–69	IFK Norrköping (1)
1969–70	Åtvidabergs FF (1)
1970–71	Åtvidabergs FF (2)
1971–72	Landskrona BoIS (1)
1972–73	Malmö FF (2)
1973–74	Malmö FF (3)
1974–75	Malmö FF (4)
1975–76	AIK (1)
1976–77	Östers IF (1)
1977–78	Malmö FF (5)
1978–79	IFK Göteborg (1)
1979–80	Malmö FF (6)
1980–81	Kalmar FF (1)
1981–82	IFK Göteborg (2)
1982–83	IFK Göteborg (3)

Season	Winner
2002	Djurgårdens IF (1)
2003	IF Elfsborg (1)
2004	Djurgårdens IF (2)
2005	Djurgårdens IF (3)
2006	Helsingborgs IF (1)
2007	Kalmar FF (2)
2008	IFK Göteborg (4)
2009	AIK (2)
2010	Helsingborgs IF (2)
2011	Helsingborgs IF (3)
2013	IFK Göteborg (5)
2014	IF Elfsborg (2)
2015	IFK Göteborg (6)
2016	BK Häcken (1)
2017	Östersunds FK (1)
2018	Djurgårdens IF (4)

Season	Winner
2019	BK Häcken (2)
2020	IFK Göteborg (7)
2021	Hammarby IF (1)

== Trophy champions ==
Titles	Team
7	IFK Göteborg
6	Malmö FF
3	Djurgårdens IF
3	Helsingborgs IF
2	AIK
2	Kalmar FF
2	Åtvidabergs FF
2	IF Elfsborg
2	BK Häcken
1	Östers IF
1	Landskrona BoIS
1	IFK Norrköping
1	Östersunds FK
1	Hammarby IF
