= 1948 Svenska Cupen =

Tournament details
- Country: Sweden
- Teams: 56

Final positions
- Champions: Råå IF
- Runners-up: BK Kenty

Tournament statistics
- Matches played: 55

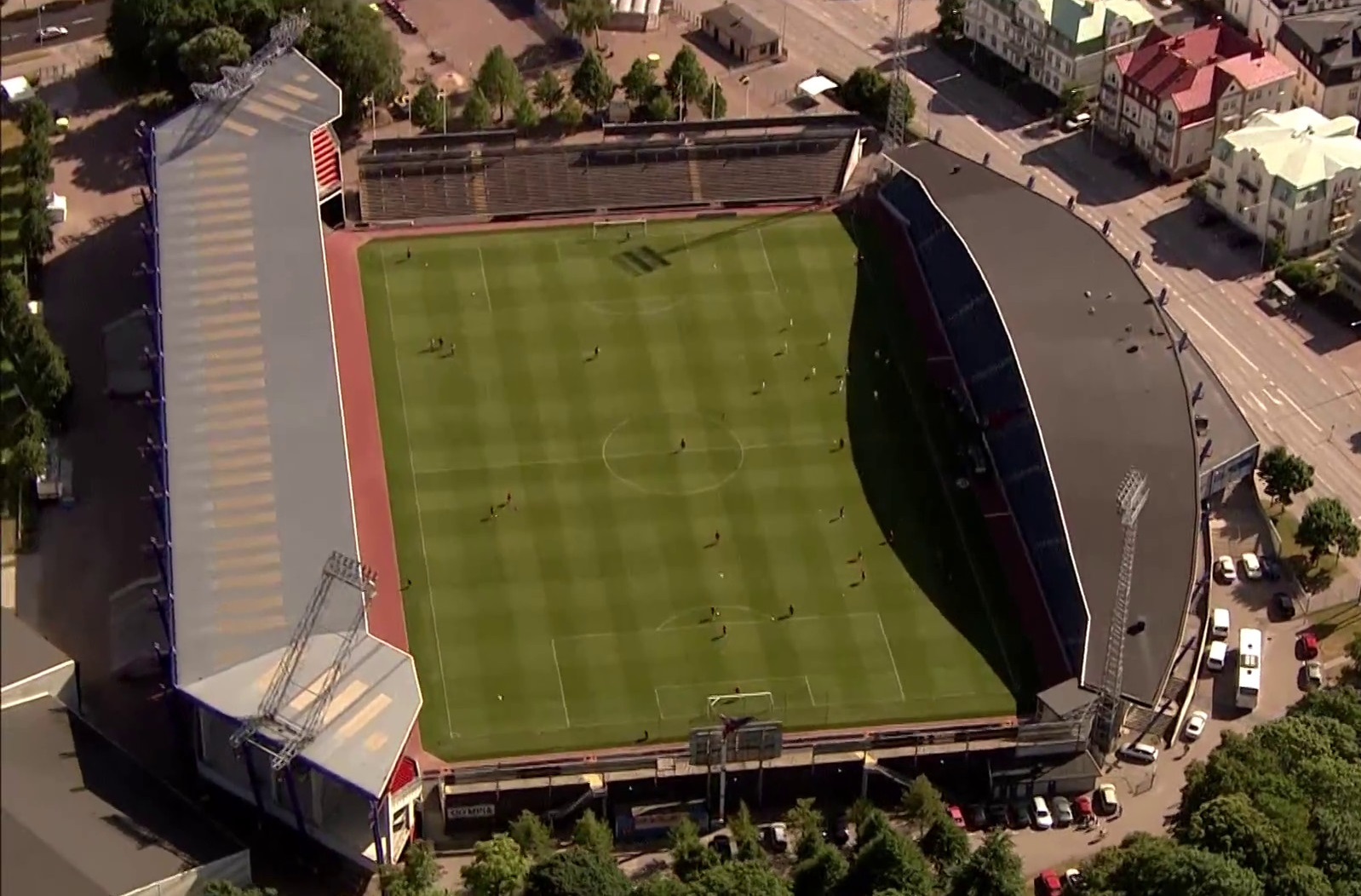
Football stadium in Helsingborg

The 1948 Svenska Cupen was the eighth season of the main Swedish football Cup and for the first time was not competed for by Allsvenskan clubs, because of the Summer Olympics in London. The final was between two third division clubs and was held on 25 July 1948 at Olympia, Helsingborg. Råå IF won 6–0 against BK Kenty before an attendance of 9,852 spectators.

== Preliminary round 1 ==
Tie no	Home team	Score	Away team	Attendance
1	BK Kenty (D3)	5–2	Olofströms IF (D3)	1,725
2	Råå IF (D3)	5–0	Huskvarna Södra IS (D3)	1,217

For other results see SFS-Bolletinen - Matcher i Svenska Cupen.

== Preliminary round 2 ==
Tie no	Home team	Score	Away team	Attendance
1	Skene IF (D4)	2–3	Råå IF (D3)	1,424
2	Södertälje SK (D4)	3–4 (aet)	BK Kenty (D3)	

For other results see SFS-Bolletinen - Matcher i Svenska Cupen.

== First round ==
Tie no	Home team	Score	Away team	Attendance
1	BK Kenty (D3)	3–1	Fagerviks GF (D3)	1,851
2	Råå IF (D3)	2–1	Landskrona BoIS (D2)	5,399

For other results see SFS-Bolletinen - Matcher i Svenska Cupen.

== Second round ==
The 8 matches in this round were played on 4 July 1948.

Tie no	Home team	Score	Away team	Attendance
1	IFK Västerås (D2)	3–2	IK Sleipner (D2)	875
2	Kramfors IF (N)	2–4 (aet)	BK Kenty (D3)	2,808
3	Reymersholms IK (D2)	5–2	Åtvidabergs FF (D2)	1,504
4	Wifsta/Östrands IF (N)	4–3	Ludvika FfI (D2)	974
5	Råå IF (D3)	3–2	Sandvikens IF (D3)	2,116
6	Sandvikens AIK (D2)	2–3 (aet)	Tidaholms GIF (D2)	822
7	Karlstads BIK (D2)	2–5	IF Friska Viljor (N)	1,550
8	Sandviks IK (N)	2–3	Surahammars IF (D2)	

== Quarter-finals ==
The 4 matches in this round were played on 11 July 1948.

Tie no	Home team	Score	Away team	Attendance
1	Surahammars IF (D2)	2–5	Råå IF (D3)	1,124
2	Tidaholms GIF (D2)	8–4 (aet)	Wifsta/Östrands IF (N)	800
3	BK Kenty (D3)	4–0	Reymersholms IK (D2)	1,966
4	IF Friska Viljor (N)	3–2	IFK Västerås (D2)	1,700

== Semi-finals ==
The semi-finals in this round were played on 18 July 1948.

Tie no	Home team	Score	Away team	Attendance
1	BK Kenty (D3)	1–0	Tidaholms GIF (D2)	2,466
2	Råå IF (D3)	9–1	IF Friska Viljor (N)	7,336

== Final ==
The final was played on 25 July 1948 at the Olympia Stadium.

Tie no	Team 1	Score	Team 2	Attendance
1	Råå IF (D3)	6–0	BK Kenty (D3)	9,852
