= Valbo FF =

- Full name: Valbo Fotbollförening
- Founded: 1980
- Ground: Åbyvallen; Valbo; Sweden
- Chairman: Fredrik Thorgren
- Coach: Fredrik Boström
- League: Division 4 Gästrikland
Home colours	Away colours

Valbo FF is a Swedish football club located in Valbo.

== Background ==
Valbo FF currently plays in Division 4 Gästrikland. They play their home matches at the Åbyvallen in Valbo.

The club is affiliated to Gestriklands Fotbollförbund. Valbo FF have competed in the Svenska Cupen on 18 occasions and have played 44 matches in the competition.

== Season to season ==
In their most successful period Valbo FF competed in the following divisions:

Season	Level	Division	Section	Position	Movements
1981	Tier 4	Division 4	Gästrikland	5th	
1982	Tier 4	Division 4	Gästrikland	2nd	
1983	Tier 4	Division 4	Gästrikland	2nd	
1984	Tier 4	Division 4	Gästrikland	7th	
1985	Tier 4	Division 4	Gästrikland	4th	
1986	Tier 4	Division 4	Gästrikland	2nd	Promoted
1987*	Tier 4	Division 3	Södra Norrland	7th	
1988	Tier 4	Division 3	Södra Norrland	2nd	
1989	Tier 4	Division 3	Södra Norrland	4th	
1990	Tier 4	Division 3	Södra Norrland	4th	Relegated

* League restructuring in 1987 resulted in a new division being created at Tier 2 and subsequent divisions dropping a level.

In recent seasons Valbo FF have competed in the following divisions:

Season	Level	Division	Section	Position	Movements
1999	Tier 5	Division 4	Gästrikland	10th	
2000	Tier 5	Division 4	Gästrikland	9th	
2001	Tier 5	Division 4	Gästrikland	7th	
2002	Tier 5	Division 4	Gästrikland	4th	
2003	Tier 5	Division 4	Gästrikland	5th	
2004	Tier 5	Division 4	Gästrikland	2nd	Promotion playoffs
2005	Tier 5	Division 4	Gästrikland	1st	Promoted
2006*	Tier 5	Division 3	Södra Norrland	3rd	
2007	Tier 5	Division 3	Södra Norrland	2nd	Promotion playoffs
2008	Tier 5	Division 3	Södra Norrland	8th	
2009	Tier 5	Division 3	Södra Norrland	5th	
2010	Tier 5	Division 3	Södra Norrland	12th	Relegated
2011	Tier 6	Division 4	Gästrikland	3rd	

* League restructuring in 2006 resulted in a new division being created at Tier 3 and subsequent divisions dropping a level.
