= 1951 Svenska Cupen =

Tournament details
- Country: Sweden
- Teams: 32

Final positions
- Champions: Malmö FF
- Runners-up: Djurgårdens IF

Tournament statistics
- Matches played: 31

The 1951 Svenska Cupen was the 11th season of the main Swedish football Cup. The competition was concluded on 22 July 1951 with the final, held at Råsunda Stadium, Solna in Stockholms län. Malmö FF won 2–1 against Djurgårdens IF before an attendance of 20,267 spectators.

== Preliminary round ==
Tie no	Home team	Score	Away team	Attendance
1	Arvika BK (D4)	1–0	IFK Åmål (D3)	1,026

For other results see SFS-Bolletinen - Matcher i Svenska Cupen.

== First round ==
Tie no	Home team	Score	Away team	Attendance
1	Arvika BK (D4)	1–0	IF Vesta (D3)	1,561

For other results see SFS-Bolletinen - Matcher i Svenska Cupen.

== Second round ==
The 8 matches in this round were played between 29 June and 1 July 1951.

Tie no	Home team	Score	Away team	Attendance
1	IFK Göteborg (D2)	4–0	Örebro SK (A)	4,984
2	Degerfors IF (A)	5–0	IK City (D2)	629
3	Fagerviks GF (D3)	0–9	IFK Norrköping (A)	5,310
4	IF Elfsborg (A)	4–5	Arvika BK (D4)	1,409
5	Ljusne AIK (D3)	1–3	Djurgårdens IF (A)	3,150
6	Malmö FF (A)	5–3 (aet)	IS Halmia (D2)	7,124
7	Råå IF (A)	2–1	IFK Malmö (D2)	3,042
8	Åtvidabergs FF (D2)	2–1	AIK (A)	1,390

== Quarter-finals ==
The 4 matches in this round were played on 8 July 1951.

Tie no	Home team	Score	Away team	Attendance
1	Arvika BK (D4)	3–5	Åtvidabergs FF (D2)	4,000
2	Djurgårdens IF (A)	2–1	Degerfors IF (A)	7,167
3	Malmö FF (A)	3–1	Råå IF (A)	10,905
4	IFK Norrköping (A)	4–1	IFK Göteborg (D2)	2,845

== Semi-finals ==
The semi-finals in this round were played on 15 July 1951.

Tie no	Home team	Score	Away team	Attendance
1	Djurgårdens IF (A)	3–1	IFK Norrköping (A)	9,651
2	Malmö FF (A)	10–1	Åtvidabergs FF (D2)	9,432

== Final ==
The final was played on 22 July 1951 at the Råsunda Stadium.

Tie no	Team 1	Score	Team 2	Attendance
1	Malmö FF (A)	2–1	Djurgårdens IF (A)	20,267
