= 2004 Svenska Cupen =

Tournament details
- Country: Sweden
- Teams: 98

Final positions
- Champions: Djurgårdens IF
- Runners-up: IFK Göteborg

Tournament statistics
- Matches played: 97

The 2004 Svenska Cupen was the 49th season of the main Swedish football Cup. The competition started on 28 March 2004 and concluded on 6 November 2004 with the final, held at Råsunda Stadium, Solna Municipality in Stockholm County. Djurgårdens IF won the final 3–1 against IFK Göteborg.

== First round ==
There were 34 matches played between 28 March and 12 April 2004. There were 68 teams in the first round from Division 1, Division 2 and Division 3, but also including a few teams from Division 4 and Division 5.

| Team 1 | Score | Team 2 |
28 March 2004
| Gimonäs CK | 0–3 | Luleå SK |
| IF VP Uppsala | 0–2 | Visby IF Gute FK |
| IFK Uddevalla | 2–3 | FC Trollhättan |
| FC Stockholm | 0–2 | Topkapi IK |
| Ulvåkers IF | 0–4 | Degerfors IF |
| Robertsfors IK | 1–3 | Friska Viljor FC |
| Östersunds FK | 0–4 | IFK Timrå |
| Skövde AIK | 1–5 | Husqvarna FF |
| IFK Ölme | 4–0 | Tidaholms GoIF |
| Syrianska IF Kerbura | 0–3 | Vallentuna BK |
| Ljungby IF | 1–2 | Malmö Anadolu BI |
| Ödeshögs IK | 0–4 | Rynninge IK |
| Eslövs BK | 2–1 | Höllvikens GIF |
12 April 2004
| Växjö Norra IF | 3–4 | IFK Hässleholm |
| IF Viken | 0–2 | Carlstad United BK |
| Spårvägens FF | 3–1 | IK Sirius FK |
| Väsby IK | 5–1 | Eskilstuna City FK |
| Lindsdals IF | 2–4 (aet) | Kristianstads FF |
| Bälinge IF | 2–3 | Vasalund/Essinge IF |
| Hulåns IF | 0–5 | Sandvikens IF |
| Strands IF | 2–3 (aet) | IK Brage |
| Ronneby BK | 0–2 | Bunkeflo IF |
| IS Halmia | 4–0 | Högaborgs BK |
| Kvibille BK | 1–2 | Ystads IF FF |
| Linköpings FF | 0–1 | Myresjö IF |
| BK Kenty | 2–0 | IK Tord |
| IFK Fjärås | 1–4 | Torslanda IK |
| IF Heimer | 1–2 | Gunnilse IS |
| IFK Värnamo | 1–1 (aet) p. 3–1 (p) | Ängelholms FF |
| Hamre MM | 1–4 | Tyresö FF |
| Enskede IK | 2–1 | Karlslunds IF HFK |
| Kinna IF | 2–4 | GAIS |
| Högvads BK | 0–4 | Lärje-Angereds IF |
| IK Sleipner | 5–1 | Syrianska FC |

== Second round ==
In this round the 34 winning teams from the previous round were joined by 30 teams from Allsvenskan and Superettan. The 32 matches were played between 27 April and 6 May 2004.

| Team 1 | Score | Team 2 |
27 April 2004
| Malmö Anadolu BI | 0–4 | Örgryte IS |
| FC Trollhättan | 1–2 (aet) | FC Café Opera United |
28 April 2004
| Luleå SK | 0–0 (aet); 2–4 (p) | Åtvidabergs FF |
| IK Brage | 2–0 | AIK |
| Degerfors IF | 0–4 | IFK Göteborg |
| Vallentuna BK | 1–2 | Friska Viljor FC |
29 April 2004
| Ystads IF FF | 1–4 | Malmö FF |
4 May 2004
| Bunkeflo IF | 0–1 | IF Sylvia |
| IFK Hässleholm | 4–3 | Västra Frölunda IF |
| BK Kenty | 2–3 | BK Forward |
5 May 2004
| Rynninge IK | 1–2 | Landskrona BoIS |
| Lärje-Angereds IF | 2–1 | IFK Ölme |
| Kristianstads FF | 1–3 (aet) | GIF Sundsvall |
| IK Sleipner | 1–3 | Halmstads BK |
| Torslanda IK | 1–4 | Enköpings SK FK |
| Sandvikens IF | 1–3 | Hammarby IF |
| IFK Timrå | 1–3 | Djurgårdens IF |
| IS Halmia | 0–1 (aet) | Gefle IF |
| Gunnilse IS | 1–2 | IFK Malmö FK |
| Vasalund/Essinge IF | 0–1 | Assyriska Föreningen |
| Spårvägens FF | 0–3 | IFK Norrköping |
| Enskede IK | 0–2 | Östers IF |
| GAIS | 2–0 | Falkenbergs FF |
| Topkapi IK | 3–2 | Västerås SK FK |
6 May 2004
| Tyresö FF | 1–5 | Trelleborgs FF |
| IFK Värnamo | 3–0 | Bodens BK |
| Husqvarna FF | 1–2 | Örebro SK |
| Myresjö IF | 1–2 | IF Elfsborg |
| Visby IF Gute FK | 2–1 | BK Häcken |
| Carlstad United BK | 1–2 | IF Brommapojkarna |
| Eslövs BK | 1–8 | Helsingborgs IF |
| Väsby IK | 1–2 | Kalmar FF |

== Third round ==
The 16 matches in this round were played between 19 May and 23 June 2004.

| Team 1 | Score | Team 2 |
19 May 2004
| Visby IF Gute FK | 0–1 | IFK Värnamo |
| Friska Viljor FC | 4–3 | IF Elfsborg |
| IFK Hässleholm | 2–4 | Assyriska Föreningen |
| IF Sylvia | 3–5 (aet) | Halmstads BK |
| FC Café Opera United | 4–1 | Gefle IF |
| Östers IF | 2–1 | BK Forward |
20 May 2004
| IF Brommapojkarna | 1–0 | IFK Malmö FK |
| Lärje-Angereds IF | 3–1 (aet) | IK Brage |
| Örebro SK | 2–1 | Malmö FF |
| IFK Norrköping | 3–1 | Kalmar FF |
21 May 2004
| Djurgårdens IF | 3–1 | Helsingborgs IF |
25 May 2004
| Topkapi IK | 0–2 | GAIS |
27 May 2004
| Örgryte IS | 5–0 | Åtvidabergs FF |
| GIF Sundsvall | 1–0 | Enköpings SK FK |
15 June 2004
| IFK Göteborg | 4–1 | Trelleborgs FF |
23 June 2004
| Hammarby IF | 1–0 | Landskrona BoIS |

== Fourth round ==
The 8 matches in this round were played between 17 June and 6 July 2004.

| Team 1 | Score | Team 2 |
17 June 2004
| Lärje-Angereds IF | 0–4 | GAIS |
23 June 2004
| Östers IF | 3–2 | Örgryte IS |
29 June 2004
| IFK Värnamo | 2–2 (aet); 2–4 (p) | Hammarby IF |
2 July 2004
| Assyriska Föreningen | 2–2 (aet); 4–3 (p) | IF Brommapojkarna |
| Friska Viljor FC | 0–4 | IFK Göteborg |
| Halmstads BK | 2–4 (aet) | Örebro SK |
| Djurgårdens IF | 3–2 | GIF Sundsvall |
6 July 2004
| IFK Norrköping | 3–1 (aet) | FC Café Opera United |

== Quarter-finals ==
The 4 matches in this round were played between 29 July and 14 October 2004.

| Team 1 | Score | Team 2 |
29 July 2004
| IFK Göteborg | 3–2 | Örebro SK |
5 August 2004
| GAIS | 0–1 | Hammarby IF |
| Östers IF | 2–0 | Assyriska Föreningen |
14 October 2004
| IFK Norrköping | 0–1 | Djurgårdens IF |

== Semi-finals ==
The semi-finals were played on 20 October and 21 October 2004.

| Team 1 | Score | Team 2 |
20 October 2004
| Östers IF | 0–2 | Djurgårdens IF |
21 October 2004
| Hammarby IF | 0–2 | IFK Göteborg |

== Final ==
The final was played on 6 November 2004 at the Råsunda Stadium.

6 November 2004
19:00

| Djurgårdens IF | 3–1 | IFK Göteborg |
|---|---|---|
| Sjölund 11', 66'; Johansson 56' | | Alexandersson 52' |

Råsunda, Solna
Attendance: 9,417
Referee: Leif Sundell
