= 1950 Svenska Cupen =

Tournament details
- Country: Sweden
- Teams: 32

Final positions
- Champions: AIK
- Runners-up: Helsingborgs IF

Tournament statistics
- Matches played: 31

The 1950 Svenska Cupen was the tenth season of the main Swedish football Cup. A significant achievement was made by third division Fagerviks GF who reached the semi-finals before their winning sequence came to an end. The competition was concluded on 23 July 1950 with the final, held at Råsunda Stadium, Solna in Stockholms län. AIK won 3–2 against Helsingborgs IF before an attendance of 14,154 spectators.

== Preliminary round ==
Tie no	Home team	Score	Away team	Attendance
1	Ljusdals IF (D3)	1–2 (aet)	Hofors AIF (D3)	1,954

For other results see SFS-Bolletinen - Matcher i Svenska Cupen.

== First round ==
Tie no	Home team	Score	Away team	Attendance
1	Fagerviks GF (D3)	3–1	Nybro IF (D3)	2,127
2	Hofors AIF (D3)	5–0	Sandviks IK (D4)	1,016

For other results see SFS-Bolletinen - Matcher i Svenska Cupen.

== Second round ==
The 8 matches in this round were played on 2 July 1950.

Tie no	Home team	Score	Away team	Attendance
1	AIK (A)	3–2	Landskrona BoIS (D2)	6,065
2	Fagerviks GF (D3)	2–1	Degerfors IF (A)	2,228
3	GAIS (A)	1–2 (aet)	Djurgårdens IF (A)	3,666
4	Helsingborgs IF (A)	6–1	IFK Göteborg (A)	6,274
5	IF Friska Viljor (N)	2–6	IS Halmia (A)	1,500
6	Malmö FF (A)	3–0	BK Kenty (D3)	5,213
7	IFK Norrköping (A)	0–2	IF Elfsborg (A)	3,263
8	Åtvidabergs FF (D2)	2–3	Hofors AIF (D3)	1,000

== Quarter-finals ==
The 4 matches in this round were played on 9 July 1950.

Tie no	Home team	Score	Away team	Attendance
1	Djurgårdens IF (A)	2–3	Fagerviks GF (D3)	3,259
2	Hofors AIF (D3)	1–6	AIK (A)	3,090
3	IF Elfsborg (A)	0–1	Helsingborgs IF (A)	3,598
4	IS Halmia (A)	1–0	Malmö FF (A)	5,948

== Semi-finals ==
The semi-finals in this round were played on 16 July 1950.

Tie no	Home team	Score	Away team	Attendance
1	AIK (A)	3–1	IS Halmia (A)	6,625
2	Fagerviks GF (D3)	1–3	Helsingborgs IF (A)	9,716

== Final ==
The final was played on 23 July 1950 at the Råsunda Stadium.

Tie no	Team 1	Score	Team 2	Attendance
1	AIK (A)	3–2	Helsingborgs IF (A)	14,154
