= 1942 Svenska Cupen =

Tournament details
- Country: Sweden
- Teams: 48

Final positions
- Champions: GAIS
- Runners-up: IF Elfsborg

Tournament statistics
- Matches played: 48

The 1942 Svenska Cupen was the second season of the main Swedish football Cup. The competition was concluded on 18 October 1942 with the final, held at Råsunda Stadium, Solna in Stockholms län. GAIS won the final 2–1 against IF Elfsborg before an attendance of 10,013 spectators.

== Preliminary round ==
Tie no	Home team	Score	Away team	Attendance
1	Hallstahammars SK (D2)	0–1	Avesta AIK (D3)	575

For other results see SFS-Bolletinen - Matcher i Svenska Cupen.

== First round ==
Tie no	Home team	Score	Away team	Attendance
1	IF Elfsborg (A)	3–1	IFK Norrköping (A)	3,076
2	Avesta AIK (D3)	2–0 (aet)	Västerås IK (D3)	1,252

For other results see SFS-Bolletinen - Matcher i Svenska Cupen.

== Second round ==
The 8 matches in this round were played on 10 and 12 July 1942.

Tie no	Home team	Score	Away team	Attendance
1	GAIS (A)	2–1 (aet)	Avesta AIK (D3)	2,333
2	IK Sleipner (D2)	3–2 (aet)	Ludvika FfI (D2)	3,549
3	Degerfors IF (A)	4–1 (aet)	Helsingborgs IF (A)	3,582
4	IFK Eskilstuna (D2)	4–1	Malmö FF (A)	5,211
5	Domsjö IF (D3)	2–5 (aet)	IF Elfsborg (A)	3,000
6	Ljusne AIK (D2)	3–2	Olofströms IF (D2)	1,500
7	Billingsfors IK (D2)	2–0	Lundby IF (D2)	800
8	Reymersholms IK (A)	1–5	Halmstads BK (D2)	4,094

== Quarter-finals ==
The 4 matches in this round were played between 17 July and 19 July 1942.

Tie no	Home team	Score	Away team	Attendance
1	GAIS (A)	6–1	Degerfors IF' (A)	6,951
2	IF Elfsborg (A)	8–1	Billingsfors IK (D2)	3,268
3	Halmstads BK (D2)	4–1	IK Sleipner (D2)	4,379
4	IFK Eskilstuna (D2)	3–1	Ljusne AIK (D2)	3,342

== Semi-finals ==
The semi-finals in this round were played on 23 August 1942.

Tie no	Home team	Score	Away team	Attendance
1	IFK Eskilstuna (D2)	1–2	IF Elfsborg (A)	6,761
2	GAIS (A)	3–1	Halmstads BK (D2)	6,557

== Final ==
The final was played on 18 October 1942 at the Råsunda Stadium.

Tie no	Team 1	Score	Team 2	Attendance
1	GAIS (A)	2–1	IF Elfsborg (A)	10,013
