= 1941 Svenska Cupen =

Tournament details
- Country: Sweden
- Teams: 32

Final positions
- Champions: Helsingborgs IF
- Runners-up: IK Sleipner

Tournament statistics
- Matches played: 31

The 1941 Svenska Cupen was the first season of the main Swedish football Cup. The competition was concluded on 26 October 1941 with the final, held at Råsunda Stadium, Solna in Stockholm County. Helsingborgs IF won the final 3–1 against IK Sleipner before an attendance of 10,763 spectators.

== First round ==
Tie no	Home team	Score	Away team	Attendance
1	IFK Eskilstuna (D2)	4–3 (aet)	Sandvikens IF (A)	1,650
2	Visby AIK	2–14	AIK (A)	2,027
3	Karlskoga IF (D2)	3–5 (aet)	GAIS (D2)	750
4	IFK Göteborg (A)	10–0	Karlskrona BK (D3)	2,169
5	Bodens BK (D3)	0–2	Landskrona BoIS (A)	2,800
6	IF Castor (D3)	2–4	IK Brage (A)	1,000
7	Billingsfors IK (D2)	2–3	Örebro SK (D2)	300
8	Helsingborgs IF (A)	6–1	IFK Uddevalla (D3)	2,032
9	Ljusne AIK (D3)	2–0	IFK Norrköping (A)	2,075
10	IS Halmia (D2)	4–1	Värtans IK (D2)	666
11	IK Sleipner (A)	4–1	IF Elfsborg (A)	1,991
12	Surahammars IF (D2)	2–4 (aet)	Gårda BK (A)	1,991
13	Malmö FF (A)	11–0	Vivstavarvs IK (D3)	3,714
14	Enköpings SK (D3)	1–2	Waggeryds IK (D3)	700
15	Sandvikens AIK (D2)	2–1	Kramfors IF (D3)	565
16	Clemensnäs IF (D3)	1–7	Degerfors IF (A)	1,500

For other results see SFS-Bolletinen - Matcher i Svenska Cupen.

== Second round ==
The 8 matches in this round were played on 27 July 1941.

Tie no	Home team	Score	Away team	Attendance
1	GAIS (D2)	3–1	Sandvikens AIK (D2)	3,649
2	IK Sleipner (A)	4–3	IFK Eskilstuna (D2)	3,065
3	Degerfors IF (A)	4–3	IS Halmia (D2)	1,500
4	IK Brage (A)	3–2	IFK Göteborg (A)	1,200
5	Örebro SK (D2)	3–0	Ljusne AIK (D3)	2,350
6	AIK (A)	2–1	Malmö FF (A)	8,889
7	Waggeryds IK (D3)	2–8	Helsingborgs IF (A)	2,575
8	Landskrona BoIS (A)	3–0 (aet)	Gårda BK (A)	1,671

== Quarter-finals ==
The 4 matches in this round were played between 13 August and 17 August 1941.

Tie no	Home team	Score	Away team	Attendance
1	Helsingborgs IF (A)	9–0	Landskrona BoIS (A)	4,522
2	GAIS (D2)	0–3	Degerfors IF (A)	6,246
3	Örebro SK (D2)	0–3	IK Sleipner (A)	3,126
4	AIK (A)	0–5	IK Brage (A)	16,355

== Semi-finals ==
The semi-finals in this round were played on 14 September 1941.

Tie no	Home team	Score	Away team	Attendance
1	Helsingborgs IF (A)	6–2	Degerfors IF (A)	5,557
2	IK Sleipner (A)	3–2 (aet)	IK Brage (A)	6,610

== Final ==
The final was played on 26 October 1941 at the Råsunda Stadium.

Tie no	Team 1	Score	Team 2	Attendance
1	Helsingborgs IF (A)	3–1	IK Sleipner (A)	10,763
