= 1993–94 Svenska Cupen =

Tournament details
- Country: Sweden
- Teams: 634

Final positions
- Champions: IFK Norrköping
- Runners-up: Helsingborgs IF

Tournament statistics
- Matches played: 633

The 1993–94 Svenska Cupen was the 39th season of the main Swedish football Cup. The competition started on 29 April 1993 and was concluded on 12 May 1994 with the final held in Gamla Ullevi, Gothenburg. IFK Norrköping won 4–3 (golden goal) against Helsingborgs IF before an attendance of 4,021 spectators.

== Preliminary round 1 ==
Tie no	Home team	Score	Away team	Attendance
1	IK Rex (D4)	0–3	Valbo FF (D4)	

For other results see SFS-Bolletinen - Matcher i Svenska Cupen.

== Preliminary round 2 ==
Tie no	Home team	Score	Away team	Attendance
1	Islingby IK (D4)	1–3	Kvarnsvedens IK (D3)	
2	Valbo FF (D4)	5–3	IF Vulcanus (D4)	

For other results see SFS-Bolletinen - Matcher i Svenska Cupen.

== First round ==
Tie no	Home team	Score	Away team	Attendance
1	Falu BS (D4)	0–5	Kvarnsvedens IK (D3)	
2	Östansbo IS (WC)	1–5	Valbo FF (D4)	

For other results see SFS-Bolletinen - Matcher i Svenska Cupen.

== Second round ==
Tie no	Home team	Score	Away team	Attendance
1	Korsnäs IF FK (D4)	4–5 (gg)	Kvarnsvedens IK (D3)	
2	Valbo FF (D4)	1–0	Sandvikens IF (D3)	

For other results see SFS-Bolletinen - Matcher i Svenska Cupen.

== Third round ==
Tie no	Home team	Score	Away team	Attendance
1	Kvarnsvedens IK (D3)	2–1	Ludvika FK (D2)	
2	Valbo FF (D4)	4–2	IK Sätra (D3)	

For other results see SFS-Bolletinen - Matcher i Svenska Cupen.

== Fourth round ==
Tie no	Home team	Score	Away team	Attendance
1	Säters IF FK (D4)	2–3	Kvarnsvedens IK (D3)	412
2	Valbo FF (D4)	2–7	Djurgårdens IF (A)	907

For other results see SFS-Bolletinen - Matcher i Svenska Cupen.

== Fifth round ==
The 8 matches in this round were played between 22 and 30 September 1993.

Tie no	Home team	Score	Away team	Attendance
1	Malmö FF (A)	3–1	Degerfors IF (A)	1,441
2	Djurgårdens IF (A)	2–0	Västra Frölunda IF (A)	200
3	Veberöds AIF (D2)	1–2 (gg)	IF Elfsborg (D1)	1,942
4	Landskrona BoIS (D1)	1–0	BK Häcken (A)	1,346
5	GIF Sundsvall (D1)	2–3 (gg)	Helsingborgs IF (A)	1,987
6	Kvarnsvedens IK (D3)	1–2 (gg)	IFK Norrköping (A)	621
7	IFK Luleå (D1)	3–2	Halmstads BK (A)	683
8	Östers IF (A)	2–2 (p. 4–2)	Örgryte IS (A)	356

== Quarter-finals ==
The 4 matches in this round were played between 6 and 20 October 1993.

Tie no	Home team	Score	Away team	Attendance
1	Landskrona BoIS (D1)	0–2	Malmö FF (A)	4,474
2	IFK Luleå (D1)	3–2	Djurgårdens IF (A)	897
3	IFK Norrköping (A)	5–1	Östers IF (A)	836
4	Helsingborgs IF (A)	6–1	IF Elfsborg (D1)	4,049

== Semi-finals ==
The semi-finals were played on 27 and 28 April 1994.

Tie no	Home team	Score	Away team	Attendance
1	Malmö FF (A)	2–4	Helsingborgs IF (A)	9,872
2	IFK Luleå (D1)	1–3	IFK Norrköping (A)	2,189

== Final ==
The final was played on 12 May 1994 in Gothenburg.

Tie no	Team 1	Score	Team 2	Attendance
1	IFK Norrköping (A)	4–3 (gg)	Helsingborgs IF (A)	4,021
