= 1947 Svenska Cupen =

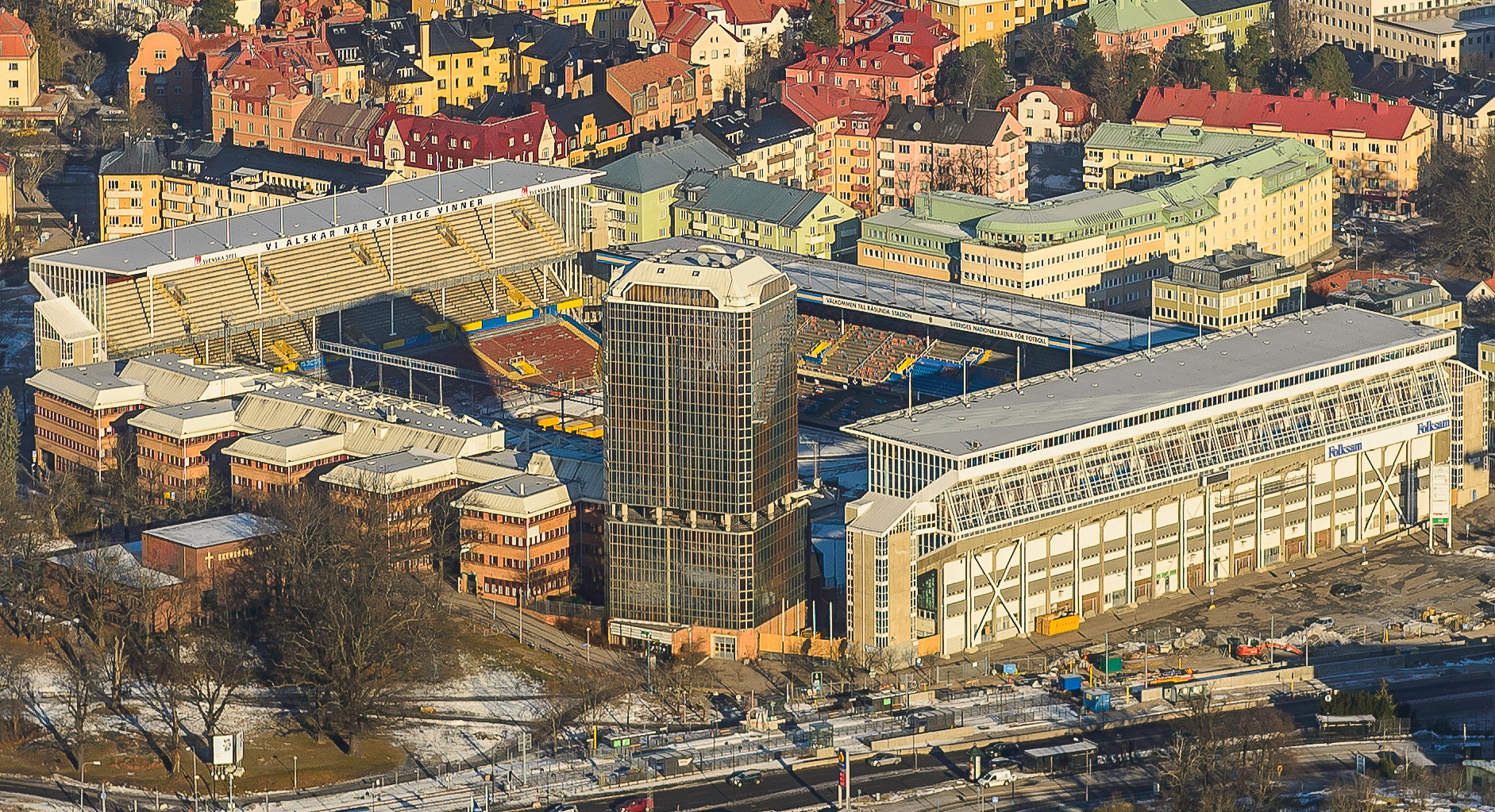
- Råsunda Stadium where the 1947 Svenska Cupen was held.

Tournament details
- Country: Sweden
- Teams: 58

Final positions
- Champions: Malmö FF
- Runners-up: AIK

Tournament statistics
- Matches played: 57

The 1947 Svenska Cupen was the seventh season of the main Swedish football Cup. The competition was concluded on 24 August 1947 with the final, held at Råsunda Stadium, Solna in Stockholms län. Malmö FF won 3–2 against AIK before an attendance of 26,705 spectators.

== Preliminary round 1 ==
Tie no	Home team	Score	Away team	Attendance
1	IFK Kumla (D4)	3–1 (aet)	IFK Strömstad (D4)	1,000

For other results see SFS-Bolletinen - Matcher i Svenska Cupen.

== Preliminary round 2 ==
Tie no	Home team	Score	Away team	Attendance
1	IFK Kumla (D4)	2–1	IK City (D3)	1,000

For other results see SFS-Bolletinen - Matcher i Svenska Cupen.

== Preliminary round 3 ==
Tie no	Home team	Score	Away team	Attendance
1	IFK Eskilstuna (D2)	1–5	IFK Kumla (D4)	640

For other results see SFS-Bolletinen - Matcher i Svenska Cupen.

== First round ==
Tie no	Home team	Score	Away team	Attendance
1	IFK Kumla (D4)	2–3	Reymersholms IK (D2)	1,400
2	IFK Åmål (D3)	2–3 (aet)	IF Elfsborg (A)	2,500

For other results see SFS-Bolletinen - Matcher i Svenska Cupen.

== Second round ==
The 8 matches in this round were played between 4 and 6 July 1947.

Tie no	Home team	Score	Away team	Attendance
1	IF Elfsborg (A)	2–5	GAIS (A)	2,772
2	Ludvika FfI (D2)	1–1 (aet) (by lots)	AIK (A)	2,667
3	Reymersholms IK (D2)	2–2 (aet) (by lots)	Djurgårdens IF (A)	2,590
4	Sandviks IK (N)	w/o	Örebro SK (A)	
5	IK Sleipner (D2)	1–3	Malmö FF (A)	2,226
6	Tidaholms GIF (D2)	1–2	IS Halmia (A)	4,000
7	Wifsta/Östrands IF (N)	3–5	Helsingborgs IF (A)	2,000
8	Åtvidabergs FF (D2)	5–1	Sandvikens IF (D2)	1,400

== Quarter-finals ==
The 4 matches in this round were played on 12 and 13 July 1947.

Tie no	Home team	Score	Away team	Attendance
1	Helsingborgs IF (A)	4–1	Sandviks IK (N)	2,910
2	AIK (A)	3–2	Djurgårdens IF (A)	9,388
3	GAIS (A)	1–0	IS Halmia (A)	3,438
4	Malmö FF (A)	5–2	Åtvidabergs FF (D2)	9,234

== Semi-finals ==
The semi-finals in this round were played on 20 July 1947.

Tie no	Home team	Score	Away team	Attendance
1	AIK (A)	3–2	GAIS (A)	10,467
2	Helsingborgs IF (A)	0–3	Malmö FF (A)	9,472

== Final ==
The final was played on 24 August 1947 at the Råsunda Stadium.

Tie no	Team 1	Score	Team 2	Attendance
1	AIK (A)	2–3	Malmö FF (A)	26,705
