= 1946 Svenska Cupen =

Tournament details
- Country: Sweden
- Teams: 48

Final positions
- Champions: Malmö FF
- Runners-up: Åtvidabergs FF

Tournament statistics
- Matches played: 47

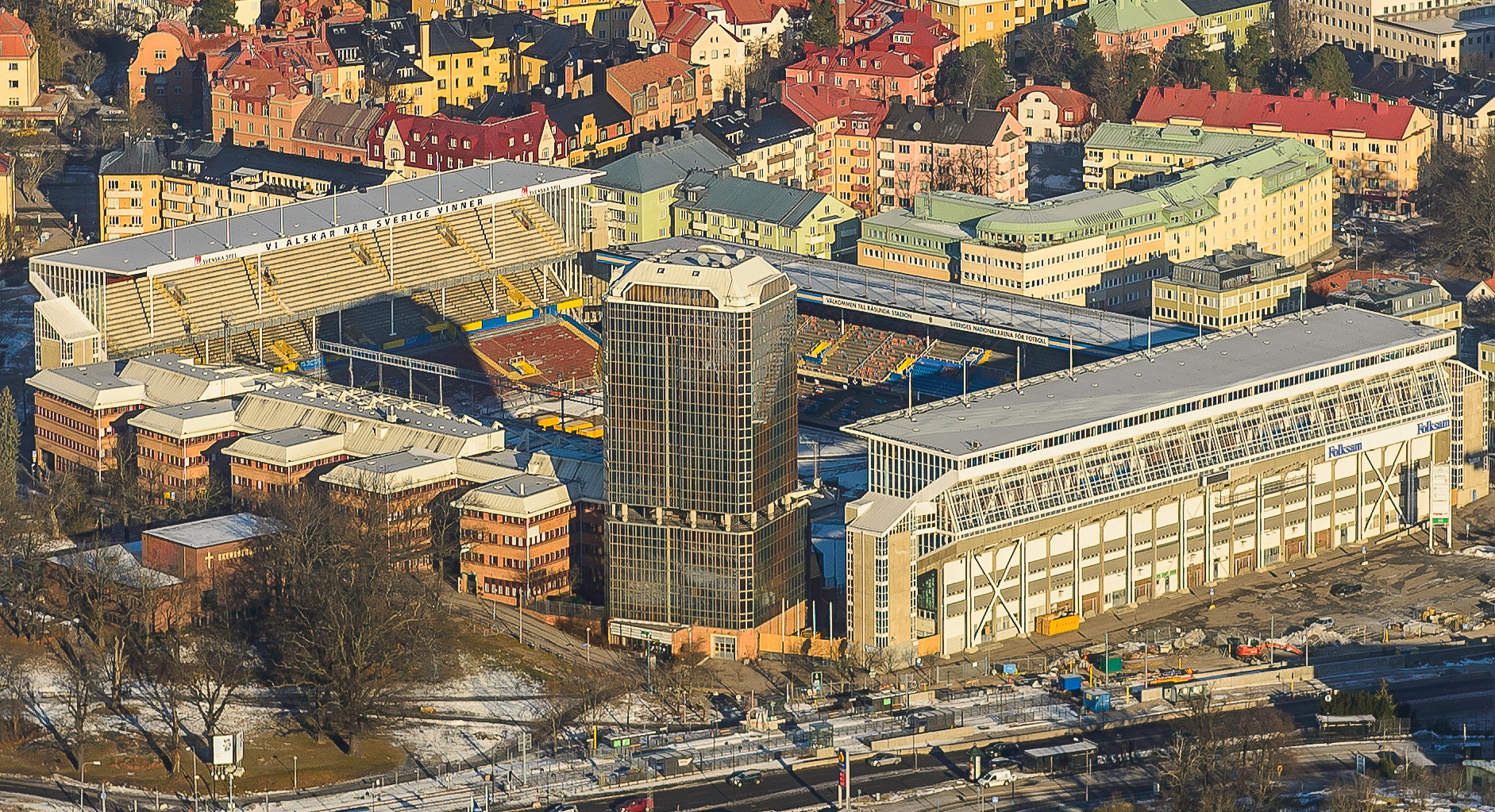
Råsunda Stadium, Solna Municipality in Stockholm, Sweden (2013)

The 1946 Svenska Cupen was the sixth season of the main Swedish football Cup. The competition was concluded on 25 August 1946 with the final, held at Råsunda Stadium, Solna in Stockholms län. Malmö FF won 3–0 against Åtvidabergs FF before an attendance of 15,173 spectators.

== Preliminary round 1 ==
Tie no	Home team	Score	Away team	Attendance
1	IFK Åmål (D3)	4–3	IFK Uddevalla (D2)	513

For other results see SFS-Bolletinen - Matcher i Svenska Cupen.

== Preliminary round 2 ==
Tie no	Home team	Score	Away team	Attendance
1	IFK Åmål (D3)	4–1	Gårda BK (D2)	682

For other results see SFS-Bolletinen - Matcher i Svenska Cupen.

== First round ==
Tie no	Home team	Score	Away team	Attendance
1	Munksund Skuthamns SK (N)	5–5 (aet) (by lots)	IFK Åmål (D3)	1,205

For other results see SFS-Bolletinen - Matcher i Svenska Cupen.

== Second round ==
The 8 matches in this round were played between 30 June and 10 July 1946.

Tie no	Home team	Score	Away team	Attendance
1	Sandviks IK (N)	3–1	Munksund Skuthamns SK (N)	800
2	Malmö FF (A)	3–0	IK Brage (D2)	7,921
3	IF Elfsborg (A)	1–2 (aet)	IK Sleipner (D2)	3,333
4	Helsingborgs IF (A)	5–0	Surahammars IF (D2)	6,393
5	Tidaholms GIF (D2)	4–2	Degerfors IF (A)	2,000
6	Åtvidabergs FF (D2)	2–1	IS Halmia (A)	1,525
7	GAIS (A)	3–2 (aet)	IFK Göteborg (A)	4,881
8	IFK Norrköping (A)	0–2	AIK (A)	6,335

== Quarter-finals ==
The 4 matches in this round were played on 14 July 1946.

Tie no	Home team	Score	Away team	Attendance
1	AIK (A)	6–1	Sandviks IK (N)	4,765
2	GAIS (A)	1–2 (aet)	Helsingborgs IF (A)	3,608
3	IK Sleipner (D2)	1–3	Malmö FF (A)	5,069
4	Åtvidabergs FF (D2)	3–1 (aet)	Tidaholms GIF (D2)	1,500

== Semi-finals ==
The semi-finals in this round were played on 21 July 1946.

Tie no	Home team	Score	Away team	Attendance
1	AIK (A)	1–2	Åtvidabergs FF (D2)	8,162
2	Malmö FF (A)	7–0	Helsingborgs IF (A)	12,659

== Final ==
The final was played on 25 August 1946 at the Råsunda Stadium.

Tie no	Team 1	Score	Team 2	Attendance
1	Malmö FF (A)	3–0	Åtvidabergs FF (A)	15,173
