= Ove Karlsson (footballer) =

Swedish footballer (1915–1982)

Personal information
- Full name: Ove Karlsson
- Date of birth: 2 August 1915
- Place of birth: Malmö, Sweden
- Date of death: 23 May 1982 (aged 66)
- Place of death: Solna, Sweden
- Position: Defender

Senior career*
Years	Team	Apps	(Gls)
1936–1943	Malmö FF	114	(0)
1943–1948	AIK	104	(0)

International career
1945	Sweden	1	(0)
- * Club domestic league appearances and goals

Ove Karlsson (2 August 1915 – 23 May 1982) was a Swedish footballer who played as a defender.
