= 1943 Svenska Cupen =

Tournament details
- Country: Sweden
- Teams: 49

Final positions
- Champions: IFK Norrköping
- Runners-up: AIK

Tournament statistics
- Matches played: 50

The 1943 Svenska Cupen was the third season of the main Swedish football Cup. The competition was concluded on 3 October and 14 November 1943 with the final, held at Råsunda Stadium, Solna in Stockholms län. IFK Norrköping drew 0–0 against AIK and won the replay 5–2 at Norrköping a month later before an attendance of 19,595 spectators.

== Preliminary round ==
Tie no	Home team	Score	Away team	Attendance
1	Ljusne AIK (D3)	3–1	Iggesunds IK (D3)	500

For other results see SFS-Bolletinen - Matcher i Svenska Cupen.

== First round ==
Tie no	Home team	Score	Away team	Attendance
1	IF Elfsborg (A)	7–1	Tidaholms GIF (D2)	2,151
2	Ljusne AIK (D3)	3–1	Avesta AIK (D2)	1,000

For other results see SFS-Bolletinen - Matcher i Svenska Cupen.

== Second round ==
The 8 matches in this round were played on 9 and 11 July 1943.

Tie no	Home team	Score	Away team	Attendance
1	GAIS (A)	1–0	IFK Holmsund (D3)	1,961
2	IFK Västerås (D2)	1–8	IF Elfsborg (A)	2,921
3	IFK Eskilstuna (A)	0–4	Degerfors IF (A)	5,400
4	Helsingborgs IF (A)	2–3	Ljusne AIK (D3)	3,669
5	Sandvikens IF (A)	2–3	AIK (A)	2,126
6	Karlskoga IF (D2)	7–2	Domsjö IF (D3)	1,278
7	Malmö FF (A)	4–3 (aet)	Halmstads BK (A)	6,508
8	Djurgårdens IF (D2)	1–3	IFK Norrköping (A)	7,476

== Quarter-finals ==
The 4 matches in this round were played on 16 July and 18 July 1943.

Tie no	Home team	Score	Away team	Attendance
1	AIK (A)	4–2 (aet)	Ljusne AIK (D3)	8,028
2	Degerfors IF (A)	0–1	Karlskoga IF (D2)	3,409
3	IF Elfsborg (A)	4–1	Malmö FF (A)	4,308
4	IFK Norrköping (A)	3–0	GAIS (A)	4,760

== Semi-finals ==
The semi-finals in this round were played on 25 July and 12 September 1943.

Tie no	Home team	Score	Away team	Attendance
1	AIK (A)	4–2 (aet)	IF Elfsborg (A)	12,979
2	IFK Norrköping (A)	8–1	Karlskoga IF (D2)	5,717

== Final ==
The final was played on 3 October at the Råsunda Stadium followed by the replay on 14 November 1943 at Norrköping.

Tie no	Team 1	Score	Team 2	Attendance
1	IFK Norrköping (A)	0–0	AIK (A)	22,478
replay	IFK Norrköping (A)	5–2	AIK (A)	19,595
