= Glenn Myrthil =

Swedish footballer

Personal information
- Full name: Glenn J. Myrthil
- Date of birth: 2 August 1964 (age 62)
- Position: Attacking midfielder

Senior career*
Years	Team	Apps	(Gls)
1984–1989	Djurgårdens IF	116	(47)
1990–1999	Spårvägens FF (Note: 1990 season as Spårvägens GoIF.)		
1999–2002	Bromstens IK		
- * Club domestic league appearances and goals

Glenn J. Myrthil (born 2 August 1964) is a Swedish former footballer. He made 46 Allsvenskan appearances for Djurgårdens IF, and scored eleven goals.

== Honours ==
=== Club ===
Djurgårdens IF

- Division 2 Norra (1): 1985
