= Peter Skoog =

Swedish footballer

Personal information
- Full name: Peter Skoog
- Date of birth: 11 February 1965 (age 61)
- Position: Forward

Senior career*
| Years | Team | Apps | (Gls) |
| 1986 | Sundbybergs IK | | |
| 1987–1992 | Djurgårdens IF | 106 | (35) |
| 1993–1995 | BKV Norrtälje | 43 | (14) |
- * Club domestic league appearances and goals

Leif Peter Skoog (born 11 February 1965) is a Swedish former footballer. He made 86 Allsvenskan appearances for Djurgårdens IF and scored 22 goals.
