= 1953 Svenska Cupen =

Tournament details
- Country: Sweden

Final positions
- Champions: Malmö FF
- Runners-up: IFK Norrköping

The 1953 Svenska Cupen was the 12th season of the main Swedish football Cup. The competition was concluded on 26 July 1953 with the final, held at Råsunda Stadium, Solna in Stockholm County. Malmö FF won 3–2 against IFK Norrköping before an attendance of 20,356 spectators.

== First round ==
For all results see SFS-Bolletinen - Matcher i Svenska Cupen.

== Second round ==
For all results see SFS-Bolletinen - Matcher i Svenska Cupen.

== Quarter-finals ==
The 4 matches in this round were played on 19 July 1953.

Tie no	Home team	Score	Away team	Attendance
1	Hammarby IF (D1)	4–1	Landskrona BoIS (D3)	4,383
2	IFK Norrköping (A)	5–1	Kalmar FF (D1)	4,199
3	IF Älgarna (D3)	1–6	Helsingborgs IF (A)	6,133
4	Malmö FF (A)	3–1	Degerfors IF (A)	10,188

== Semi-finals ==
The semi-finals in this round were played on 22 and 23 July 1953.

Tie no	Home team	Score	Away team	Attendance
1	Helsingborgs IF (A)	0–3	Malmö FF (A)	14,063
2	Hammarby IF (D1)	1–6	IFK Norrköping (A)	8,822

== Final ==
The final was played on 26 July 1953 at the Råsunda Stadium.

Tie no	Team 1	Score	Team 2	Attendance
1	Malmö FF (A)	3–2	IFK Norrköping (A)	20,356
