= 1968–69 Svenska Cupen =

Tournament details
- Country: Sweden

Final positions
- Champions: IFK Norrköping
- Runners-up: AIK

The 1968–69 Svenska Cupen was the 14th season of the main Swedish football Cup. The competition was concluded on 23 June 1969 with the final, held at Råsunda, Solna. IFK Norrköping won 1–0 against AIK before an attendance of 7,832 spectators.

== Qualifying round ==
For all results see SFS-Bolletinen - Matcher i Svenska Cupen.

== First round ==
For all results see SFS-Bolletinen - Matcher i Svenska Cupen.

== Second round ==
For all results see SFS-Bolletinen - Matcher i Svenska Cupen.

== Third round ==
For all results see SFS-Bolletinen - Matcher i Svenska Cupen.

== Fourth round ==
For all results see SFS-Bolletinen - Matcher i Svenska Cupen.

== Fifth round ==
For all results see SFS-Bolletinen - Matcher i Svenska Cupen.

== Quarter-finals ==
The 4 matches and one replay match in this round were played between 7 and 23 April 1969.

Tie no	Home team	Score	Away team	Attendance
1	Djurgårdens IF (A)	1–1 (aet)	AIK (A)	3,816
Replay	AIK (A)	1–0	Djurgårdens IF (A)	2,562
2	Östers IF (A)	1–2	Kalmar FF (D1)	3,628
3	Malmö FF (A)	1–2	Örebro SK (A)	6,536
4	IF Elfsborg (A)	0–2	IFK Norrköping (A)	4,292

== Semi-finals ==
The semi-finals in this round were played on 7 May 1969, the replay match was played on 18 May 1969.

Tie no	Home team	Score	Away team	Attendance
1	AIK (A)	1–0	Örebro SK (A)	4,020
2	Kalmar FF (D1)	1–1 (aet)	IFK Norrköping (A)	5,651
Replay	IFK Norrköping (A)	5–1	Kalmar FF (D1)	3,749

== Final ==
The final was played on 23 June 1969 at Råsunda.

Tie no	Team 1	Score	Team 2	Attendance
1	AIK (A)	0–1	IFK Norrköping (A)	7,832
