= 1989–90 Svenska Cupen =

Tournament details
- Country: Sweden

Final positions
- Champions: Djurgårdens IF
- Runners-up: BK Häcken

The 1989–90 Svenska Cupen was the 35th season of the main Swedish football Cup. The competition started in 1989 and concluded in 1990 with the final, held at Råsunda Stadium, Solna Municipality in Stockholm County. Djurgårdens IF won the final 3–0 against BK Häcken.
