= 1969–70 Svenska Cupen =

Tournament details
- Country: Sweden

Final positions
- Champions: Åtvidabergs FF
- Runners-up: Sandvikens IF

The 1969–70 Svenska Cupen was the 15th season of the main Swedish football Cup. The competition was concluded on 28 May 1970 with the final, held at Studenternas IP, Uppsala. Åtvidabergs FF won 2–0 against Sandvikens IF before an attendance of 3,110 spectators.

== First round ==
For all results see SFS-Bolletinen - Matcher i Svenska Cupen.

== Second round ==
For all results see SFS-Bolletinen - Matcher i Svenska Cupen.

== Third round ==
For all results see SFS-Bolletinen - Matcher i Svenska Cupen.

== Fourth round ==
For all results see SFS-Bolletinen - Matcher i Svenska Cupen.

== Fifth round ==
For all results see SFS-Bolletinen - Matcher i Svenska Cupen.

== Quarter-finals ==
Three quarter finals were held on 11 October 1969, the remaining quarter final was held on 20 March 1970. The replay match was held on 4 April 1970.

Tie no	Home team	Score	Away team	Attendance
1	Sandvikens IF (D1)	5–1	Västra Frölunda IF (D1)	1,258
2	IFK Malmö (D1)	1–1 (aet)	Åtvidabergs FF (A)	3,010
Replay	Åtvidabergs FF (A)	1–0	IFK Malmö (D1)	275
3	IK Sirius (A)	1–3	Nyköpings BIS (D3)	974
4	AIK (A)	1–0	IFK Norrköping (A)	625

== Semi-finals ==
The semi-finals in this round were played on 7 May 1969, the replay match was played on 18 May 1969.

Tie no	Home team	Score	Away team	Attendance
1	Sandvikens IF (D1)	4–2	Nyköpings BIS (D3)	392
2	AIK (A)	1–3	Åtvidabergs FF (A)	787

== Final ==
The final was played on 28 May 1970 at Studenternas IP.

Tie no	Team 1	Score	Team 2	Attendance
1	Sandvikens IF (D1)	0–2	Åtvidabergs FF (A)	3,110
