= 1970–71 Svenska Cupen =

Tournament details
- Country: Sweden

Final positions
- Champions: Åtvidabergs FF
- Runners-up: Malmö FF

The 1970–71 Svenska Cupen was the 16th season of the main Swedish football Cup. The competition was concluded on 30 June 1971 with the final, held at Malmö Stadion, Malmö. Åtvidabergs FF won 3–2 against Malmö FF before an attendance of 7,544 spectators.

== Group stage ==
For all results see SFS-Bolletinen - Matcher i Svenska Cupen.

== First round ==
For all results see SFS-Bolletinen - Matcher i Svenska Cupen.

== Second round ==
For all results see SFS-Bolletinen - Matcher i Svenska Cupen.

== Third round ==
For all results see SFS-Bolletinen - Matcher i Svenska Cupen.

== Fourth round ==
For all results see SFS-Bolletinen - Matcher i Svenska Cupen.

== Fifth round ==
For all results see SFS-Bolletinen - Matcher i Svenska Cupen.

== Quarter-finals ==
The quarter finals were held on 4 and 5 April 1971.

Tie no	Home team	Score	Away team	Attendance
1	Halmstads BK (D1)	0–4	Åtvidabergs FF (A)	1,115
2	KB Karlskoga FF (D1)	1–5	Malmö FF (A)	2,549
3	Jönköpings Södra IF (D1)	3–1	IF Elfsborg (A)	284
4	Degerfors IF (D1)	1–2	IFK Norrköping (A)	674

== Semi-finals ==
The semi-finals were played on 5 May 1971.

Tie no	Home team	Score	Away team	Attendance
1	Åtvidabergs FF (A)	1–0	IFK Norrköping (A)	3,839
2	Jönköpings Södra IF (D1)	0–3	Malmö FF (A)	5,539

== Final ==
The final was played on 30 June 1971 at Malmö Stadion.

Tie no	Team 1	Score	Team 2	Attendance
1	Malmö FF (A)	2–3	Åtvidabergs FF (A)	7,544
