= 1974–75 Svenska Cupen =

Tournament details
- Country: Sweden

Final positions
- Champions: Malmö FF
- Runners-up: Djurgårdens IF

The 1974–75 Svenska Cupen was the 20th season of the main Swedish football Cup. The competition started in 1974 and concluded in 1975 with the final, held at Malmö Stadion, Malmö. Malmö FF won the final 1–0 against Djurgårdens IF.
