= 1944 Svenska Cupen =

Tournament details
- Country: Sweden
- Teams: 48

Final positions
- Champions: Malmö FF
- Runners-up: IFK Norrköping

Tournament statistics
- Matches played: 47

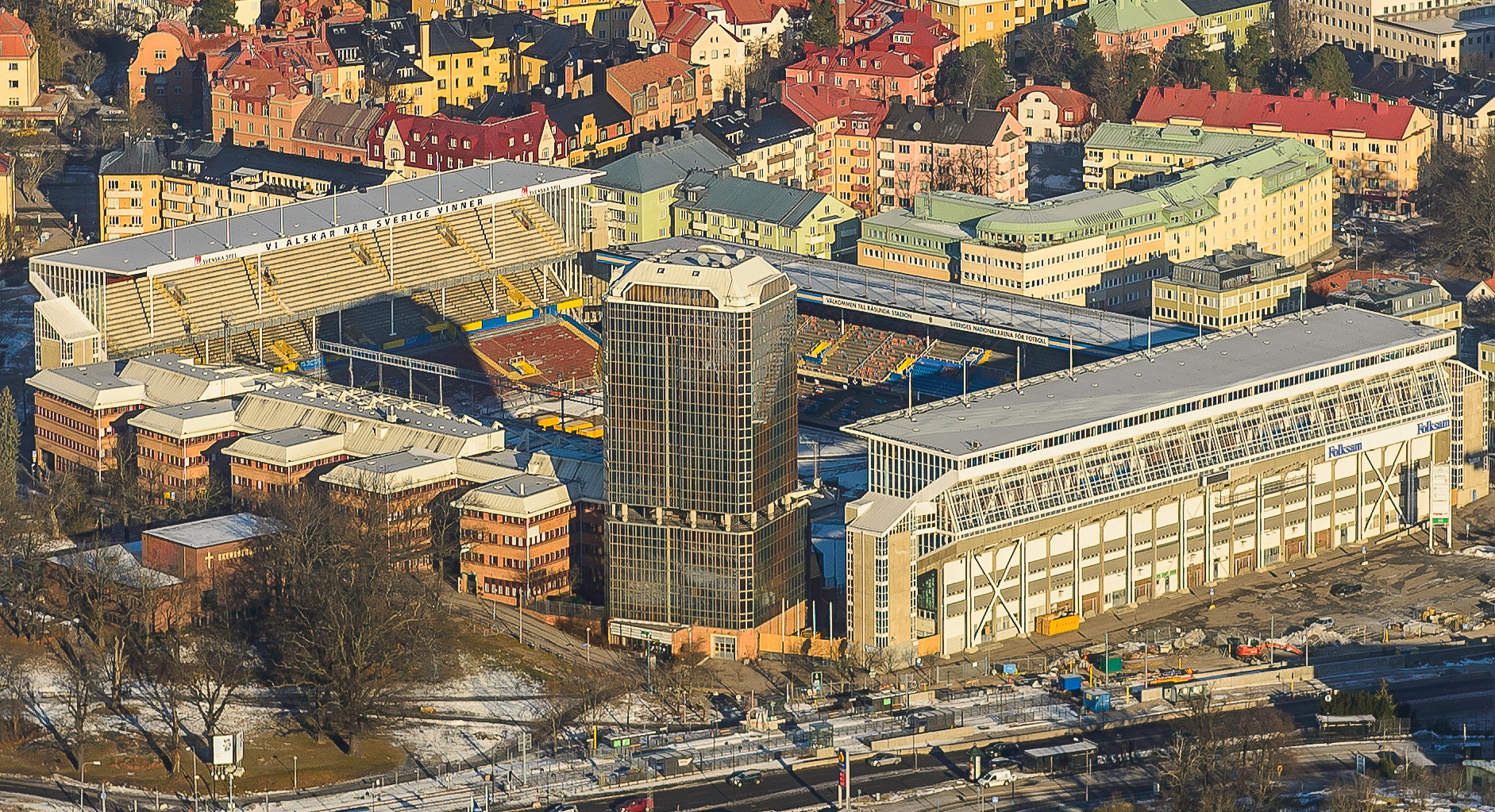
Råsunda Stadium

The 1944 Svenska Cupen was the fourth season of the main Swedish football Cup. The competition was concluded on 1 October 1944 with the final, held at Råsunda Stadium, Solna in Stockholms län. Malmö FF won 4–3 against IFK Norrköping (after extra time) before an attendance of 35,087 spectators.

== Preliminary round 1 ==
Tie no	Home team	Score	Away team	Attendance
1	Ludvika FfI (D2)	1–2 (aet)	Surahammars IF (D3)	785

For other results see SFS-Bolletinen - Matcher i Svenska Cupen.

== Preliminary round 2 ==
Tie no	Home team	Score	Away team	Attendance
1	IF Friska Viljor (N)	0–1	Surahammars IF (D3)	1,749

For other results see SFS-Bolletinen - Matcher i Svenska Cupen.

== First round ==
Tie no	Home team	Score	Away team	Attendance
1	Surahammars IF (D3)	3–1	Västerås IK (D2)	891

For other results see SFS-Bolletinen - Matcher i Svenska Cupen.

== Second round ==
The 8 matches in this round were played on 16 July 1944.

Tie no	Home team	Score	Away team	Attendance
1	GAIS (A)	2–0	Surahammars IF (D3)	2,659
2	Halmstads BK (A)	1–4	IFK Göteborg (A)	3,517
3	Helsingborgs IF (A)	2–1	Degerfors IF (A)	4,162
4	IF Elfsborg (A)	4–3	IS Halmia (A)	3,500
5	Karlskoga IF (D2)	1–1 (by lots)	IFK Eskilstuna (D2)	2,000
6	Malmö FF (A)	8–0	Landskrona BoIS (D2)	5,364
7	Åtvidabergs FF (D2)	0–4	IFK Norrköping (A)	1,350
8	Örebro SK (D2)	0–2	AIK (A)	6,106

== Quarter-finals ==
The 4 matches in this round were played on 23 July 1944.

Tie no	Home team	Score	Away team	Attendance
1	AIK (A)	1-5	Malmö FF (A)	15,122
2	IFK Göteborg (A)	1–2 (aet)	IF Elfsborg (A)	6,629
3	Helsingborgs IF (A)	4–2	Karlskoga IF (D2)	4,132
4	IFK Norrköping (A)	4–2	GAIS (A)	4,157

== Semi-finals ==
The semi-finals in this round were played on 27 August 1944.

Tie no	Home team	Score	Away team	Attendance
1	IF Elfsborg (A)	1–2	IFK Norrköping (A)	4,914
2	Malmö FF (A)	6–0	Helsingborgs IF (D2)	10,882

== Final ==
The final was played on 1 October 1944 at the Råsunda Stadium.

Tie no	Team 1	Score	Team 2	Attendance
1	Malmö FF (A)	4–3 (aet)	IFK Norrköping (A)	35,087
