= 1945 Svenska Cupen =

Tournament details
- Country: Sweden
- Teams: 48

Final positions
- Champions: IFK Norrköping
- Runners-up: Malmö FF

Tournament statistics
- Matches played: 47

The 1945 Svenska Cupen was the fifth season of the main Swedish football Cup. The competition was concluded on 26 August 1945 with the final, held at Råsunda Stadium, Solna in Stockholms län. IFK Norrköping won 4–1 against Malmö FF before an attendance of 31,896 spectators.

== Preliminary round 1 ==
For results see SFS-Bolletinen - Matcher i Svenska Cupen.

== Preliminary round 2 ==
Tie no	Home team	Score	Away team	Attendance
1	Västerås IK (D3)	2–1	Sandvikens IF (D2)	1,798

For other results see SFS-Bolletinen - Matcher i Svenska Cupen.

== First round ==
Tie no	Home team	Score	Away team	Attendance
1	Bodens BK (N)	2–2 (aet) (by lots)	Västerås IK (D3)	2,460

For other results see SFS-Bolletinen - Matcher i Svenska Cupen.

== Second round ==
The 8 matches in this round were played on 8 July 1945.

Tie no	Home team	Score	Away team	Attendance
1	AIK (A)	2–1	Halmstads BK (A)	5,766
2	IF Elfsborg (A)	3–2 (aet)	Ludvika FfI (A)	2,000
3	IFK Göteborg (A)	5–1	Landskrona BoIS (A)	3,160
4	IS Halmia (A)	5–1	Nybro IF (D2)	1,704
5	Helsingborgs IF (A)	5–2	GAIS (A)	4,563
6	Malmö FF (A)	3–0	Surahammars IF (D2)	8,446
7	IFK Norrköping (A)	2–1	Degerfors IF (A)	3,717
8	Västerås IK (D3)	5–7 (aet)	Reymersholms IK (D2)	2,350

== Quarter-finals ==
The 4 matches in this round were played on 15 July 1945.

Tie no	Home team	Score	Away team	Attendance
1	Helsingborgs IF (A)	2–3	IF Elfsborg (A)	5,580
2	IS Halmia (A)	3–4	IFK Norrköping (A)	3,473
3	Malmö FF (A)	4–0	AIK (A)	10,922
4	Reymersholms IK (D2)	1–3	IFK Göteborg (A)	4,680

== Semi-finals ==
The semi-finals in this round were played on 22 July 1945.

Tie no	Home team	Score	Away team	Attendance
1	IF Elfsborg (A)	1–2	Malmö FF (A)	5,938
2	IFK Norrköping (A)	7–2	IFK Göteborg (A)	13,898

== Final ==
The final was played on 26 August 1945 at the Råsunda Stadium.

Tie no	Team 1	Score	Team 2	Attendance
1	IFK Norrköping (A)	4–1	Malmö FF (A)	31,896
