= 1949 Svenska Cupen =

Tournament details
- Country: Sweden
- Teams: 32

Final positions
- Champions: AIK
- Runners-up: Landskrona BoIS

Tournament statistics
- Matches played: 32

The 1949 Svenska Cupen was the ninth season of the main Swedish football Cup. The competition was concluded on 24 July 1949 with the final, held at Råsunda Stadium, Solna in Stockholms län. AIK won 1–0 against Landskrona BoIS before an attendance of 14,718 spectators.

== Preliminary round ==
For results see SFS-Bolletinen - Matcher i Svenska Cupen.

== First round ==
Tie no	Home team	Score	Away team	Attendance
1	Ludvika FfI (D2)	1–4 (aet)	IF Elfsborg (A)	2,101

For other results see SFS-Bolletinen - Matcher i Svenska Cupen.

== Second round ==
The 8 matches in this round were played between 3 July 1949.

Tie no	Home team	Score	Away team	Attendance
1	AIK (A)	6–1	Djurgårdens IF (D2)	11,997
2	BK Kenty (D3)	2–1 (aet)	Ljusne AIK (D3)	1,325
3	Helsingborgs IF (A)	1–4	Landskrona BoIS (A)	7,465
4	IF Elfsborg (A)	5–3	Älvsjö AIK (WC)	2,376
5	IF Friska Viljor (N)	1–0	Kramfors IF (N)	2,000
6	IF Viken (D3)	1–5	Råå IF (D2)	1,800
7	Tidaholms GIF (D2)	2–5	IFK Norrköping (A)	3,100
8	Örgryte IS (D2)	2–3 (aet)	Malmö FF (A)	5,625

== Quarter-finals ==
The 4 matches in this round were played on 10 July 1949 and a replay on 15 July 1949.

Tie no	Home team	Score	Away team	Attendance
1	IF Friska Viljor (N)	3–4 (aet)	BK Kenty (D3)	2,000
2	Landskrona BoIS (A)	3–1	Råå IF (D2)	4,283
3	Malmö FF (A)	0–1	IF Elfsborg (A)	8,797
4	IFK Norrköping (A)	2–2	AIK (A)	4,249
replay	AIK (A)	2–1	IFK Norrköping (A)	11,673

== Semi-finals ==
The semi-finals in this round were played on 17 July 1949.

Tie no	Home team	Score	Away team	Attendance
1	BK Kenty (D3)	2–7	Landskrona BoIS (A)	3,178
2	IF Elfsborg (A)	1–2	AIK (A)	6,700

== Final ==
The final was played on 24 July 1949 at the Råsunda Stadium.

Tie no	Team 1	Score	Team 2	Attendance
1	AIK (A)	1–0	Landskrona BoIS (A)	14,718
