= 1988–89 Svenska Cupen =

Tournament details
- Country: Sweden

Final positions
- Champions: Malmö FF
- Runners-up: Djurgårdens IF

The 1988–89 Svenska Cupen was the 34th season of the main Swedish football Cup. The competition started in 1988 and concluded in 1989 with the final, held at Råsunda Stadium, Solna. Malmö FF won the final 3–0 against Djurgårdens IF.
