= 1967 Svenska Cupen =

Tournament details
- Country: Sweden

Final positions
- Champions: Malmö FF
- Runners-up: IFK Norrköping

The 1967 Svenska Cupen was the 13th season of the main Swedish football Cup. The competition was concluded on 1 November 1967 with the final, held at Idrottsparken, Norrköping. Malmö FF won 2–0 against IFK Norrköping before an attendance of 11,707 spectators.

== First qualifying round ==
For all results see SFS-Bolletinen - Matcher i Svenska Cupen.

== Second qualifying round ==
For all results see SFS-Bolletinen - Matcher i Svenska Cupen.

== First round ==
For all results see SFS-Bolletinen - Matcher i Svenska Cupen.

== Second round ==
For all results see SFS-Bolletinen - Matcher i Svenska Cupen.

== Third round ==
For all results see SFS-Bolletinen - Matcher i Svenska Cupen.

== Fourth round ==
For all results see SFS-Bolletinen - Matcher i Svenska Cupen.

== Quarter-finals ==
The 4 matches in this round were played between 31 August and 20 September 1967.

| Tie no | Home team | Score | Away team | Attendance |
|---|---|---|---|---|
| 1 | IFK Trelleborg (D1) | 1–2 | Malmö FF (A) | 2,231 |
| 2 | Örebro SK (A) | 5–1 | GAIS (A) | 2,242 |
| 3 | IF Elfsborg (A) | 3–1 | Örgryte IS (A) | 3,691 |
| 4 | IFK Norrköping (A) | 1–0 | IK Sirius (D1) | 3,170 |

== Semi-finals ==
The semi-finals in this round were played on 28 September 1967.

| Tie no | Home team | Score | Away team | Attendance |
|---|---|---|---|---|
| 1 | IF Elfsborg (A) | 0–3 | IFK Norrköping (A) | 7,289 |
| 2 | Örebro SK (A) | 1–2 | Malmö FF (A) | 5,508 |

== Final ==
The final was played on 1 November 1967 at Idrottsparken.

| Tie no | Team 1 | Score | Team 2 | Attendance |
|---|---|---|---|---|
| 1 | IFK Norrköping (A) | 0–2 | Malmö FF (A) | 11,707 |
