= 1996–97 Svenska Cupen =

Tournament details
- Country: Sweden
- Teams: 554

Final positions
- Champions: AIK
- Runners-up: IF Elfsborg

Tournament statistics
- Matches played: 553

The 1996–97 Svenska Cupen was the 42nd season of the main Swedish football Cup. The competition was concluded on 29 May 1997 with the final held in Borås. AIK won 2–1 against IF Elfsborg before an attendance of 9,547 spectators. Group matches introduced in the previous year's competition were abandoned and Division 4 clubs again entered the competition in large numbers.

== Preliminary round 1 ==
Tie no	Home team	Score	Away team	Attendance
1	Heds IF (WC)	2–6	IK Sturehov (D4)	

For other results see SFS-Bolletinen - Matcher i Svenska Cupen.

== Preliminary round 2 ==
Tie no	Home team	Score	Away team	Attendance
1	IK Sturehov (D4)	4–2	Skogstorps GoIF (D4)	

For other results see SFS-Bolletinen - Matcher i Svenska Cupen.

== First round ==
22 August 1996	Delsbo IF	1 – 14	Djurgårdens IF

Tie no	Home team	Score	Away team	Attendance
1	Eskilstuna Södra FF (D4)	1–2	IK Sturehov (D4)	

For other results see SFS-Bolletinen - Matcher i Svenska Cupen.

== Second round ==
25 September 1996	Piteå IF	v	Djurgårdens IF

Tie no	Home team	Score	Away team	Attendance
1	IK Sturehov (D4)	1–0 (gg)	Gideonsbergs IF (D3)	

For other results see SFS-Bolletinen - Matcher i Svenska Cupen.

== Third round ==
Tie no	Home team	Score	Away team	Attendance
1	IK Sturehov (D4)	2–1 (gg)	Hertzöga BK (D1)	400

For other results see SFS-Bolletinen - Matcher i Svenska Cupen.

== Fourth round ==
Tie no	Home team	Score	Away team	Attendance
1	IK Sturehov (D4)	1–5	AIK (A)	1,148

For other results see SFS-Bolletinen - Matcher i Svenska Cupen.

== Fifth round ==
The 8 matches in this round were played between 10 April and 24 April 1997.

Tie no	Home team	Score	Away team	Attendance
1	Kalmar FF (D1)	0–1	IF Elfsborg (D1)	423
2	AIK (A)	3–0	IFK Norrköping (A)	2,244
3	IFK Karlshamn (D2)	1–7	Hammarby IF (D1)	1,200
4	Örgryte IS (A)	2–0	Mjällby AIF (D1)	331
5	Kalmar AIK (D2)	3–2 (gg)	BK Häcken (D1)	221
6	Gefle IF (D1)	0–0 (p. 4–2)	IFK Göteborg (A)	4,726
7	Umeå FC (A)	0–0 (p. 3–5)	Örebro SK (A)	1,514
8	Spårvägens FF (D1)	0–0 (p. 4–5)	Motala AIF (D1)	38

== Quarter-finals ==
The 4 matches in this round were played on 8 May 1997.

Tie no	Home team	Score	Away team	Attendance
1	Hammarby IF (D1)	0–2	AIK (A)	8,543
2	Gefle IF (D1)	2–1	Örebro SK (A)	3,512
3	Kalmar AIK (D2)	1–6	Örgryte IS (A)	815
4	IF Elfsborg (D1)	2–0	Motala AIF (D1)	971

== Semi-finals ==
The semi-finals were played on 15 May 1997.

Tie no	Home team	Score	Away team	Attendance
1	Örgryte IS (A)	0–0 (p. 5–6)	AIK (A)	1,215
2	IF Elfsborg (D1)	3–0	Gefle IF (D1)	1,510

== Final ==
The final was played on 29 May 1997 in Borås.

Tie no	Team 1	Score	Team 2	Attendance
1	IF Elfsborg (D1)	1–2	AIK (A)	9,547
