= Svenska Cupen =

Swedish football tournament

- Founded: 1941; 85 years ago
- Region: Sweden
- Teams: 96
- Qualifier for: UEFA Europa League
- Current champions: Mjällby (1st title)
- Most championships: Malmö FF (16 titles)
- Broadcaster: C More
- Website: svenskfotboll.se/cupen
- 2025–26 Svenska Cupen

Svenska cupen (Swedish pronunciation: [ˈsvɛ̂nːska ˈkɵ̌pːɛn], lit. 'the Swedish cup'), also known as the Swedish Cup in English, is a knockout cup competition in Swedish football and the main Swedish football cup. Svenska cupen usually refers to the men's tournament, although a women's tournament is also held. Each year 96 teams compete, comprising the 16 teams from Allsvenskan and the 16 teams of Superettan together with 64 teams from lower tiers of the league system. The winners qualify for the qualifying stages of the UEFA Europa League. The winner is awarded the Gustaf VI Adolf cup.

Svenska cupen was first held in 1941. The current holders of the cup are Mjällby who beat Hammarby in the 2026 final. Malmö FF are the most successful club of the competition having won 16 titles, the latest in 2024.

== Rounds and teams ==
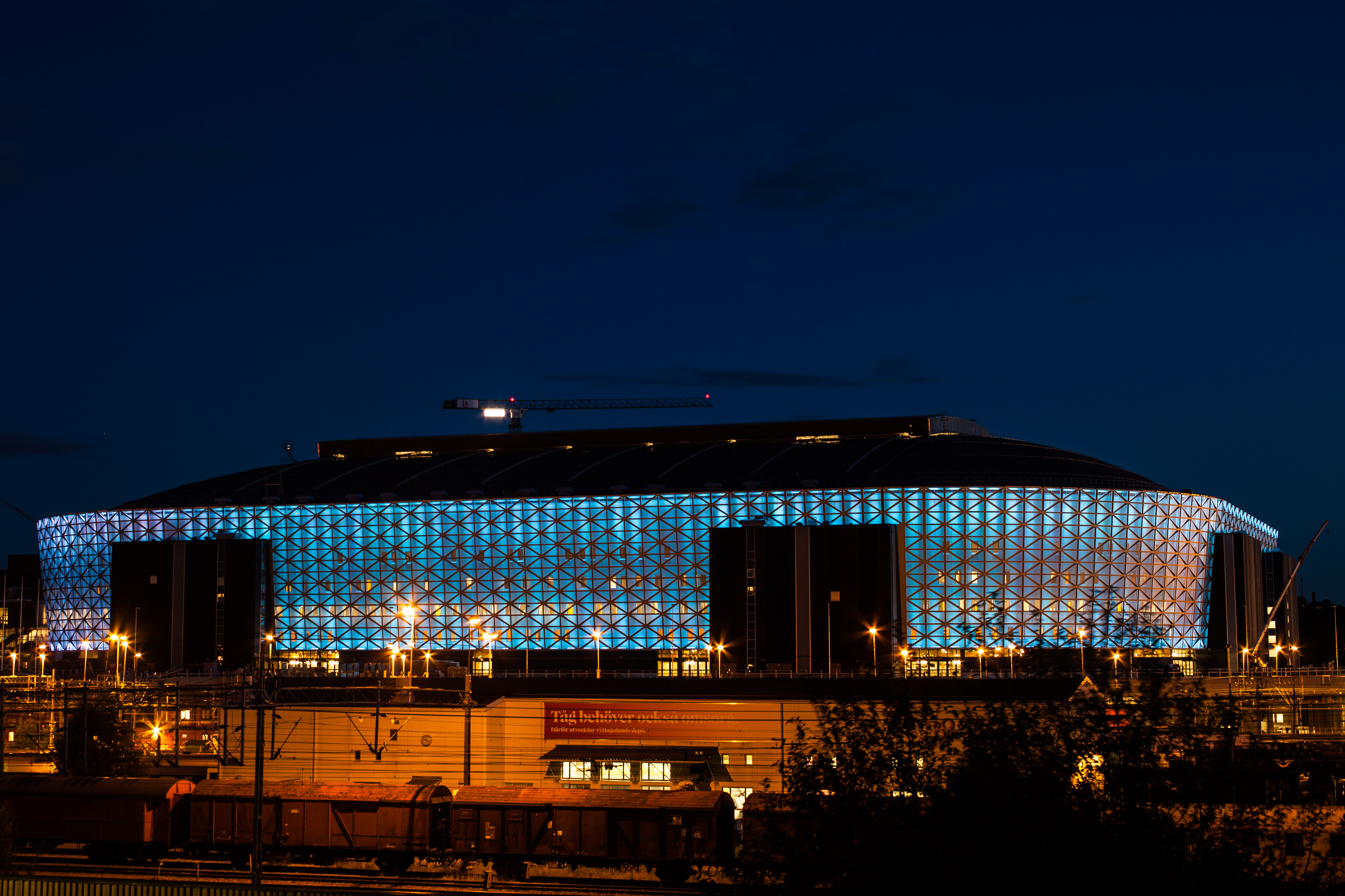
Friends Arena, Solna - venue for the 2013 and 2014 Svenska cupen finals

Round	Clubs remaining	Clubs involved	Winners from previous round	New entries this round	Leagues entering at this round
Round 1	96	64	none	64	64 teams from Division 1 and lower.
Round 2	64	64	32	32	Allsvenskan; Superettan
Group stage	32	32	32	none	none
Quarter-finals	8	8	8	none	none
Semi-finals	4	4	4	none	none
Final	2	2	2	none	none

The winner of Svenska Cupen qualifies for the first qualification round of the UEFA Europa League. The qualification spot is awarded to the fourth positioned team in Allsvenskan if the winner is already qualified for the UEFA Europa League or the UEFA Champions League.

== How district teams qualify ==
There are a number of districts in the Swedish football organization, and each of them receives a number of spots in Svenska Cupen, due to how many eleven-player teams and nine-player teams the district has in the leagues. The only three associations of the Swedish District Football Associations that has a qualifying round to 2015–16 Svenska Cupen are Dalarnas FF and Örebro Läns FF, the other district decides their teams by Distriktsmästerskap (District Championships) or by club ranking 2014. Only teams in Division 1 or lower are included, because teams in Allsvenskan and Superettan are automatically qualified for Round 2.

=== Ranking ===
This is the number of places each of the districts will have in the first round of the 2015–16 Svenska Cupen. Updated as of 31 May 2015.

Rank	Association	Teams
1	Stockholm	10
2	Skåne	9
3	Småland	7
4	Västergötland	6
5	Göteborg	5
6	Halland	3
6	Uppland	3
6	Östergötland	3
9	Södermanland	2
9	Värmland	2
12	Blekinge	1
12	Bohuslän	1

Rank	Association	Teams
12	Dalarna	1
12	Dalsland	1
12	Gestrikland	1
12	Gotland	1
12	Hälsingland	1
12	Jämtland-Härjedalen	1
12	Medelpad	1
12	Norrbotten	1
12	Västerbotten	1
12	Västmanland	1
12	Ångermanland	1
12	Örebro Län	1

== Winners ==
Total cup wins by club
Club	Winners	Runners-up	Cup-winning years	Years as runners-up
Malmö FF	16	7	1944, 1946, 1947, 1951, 1953, 1967, 1972–73, 1973–74, 1974–75, 1977–78, 1979–80, 1983–84, 1985–86, 1988–89, 2021–22, 2023–24	1945, 1970–71, 1995–96, 2015–16, 2017–18, 2019–20, 2024–25
AIK	8	8	1949, 1950, 1975–76, 1984–85, 1995–96, 1996–97, 1998–99, 2009	1943, 1947, 1968–69, 1991, 1994–95, 1999–2000, 2000–01, 2002
IFK Göteborg	8	5	1978–79, 1981–82, 1982–83, 1991, 2008, 2012–13, 2014–15, 2019–20	1985–86, 1998–99, 2004, 2007, 2009
IFK Norrköping	6	5	1943, 1945, 1968–69, 1987–88, 1990–91, 1993–94	1944, 1953, 1967, 1971–72, 2016–17
Djurgårdens IF	5	5	1989–90, 2002, 2004, 2005, 2017–18	1951, 1974–75, 1988–89, 2012–13, 2023–24
Helsingborgs IF	5	3	1941, 1997–98, 2006, 2010, 2011	1950, 1993–94, 2013–14
BK Häcken	4	2	2015–16, 2018–19, 2022–23, 2024–25	1989–90, 2020–21
Kalmar FF	3	3	1980–81, 1986–87, 2007	1977–78, 2008, 2011
IF Elfsborg	3	3	2000–01, 2003, 2013–14	1942, 1980–81, 1996–97
Åtvidabergs FF	2	4	1969–70, 1970–71	1946, 1972–73, 1978–79, 2005
Hammarby IF	1	5	2020–21	1976–77, 1982–83, 2010, 2021–22, 2025–26
Landskrona BoIS	1	4	1971–72	1949, 1975–76, 1983–84, 1992–93
Östers IF	1	4	1976–77	1973–74, 1981–82, 1984–85, 1990–91
GAIS	1	1	1942	1986–87
Örgryte IS	1	1	1999–2000	1997–98
Mjällby AIF	1	1	2025–26	2022–23
Råå IF	1	–	1948	–
Degerfors IF	1	–	1992–93	–
Halmstads BK	1	–	1994–95	–
Östersunds FK	1	–	2016–17	–
Örebro SK	–	2	–	1987–88, 2014–15
IK Sleipner	–	1	–	1941
BK Kenty	–	1	–	1948
Sandvikens IF	–	1	–	1969–70
IK Brage	–	1	–	1979–80
Assyriska FF	–	1	–	2003
Gefle IF	–	1	–	2006
AFC Eskilstuna	–	1	–	2018–19

== Broadcasting rights ==
Turner Sports has previously been the rights holder of the Swedish Cup in the United States.
