= Sandviks IK =

Swedish football club

- Full name: Sandviks Idrottsklubb
- Founded: 1905
- Ground: Sandviks IP; Holmsund; Sweden
- Chairman: Ingemar Strandberg
- Head coach: Jörgen Brännström
- League: Division 2 Norrland
- 2019: Division 2 Norrland, 12th (Relegation Playoffs - Relegated)
| Home colours | Away colours |

Sandviks IK is a Swedish sports club located in Holmsund.

== Background ==
The club was formed on 7 July 1905 and is currently active in the sports of football, handball, swimming, modern pentathlon, running and cross country. Past activities that can be traced in the club's history include triathlon, gymnastics, bandy, wrestling, hockey, table tennis, cycling, walking, boxing and figure skating.

Since their foundation Sandviks IK has participated mainly in the middle and lower divisions of the Swedish football league system. The club currently plays in Division 2 Norrland which is the fourth tier of Swedish football. They play their home matches at the Sandviks IP in Holmsund.

Sandviks IK are affiliated to Västerbottens Fotbollförbund. The club was runner-up in the Norrländska Mästerskapet in 1937.

== Season to season ==
| Season | Level | Division | Section | Position | Movements |
|---|---|---|---|---|---|
| 1998 | Tier 5 | Division 4 | Västerbotten Södra | 3rd | |
| 1999 | Tier 5 | Division 4 | Västerbotten Södra | 6th | |
| 2000 | Tier 5 | Division 4 | Västerbotten Södra | 6th | |
| 2001 | Tier 5 | Division 4 | Västerbotten Södra | 9th | |
| 2002 | Tier 5 | Division 4 | Västerbotten Södra | 1st | Promoted |
| 2003 | Tier 4 | Division 3 | Mellersta Norrland | 11th | Relegated |
| 2004 | Tier 5 | Division 4 | Västerbotten Södra | 6th | |
| 2005 | Tier 5 | Division 4 | Västerbotten Södra | 3rd | |
| 2006* | Tier 6 | Division 4 | Västerbotten Södra | 2nd | Promotion Playoffs |
| 2007 | Tier 6 | Division 4 | Västerbotten Södra | 5th | |
| 2008 | Tier 6 | Division 4 | Västerbotten Södra | 9th | |
| 2009 | Tier 6 | Division 4 | Västerbotten Södra Vår | 12th | |
| 2009 | Tier 6 | Division 4 | VästerbottenHöstfyran | 5th | |
| 2010 | Tier 6 | Division 4 | Västerbotten Södra | 1st | Promoted |
| 2011 | Tier 5 | Division 3 | Mellersta Norrland | 12th | Relegation |
| 2012 | Tier 6 | Division 4 | Västerbotten Södra | 1st | Promoted |
| 2013 | Tier 5 | Division 3 | Mellersta Norrland | 2nd | Promoted |
| 2014 | Tier 4 | Division 2 | Norrland | 13th | Relegated |
| 2015 | Tier 5 | Division 3 | Mellersta Norrland | 5th | |
| 2016 | Tier 5 | Division 3 | Mellersta Norrland | 5th | |
| 2017 | Tier 5 | Division 3 | Norra Norrland | 6th | |
| 2018 | Tier 5 | Division 3 | Norra Norrland | 1st | Promoted |
| 2019 | Tier 4 | Division 2 | Norrland | 12th | Relegation Playoffs - Relegated |
| 2020 | Tier 5 | Division 3 | Norra Norrland | 1st | |

* League restructuring in 2006 resulted in a new division being created at Tier 3 and subsequent divisions dropping a level.
