= Ljusne AIK =

Swedish football club

Ljusne AIK FF
- Full name: Ljusne Allmänna Idrottsklubb Fotbollsförening
- Nickname: LAIK
- Ground: Ljusneborg; Ljusne; Sweden
- League: Division 4 Hälsingland
Home colours	Away colours

Ljusne AIK FF is a Swedish football club located in Ljusne.

== Background ==
Ljusne AIK FF currently plays in Division 4 Hälsingland which is the sixth tier of Swedish football. They play their home matches at the Ljusneborg in Ljusne.

The club is affiliated to Hälsinglands Fotbollförbund. In 1946–47 Ljusne AIK won the Norrländska Mästerskapet. They were also runners-up in this competition in 1931–32 and 1949–50.

== Season to season ==
In their most successful period Ljusne AIK FF competed in the following divisions:

Season	Level	Division	Section	Position	Movements
1928–29	Tier 3	Division 3	Uppsvenska	4th	
1929–30	Tier 3	Division 3	Uppsvenska	6th	
1930–31	Tier 3	Division 3	Uppsvenska	3rd	
1931–32	Tier 3	Division 3	Uppsvenska	5th	
1932–33	Tier 3	Division 3	Uppsvenska	1st	Promoted
1933–34	Tier 2	Division 2	Norra	6th	
1934–35	Tier 2	Division 2	Norra	5th	
1935–36	Tier 2	Division 2	Norra	8th	
1936–37	Tier 2	Division 2	Norra	2nd	
1937–38	Tier 2	Division 2	Norra	5th	
1938–39	Tier 2	Division 2	Norra	4th	
1939–40	Tier 2	Division 2	Norra	9th	Relegated
1940–41	Tier 3	Division 3	Uppsvenska Sydöstra	1st	Promoted
1941–42	Tier 2	Division 2	Norra	9th	Relegated
1942–43	Tier 3	Division 3	Uppsvenska Sydöstra	1st	Promoted
1943–44	Tier 2	Division 2	Norra	5th	
1944–45	Tier 2	Division 2	Norra	8th	
1945–46	Tier 2	Division 2	Norra	9th	Relegated
1946–47	Tier 3	Division 3	Uppsvenska Sydöstra		Promotion Playoffs
1947–48	Tier 3	Division 3	Norra	7th	
1948–49	Tier 3	Division 3	Norra	10th	Relegated
1949–50	Tier 4	Division 4	Hälsingland		Promoted
1950–51	Tier 3	Division 3	Norra	4th	
1951–52	Tier 3	Division 3	Norra	7th	
1952–53	Tier 3	Division 3	Norra	6th	Promoted
1953–54	Tier 2	Division 2	Norrland	2nd	
1954–55	Tier 2	Division 2	Norrland	5th	
1955–56	Tier 2	Division 2	Norrland	7th	
1956–57	Tier 2	Division 2	Norrland	10th	Relegated
1957–58	Tier 3	Division 3	Södra Norrland	5th	
1959	Tier 3	Division 3	Södra Norrland	12th	Relegated
1960	Tier 4	Division 4	Hälsingland	2nd	Promoted
1961	Tier 3	Division 3	Södra Norrland	10th	
1962	Tier 3	Division 3	Södra Norrland	10th	Relegated
1963	Tier 4	Division 4	Hälsingland	2nd	Promoted
1964	Tier 3	Division 3	Södra Norrland Nedre	7th	
1965	Tier 3	Division 3	Södra Norrland Nedre	8th	
1966	Tier 3	Division 3	Södra Norrland Nedre	9th	Relegated
1967	Tier 4	Division 4	Hälsingland	3rd	

In recent seasons Ljusne AIK FF have competed in the following divisions:

Season	Level	Division	Section	Position	Movements
2006*	Tier 7	Division 5	Hälsingland	1st	Promoted
2007	Tier 6	Division 4	Hälsingland	3rd	
2008	Tier 6	Division 4	Hälsingland	6th	
2009	Tier 6	Division 4	Hälsingland	5th	
2010	Tier 6	Division 4	Hälsingland	2nd	Promotion Playoffs
2011	Tier 6	Division 4	Hälsingland		

* League restructuring in 2006 resulted in a new division being created at Tier 3 and subsequent divisions dropping a level.
