= BK Kenty =

Swedish football club

- Full name: Bollklubben Kenty
- Founded: 1932
- Ground: Fredriksbergs IP; Linköping; Sweden
- Capacity: 1,000
- Chairman: Anders Lorentzon
- League: Division 6 Östergötland Mellersta
- 2018: Division 6 Östergötland Mellersta, 3rd
Home colours	Away colours

BK Kenty is a Swedish sports club located in Linköping.

== Background ==
Bollklubben Kenty was formed on 10 April 1932 by John Schön, Gösta Dahlqvist, Enar Johansson and Folke Dättermark – all teenagers. The Kenty name has its origins in kid's interest at that time in reading Cowboy and Indian books. A few letters in the name Kentucky were changed and hence the name Kenty was born.

Initially the club operated as a youth club before men's and boys' football became the club's main activity. In 1968 BK Kenty women's football was added. Other sports that the club ran included ice hockey, bandy, tennis, bowling and handball before these sections were transferred to other clubs.

BK Kenty has participated mainly in the middle and lower divisions of the Swedish football league system. The club currently plays in Division 2 Östra Götaland which is the fourth tier of Swedish football. They play their home matches at the Fredriksbergs IP in Linköping.

BK Kenty are affiliated to the Östergötlands Fotbollförbund.

== Season to season ==
Season	Level	Division	Section	Position	Movements
1993	Tier 5	Division 4	Östergötland Västra	4th	
1994	Tier 5	Division 4	Östergötland Västra	4th	
1995	Tier 5	Division 4	Östergötland Västra	6th	
1996	Tier 5	Division 4	Östergötland Västra	3rd	
1997	Tier 5	Division 4	Östergötland Västra	2nd	Promotion Playoffs
1998	Tier 5	Division 4	Östergötland Västra	2nd	Promotion Playoffs – Promoted
1999	Tier 4	Division 3	Nordöstra Götaland	4th	
2000	Tier 4	Division 3	Nordöstra Götaland	8th	
2001	Tier 4	Division 3	Nordöstra Götaland	12th	Relegated
2002	Tier 5	Division 4	Östergötland Östra	5th	
2003	Tier 5	Division 4	Östergötland Västra	5th	
2004	Tier 5	Division 4	Östergötland Västra	8th	
2005	Tier 5	Division 4	Östergötland Västra	2nd	Promotion Playoffs – Promoted
2006*	Tier 5	Division 3	Nordöstra Götaland	2nd	Promotion Playoffs – Promoted
2007	Tier 4	Division 2	Mellersta Götaland	7th	
2008	Tier 4	Division 2	Östra Götaland	5th	
2009	Tier 4	Division 2	Östra Götaland	9th	
2010	Tier 4	Division 2	Östra Götaland	2nd	
2011	Tier 4	Division 2	Södra Svealand	12th	Relegated
2012	Tier 5	Division 3	Nordöstra Götaland	8th	
2018	Tier 8	Division 6	Östergötland Mellersta	3rd	

* League restructuring in 2006 resulted in a new division being created at Tier 3 and subsequent divisions dropping a level.
