= 1912 Svenska Mästerskapet final =

- Event: 1912 Svenska Mästerskapet
Djurgårdens IF	Örgryte IS

Final
Djurgårdens IF	Örgryte IS
0	0
- Date: 13 October 1912
- Venue: Stockholm Olympic Stadium, Stockholm
- Referee: Ruben Gelbord, Stockholm
- Attendance: 7,000

Replay
Djurgårdens IF	Örgryte IS
2	2
- Date: 10 November 1912
- Venue: Walhalla IP, Gothenburg
- Referee: Paulus Sjöblom, Stockholm
- Attendance: 2,280

Replay
Örgryte IS	Djurgårdens IF
1	3
- Date: 17 November 1912
- Venue: Råsunda IP, Solna
- Referee: Oscar Thulin, Gothenburg
- Attendance: 5,000

The 1912 Svenska Mästerskapet final was played on 13 October 1912, 10 November 1912, and 17 November 1912 between the fifth-time finalists Djurgårdens IF and the twelfth-time finalists Örgryte IS. The match decided the winner of 1912 Svenska Mästerskapet, the football cup to determine the Swedish champions. Djurgårdens IF won their first title with a 3–1 victory in the second replay, played at Råsunda IP in Solna.

== Route to the final ==
=== Djurgårdens IF ===
Djurgårdens IF's route to the final
	Opponent	Result
PR	IFK Stockholm (H)	1–1
PR	IFK Stockholm (A, replay)	1–0
QF	Sandvikens AIK (A)	2–1
SF	IFK Eskilstuna (H)	4–0

On the way to the final, Djurgården had beaten IFK Stockholm in the preliminary round. Djurgården drew IFK Stockholm 1–1 at home on 18 August 1912, and won the away-game replay, 1–0, on 25 August 1912. In the quarter-final on 1 September 1912, Djurgården beat Sandvikens AIK away with 2–1 in Gävle. The semi-final against IFK Eskilstuna at home ended with a Djurgården win, 4–0, on 22 September 1912.

Djurgården made their fifth Svenska Mästerskapet final after having lost in all their four previous appearances, the 1904, 1906 and 1909 finals to final opponents Örgryte IS, and the 1910 final to IFK Göteborg.

=== Örgryte IS ===
Örgryte IS's route to the final
	Opponent	Result
2QR	Göteborgs FF (H)	w.o.
PR	Helsingborgs IF (A)	3–3
PR	Helsingborgs IF (H, replay)	5–2
QF	IFK Göteborg (H)	4–2
SF	AIK (H)	1–0

Örgryte IS entered in second qualifying round and won their second qualifying round match against Göteborgs FF on walkover. In the preliminary round, Örgryte won against Helsingborgs IF in the replay match after a 3–3 away-game draw, the replay at home ended 5–2. The first match was played 18 August 1912 in Helsingborg and the replay one week later on 25 August 1912 in Gothenburg. Fellow Gothenburg team IFK Göteborg was the opponent of the quarter-finals, which ended in a 4–2 win to Örgryte on 1 September 1912. Örgryte then won the semi-final against AIK with 1–0 at home in Gothenburg on 22 September 1912.

Örgryte made their twelfth appearance in a Svenska Mästerskapet final, having won ten, including three against final opponents Djurgården in 1904, 1906 and 1909, lost one, and only missed five.

== Final matches ==
=== Final ===
==== Summary ====
The final on 13 October 1912 ended in a goalless draw.

==== Details ====
13 October 1912

Djurgårdens IF	0–0	Örgryte IS

Stockholm Olympic Stadium, Stockholm
Attendance: 7,000
Referee: Ruben Gelbord, Stockholm

GK	(Sweden) Gustaf Dahlberg
DF	(Sweden) Götrik Frykman
DF	(Sweden) Gösta Backlund
MF	(Sweden) Victor Jansson
MF	(Sweden) Ragnar Wicksell
MF	(Sweden) Gösta Karlsson
FW	(Sweden) Ivar Friberg
FW	(Sweden) Einar Olsson
FW	(Sweden) Bertil Nordenskjöld
FW	(Sweden) Karl Öhman
FW	(Sweden) Jean Söderberg

GK	(Sweden) Oskar Bengtsson
DF	(Sweden) Jacob Levin
DF	(Sweden) Erik Bergström
MF	(Sweden) Fridolf Pettersson
MF	(Sweden) Gustaf Sandberg
MF	(Sweden) Berner Pettersson
FW	(Sweden) William Hagard
FW	(Sweden) Herman Myhrberg
FW	(Sweden) Einar Johansson
FW	(Sweden) Josef Appelgren
FW	(Sweden) Gunnar Lundin

=== 1st replay ===
==== Summary ====
The first replay on 10 November 1912 ended in a 2–2 draw after an equaliser in the 85th minute by Djurgården's Jean Söderberg. For the match, Djurgården was joined by forwards Richard Werner and Valdemar Johannison from IF Olympia.

==== Details ====
10 November 1912

Örgryte IS	2–2	Djurgårdens IF
Appelgren 48'; Lundin 75' (pen.)		Nordenskjöld 27'; Söderberg 85'

Walhalla IP, Gothenburg
Attendance: 2,280
Referee: Paulus Sjöblom, Stockholm

GK	(Sweden) Oskar Bengtsson
DF	(Sweden) Jacob Levin
DF	(Sweden) Erik Bergström
MF	(Sweden) Fridolf Pettersson
MF	(Sweden) Gustaf Sandberg
MF	(Sweden) Berner Pettersson
FW	(Sweden) Herman Myhrberg
FW	(Sweden) Einar Johansson
FW	(Sweden) Josef Appelgren
FW	(Sweden) William Hagard
FW	(Sweden) Gunnar Lundin

GK	(Sweden) Gustaf Dahlberg
DF	(Sweden) Götrik Frykman
DF	(Sweden) Gösta Backlund
MF	(Sweden) Gösta Karlsson
MF	(Sweden) Ragnar Wicksell
MF	(Sweden) Karl Öhman
FW	(Sweden) Victor Jansson
FW	(Sweden) Richard Werner
FW	(Sweden) Bertil Nordenskjöld
FW	(Sweden) Valdemar Johannison
FW	(Sweden) Jean Söderberg

=== 2nd replay ===
==== Summary ====
Djurgården won the second replay 3–1 after goals by Bertil Nordenskjöld and Einar Olsson and an own goal by Örgryte's Erik Bergström. On the field at Råsunda IP, which was frozen and slippery, Nordenskjöld scored the first goal from 25 metres, while Örgryte equalised through Myrberg. In the second half, Olsson scored Djurgården's second goal after goalkeeper Bergström had lost the control of the ball, and the third came when the goalkeeper misjudged a kick that made the ball go into the net.

==== Details ====
17 November 1912

Djurgårdens IF	3–1	Örgryte IS
Nordenskjöld 30'; Olsson 70'; Bergström 85' (o.g.)		Myhrberg 32'

Råsunda IP, Solna
Attendance: 5,000
Referee: Oscar Thulin, Gothenburg

GK	(Sweden) Gustaf Dahlberg
DF	(Sweden) Gösta Backlund
DF	(Sweden) Götrik Frykman
MF	(Sweden) Gösta Karlsson
MF	(Sweden) Ragnar Wicksell
MF	(Sweden) Karl Öhman
FW	(Sweden) Victor Jansson
FW	(Sweden) Einar Olsson
FW	(Sweden) Bertil Nordenskjöld
FW	(Sweden) Valdemar Johannison
FW	(Sweden) Jean Söderberg

GK	(Sweden) Oskar Bengtsson
DF	(Sweden) Jacob Levin
DF	(Sweden) Erik Bergström
MF	(Sweden) Fridolf Pettersson
MF	(Sweden) Gustaf Sandberg
MF	(Sweden) Berner Pettersson
FW	(Sweden) William Hagard
FW	(Sweden) Herman Myhrberg
FW	(Sweden) Einar Johansson
FW	(Sweden) Josef Appelgren
FW	(Sweden) Gunnar Lundin
