= 1913 Svenska Mästerskapet final =

- Event: 1913 Svenska Mästerskapet
Örgryte IS	Djurgårdens IF
3	2
- Date: 2 November 1913
- Venue: Walhalla IP, Gothenburg
- Referee: Karl Emil Holm, Stockholm
- Attendance: 5,033

The 1913 Svenska Mästerskapet final was played on 2 November 1913 between the thirteenth-time finalists Örgryte IS and the sixth-time finalists Djurgårdens IF. The match decided the winner of 1913 Svenska Mästerskapet, the football cup to determine the Swedish champions. Örgryte IS won their eleventh title with a 3–2 victory at Walhalla IP in Gothenburg.

== Route to the final ==
=== Örgryte IS ===
Örgryte IS's route to the final
	Opponent	Result
PR	GAIS (H)	7–2
QF	Westermalms IF (H)	5–0
SF	AIK (H)	1–1
SF	AIK (A, replay)	1–1
SF	AIK (A, replay)	5–1

Örgryte IS entered in the preliminary round and won 7–2 against GAIS at home on 1 August 1913. On 24 August 1913, Örgryte IS beat Westermalms IF in the quarter-final at home in Gothenburg, 5–0. The semi-final against AIK on 21 September 1913 home in Gothenburg ended in a 1–1 draw. The away-game replay in Stockholm on 28 September 1913, ended in a new draw, again 1–1. On 19 October 1913, Örgryte IS played the second replay against AIK, this time winning the away-game in Stockholm, 5–1.

Örgryte made their thirteenth appearance in a Svenska Mästerskapet final, having won eleven, including three against final opponents Djurgården in 1904, 1906 and 1909, and lost two, including the previous final to Djurgården.

=== Djurgårdens IF ===
Djurgårdens IF's route to the final
	Opponent	Result
PR	Köpings IS (H)	4–2
QF	IFK Uppsala (H)	2–1
SF	Johanneshovs IF (H)	5–1

Djurgårdens IF entered in the preliminary round on 3 August 1913, where they won, 4–2, against Köpings IS at home in Stockholm. On 24 August 1913, Djurgården won the quarter-final against IFK Uppsala, 2–1 at home. In the semi-final on 21 September 1913, Djurgården beat Johanneshovs IF, 5–1, at home.

Djurgården made their sixth Svenska Mästerskapet final and were reigning champions by winning the previous final against final opponents Örgryte IS, but had also lost to Örgryte on three occasions: in 1904, 1906 and 1909.

== Match details ==
2 November 1913

Örgryte IS	3–2	Djurgårdens IF
Appelgren 15'; Kristiansson 22' (pen.); Nordenskjöld 48' (o.g.)		Karlstrand 1'; Öhman 40'

Walhalla IP, Gothenburg
Attendance: 5,033
Referee: Karl Emil Holm, Stockholm

GK	(Sweden) Oskar Bengtsson
DF	(Sweden) Nelz H. Peterzéns
DF	(Sweden) Erik Bergström
MF	(Sweden) William Hagard
MF	(Sweden) Regis Palmers
MF	(Sweden) Fridolf Pettersson
FW	(Sweden) Herman Myhrberg
FW	(Sweden) Einar Johansson
FW	(Sweden) Albert Kristiansson
FW	(Sweden) Josef Appelgren
FW	(Sweden) Gösta Clark

GK	(Sweden) Karl Runn
DF	(Sweden) Einar Hemming
DF	(Sweden) Gösta Backlund
MF	(Sweden) Bertil Nordenskjöld
MF	(Sweden) Götrik Frykman
MF	(Sweden) Gösta Karlsson
FW	(Sweden) Victor Jansson
FW	(Sweden) Einar Olsson
FW	(Sweden) Melcher Johansson
FW	(Sweden) Karl Öhman
FW	(Sweden) Karl Karlstrand
