= 1915 Svenska Mästerskapet final =

- Event: 1915 Svenska Mästerskapet
Djurgårdens IF	Örgryte IS
4	1
- Date: 17 October 1915
- Venue: Stockholm Olympic Stadium, Stockholm
- Referee: Ruben Gelbord, Stockholm
- Attendance: 10,000

The 1915 Svenska Mästerskapet Final was played on 17 October 1915 between the seventh-time finalists Djurgårdens IF and the fourteenth-time finalists Örgryte IS. The match decided the winner of 1915 Svenska Mästerskapet, the football cup to determine the Swedish champions. Djurgårdens IF won their second title with a 4–1 victory at Stockholm Olympic Stadium in Stockholm.

== Route to the final ==
=== Djurgårdens IF ===
Djurgårdens IF's route to the final
	Opponent	Result
1QR	IF Swithiod (H)	5–0
2QR	IK Sirius (H)	2–0
PR	IFK Stockholm (H)	7–0
QF	Helsingborgs IF (H)	0–0
QF	Helsingborgs IF (A, replay)	2–2
QF	Helsingborgs IF (H, replay)	2–1
SF	AIK (H)	2–1

Djurgårdens IF entered in the first qualifying round against IF Swithiod on 30 June 1915 and won, 5–0, at home in Stockholm. On 18 July 1915, Djurgården played IK Sirius at home in the second qualifying round and won, 2–0. In the preliminary round, Djurgården beat IFK Stockholm 7–0, at home on 8 August 1915. For the quarter-final, Djurgården was drawn against Helsingborgs IF, and played a goalless draw on 5 September 1915 at home, resulting in an away-game replay on 12 September 1915 in Helsingborg, who again ended in a draw, this time 2–2, and a second replay at home on 26 September 1915, ending in 2–1 win for Djurgården. On 3 October 1915, Djurgården won against AIK at home in the semi-final with 2–1.

Djurgårdens IF made their seventh appearance in a Svenska Mästerskapet final, having won one, against final opponents Örgryte IS in 1912, and lost five, including four to final opponents Örgryte, in 1904, 1906, 1909 and 1913.

=== Örgryte IS ===
Örgryte IS's route to the final
	Opponent	Result
PR	IS Halmia (A)	3–1
QF	Westermalms IF (H)	5–1
SF	IFK Eskilstuna (H)	4–0

Örgryte IS entered the tournament in the preliminary round with a 3–1 away-game win against IS Halmia of Halmstad on 8 August 1915. On 5 September 1915, Örgryte IS beat Westermalms IF, 5–1, in the quarter-final at home in Gothenburg. In the semi-final, Örgryte IS was drawn against IFK Eskilstuna and won 4–0 at home on 3 October 1915.

Örgryte made their fourteenth appearance in a Svenska Mästerskapet final, having won 13, including four against final opponents Djurgården in 1904, 1906, 1909 and 1913, and lost two, including the previous final to Djurgården.

== Match details ==
17 October 1915

Djurgårdens IF	4–1	Örgryte IS
Karlstrand 7'; G. Johansson 25'; Nordenskjöld; Söderberg 75'		Kristiansson 24'

Stockholm Olympic Stadium, Stockholm
Attendance: 10,000
Referee: Ruben Gelbord, Stockholm

GK	(Sweden) Karl Runn
DF	(Sweden) Melcher Johansson
DF	(Sweden) Ragnar Wicksell
MF	(Sweden) Bertil Nordenskjöld
MF	(Sweden) Götrik Frykman
MF	(Sweden) Victor Jansson
FW	(Sweden) Gottfrid Johansson
FW	(Sweden) Einar Olsson
FW	(Sweden) Karl Schlaaf
FW	(Sweden) Sten Söderberg
FW	(Sweden) Karl Karlstrand

GK	(Sweden) Oskar Bengtsson
DF	(Sweden) Albert Andersson
DF	(Sweden) Regis Palmers
MF	(Sweden) Ernst Eliasson
MF	(Sweden) Sven Friberg
MF	(Sweden) William Hagard
FW	(Sweden) Harry Mangusson
FW	(Sweden) Albert Kristiansson
FW	(Sweden) Arvid Fagrell
FW	(Sweden) Josef Appelgren
FW	(Sweden) Gösta Clark
