= 1910 Svenska Mästerskapet final =

- Event: 1910 Svenska Mästerskapet
IFK Göteborg	Djurgårdens IF
3	0
- Date: 16 October 1910
- Venue: Walhalla IP, Gothenburg
- Referee: Ruben Gelbord, Stockholm
- Attendance: 5,510

The 1910 Svenska Mästerskapet final was played on 16 October 1910 between the second-time finalists IFK Göteborg and the four-time finalists Djurgårdens IF. The match decided the winner of 1910 Svenska Mästerskapet, the football cup to determine the Swedish champions. IFK Göteborg won their second title with a 3–0 victory.

== Route to the final ==
=== IFK Göteborg ===
IFK Göteborg's route to the final
	Opponent	Result
PR	Rantens IF (H)	10–1
QF	Helsingborgs IF (A)	6–1
SF	IFK Norrköping (H)	7–1

In the preliminary round, IFK Göteborg was drawn against Rantens IF. The match on 21 August 1910 was abandoned at 3–1, and continued one week later, on 28 August 1910, where IFK Göteborg won 10–1 in Gothenburg. On 4 September 1910, IFK Göteborg beat Helsingborgs IF, 6–1, in the away-game quarter-final in Helsingborg. IFK Göteborg played a Kamratmöte semi-final against IFK Norrköping at home in Gothenburg on 25 September 1910 and won, 7–1.

IFK Göteborg made their second appearance in a Svenska Mästerskapet final, having won their previous in 1908.

=== Djurgårdens IF ===
Djurgårdens IF's route to the final
	Opponent	Result
PR	Örgryte IS (A)	2–0
QF	IFK Uppsala (H)	2–0
SF	IFK Köping (H)	4–0

On 21 August 1910, Djurgårdens entered the preliminary round with a 2–0 away-game win against Örgryte IS in Gothenburg. Djurgården then won the quarter-final against IFK Uppsala at home in Stockholm with 2–0 on 4 September 1910. On 25 September 1910, Djurgården beat IFK Köping in the semi-final at home, 4–0.

Djurgården made their fourth Svenska Mästerskapet final after having lost in all their three previous appearances, the 1904, 1906 and 1909 finals to Örgryte IS.

== Match details ==
16 October 1910

IFK Göteborg	3–0	Djurgårdens IF
Börjesson 51', 52', 86'

Walhalla IP, Gothenburg
Attendance: 5,510
Referee: Ruben Gelbord, Stockholm

IFK Göteborg	Djurgårdens IF

GK	(Sweden) Erik Alstam
DF	(Sweden) Nils Andersson
DF	(Sweden) Henning Svensson
MF	(Sweden) John Olsson
MF	(Sweden) Gustaf Sandberg
MF	(Sweden) Konrad Törnqvist
FW	(Sweden) Gustaf Magnusson
FW	(Sweden) Carl Ohlsson
FW	(Sweden) Erik Börjesson
FW	(Sweden) Harry Hellberg
FW	(Sweden) Arthur Lundin

GK	(Sweden) Gösta Sahlin
DF	(Sweden) Knut Sandlund
DF	(Sweden) Erik Lavass
MF	(Sweden) Bertil Nordenskjöld
MF	(Sweden) Götrik Frykman
MF	(Sweden) Ernst Engdahl
FW	(Sweden) Victor Jansson
FW	(Sweden) Einar Olsson
FW	(Sweden) Ivar Friberg
FW	(Sweden) Karl Öhman
FW	(Sweden) Samuel Lindqvist
