= 1909 Svenska Mästerskapet final =

- Event: 1909 Svenska Mästerskapet
Örgryte IS	Djurgårdens IF
8	2
- Date: 17 October 1909
- Venue: Walhalla IP, Gothenburg
- Referee: 5,888
- Attendance: Ruben Gelbord, Stockholm

The 1909 Svenska Mästerskapet final was played on 17 October 1909 between the eleventh-time finalists Örgryte IS and the third-time finalists Djurgårdens IF. The match decided the winner of 1909 Svenska Mästerskapet, the football cup to determine the Swedish champions. Örgryte IS won their tenth title with a 8–2 victory at Walhalla IP in Gothenburg.

== Route to the final ==
=== Örgryte IS ===
Örgryte IS's route to the final
	Opponent	Result
PR	IFK Stockholm (H)	6–4
QF	IFK Göteborg (H)	3–1
SF	IFK Uppsala (H)	5–1

On their way to the final, Örgryte IS beat three kamratföreningar. On 29 August 1909, Örgryte won in the preliminary round against IFK Stockholm with 6–4 at home in Gothenburg. In the quarter-final Örgryte IS beat IFK Göteborg, 3–1, at home on 26 September 1909. On 10 October 1909 Örgryte won the semi-final against IFK Uppsala with 5–1 also at home.

Örgryte made their eleventh appearance in a Svenska Mästerskapet final, having won nine, including two against final opponents Djurgården in 1904 and 1906, lost one, and only missed three.

=== Djurgårdens IF ===
Djurgårdens IF's route to the final
	Opponent	Result
PR	IFK Eskilstuna (A)	5–0
QF	AIK (H)	3–0
SF	IFK Norrköping (H)	6–0

Djurgårdens IF managed to get to the Svenska Mästerskapet final without conceding a single goal. On 12 September 1909, Djurgården won the away-game preliminary round, 5–0, against IFK Eskilstuna. 3–0 ended the quarter-final against AIK at home in Stockholm on 26 September 1909. On 10 October 1909, Djurgården beat IFK Norrköping, 6–0, at home in the semi-final.

Djurgården made their third Svenska Mästerskapet final after having lost in both their previous appearances, the 1904 and 1906 finals to final opponents Örgryte IS.

== Match details ==
17 October 1909

Örgryte IS	8–2	Djurgårdens IF
Olsson 46'; E. Bergström 47', 63', 67'; Myhrberg 52', ?'; H. Bergström 68' own goal 73'		Sandlund 17' unknown (pen.)

Walhalla IP, Gothenburg
Attendance: 5,888
Referee: Ruben Gelbord, Stockholm

GK	(Sweden) Oskar Bengtsson
DF	(Sweden) David Asklund
DF	(Sweden) Jacob Levin
MF	(Sweden) Thor Eriksson
MF	(Sweden) Ivar Ryberg
MF	(Sweden) Sven Olsson
FW	(Sweden) Gustaf Bergström
FW	(Sweden) Herman Myhrberg
FW	(Sweden) Erik Bergström
FW	(Sweden) Axel Englund
FW	(Sweden) Henrik Bergström

GK	(Sweden) Gustaf Dahlberg
DF	(Sweden) Knut Sandlund
DF	(Sweden) Erik Lavass
MF	(Sweden) Bertil Nordenskjöld
MF	(Sweden) Götrik Frykman
MF	(Sweden) Ernst Engdahl
FW	(Sweden) Victor Jansson
FW	(Sweden) Einar Olsson
FW	(Sweden) Ivar Friberg
FW	(Sweden) Karl Öhman
FW	(Sweden) Samuel Lindqvist
