= 1912 Svenska Mästerskapet =

Tournament details
- Country: Sweden

Final positions
- Champions: Djurgårdens IF
- Runners-up: Örgryte IS

Tournament statistics
- Matches played: 29
- Goals scored: 123 (4.24 per match)

The 1912 Svenska Mästerskapet was the 17th season of Svenska Mästerskapet, the football cup to determine the Swedish champions. Djurgårdens IF won the tournament by defeating Örgryte IS in the final with a 3–1 score.

== Qualifying rounds ==
=== First qualifying round ===
Team 1	Score	Team 2
GAIS	2–1	IK Wega
Jonsereds GoIF (w.o.)	—	IFK Karlstad
IF Heimdal	2–1	Uppsala Studenters IF

=== Second qualifying round ===
Team 1	Score	Team 2
Örgryte IS	—	Göteborgs FF (w.o.)
IFK Göteborg	10–1	IFK Karlstad
Helsingborgs IF	2–0	GAIS
IF Svea	1–2	Köpings IS
IK Sleipner	1–1	IFK Västerås
Sandvikens AIK	8–2	IF Heimdal
Gefle IF	4–0	IFK Gävle
Johanneshovs IF	2–1 (Note: abandoned)	Mariebergs IK
Johanneshovs IF	0–3	Mariebergs IK
Replays
IFK Västerås	4–1	IK Sleipner

== Main tournament ==
=== Preliminary round ===
Team 1	Score	Team 2
AIK	10–0	Köpings IS
Djurgårdens IF	1–1	IFK Stockholm
IFK Eskilstuna	4–1	IFK Västerås
IFK Göteborg	3–0	IFK Malmö
IFK Norrköping	0–1	Mariebergs IK
Gefle IF	1–3	Sandvikens AIK
IFK Uppsala	1–3	Westermalms IF
Helsingborgs IF	3–3	Örgryte IS
Replays
IFK Stockholm	0–1	Djurgårdens IF
Örgryte IS	5–2	Helsingborgs IF

=== Quarter-finals ===
Team 1	Score	Team 2
AIK	2–0	Mariebergs IK
Sandvikens AIK	1–2	Djurgårdens IF
Westermalms IF	1–6	IFK Eskilstuna
Örgryte IS	4–2	IFK Göteborg

=== Semi-finals ===
Team 1	Score	Team 2
Djurgårdens IF	4–0	IFK Eskilstuna
Örgryte IS	1–0	AIK

=== Final ===
13 October 1912

Djurgårdens IF	0–0	Örgryte IS

Stockholm Olympic Stadium, Stockholm
Attendance: 7,000
Referee: Ruben Gelbord, Stockholm
10 November 1912
Replay

Örgryte IS	2–2	Djurgårdens IF
Appelgren 48'; Lundin 75' (pen.)		Nordenskjöld 27'; Söderberg 85'

Walhalla IP, Gothenburg
Attendance: 2,280
Referee: Paulus Sjöblom, Stockholm
17 November 1912
Replay

Djurgårdens IF	3–1	Örgryte IS
Nordenskjöld 30'; Olsson 70'; Bergström 85' (o.g.)		Myhrberg 32'

Råsunda IP, Solna
Attendance: 5,000
Referee: Oscar Thulin, Gothenburg
