= 1910 in Swedish football =

The 1910 season in Swedish football, starting January 1910 and ending December 1910:

== Honours ==
=== Official titles ===
Title	Team	Reason
Swedish Champions 1910	IFK Göteborg	Winners of Svenska Mästerskapet

=== Competitions ===
Level	Competition	Team
1st level	1910 Svenska Serien	Örgryte IS
Regional league	Stockholmsserien klass I 1910	Djurgårdens IF
Regional league	Stockholmsserien klass II 1910	Södermalms IK
Championship Cup	Svenska Mästerskapet 1910	IFK Göteborg
Cup competition	Corinthian Bowl 1910	Djurgårdens IF
Cup competition	Kamratmästerskapen 1910	IFK Göteborg
Cup competition	Wicanderska Välgörenhetsskölden 1910	Djurgårdens IF

== Promotions, relegations and qualifications ==
=== Promotions ===
Promoted from	Promoted to	Team	Reason
Unknown	1911–12 Svenska Serien	Djurgårdens IF	Unknown
Unknown	Mellansvenska Serien 1911–12	Eriksdals IF	Unknown
Unknown	Mellansvenska Serien 1911–12	Köpings IS	Unknown
Unknown	Mellansvenska Serien 1911–12	IF Svea	Unknown
Unknown	Mellansvenska Serien 1911–12	IFK Uppsala	Unknown
Unknown	Mellansvenska Serien 1911–12	Verdandi VoIF	Unknown
Unknown	Mellansvenska Serien 1911–12	IFK Västerås	Unknown
Unknown	Mellansvenska Serien 1911–12	Westermalms IF	Unknown
Unknown	Mellansvenska Serien 1911–12	Örebro BK	Unknown
Unknown	Västsvenska Serien 1912	IF Elfsborg	Unknown
Unknown	Västsvenska Serien 1912	GAIS	Unknown
Unknown	Västsvenska Serien 1912	Jonsereds GIF	Unknown
Unknown	Västsvenska Serien 1912	Rantens IF	Unknown
Unknown	Västsvenska Serien 1912	IFK Uddevalla	Unknown
Unknown	Västsvenska Serien 1912	IK Wega	Unknown

=== Relegations ===
Relegated from	Relegated to	Team	Reason
Svenska Serien 1910	Unknown	Göteborgs FF	Unknown
Svenska Serien 1910	Unknown	Västmanland-Nerikes BK	Unknown
Stockholmsserien klass I 1910	Unknown	AIK	No Stockholmsserien kl. I next season
Stockholmsserien klass I 1910	Unknown	Djurgårdens IF	No Stockholmsserien kl. I next season
Stockholmsserien klass I 1910	Unknown	Eriksdals IF	No Stockholmsserien kl. I next season
Stockholmsserien klass I 1910	Unknown	Mariebergs IK	No Stockholmsserien kl. I next season
Stockholmsserien klass I 1910	Unknown	Stockholms IF	No Stockholmsserien kl. I next season
Stockholmsserien klass I 1910	Unknown	IFK Stockholm	No Stockholmsserien kl. I next season
Stockholmsserien klass I 1910	Unknown	IFK Uppsala	No Stockholmsserien kl. I next season
Stockholmsserien klass I 1910	Unknown	Westermalms IF	No Stockholmsserien kl. I next season
Stockholmsserien klass II 1910	Unknown	Djurgårdens SK	No Stockholmsser. kl. II next season
Stockholmsserien klass II 1910	Unknown	Haga SK	No Stockholmsser. kl. II next season
Stockholmsserien klass II 1910	Unknown	IK Spurt	No Stockholmsser. kl. II next season
Stockholmsserien klass II 1910	Unknown	Stockholms IS	No Stockholmsser. kl. II next season
Stockholmsserien klass II 1910	Unknown	IF Swithiod	No Stockholmsser. kl. II next season
Stockholmsserien klass II 1910	Unknown	Södermalms IK	No Stockholmsser. kl. II next season
Stockholmsserien klass II 1910	Unknown	Östermalms IF	No Stockholmsser. kl. II next season

== Domestic results ==
=== Svenska Serien 1910 ===
Svenska Serien 1910 clubs

	Team	Pld	W	D	L	GF		GA	GD	Pts
1	Örgryte IS	14	8	3	3	52	–	22	+30	19
2	AIK	14	8	3	3	50	–	28	+22	19
3	IFK Göteborg	14	8	2	4	41	–	32	+9	18
4	IFK Norrköping	14	6	3	5	31	–	26	+5	15
5	Göteborgs FF	14	5	3	6	24	–	24	0	13
6	Vikingarnas FK	14	4	3	7	28	–	38	-10	11
7	Västmanland-Nerikes BK	14	3	3	8	25	–	50	-25	9
8	IFK Eskilstuna	14	3	2	9	30	–	61	-31	8

=== Stockholmsserien klass I 1910 ===
	Team	Pld	W	D	L	GF		GA	GD	Pts
1	Djurgårdens IF	14	10	2	2	35	–	13	+22	22
2	Eriksdals IF	14	6	4	4	20	–	15	+5	16
3	IFK Stockholm	14	6	4	4	14	–	11	+3	16
4	AIK	14	6	4	4	22	–	18	+4	16
5	IFK Uppsala	14	5	4	5	28	–	21	+7	14
6	Westermalms IF	14	5	4	5	17	–	22	-5	14
7	Mariebergs IK	14	4	4	6	19	–	23	-4	12
8	Stockholms IF	14	0	2	12	4	–	36	-32	2

=== Stockholmsserien klass II 1910 ===
	Team	Pld	W	D	L	GF		GA	GD	Pts
1	Södermalms IK	12	9	2	1	19	–	5	+14	20
2	Djurgårdens SK	12	7	4	1	15	–	7	+8	18
3	Östermalms IF	12	4	5	3	16	–	10	+6	13
4	Stockholms IS	12	3	7	2	9	–	5	+4	13
5	IF Swithiod	12	2	7	3	7	–	10	-3	11
6	IK Spurt	12	1	4	7	13	–	31	-28	6
7	Haga SK	12	1	3	8	8	–	16	-8	5

=== Svenska Mästerskapet 1910 ===
Final

October 16, 1910

IFK Göteborg	1–0	Djurgårdens IF

Walhalla IP, Gothenburg

=== Corinthian Bowl 1910 ===
Final

June 5, 1910

Örgryte IS	2–2	Djurgårdens IF

Walhalla IP, Gothenburg
July 3, 1910

Djurgårdens IF	2–1	Örgryte IS

Idrottsparken, Stockholm

=== Kamratmästerskapen 1910 ===
Final

September 18, 1910

IFK Norrköping	4–1	IFK Göteborg

Idrottsparken, Norrköping
September 25, 1910

IFK Göteborg	7–1	IFK Norrköping

Walhalla IP, Gothenburg

=== Wicanderska Välgörenhetsskölden 1910 ===
Final

October 23, 1910

Djurgårdens IF	1–1	Eriksdals IF

Idrottsparken, Stockholm
October 30, 1910

Djurgårdens IF	2–0	Eriksdals IF

Råsunda IP, Solna

== National team results ==
September 11, 1910
Friendly
No. 8

Norway	0–4	Sweden
		Myhrberg 47', 62'; Gustafsson 60', 80'

Gamle Frogner, Kristiania
Attendance: 6,000
Referee: Buchwald (Denmark)

Sweden: Erik Alstam - Erik Lavass, Jacob Levin - Bertil Nordenskjöld, Sixten Öberg, Thor Ericsson - Herman Myhrberg, Sven Landberg, Ivar Friberg, Karl Gustafsson, Samuel Lindqvist.

== National team players in season 1910 ==
name	pos.	caps	goals	club
Erik Alstam	GK	1	0	Göteborgs FF
Thor Ericsson	MF	1	0	Örgryte IS
Ivar Friberg	FW	1	0	Djurgårdens IF
Karl "Köping" Gustafsson	FW	1	2	Köpings IS
Sven Landberg	FW	1	0	IFK Stockholm
Erik Lavass	DF	1	0	Djurgårdens IF
Jacob Levin	DF	1	0	Örgryte IS
Samuel "Sam" Lindqvist	FW	1	0	Djurgårdens IF
Herman Myhrberg	FW	1	2	Örgryte IS
Bertil "Nocke" Nordenskjöld	MF	1	0	Djurgårdens IF
Sixten Öberg	MF	1	0	Mariebergs IK
