= 1908 Svenska Mästerskapet final =

- Event: 1908 Svenska Mästerskapet
IFK Göteborg	IFK Uppsala
4	3
- Date: 11 October 1908
- Venue: Walhalla IP, Gothenburg
- Referee: Ruben Gelbord, Stockholm
- Attendance: 4,500

The 1908 Svenska Mästerskapet final was played on 11 October 1908 between the first-time finalists IFK Göteborg and the second-time finalists IFK Uppsala. The match decided the winner of 1908 Svenska Mästerskapet, the football cup to determine the Swedish champions. IFK Göteborg won their first ever title with a 4–3 victory.

== Route to the final ==
=== IFK Göteborg ===
IFK Göteborg's route to the final
	Opponent	Result
PR	IFK Eskilstuna (A)	5–2
QF	Malmö BoIS (A)	3–3 (a.e.t.)
QF	Malmö BoIS (H, replay)	5–2
SF	IK Sleipner (H)	10–0

IFK Göteborg entered in a preliminary round away-game against IFK Eskilstuna on 23 August 1908 and won, 5–2. On 13 September 1908, IFK Göteborg played an away-game quarter-final in Malmö against Malmö BoIS that ended in a draw 3–3, which also was the result after extra time. The home-game replay one week later, on 20 September 1908, IFK Göteborg won, 5–2. On 4 October 1908, IFK Göteborg played the semi-final against IK Sleipner and won 10–0 at home.

IFK Göteborg made their first Svenska Mästerskapet final.

=== IFK Uppsala ===
IFK Uppsala's route to the final
	Opponent	Result
PR	Sandvikens AIK (A)	3–2
QF	Djurgårdens IF (H)	4–1
SF	IFK Stockholm (A)	3–2 (a.e.t.)

In the preliminary round, IFK Uppsala won the away-game against Sandvikens AIK on 23 August 1908 with 3–2 in Sandviken. IFK Uppsala won the quarter-final against Djurgårdens IF, 4–1, at home on 13 September 1908. On 4 October 1908, IFK Uppsala won the away-game kamratmöte semi-final against IFK Stockholm, 3–2 after extra time.

IFK Uppsala made their second Svenska Mästerskapet final after having lost the previous final to Örgryte IS.

== Match details ==
11 October 1908

IFK Göteborg	4–3	IFK Uppsala
Fagrell 16'; Börjesson 17' (pen.); Lund 35'; Andén 85' (o.g.)		Lindman 0–1; Olsson 20'; Ekbom 44'

Walhalla IP, Gothenburg
Attendance: 4,500
Referee: Ruben Gelbord, Stockholm

IFK Göteborg	IFK Uppsala

GK	(Sweden) Carl Andersson
DF	(Sweden) Konrad Törnkvist
DF	(Sweden) Nils Andersson
MF	(Sweden) John Olsson
MF	(Sweden) Lindorff Andersson
MF	(Sweden) Valter Lindén
FW	(Sweden) Verner Jansson
FW	(Sweden) Erik Lund
FW	(Sweden) Erik Börjesson
FW	(Sweden) Arvid Fagrell
FW	(Sweden) Olof Tell

GK	(Sweden) Enok Eriksson
DF	(Sweden) Emil Wennberg
DF	(Sweden) Nils Andén
MF	(Sweden) Sven Svensson
MF	(Sweden) Hans Lidman
MF	(Sweden) Melcher Sandelin
FW	(Sweden) Sune Almkvist
FW	(Sweden) S. Jansson
FW	(Sweden) Karl Olsson
FW	(Sweden) Herbert Ekbom
FW	(Sweden) Karl Wikström
