= Emke =

Emke is a surname. Notable people with the surname include:

- Georg Emke, Swedish footballer
- Mark Emke (born 1959), Dutch rower

== See also ==
- Enke
