= Leif Nilsson =

Leif Nilsson may refer to:

- Leif Nilsson (footballer) (born 1963), Swedish footballer
- Leif Nilsson (weightlifter) (born 1952), Swedish Olympic weightlifter
