= Carl Jahnzon =

Swedish hammer thrower

Carl Jahnzon (Carl Johan Jahnzon; 29 April 1881 – 25 June 1955) was a Swedish track and field athlete who competed in the 1912 Summer Olympics. In 1912 he finished eighth in the hammer throw competition.

Jahnzon represented Djurgårdens IF. Jahnzon also played football and played the 1904 Svenska Mästerskapet Final with Djurgårdens IF Fotboll, which his team lost to Örgryte IS.
