= Axel Norling =

Swedish athlete (1884–1964)

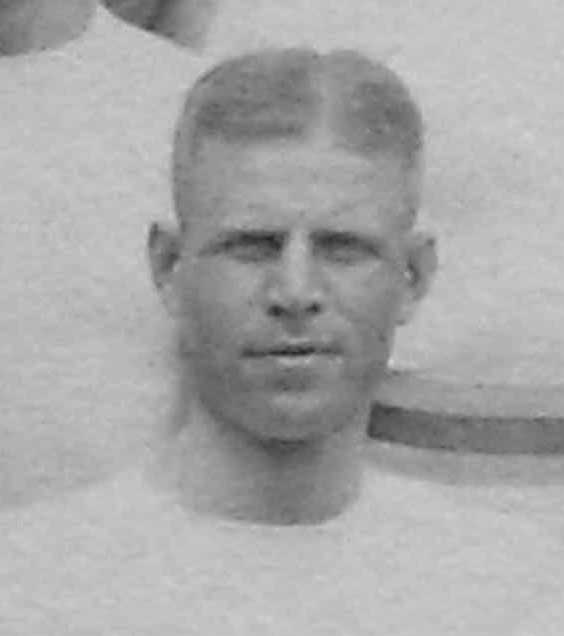
- Norling c. 1910

Personal information
- Full name: Karl Axel Patrik Norling
- Born: 16 April 1884 Stockholm, United Kingdoms of Sweden and Norway
- Died: 7 May 1964 (aged 80) Stockholm, Sweden
- Height: 1.78 m (5 ft 10 in)
- Relatives: Daniel Norling (brother)

Gymnastics career
- Discipline: Men's artistic gymnastics
- Country represented: Sweden
- Club: Djurgårdens IF; Stockholms KK; Kristliga Förening av Unga Mäns Gymnastikavdelningar
Medal record
Representing Sweden
Men's artistic gymnastics
Olympic Games
Gold medal – first place	1908 London	Team
Gold medal – first place	1912 Stockholm	Team, Swedish system
Men's tug of war
Intercalated Games
Bronze medal – third place	1906 Athens	Tug of war

Karl Axel Patrik Norling (16 April 1884 – 7 May 1964) was a Swedish gymnast, diver, and tug of war competitor who participated in the 1906 Intercalated Games and 1908 and 1912 Summer Olympics. He won a bronze medal in the tug of war in 1906, as well as two gold medals with the Swedish gymnastics team, in 1908 and 1912, alongside his younger brother Daniel.

Norling was a member of Djurgårdens IF, which he represented in several sports. He played bandy with Djurgårdens IF Bandy and football with Djurgårdens IF Fotboll, both as a centre-half. For the football team, he played the 1904 and 1906 finals of Svenska Mästerskapet, both times losing to Örgryte IS. As a diver, Norling represented Stockholms KK, and as a gymnast, he represented KFUM GA.

Norling was educated as an engineer and eventually became head of the Navy Department at AB Separator (later Alfa Laval).
