= 1906 Svenska Mästerskapet final =

- Event: 1906 Svenska Mästerskapet
Örgryte IS	Djurgårdens IF
4	3
- Date: 7 October 1906
- Venue: Idrottsparken, Stockholm
- Referee: Herman Juhlin, Stockholm
- Attendance: 3,800

The 1906 Svenska Mästerskapet final was played on 7 October 1906 between the ninth-time finalists Örgryte IS and the second-time finalists Djurgårdens IF. The match decided the winner of 1906 Svenska Mästerskapet, the football cup to determine the Swedish champions. Örgryte IS won their eighth title with a 4–3 victory at Idrottsparken in Stockholm.

== Route to the final ==
=== Örgryte IS ===
Örgryte IS's route to the final
	Opponent	Result
QF	Malmö BK (H)	w.o.
SF	IFK Eskilstuna (H)	3–1

In the quarter-final, Örgryte IS won against Malmö BK on walkover on 9 September 1906. On 23 September 1906, Örgryte played the semi-final against IFK Eskilstuna at home in Gothenburg and won, 3–1.

Örgryte were reigning back to back champions by winning the 1904 and the 1905 finals, the 1904 edition against final opponents Djurgården, and made their ninth appearance in a Svenska Mästerskapet final, having won seven, including the one against final opponents Djurgården, lost one, and only missed two.

=== Djurgårdens IF ===
Djurgårdens IF's route to the final
	Opponent	Result
QF	IFK Norrköping (H)	8–0
SF	Gefle IF (H)	3–2

Djurgårdens IF entered in the quarter-final against IFK Norrköping on 9 September 1906 and won 8–0 at home in Stockholm. On 23 September 1906, Djurgården played the semi-final against Gefle IF and won, 3–2 at home.

Djurgården made their second Svenska Mästerskapet final after having lost to final opponents Örgryte IS in their previous appearance in the 1904 final.

== Match details ==
7 October 1906

Örgryte IS	4–3	Djurgårdens IF
E. Bergström 14' unknown unknown 76'; G. Bergström 90'		Rosén (2); Clausen

Idrottsparken, Stockholm
Attendance: 3,800
Referee: Herman Juhlin, Stockholm

GK	(Sweden) Oskar Bengtsson
DF	(Sweden) Erik Bergström
DF	(Sweden) Folke Borg
MF	(Sweden) Hugo Levin
MF	(Sweden) Ivar Ryberg
MF	(Sweden) Thor Eriksson
FW	(Sweden) Roland Kuhlau
FW	(Sweden) Knut Lindberg
FW	(Sweden) Erik Lund
FW	(Sweden) Josef Larsson
FW	(Sweden) Gustaf Bergström

GK	(Sweden) Gustaf Dahlberg
DF	(Sweden) Axel Käck
DF	(Sweden) Ragnar Dahlstedt
MF	(Sweden) Gösta Clausen
MF	(Sweden) Axel Norling
MF	(Sweden) Birger Möller
FW	(Sweden) Ivar Friberg
FW	(Sweden) Einar Olsson
FW	(Sweden) Wilhelm Rosén
FW	(Sweden) Robert Nordberg
FW	(Sweden) Samuel Lindqvist
