= Balders Hage =

Square in Gothenburg, Sweden

Coordinates: 57°41′36″N 11°59′46″E

Balders Hage was a ballcourt and public square in the centre of Gothenburg, Sweden. The ballcourt was inaugurated on 1 January 1898 but was abandoned in 1909 when Walhalla IP was built. The club Örgryte IS was founded in Balders Hage, and played some of their matches there. Balders Hage is now part of the amusement park Liseberg, and the roller coaster Balder is located where Balders Hage once was.
