= Karl Schlaaf =

Swedish footballer

Senior career*
Years	Team	Apps	(Gls)
- Djurgården
- * Club domestic league appearances and goals

Karl Schlaaf is a Swedish retired footballer. Schlaaf was part of the Djurgården Swedish champions' team of 1915. Schlaaf made 27 Svenska Serien appearances for Djurgården and scored 17 goals.

== Honours ==
=== Club ===
Djurgårdens IF

- Svenska Mästerskapet: 1915
