= Stig Gustafsson =

Swedish footballer (1930–2016)

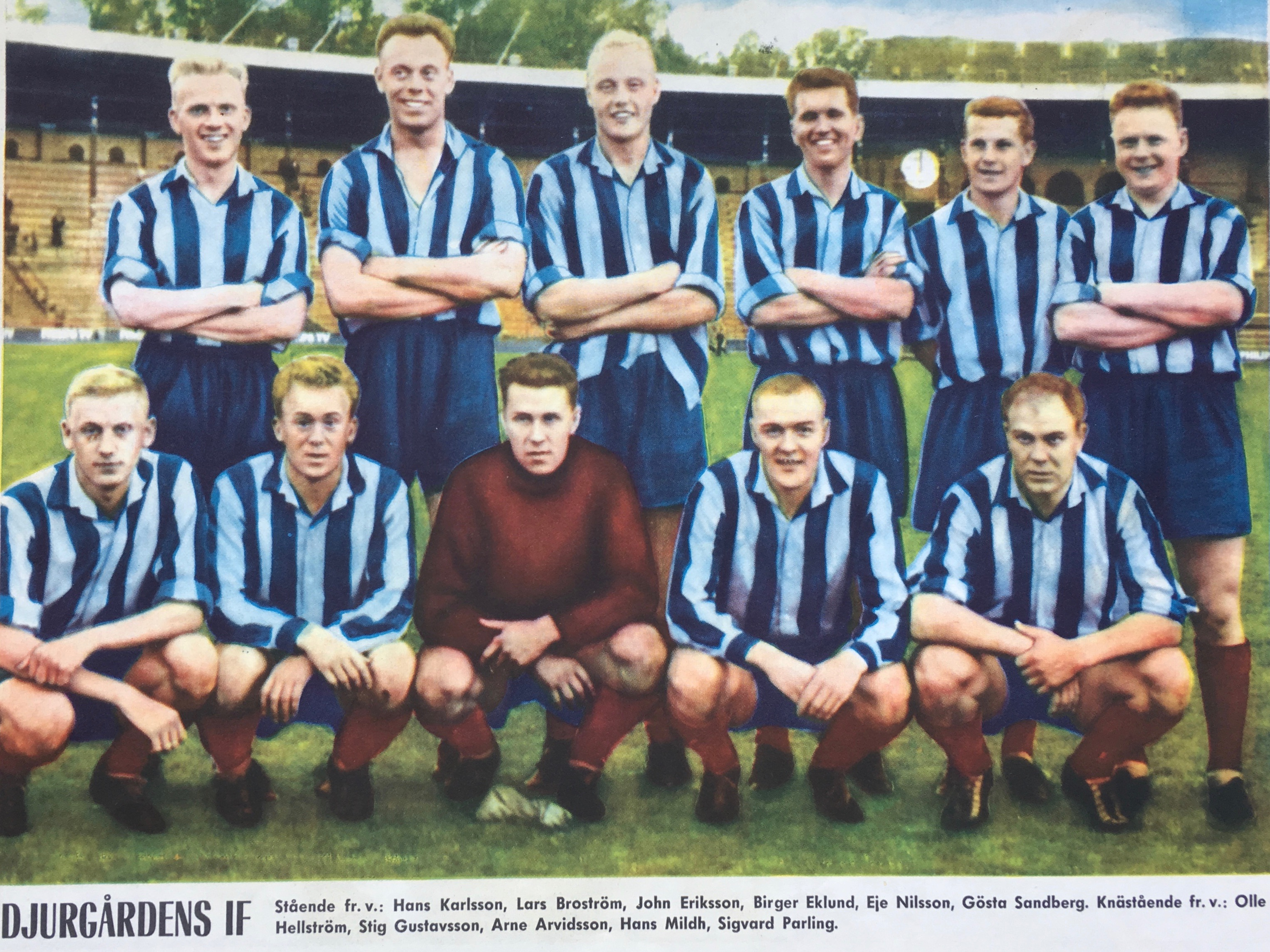
- Djurgårdens IF in 1960 with Stig Gustafsson, second player in the front row.

Personal information
- Date of birth: 5 May 1930
- Date of death: 6 September 2016 (aged 86)
- Position: Defender

Senior career*
Years	Team	Apps	(Gls)
- Djurgårdens IF
- * Club domestic league appearances and goals

Stig Gustafsson (5 May 1930 – 2016) was a Swedish footballer who played as a defender. He made 112 Allsvenskan appearances for Djurgårdens IF. Gustafsson died in 2016.

== Honours ==
Djurgårdens IF

- Allsvenskan: 1959
