= Georg Ehmke =

Swedish footballer

Georg Emke
Personal information
- Date of birth: 16 March 1904
- Date of death: 6 March 1992 (aged 87)

Senior career*
Years	Team	Apps	(Gls)
- Djurgården
- * Club domestic league appearances and goals

Georg Ehmke (16 March 1904 – 6 March 1992) was a Swedish football left winger and athlete in sprints and hurdling.

Ehmke made 18 Allsvenskan appearances for Djurgården in the 1927–28 season and scored 1 goal. He played in Djurgården's first Allsvenskan match against Stattena IF on 31 July 1927 and scored the club's first goal in the league in the second half.

Ehmke also was a sprinter and hurdler for Djurgården, having club records in 100 metres and in 400 metres hurdles.
