= Jean Söderberg =

Swedish bandy player

Personal information
- Date of birth: 1890
- Date of death: 1924 (aged 33–34)

Senior career*
Years	Team	Apps^{†}	(Gls)^{†}
- Djurgården
- * Senior club appearances and goals counted for the domestic league only. † Appearances (Goals).

Jean Söderberg (1890–1924) was a Swedish bandy player and footballer.

Söderberg was part of the Djurgården Swedish champions' team of 1912.

As footballer, Söderberg was part of the Djurgården Swedish champions' team of 1912.

Jean Söderberg's brother Sten Söderberg was a Swedish international and also played for Djurgårdens IF Bandy and Djurgårdens IF Fotboll, while his other brother Herman Söderberg represented Järva IS.

== Honours ==
=== Club ===
Djurgårdens IF

- Svenska Mästerskapet: 1912
