= Gösta Backlund =

Swedish footballer (1893–1918)

Personal information
- Full name: Gösta Backlund
- Date of birth: 10 July 1893
- Date of death: 26 November 1918 (aged 25)
- Position: Left back

Senior career*
| Years | Team | Apps | (Gls) |
| 1911–1918 | Djurgårdens IF | | |

International career
| 1914 | Sweden | 2 | (0) |
- * Club domestic league appearances and goals

Gösta Backlund (10 July 1893 – 26 November 1918) was a Swedish footballer. He made two appearances for Sweden and won one Svenska Mästerskapet with Djurgårdens IF.

== Honours ==
=== Club ===
Djurgårdens IF

- Svenska Mästerskapet: 1912
