= Leif Nilsson (footballer) =

Swedish footballer and coach

Personal information
- Full name: Leif Nilsson
- Date of birth: 10 July 1963 (age 63)
- Position: Forward

Senior career*
Years	Team	Apps	(Gls)
- Hudiksvalls ABK
1984–1992	Djurgårdens IF		
- Vasalunds IF
- Gustavsbergs IF

Managerial career
- Djurgårdens IF (youth coach)
- * Club domestic league appearances and goals

Leif Nilsson (born 10 July 1963) is a Swedish former footballer and coach. He made 124 Allsvenskan appearances for Djurgårdens IF between 1986 and 1992. After his active career, he was in the Djurgårdens IF organisation as youth coach.

== Career ==
Nilsson joined Djurgårdens IF from Hudiksvalls ABK for the 1984 season and played with them until 1992. During his time in Djurgårdens IF, he was part of the 1989–90 Svenska Cupen winning team. He also played for Vasalunds IF and Gustavsbergs IF.

== Honours ==
=== Club ===
Djurgårdens IF

- Division 2 Norra (1): 1985
- Svenska Cupen (1): 1989–90
