= Gösta Karlsson =

Swedish footballer

Senior career*
| Years | Team | Apps | (Gls) |
- Djurgården
- * Club domestic league appearances and goals

Gösta Karlsson is a Swedish retired footballer. Karlsson was part of the Djurgården Swedish champions' team of 1912. Karlsson made 22 Svenska Serien appearances for Djurgården and scored 2 goals.

== Honours ==
=== Club ===
Djurgårdens IF

- Svenska Mästerskapet: 1912
