= Enke =

Enke is a surname. Notable people with the surname include:

- Christie G. Enke, American chemist
- Fred Enke (1897–1985), American football, basketball, and baseball coach
- Fred Enke (American football) (born 1924), American football player
- Hartmut Enke (1952–2005), German musician
- Karin Enke (born 1961), German speed skater
- Konrad Enke (born 1934), German swimmer
- Robert Enke (1977–2009), German football player
- Werner Enke (1941–2026), German actor

== See also ==
- 133552 Itting-Enke (2003 UJ4) is a main-belt asteroid discovered on October 16, 2003, at Turtle Star Observatory
- Den glade enke i Trangvik (English: The merry widow of Trangvik) is a 1927 Norwegian silent drama film directed by Harry Ivarson
