= Ivar Ryberg =

Swedish rower

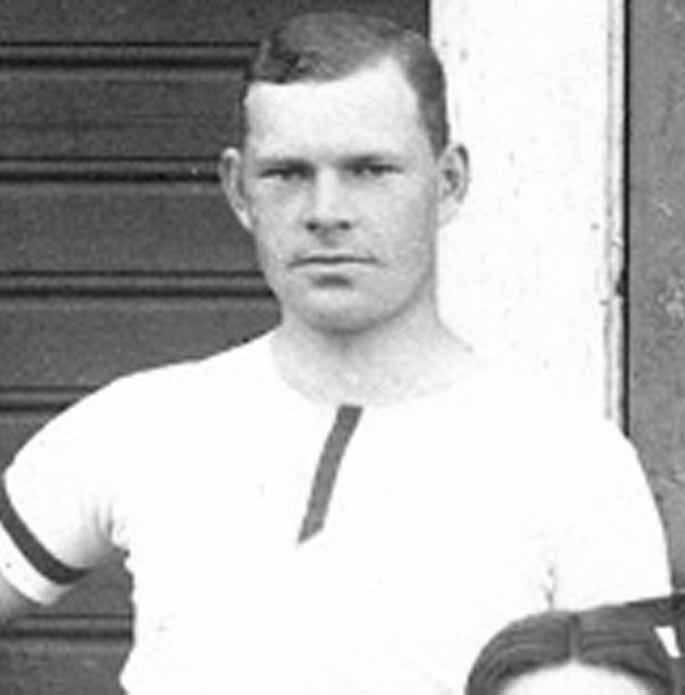

Personal information
- Born: 24 August 1885 Flo Parish, Grästorp, Sweden
- Died: 2 January 1929 (aged 43) Gothenburg, Sweden

Sport
- Sport: Rowing
- Club: Göteborgs RK

Ivar Magnus Ryberg (24 August 1885 – 2 January 1929) was a Swedish rower who competed in the 1912 Summer Olympics. He was a crew member of the Swedish boat Göteborgs that was eliminated in the first round of the men's eight tournament.

Ryberg was also an association football player and won five national titles. He played in the international match Sweden—England (amateurs) in Hull in 1909. In football, Ryberg represented Örgryte IS.

Earlier on, Ryberg lived in Hamburg, where he played football for the two clubs that were to become Hamburger SV. In 1908, he also won the North German discus throwing title, achieving 33.28 m.
