= Arvid Fagrell =

Swedish footballer

Personal information
- Date of birth: 10 August 1888
- Place of birth: Ulricehamn, Sweden
- Date of death: 10 May 1919 (aged 30)
- Place of death: Gothenburg, Sweden
- Position: Forward

Senior career*
Years	Team	Apps	(Gls)
- IFK Göteborg

International career
1908–1912	Sweden	2	(0)
- * Club domestic league appearances and goals

Arvid Fagrell (10 August 1888 – 19 May 1919) was a Swedish football player who competed in the 1908 Summer Olympics.

In the 1908 tournament he was a part of the Swedish football team that finished in 4th place. Fagrell played in Sweden's 2-0 loss against Netherlands. He played for IFK Göteborg his whole career and became Swedish masters with them 1908 and 1910.
