= Victor Jansson =

Swedish footballer

Personal information
- Date of birth: 21 January 1887
- Date of death: 4 February 1944 (aged 57)
- Position: Forward

Senior career*
Years	Team	Apps	(Gls)
- Djurgården

International career
1913	Sweden	1	(0)
- * Club domestic league appearances and goals

Victor Jansson (21 January 1887 – 4 February 1944) was a Swedish footballer who played as a forward. He was part of the Djurgården Swedish champions' team of 1912 and 1915. Jansson made one appearance for Sweden in a friendly against Hungary in 1913.

== Honours ==
Djurgårdens IF

- Svenska Mästerskapet: 1912, 1915
