= Samuel Lindqvist =

Swedish football manager

Personal information
- Date of birth: 10 June 1889
- Date of death: 24 March 1937 (aged 47)

Senior career*
Years	Team	Apps	(Gls)
1906–1911	Djurgårdens IF		

International career
1910	Sweden	1	(0)

Managerial career
- 1929–1934: Djurgårdens IF
- * Club domestic league appearances and goals

Samuel Lindqvist (10 June 1889 – 24 March 1937) was a Swedish international footballer and football manager.

Representing Djurgården 1906–11, Samuel Lindqvist played in the Svenska Mästerskapet finals 1906, 1909 and 1910 with the team but never won. Lindqvist debuted for Sweden on 11 September 1910 in a friendly against Norway on Frogner stadion, which was his only appearance for the national team.

He was Djurgårdens IF manager in 1929–32 and in 1932–34 together with Putte Kock.

Samuel Lindqvist also played bowls with Djurgårdens IF and won several national titles in the 1920s.
