= 1904 Svenska Mästerskapet final =

- Event: 1904 Svenska Mästerskapet
Örgryte IS	Djurgårdens IF
2	1
- Date: 16 October 1904
- Venue: Idrottsparken, Stockholm
- Referee: Herman Juhlin, Stockholm
- Attendance: 3,000

The 1904 Svenska Mästerskapet final was played on 16 October 1904 between the seventh-time finalists Örgryte IS and the first-time finalists Djurgårdens IF. The match decided the winner of 1904 Svenska Mästerskapet, the football cup to determine the Swedish champions. Örgryte IS won their sixth title with a 2–1 victory at Idrottsparken in Stockholm.

== Route to the final ==
=== Örgryte IS ===
Örgryte IS's route to the final
	Opponent	Result
PR	Göteborgs IF (H)	4–1
QF	IFK Norrköping (H)	5–0
SF	Östermalms IF (A)	3–2

Örgryte was drawn against Göteborgs IF in the preliminary round and won, 4–1, at home on 10 August 1904. On 18 September 1904, Örgryte beat IFK Norrköping in the quarter-final at home in Gothenburg, 5–0. In the away-game semi-final on 25 September 1904, Örgryte won against Östermalms IF from Stockholm: 3–2 ended the match.

Örgryte made their seventh appearance in a Svenska Mästerskapet final, having won five, lost one, and only missed two.

=== Djurgårdens IF ===
Djurgårdens IF's route to the final
	Opponent	Result
QR	IF Drott (H)	4–0
PR	Norrmalms SK (H)	2–0
QF	Gefle IF (A)	1–0
SF	AIK (H)	3–2

Djurgårdens IF entered in the qualifying round and won against IF Drott on 24 July 1904 at home in Stockholm, 4–0. On 28 August 1904, Djurgården played against Norrmalms SK in the preliminary round and won 2–0 at home. Gefle IF was beaten 1–0 in the quarter-final on 11 September 1904 away in Gävle. In the semi-final, Djurgården won, 3–2, against AIK at home on 25 September 1904.

Djurgården made their first Svenska Mästerskapet final.

== Match details ==
16 October 1904

Örgryte IS	2–1	Djurgårdens IF
E. Bergström 10' unknown 25'		Lavass 27'

Idrottsparken, Stockholm
Attendance: 3,000
Referee: Herman Juhlin, Stockholm

GK	(Sweden) Oskar Bengtsson
DF	(Sweden) Knut Lindberg
DF	(Sweden) Erik Bergström
MF	(Sweden) Folke Borg
MF	(Sweden) Ernst Sandstedt
MF	(Sweden) Hugo Levin
FW	(Sweden) Gustaf Bergström
FW	(Sweden) Hjalmar Orstadius
FW	(Sweden) Erik Lund
FW	(Sweden) Aron L. Hammarbäck
FW	(Sweden) Josef Larsson

GK	(Sweden) Robert Andersson
DF	(Sweden) Carl Jahnzon
DF	(Sweden) Karl Dahlstedt
MF	(Sweden) Hilding Lagergren
MF	(Sweden) Axel Norling
MF	(Sweden) Natanael Lundell
FW	(Sweden) Ivar Friberg
FW	(Sweden) Algot Nilsson
FW	(Sweden) Erik Lavass
FW	(Sweden) Per Egnell
FW	(Sweden) Harald Andrén
