= Götrik Frykman =

Swedish footballer and bandy player

- Götrik Frykman in 1915.

Personal information
- Full name: Götrik Wilhelm Adolf Frykman
- Date of birth: 1 December 1891
- Place of birth: Stockholm, Sweden
- Date of death: 7 April 1944 (aged 52)
- Place of death: Stockholm, Sweden
- Position: Midfielder

Senior career*
Years	Team	Apps	(Gls)
- Djurgårdens IF

International career
1911–1916	Sweden	6	(1)
- * Club domestic league appearances and goals

Götrik Wilhelm Adolf "Putte" Frykman (1 December 1891 – 7 April 1944) was a Swedish bandy player and football player who competed in the 1912 Summer Olympics.

Frykman was born in Stockholm. He was part of the Djurgården side that won the Swedish football championship in 1912 and 1915. He also won the Swedish bandy championship in 1908 and 1912 with Djurgården.

He was a member of the Swedish Olympic squad in 1912. He played as a midfielder in one match at the consolation tournament.

Frykman died in Stockholm.

== Honours ==
=== Football ===
Djurgårdens IF

- Svenska Mästerskapet: 1912, 1915

=== Bandy ===
Djurgårdens IF

- Svenska Mästerskapet: 1908, 1912
