= Herman Myhrberg =

Swedish footballer

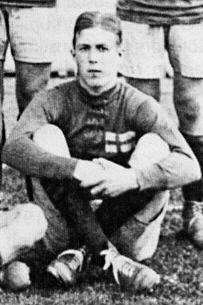
- Herman Myhrberg at the 1912 Olympics

Personal information
- Born: 26 December 1889 Gothenburg, Sweden
- Died: 9 August 1919 (aged 29) Gothenburg, Sweden

Sport
- Sport: Football
- Club: Örgryte IS

Herman Joel Myhrberg (26 December 1889 – 9 August 1919) was a Swedish association football player who competed in the 1912 Summer Olympics. He played as forward one match in the main tournament as well as one match in the consolation tournament.
