= Oskar Bengtsson =

Swedish footballer (1885–1972)

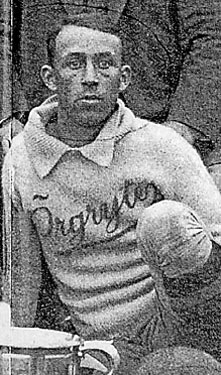

Personal information
- Full name: Karl Oscar Vilhelm Bengtsson
- Born: 14 January 1885
- Died: 13 October 1972 (aged 87)

Karl Oscar Vilhelm Bengtsson (14 January 1885 – 13 October 1972) was a Swedish football player who competed in the 1908 Summer Olympics. In the 1908 tournament he was a part of the Swedish football team that finished in 4th place.
