= Erik Bergström =

Swedish footballer

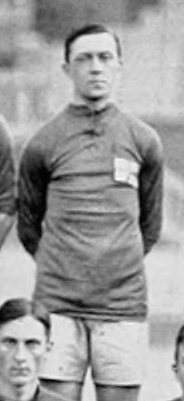
Bergström in 1912.

Erik "Backen" Bergström (6 January 1886 – 30 January 1966) was a Swedish amateur football (soccer) player who competed in the 1912 Summer Olympics.

He was a member of the Swedish Olympic squad in 1912. He played as defender one match in the main tournament as well as one match in the consolation tournament.

His brother, Gustaf Bergström, competed in the 1908 Summer Olympics.
