= Ruben Gelbord =

Swedish footballer, manager, and referee (1878–1945)

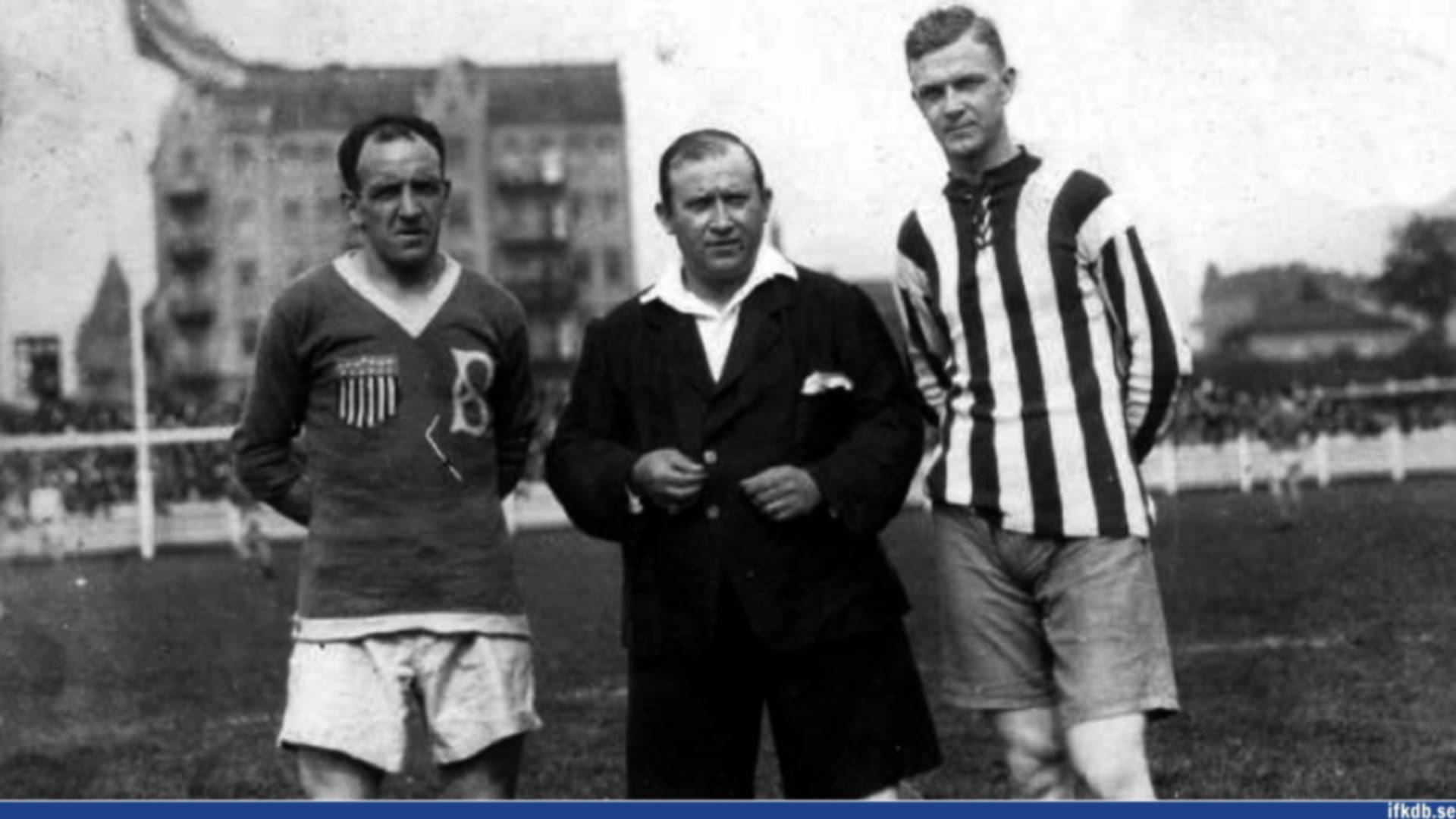
- Gelbord (center) in 1919

Personal information
- Date of birth: 25 April 1878
- Place of birth: Augustova, Russian Empire
- Date of death: 15 December 1945 (aged 67)
- Place of death: Stockholm, Sweden
- Position: Defender

Youth career
- –1900: IK Svea
- 1900–1903: AIK

Senior career*
Years	Team	Apps	(Gls)
1903–????	AIK		

Managerial career
- 1912–1913: Sweden
Refereeing career
Domestic
Years	League	Role
1910–1923	Svenska Serien	Referee
1924–1928	Allsvenskan	Referee
International
Years	League	Role
1908–1924	FIFA listed	Referee
- * Club domestic league appearances and goals

Ruben Gelbord (25 April 1878 – 15 December 1945) was a Swedish footballer, manager, and referee.

== Early life ==
Gelbord was born in Augustova to a Jewish family, before moving to Sweden at the age of 12.

== Playing and managerial career ==
As a footballer, Gelbord played as a defender for IK Svea. In 1900, he joined AIK, before becoming part of their first team in 1903. In 1912, he became the manager of the Sweden men's national team, coaching in seven friendly matches across 1912 and 1913.

Gelbord served as the chairman of the Stockholms Fotbollförbund between 1917 and 1927, and was a member of both the Swedish Football Association's board from 1907 to 1919 and 1922 to 1933, and selection committee from 1912 to 1920 and 1922 to 1933. Additionally, he was also the chairman of IF Linnéa between 1922 and 1925.

== Refereeing career ==
Throughout his career, Gelbord was often hired as a referee for various matches, including league, cup, and international matches, as well as bandy and ice hockey matches.

He made his refereeing debut in 1908, during an international match between Sweden and England. Two years later, he officiated his first league match, being a 1–1 draw between IFK Eskilstuna and Göteborgs FF. Additionally, he officiated 20 matches in the Allsvenskan between 1924 and 1928. Additionally, he officiated eight Svenska Mästerskapet finals between 1907 and 1925, as well as the Norwegian Football Cup finals in 1911 and 1913.

At the 1912 Summer Olympics, he officiated two matches, including Denmark's 7–0 win against Norway and Great Britain's 4–0 win against Finland. In 1920, he declined a request to officiate the semi-finals of that year's Summer Olympics between Belgium and the Netherlands.

Overall, Gelbord officiated over 1,000 matches across all sports throughout his career.

== Personal life and legacy ==
In 1915, Gelbord founded a sports retailer in Sweden called AB Ruben Gelbord Sportaffär. He was inducted into the Swedish Football Hall of Fame in 2022.
