= Walhalla IP =

Former football stadium in Gothenburg, Sweden

Walhalla Idrottsplats
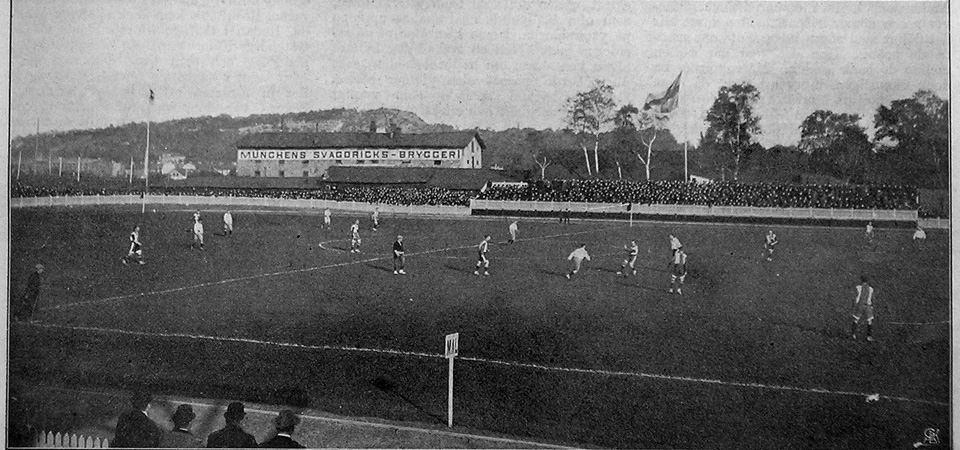
- Walhalla IP in 1908
- Interactive map of Walhalla Idrottsplats
- Location: Gothenburg, Sweden
- Coordinates: 57.698118°N 11.990568°E
- Owner: Örgryte IS
- Capacity: 8,000 (1,200 seated)
- Type: Sports venue
- Surface: Grass
- Field size: 126 × 86 m

Construction
- Groundbreaking: 1908
- Built: 1908
- Opened: 6 September 1908
- Demolished: 1921–1923
- Cost: SEK 50,000
- Architect: Frans Frise

Tenants
- Örgryte IS 1908–1921; IFK Göteborg 1908–1915

Walhalla Idrottsplats (short form Walhalla IP) was a sports stadium in Gothenburg, Sweden with a total capacity of 8,000. It was located near Korsvägen, on the site that currently is the Swedish Exhibition and Congress Centre. Walhalla IP was in use between 1908 and 1921.

== History ==
Walhalla IP was built by Örgryte IS in 1908 to replace their old stadium Balders Hage as the Swedish Football Association had banned international football on it. The city deeded land to Örgryte IS for this purpose, which today is used by the Swedish Exhibition and Congress Centre, opposite to amusement park Liseberg.

The roofed main stand had 1,200 seats, and another 6,800 spectators could be accommodated on terraces around the pitch. The stadium was modelled after Liverpool F.C.'s Anfield. At the time of its opening, Walhalla IP was the most modern stadium in Scandinavia. The pitch was enclosed by a slightly longer than 400 metre running track and other athletics facilities, and several Swedish athletics championships were held in the stadium.

The inauguration match was played on 6 September 1908, between Örgryte and German champions Viktoria Berlin. It was the main venue for sports events in Sweden until Stockholm Olympic Stadium was opened in 1912. The Sweden national team played its first ever international against England national football team on Walhalla IP in September 1908, and IFK Göteborg—that rented the stadium from Örgryte IS—won their two first Swedish championships, in 1908 and 1910, there.

In 1912, the stadium was the scene of one of the first known instances of Swedish football hooliganism. IFK Göteborg supporters stormed the pitch to get to the referee, who had first awarded IFK a penalty kick against Örgryte IS in the last minute of the match, but then blown the final whistle before the kick could be taken.

IFK Göteborg left Walhalla IP for newly built Ullevi in 1916. The land on which Walhalla IP stood was chosen as one of the sites for the 1923 Gothenburg Tercentennial Jubilee Exposition, and Örgryte IS was forced to move from the stadium as a consequence. The last event at Walhalla was an international sports gala arranged by Örgryte and held on 25 September 1921.
