= Einar Olsson (footballer) =

Swedish sportsperson (1886–1983)

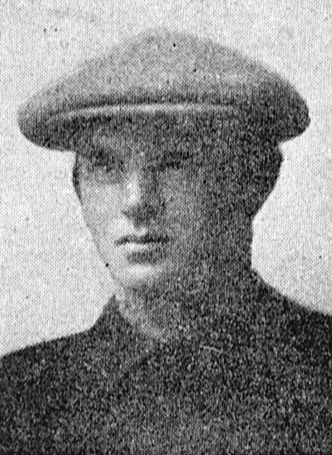

Personal information
- Full name: Einar Emil Andreas Olsson
- Date of birth: 18 July 1886
- Date of death: 1983 (aged 96–97)
- Position: Inside right

Senior career*
Years	Team	Apps	(Gls)
- Djurgården
- * Club domestic league appearances and goals

Einar Emil Andreas Olsson (18 July 1886 – 1983) was a Swedish footballer, ski jumper, Nordic combined skier, and ski-orienteer.

== Biography ==
Olsson was born on 18 July 1886 to first office attendant Anders Olsson and Matilda Svensson. From 1899 to 1904, Olsson represented Östermalms IF. In 1905, he joined Djurgårdens IF and represented the club in different sports. He became national champion in ski jumping, Nordic combined, ski orienteering and football.

In 1910, Olsson won the first Swedish championships held in Nordic combined and ski jumping. He would defend his titles the following year. In 1913, Olsson won the ski jumping event at the 1913 Nordic Games. From 1914 to 1916, Olsson won three consecutive national championships in ski jumping. In 1914, 1915, 1918, 1920, and 1921, Olsson further won the national titles in Nordic combined, totalling his national championship titles to five in ski jumping and seven in Nordic combined. He also won the Swedish championship title in ski orienteering relay in 1915. The team consisted of Olof Söderberg, N. A. Hedjerson, Albin Sandström, O. B. Hansson, and Olsson.

In football, Olsson was an inside right. He was part of Djurgården's Swedish championship-winning teams of 1912, 1915, and 1917. Olsson made 25 Svenska Serien appearances for Djurgården and scored 6 goals. He declined to represent the national team.

Olsson worked for the Swedish postal service. After his active career, he became board member of the Djurgårdens IF Nordic skiing department.

Olsson died in 1983.

== Honours ==
Djurgårdens IF

- Svenska Mästerskapet (3): 1912, 1915, 1917
