= Bertil Nordenskjöld =

Swedish footballer (1891–1975)

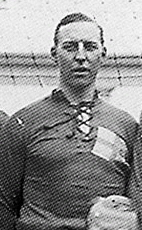
- Nordenskjöld in 1920

Personal information
- Full name: Bertil Fredrik Eugene Nordenskjöld
- Date of birth: 24 May 1891
- Place of birth: Lilla Mellösa, Sweden
- Date of death: 17 March 1975 (aged 83)
- Place of death: Stockholm, Sweden
- Position: Midfielder

Senior career*
Years	Team	Apps	(Gls)
1909–1920	Djurgårdens IF		

International career
1910–1920	Sweden	8	(0)

Managerial career
- 1923–1929: Djurgårdens IF
- * Club domestic league appearances and goals

Bertil Fredrik Eugene "Nocke" Nordenskjöld (24 May 1891 – 17 March 1975) was a Swedish football midfielder who played at the 1920 Summer Olympics.

Representing Djurgården from 1909 to 1920, Nordenskjöld played 11 Svenska Mästerskapet finals, including replays, and won four. He made eight appearances for Sweden between 1910 and 1920. He debuted for Sweden on 11 September 1910 in a friendly against Norway on Frogner stadion.

Between 1928 and 1942, he was the chairman of Djurgårdens IF main board.

== Honours ==
Djurgårdens IF

- Svenska Mästerskapet: 1912, 1915, 1917, 1920
