= Djurgårdens IF Fotboll =

Association football club in Sweden

Djurgården
- Full name: Djurgårdens IF Fotbollsförening
- Nicknames: Järnkaminerna (The Iron Stoves); Blåränderna (The Blue Stripes)
- Short name: DIF; Djurgår'n
- Founded: 12 March 1891; 135 years ago 1899; 127 years ago (football department)
- Ground: 3Arena, Stockholm
- Capacity: 30,000
- Chairman: Erik Gozzi
- Head coach: TBD
- League: Allsvenskan
- 2025: Allsvenskan, 5th of 16
- Website: www.dif.se
Home colours	Away colours	Third colours

Djurgårdens IF Fotbollsförening – commonly known as Djurgårdens IF, Djurgården Fotboll (official name), Djurgården (IPA: [ˈjʉ̂ːrˌɡoːɖɛn]), and (especially locally) Djurgår'n (IPA: [ˈjʉ̌ː(r)ɡɔɳ]), Dif or DIF (Note: In the media, "Djurgårdens IF" is normally abbreviated "Dif", in accordance with Swedish writing standards that state that acronyms that are pronounced as a word, as opposed to letter by letter, should be spelled with the first letter in upper case and the remaining in lower case, thus "Dif". However, some fans of the club, as well as the club itself, prefer to use only uppercase, "DIF", even though they also pronounce it as a word: [diːf].) – is a Swedish professional men's association football department of its parent association Djurgårdens IF. Founded 1891 on the island of Djurgården, the club's home ground is 3Arena, situated in the Johanneshov district of Stockholm.

Competing in the highest Swedish tier, Allsvenskan, the club has won the national title twelve times and the Svenska Cupen five times. The national titles have mainly been won during three separate eras. The first period was the 1910s, when the team won four national titles. The second era occurred in the 1950s and 1960s, when Djurgården won the league four times. The most recent era was during the first half of the 2000s, when they won both the league and the cup three times. From 2017, the club has again made a mark, this time both nationally and internationally, highlighted by the Svenska Cupen title in 2018, the league title in 2019, and reaching the 2024–25 UEFA Conference League semi-finals.

Supporters of the club, called djurgårdare, are found in all socio-economic spheres and throughout all areas of Stockholm and, to some extent, all over Sweden. However Vasastaden and Östermalm, where Djurgården's former home ground Stockholm Stadion is situated, is by some considered the club's heartland. Djurgården is affiliated to the Stockholms Fotbollförbund.

== History ==
=== Foundation ===
Djurgårdens IF was founded primarily by John G. Jansson, on 12 March 1891, at a café in Alberget 4A on the island of Djurgården in central Stockholm. Most of the founding members were from the dockyard-industry working class, an identity that remained true until the 1950s and 1960s.

The club originally focused on winter sports and athletics. The first true football field in Stockholm was created in 1896. Djurgårdens IF's football department was formed in 1899 with the help of former GAIS player Teodor Andersson. The team played its first match in July 1899, a 1–2 loss against AIK.

=== Swedish Championship titles – 1912 to 1920 ===
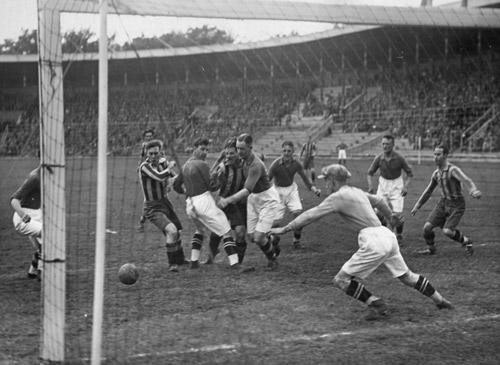
Djurgården playing against IK Brage at Stockholms Stadion in 1930.

The team's first real achievement was in 1902 when they finished second in the Rosenska Pokalen tournament. Just two years later, in 1904, they participated in their first Svenska Mästerskapet final, but were defeated 2–1 by Örgryte IS.

The team lost three more Swedish Championship finals, all against teams from Gothenburg (1906 against Örgryte, 1909 against Örgryte and 1910 against IFK Göteborg), before their first victory came in the 1912 final with a 3–1 win against Örgryte. In 1910, the first Djurgården players were selected for the Swedish national team – Ivar Friberg, Erik Lavass, Samuel Lindqvist, and Bertil Nordenskjöld played in a friendly against Norway on 11 September 1910.

The club won three more Swedish Championships in the 1910s and 1920s, the 1915 final against Örgryte, the 1917 final against AIK, and the 1920 final against IK Sleipner. They reached twelve of the thirty championship finals played to 1925. Bertil Nordenskjöld and Ragnar Wicksell took part in all four finals from 1912 to 1920; Gottfrid Johansson, Einar Olsson and Sten Söderberg in three. Nordenskjöld played in all Djurgården's Svenska Mästerskapet finals. Although the team became Swedish champions four times during the period when the title was decided by a championship final, Djurgården never managed to win the national league of the period, the Svenska Serien.

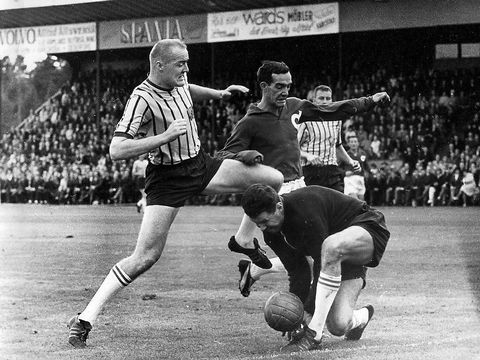
Hans Mild shielding his goalkeeper from the onrushing Degerfors IF player Tord Grip.

Djurgården did not qualify for the first season of Allsvenskan, and only reached the league twice between 1924 and 1944, in 1927–28 and 1936–37, both times being directly relegated back to the second tier Division 2. On 31 July 1927, the club played its first Allsvenskan game and won against Stattena IF and Georg Ehmke scored the first goal for the club. The club also played three seasons in the then third tier, Division 3, between 1929 and 1932. From 1944 on, Djurgården became a stable Allsvenskan team. Stockholm Olympic Stadium, built for the 1912 Summer Olympics, became Djurgården's permanent home ground in 1936, replacing Tranebergs IP.

=== Swedish Championship titles – 1955 to 1966 ===
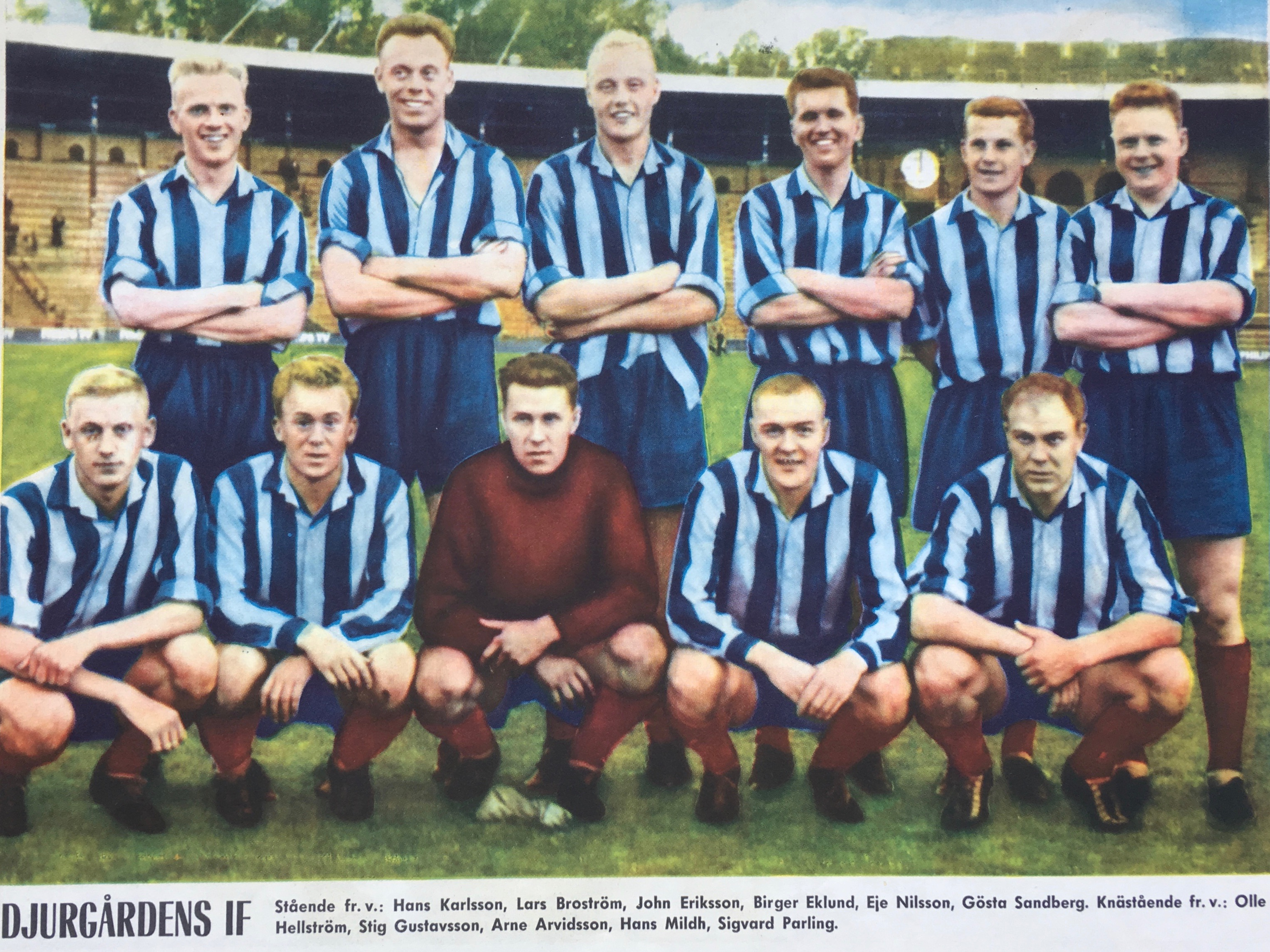
Djurgårdens IF team of 1959. Back from left: Hans Karlsson, Lars Broström, John Eriksson, Birger Eklund, Eje Nilsson, Gösta Sandberg; front from left: Olle Hellström, Stig Gustafsson, Arne Arvidsson, Hans Mild och Sigge Parling.

In 1951, Djurgården were runners-up in Svenska Cupen after a 1–2 final loss against Malmö FF; this was the team's first Svenska Cupen final. Four years later, under manager Frank Soo, they won Allsvenskan for the first time in the 1954–55 season, their fifth national title. In 1955–56, Djurgården became the first Swedish team to enter the European Cup. After beating Gwardia Warszawa in the first round, they advanced to the quarter-finals where they were drawn against Hibernian, but they lost 1–4 over the two legs.

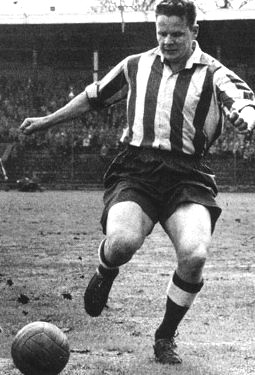
Gösta Sandberg also known as "Mr Djurgården".

In 1959, both the football team and Djurgårdens IF's hockey team won their respective championships in Sweden's two most popular sports, a remarkable happening. The 1959 Allsvenskan title was secured in a match against AIK at the Råsunda Stadium. The attendance of 48,894 people was a record for a match involving Djurgården, whose title-winning team were Sven Tumba, Birger Eklund, Lars Broström, John Eriksson, Hans Karlsson, Gösta Sandberg, Olle Hellström, Stig Gustafsson, Arne Arvidsson, Hans Mild and Sigge Parling.

Only a year later, however, Djurgården finished 11th and were relegated to the second division, but the team only needed one season to return to Allsvenskan. In 1964 and 1966, Djurgården won their seventh and eight championships, with 1966 marking the end of Gösta Sandberg's career. Sandberg played 322 league matches for the team from 1951 to 1966, and scored 77 goals. His nickname was "Mr Djurgården" and, in 1991, he was named "Djurgårdare of the century". Sandberg also played for the club's bandy and ice hockey sections. He died on his way home after attending the Tvillingderbyt in 2006.

It was during the 1950s to 1960s period that the club nickname "Järnkaminerna" (lit. 'The Iron Stoves') was established, due to the team's physical playing style. The ideal of a strong and uncompromising Djurgården player might also be traced back to the club's working-class roots.

=== 1970s to 1990s ===
A chart showing the progress of Djurgårdens IF through the Swedish football league system. The different shades of gray represent league divisions.

Djurgården were members of Allsvenskan through the 1970s and had three third-places and a final loss in the 1975 Svenska Cupen final as their best seasons. Gary Williams became the first foreign player join the team in the 1977 season. The 1980s was not a good decade for the club, as they were relegated from Allsvenskan in 1981 and, after losing two promotion play-offs, made a temporary return to the highest league in 1986. Future England striker Teddy Sheringham had a brief spell at Djurgården as a 19-year-old loanee in 1985–86, and was part of the squad that won the promotion to Allsvenskan after beating GAIS in a dramatic penalty shoot-out in the playoffs. In 1987, besides being relegated again, Djurgårdens IF Fotboll presented a 12 million Swedish krona deficit and was later transformed into an aktiebolag.

Djurgården gained another promotion in 1989. This time, they stayed in Allsvenskan for five consecutive seasons and, in 1990, the team won the Svenska Cupen for the first time. They also achieved the club's record victory when they defeated local rivals Hammarby 9–1 in Allsvenskan on 13 August that year. After a promising start to the 1990s, the club was relegated from Allsvenskan three times, and promoted back twice. During this decade, the club's economic problems almost caused bankruptcy. The 1995 season started well, but ended badly; in the last home match of the 1995 Allsvenskan, a supporter, later named "Terror-Tommy" in the media, came onto the pitch and kicked referee Anders Frisk.

=== 2000s "golden era" (1999–2006) ===
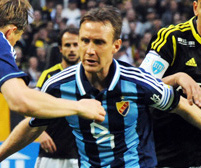
Andreas Johansson in 2013.

In the middle of the 1999 season, Zoran Lukic and Sören Åkeby took over the team and won the inaugural 2000 Superettan. They also finished second, although newly promoted, in the 2001 Allsvenskan. With a team which included Stefan Rehn, Kim Källström, Andreas Johansson, and Andreas Isaksson, Djurgården secured their first championship title in 36 years in the last round of the 2002 Allsvenskan. Later in the year, Djurgården also won Svenska Cupen by beating AIK, 1–0 on golden goal. The first half of the 2000s was a golden era for the club, with three championships (2002, 2003 and 2005) and three cup wins (2002, 2004 and 2005). This "golden era" for Djurgården ended with a sixth-place finish in 2006. The club was one of the main contenders for the league championship in 2007, but ultimately finished in third place. The golden era saw the club play against European clubs Juventus, FC Girondins de Bordeaux, Shamrock Rovers, FK Partizan and FC Utrecht in European competitions, the most remarkable result being a 2–2 draw against Juventus at Stadio Delle Alpi.

=== 2009 to 2026 ===
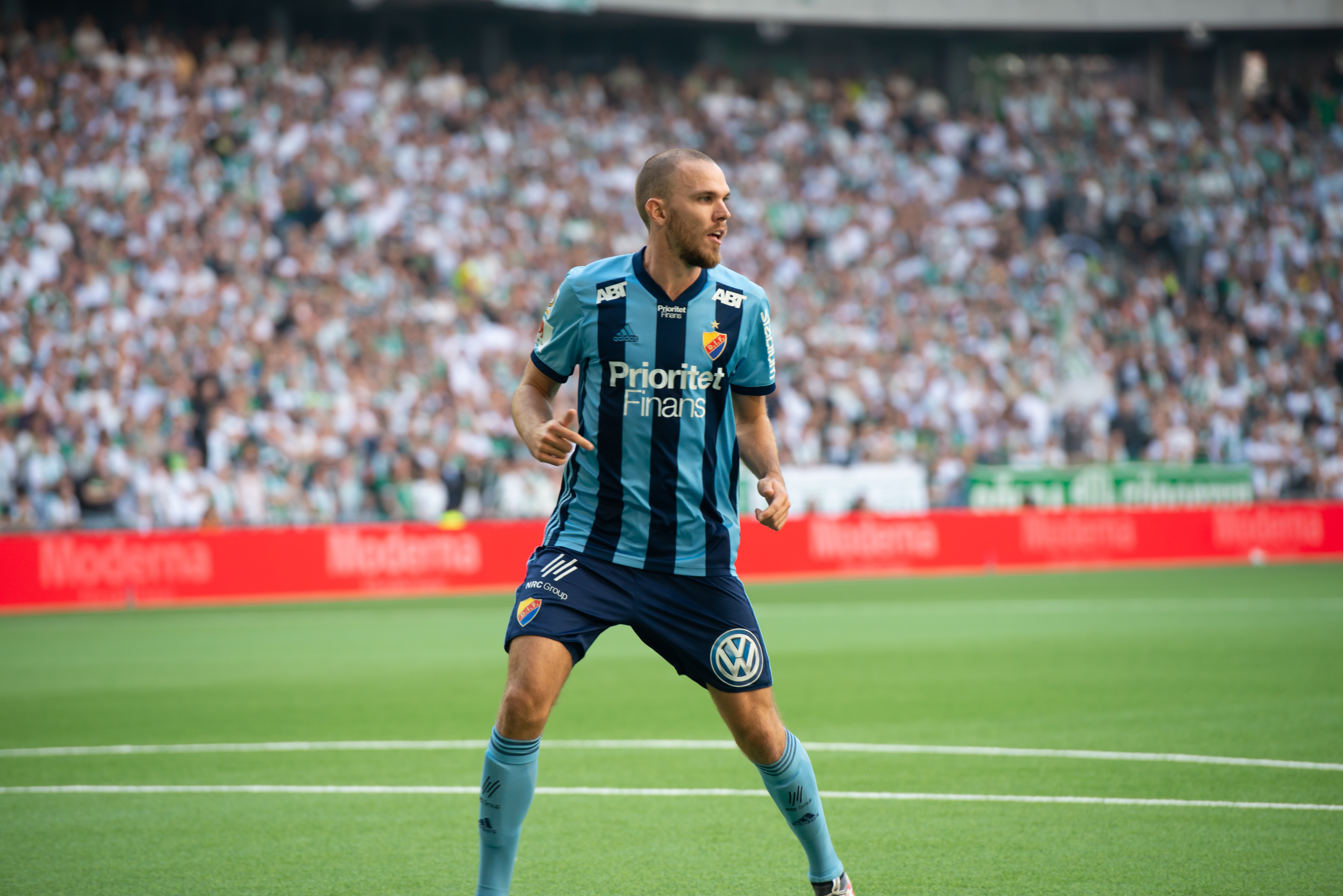
Marcus Danielson in 2018.

Djurgården survived a relegation play-off in 2009 against Assyriska to remain in Allsvenskan, after Mattias Jonson had scored the winning goal in extra time. For the next five seasons, they became a mid-table team in the league. Bo Andersson, who had been a club director Djurgården during their three national titles in the 2000s, returned, now as director of sports, in late 2013, but he was forced to sell several good players to try and balance the books. In January 2017, Djurgården sold the Kenyan international forward Michael Olunga for a club record fee of SEK 40 million which transformed the club's finances into one of the best in Sweden. The transfer also made it possible to sign club legend Kim Källström and fellow former Swedish international Jonas Olsson. Both players, together with recently returned goalkeeper Andreas Isaksson, played important roles as Djurgården finished in third place in the 2017 Allsvenskan, qualifying for European football for the first time in ten years, this time for the second qualifying round for the 2018–19 UEFA Europa League. After 13 years without any titles, Djurgården won the Svenska Cupen on 10 May 2018 after going through the tournament without conceding a single goal. They defeated Malmö FF 3–0 in the final at Tele2 Arena.

For the 2019 season, Kim Bergstrand and Thomas Lagerlöf became the team managers, replacing Özcan Melkemichel. Djurgården won the league title for the first time in fourteen years, securing a spot in the 2020–21 UEFA Champions League third qualifying round. After the season Djurgården sold defender and team captain Marcus Danielson to the Chinese club Dalian Professional for what was reported to be a club record fee of more than SEK 50 million. This made Djurgården one of Sweden's wealthiest clubs along with various other sales.

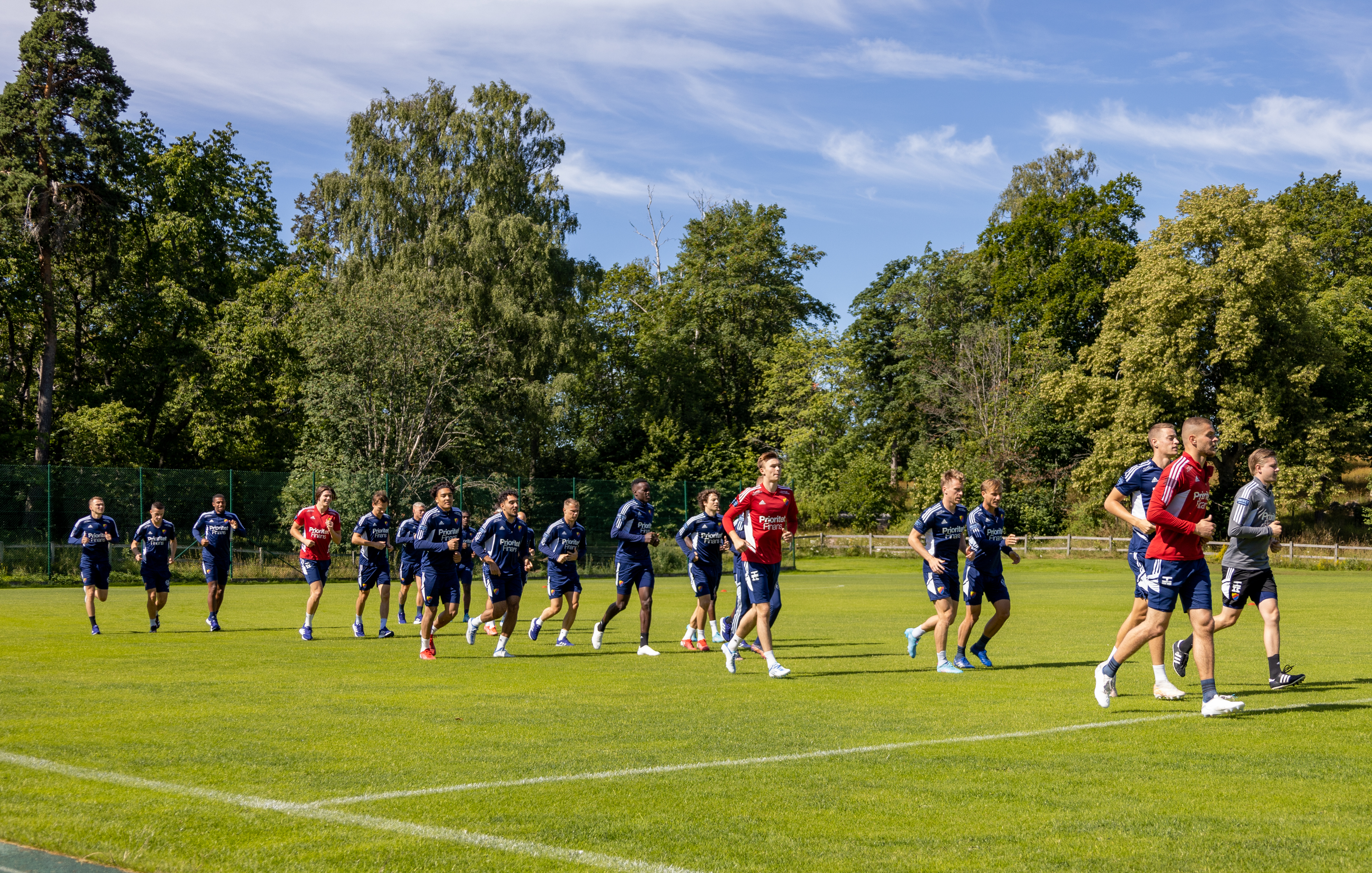
Djurgården squad during practice in 2022

Djurgården finished fourth in the 2020 season when all matches were played in empty stadiums because of the COVID-19 pandemic. In 2021, they finished third to earn a place in the second qualifying round of the 2022–23 UEFA Europa Conference League. They finished second in the 2022 season, again qualifying for the Conference League, and then fourth in 2023. On 2 February 2024, Djurgården sold one of their most talented youngsters, Lucas Bergvall, to Premier League club Tottenham Hotspur for a reported club record fee of €10 million, and on 28 July the club announced that they had sold Samuel Dahl to AS Roma in Serie A.

On 21 October 2024 the club announced that they would part ways with their manager duo Lagerlöf and Bergstrand after a turbulent second half of the season. This marked the end of their six years at the club, they left their positions with three domestic games left and games in the league phase of the Conference League. Despite the turbulent fall the club finished fifth overall in the league phase of the UEFA Conference League under the interim leadership, they qualified for the round of 16. On 20 December 2024 the club announced the appointment of their new manager, Jani Honkavaara from Finland.

On 18 March 2026 Djurgården announced that their long serving director of sports Bosse Andersson would leave his role and the club after more than a decade. The departure of Andersson was the third change in leading roles at the club, after both a new CEO and chairman were appointed and voted in by the club’s members respectively. The club also started a partnership with Tony Bloom's Jamestown Analytics to help improve their data-driven player scouting.

=== A new era ===
On 15 June 2026 the club announced Maximilian Hahn, formerly of West Ham United, as their new director of sports.

== European cups and tournaments ==
This is Djurgården's history in past and forthcoming international cups and tournaments organised by UEFA. Royal League is not included since it was not arranged by UEFA, but the club qualified for the tournament in 2004–05, 2005–06 and 2007–08).

Season	Competition	Round	Opponent	Home	Away	Total
1955–56	European Cup	1R	(Poland) Gwardia Warsaw	0–0	4–1	4–1
1955–56	European Cup	QF	(Scotland) Hibernian	1–3	0–1	1–4
1964–65	Inter-Cities Fairs Cup	1R	(England) Manchester United	1–1	1–6	2–7
1965–66	European Cup	PR	(Bulgaria) PFC Levski Sofia	2–1	0–6	2–7
1966–67	Inter-Cities Fairs Cup	1R	(East Germany) Lokomotive Leipzig	1–3	1–2	2–5
1967–68	European Cup	1R	(Poland) Górnik Zabrze	0–1	0–3	0–4
1971–72	UEFA Cup	1R	(Socialist Federal Republic of Yugoslavia) OFK Beograd	2–2	1–4	3–6
1974–75	UEFA Cup	1R	(Norway) IK Start	5–0	2–1	7–1
1974–75	UEFA Cup	2R	(Czechoslovakia) Dukla Prague	0–2	1–3	1–5
1975–76	UEFA Cup Winners' Cup	1R	(Wales) Wrexham	1–1	1–2	2–3
1976–77	UEFA Cup	1R	(Netherlands) Feyenoord	2–1	0–3	2–4
1989–90	UEFA Cup Winners' Cup	1R	Union Luxembourg	5–0	0–0	5–0
1989–90	UEFA Cup Winners' Cup	2R	(Spain) Real Valladolid	2–2	0–2	2–3
1990–91	UEFA Cup Winners' Cup	1R	(Iceland) Fram	1–1	0–3	1–4
1996	Intertoto Cup	Group 2	(Austria) LASK Linz	—	0–2	3rd place
1996	Intertoto Cup	Group 2	(Cyprus) Apollon Limassol	8–0	—	3rd place
1996	Intertoto Cup	Group 2	(Germany) Werder Bremen	—	2–3	3rd place
1996	Intertoto Cup	Group 2	(Faroe Islands) B68 Toftir	5–1	—	3rd place
2002–03	UEFA Cup	QR	(Republic of Ireland) Shamrock Rovers	2–0	3–1	5–1
2002–03	UEFA Cup	1R	(Denmark) F.C. Copenhagen	3–1	0–0	3–1
2002–03	UEFA Cup	2R	(France) Girondins Bordeaux	0–1	1–2	1–3
2003–04	UEFA Champions League	Q2	(Socialist Federal Republic of Yugoslavia) Partizan	2–2	1–1	3–3
2004–05	UEFA Champions League	Q2	(Lithuania) FBK Kaunas	0–0	2–0	2–0
2004–05	UEFA Champions League	Q3	(Italy) Juventus FC	1–4	2–2	3–6
2004–05	UEFA Cup	1R	(Netherlands) FC Utrecht	3–0	0–4	3–4
2005–06	UEFA Cup	Q2	(Republic of Ireland) Cork City	1–1	0–0	1–1
2006–07	UEFA Champions League	Q2	(Slovakia) MFK Ružomberok	1–0	1–3	2–3
2008–09	UEFA Cup	Q1	(Estonia) Flora	0–0	2–2	2–2
2008–09	UEFA Cup	Q2	(Norway) Rosenborg	2–1	0–5	2–6
2018–19	UEFA Europa League	Q2	(Ukraine) FC Mariupol	1–1	1–2	2–3
2020–21	UEFA Champions League	Q1	(Hungary) Ferencvárosi TC (A)	0–2		
2020–21	UEFA Europa League	Q2	(Gibraltar) Europa FC (H)	2–1		
2020–21	UEFA Europa League	Q3	(Romania) CFR Cluj (H)	0–1		
2022–23	UEFA Europa Conference League	Q2	(Croatia) HNK Rijeka	2–0	2–1	4–1
2022–23	UEFA Europa Conference League	Q3	(Romania) Sepsi OSK	3–1	3–1	6–2
2022–23	UEFA Europa Conference League	PO	(Cyprus) APOEL FC	3–0	2–3	5–3
2022–23	UEFA Europa Conference League	Group F	(Belgium) Gent	4–2	1–0	1st
2022–23	UEFA Europa Conference League	Group F	(Norway) Molde	3–2	3–2	1st
2022–23	UEFA Europa Conference League	Group F	(Republic of Ireland) Shamrock Rovers	1–0	0–0	1st
2022–23	UEFA Europa Conference League	R16	(Poland) Lech Poznań	0–3	0–2	0–5
2023–24	UEFA Europa Conference League	Q2	(Switzerland) Luzern	1–2	1–1	2–3
2024–25	UEFA Europa Conference League	Q2	(Luxembourg) Progrès Niederkorn	3–0	0–1	3–1
2024–25	UEFA Europa Conference League	Q3	(Finland) Ilves	3–1	1–1	4–2
2024–25	UEFA Europa Conference League	PO	(Slovenia) NK Maribor	1–0	1–0	2–0
2024–25	UEFA Europa Conference League	League phase	(Austria) LASK	—N/a	2–2	5th
2024–25	UEFA Europa Conference League	League phase	(Portugal) Vitória S.C.	1–2	—N/a	5th
2024–25	UEFA Europa Conference League	League phase	(Greece) Panathinaikos	2–1	—N/a	5th
2024–25	UEFA Europa Conference League	League phase	(Wales) The New Saints	—N/a	1–0	5th
2024–25	UEFA Europa Conference League	League phase	(Iceland) Vikingur Reykjavik	—N/a	2–1	5th
2024–25	UEFA Europa Conference League	League phase	(Poland) Legia Warsaw	3–1	—N/a	5th
2024–25	UEFA Europa Conference League	R16	(Cyprus) Pafos FC	3–0	0–1	3–1
2024–25	UEFA Europa Conference League	QF	(Austria) Rapid Wien	0–1	4–1	4–2
2024–25	UEFA Europa Conference League	SF	(England) Chelsea FC	1–4	0–1	1–5

=== UEFA Club ranking ===
As of 27 November 2025

Rank	Team	Points
65	(Switzerland) FC Basel	34.500
66	(Slovakia) Bratislava	32.000
67	(Sweden) Djurgårdens IF	32.000
68	(Belgium) Anderlecht	30.750
69	(Poland) Legia	30.500

== Supporters, rivalries and friendships ==
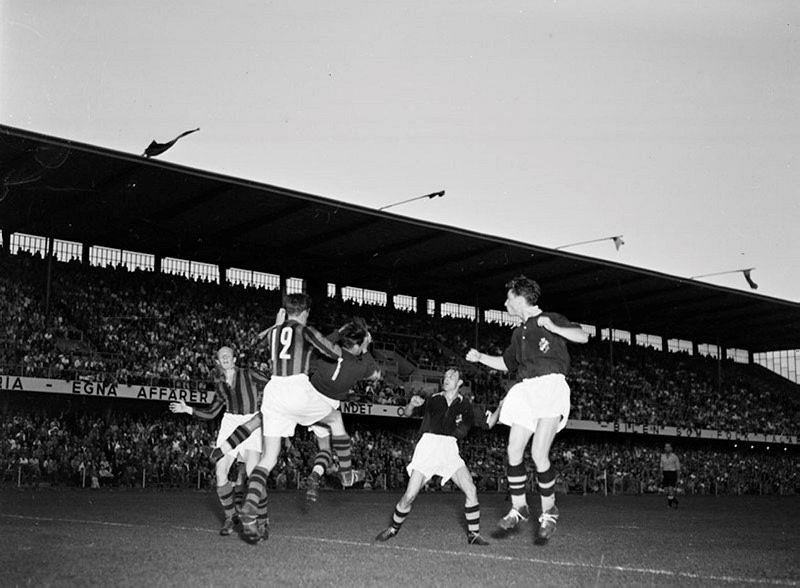
Tvillingderbyt in the 1950–51 Allsvenskan season.

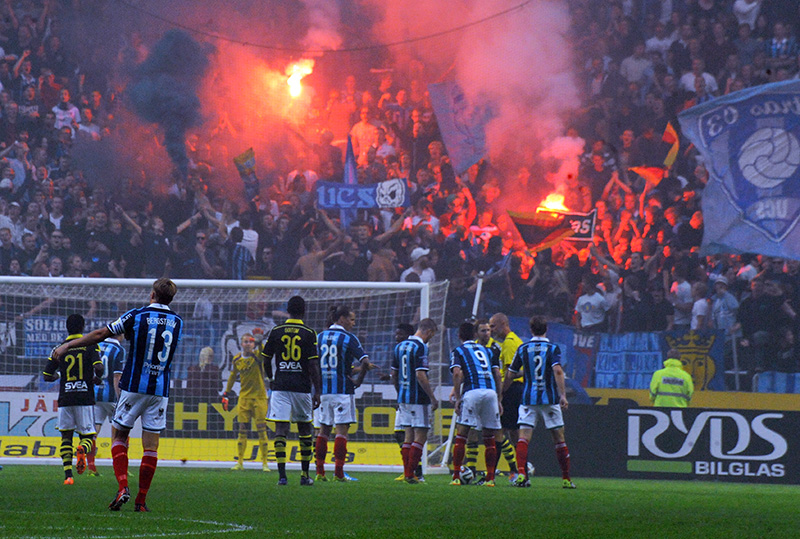
Djurgården supporters during the Tvillingderbyt against AIK from the 2014 Allsvenskan season.

Djurgården is one of the best-supported clubs in Sweden with around 24,500 members and 14,754 season ticket holders as of 2023. Most of its supporters live in Stockholm and the neighbouring suburbs. Traditionally, the northern part of the inner city with Vasastan and the affluent borough of Östermalm is considered to be the club's stronghold (Östermalm where the club's former home ground, the Olympic Stadium, is located). However, a 2015 t-shirt campaign suggests that supporters are spread fairly evenly throughout all of Stockholm.

Although Djurgården's supporters have been organizing themselves since the late 1940s, with the founding of DIF Supporters Club back in 1947, the 1970s saw singing supporter factions emerging which led to a new supporter club to be founded in 1981, named "Blue Saints". The supporter club later changed its name in 1997 to Järnkaminerna (lit. 'the Iron Stoves') since the old name was perceived to be associated with violence. Järnkaminerna is Djurgården's official supporters' group with a membership of about 5,800.

The 2000s saw the emergence and creation of independent ultras groups. The oldest active ultra group, "Ultra Caos Stockholm", formed in 2003, is largely influenced by southern European supporter culture. In 2005 Fabriken Stockholm was formed and took over the role of creating tifos for the team's games from a former, now dissolved group, Ultras Stockholm, founded in the late 1990s. In 2013 a larger and more open organization (Sofia Tifo) was formed and took charge of the terrace choreography, headed by Ultra Caos Stockholm. The club's ultras are located in the lower part of Sofialäktaren (the Sofia stand), located in the south part of the stadium. The name comes from a hospital, Sophiahemmet, situated behind the northern section of Stockholms stadion where the ultras used to stand when Djurgården played there.

=== Rivalries ===
Djurgårdens archrival is AIK, which was founded on 15 February 1891 while Djurgården itself was founded just four weeks later on 12 March. Both clubs trace their roots to Stockholm City Centre. Hence, games between the teams are called Tvillingderbyt (lit. 'Derby of the twins') by the media, a name that has not caught on among supporters since they don't view themselves as such. They are also historically the biggest and most successful clubs from Stockholm, with 21 titles won by AIK and 17 by Djurgården. Games between the two teams draw large crowds of rival supporters and can often be highly charged occasions.

Hammarby is Djurgården's other main rival, mostly because of their geographical proximity in central Stockholm, with Djurgårdens stronghold being in the Vasastan and Östermalm districts while Hammarby is centered in Södermalm. Since 2013 the two teams have shared the same home ground, the 3 Arena.

=== Friendships ===
The club’s supporters, particularly the ultras, maintain friendly ties with the German club VfL Osnabrück.

== Crest, colours and name ==
The first crest of the club was a four-pointed silver star in saltire, which had a shield on it with the letters DIF. This star pre-dates the similar star which Idrottsföreningen Kamraterna adopted and is using to this day. The present crest, in the form of a shield in yellow, red, and blue with the text D.I.F. was adopted in 1896. According to an often-quoted poem by Johan af Klercker from 1908, blue and yellow stand for Sweden and red stands for love. Blue and yellow are also the colours of Stockholm.

The club is named after the city park and borough Djurgården, which originally was a royal hunting park. A direct translation of Djurgården would be "animal garden" or "animal yard". The word djur is cognate with the English word "deer", so "deer garden" may have been the name's original meaning. The IF in Djurgårdens IF stands for sports association, and FF in Djurgårdens IF FF stands for football association.

Djurgården has two nicknames: Järnkaminerna (The Iron Stoves) and Blåränderna (The Blue Stripes).

=== Kit ===
The home shirt has vertical sky and dark blue stripes, hence the clubs nickname Blåränderna (the Blue Stripes). The shorts are usually dark blue but have occasionally been white.

In 2021 Djurgården signed a new five year deal with the clubs kit manufacturer Adidas who now releases a new kit for the team every year.

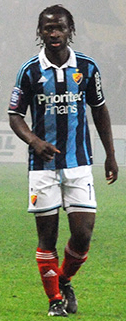
Amadou Jawo wearing the 2014 Allsvenskan home shirt.

Period	Kit manufacturer	Shirt sponsor (chest)
1976–1979	(Germany) Adidas	None
1980	(Germany) Adidas	MasterCharge
1981	(Germany) Adidas	Köpkort
1982	(Germany) Adidas	None
1983	(Germany) Adidas	Atari
1984–1987	(Germany) Adidas	Året Runt
1988	(United States) Nike	QC Business Card
1989	(United States) Nike	Mita Copiers
1990–1992	(Germany) Adidas	Mita Copiers
1993	(Germany) Adidas	ICA Kundkort
1994–1996	(Germany) Adidas	Graphium
1997	(Germany) Adidas	"Nej till våld och droger!"
1998	(Germany) Adidas	HP
1999	(Germany) Adidas	Bewator
2000–2004	(Germany) Adidas	Kaffeknappen; ICA (In European tournaments 2002–2004)
2005–2012	(Germany) Adidas	ICA
2013	(Germany) Adidas	Djurgårdsandan
2014–2023	(Germany) Adidas	Prioritet Finans
2024–	(Germany) Adidas	Mobill

== Stadiums ==
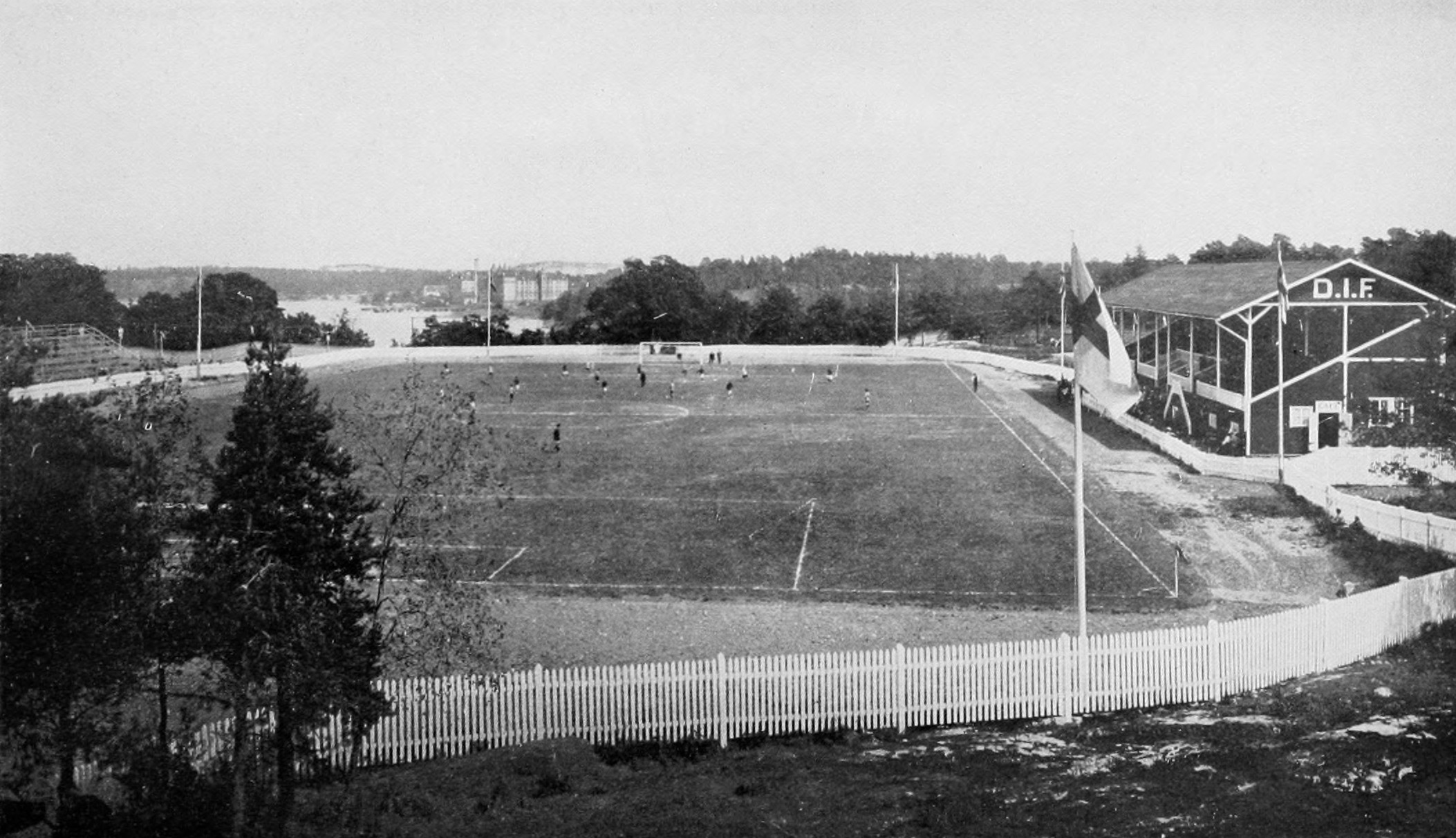
Tranebergs IP (1911–1936)

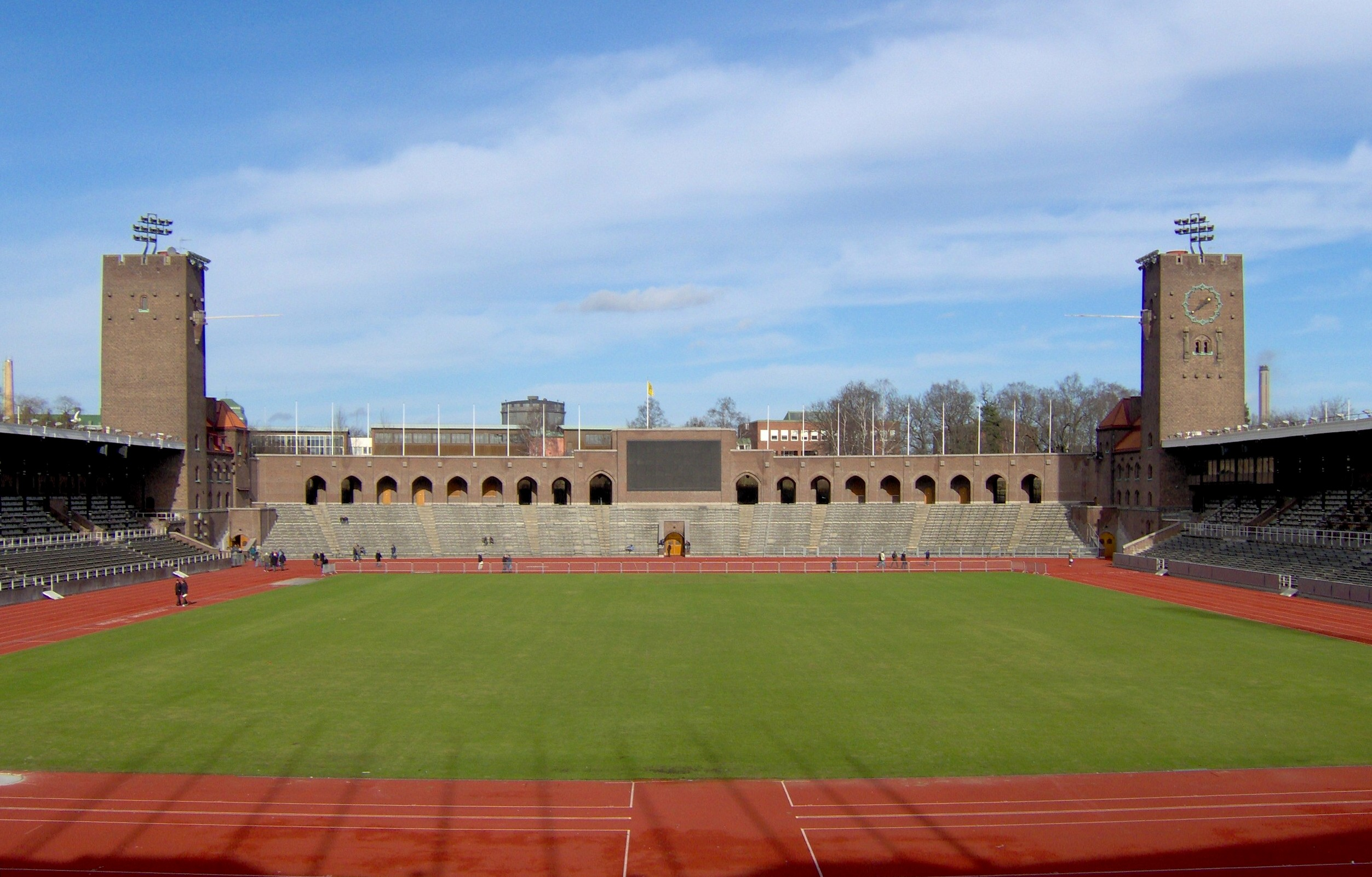
Stockholms Stadion (1936–2013)

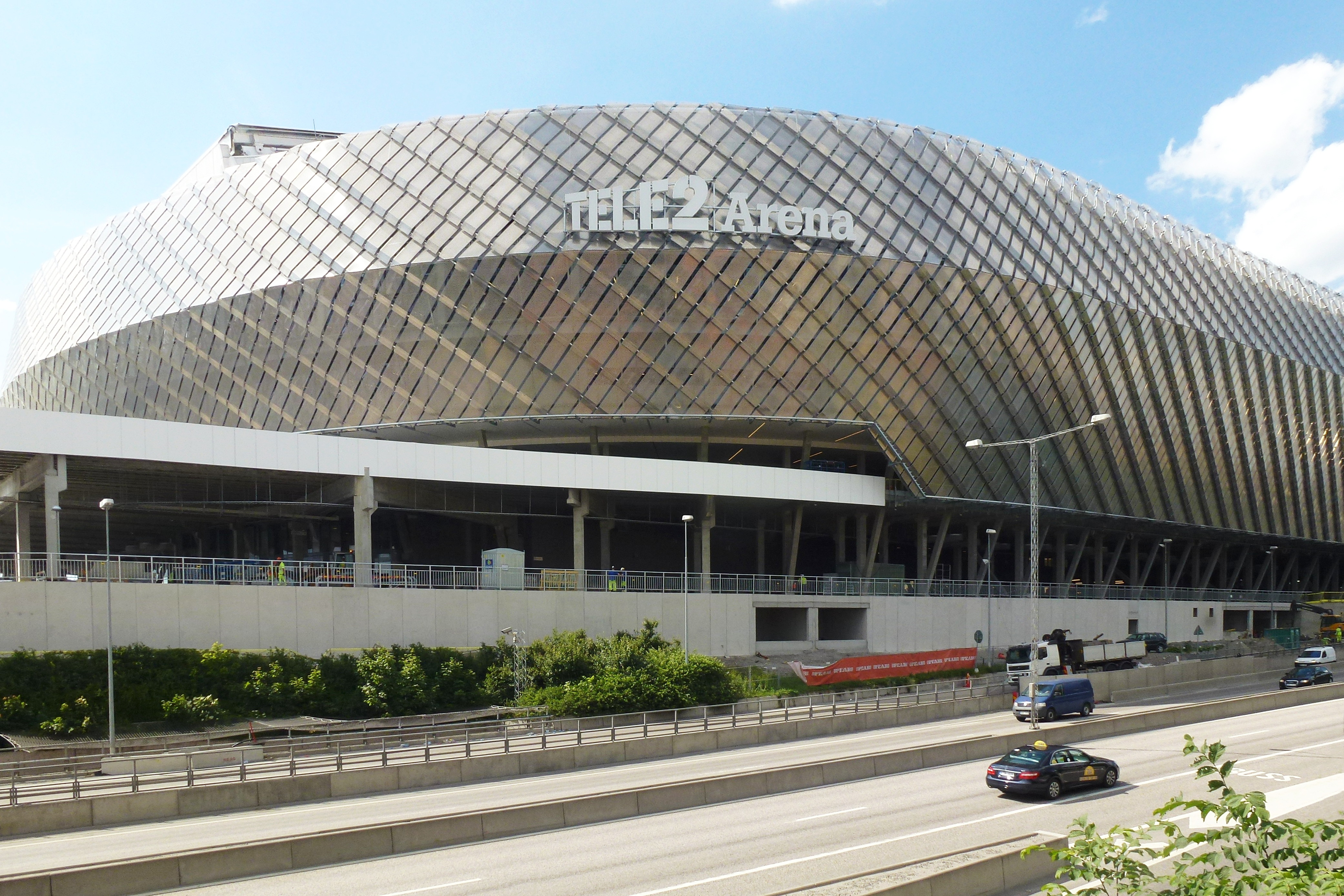
3Arena (2013–)

Djurgården's primary stadium since 2013 is 3Arena, which was named Tele2 Arena until 2025. The club's first match at 3Arena was a 1–2 defeat to IFK Norrköping on 31 July 2013, which drew 27,798 people. The current record attendance at 3Arena is 28,258 versus Örebro SK on the last home game of the 2019 season.

Between 1936 and 2013, Djurgården's home ground was Stockholm Olympic Stadium, where the national league and cup games were played. Their secondary venue was Råsunda Stadium, where Stockholm derbies against AIK and Hammarby IF were played. The old Olympic Stadium, built in 1912, didn't fulfil UEFA's stadium requirements and therefore international cup games were also played at Råsunda. The club's record attendance at the Olympic Stadium is at least 21,995 against AIK on 16 August 1946. (Note: Djurgården's record at Stockholm Olympic Stadium is disputed. Gänger, 2006, suggest the attendance was 21,995 while Rehnberg, 1991, suggest it was 22,108.) Djurgården's record attendance at Råsunda is 50,750 against IFK Göteborg on 11 October 1959.

The club's first stadium was Stockholms idrottspark where the club played from 1899 until 1906, when it moved to the newly built Östermalms IP. However, in August 1910 Djurgården signed a 25-year contract with the Stockholm City Council to build a stadium in Traneberg, a district west of the inner city. Tranebergs Idrottsplats was finished in October 1911 and inaugurated by Crown Prince Gustaf Adolf. The contract expired in 1935, and with the City Council intending to establish residential housing on the site, Djurgården moved to the Stockholm Olympic Stadium in 1936, where the club had played previously on several occasions after the construction of the stadium in 1912.

As attendances increased in the latter half of the 1940s, the club decided to play some games at the newer and larger Råsunda Stadium. And as Djurgården climbed in the league table at the beginning of the 1950s, all games were played at Råsunda. But by the end of the 1960s, Djurgården returned to the Olympic stadium, and soon all games were played there, with the exception of derbies.

The club's achievements in the early 2000s drew larger attendances which led Djurgården to plan for a new stadium with modern facilities and individual seats. Along with political promises in 2006, Djurgården aimed for a rehaul of Stockholm Olympic Stadium and later an entirely new stadium at Östermalms IP. These plans were abandoned in December 2011 as the building costs exceeded the club's financial capabilities. New stadium requirements from the Swedish Football Association also did not allow Djurgården to play at the Olympic Stadium after 2013. Thus, the club board made the decision to move to 3Arena, then named Tele2 Arena, for the 2013 season,.

== Youth academy ==
The youth academy is located at Hjorthagens IP. In December 2012, an indoor arena named "Johan Björkmans hall" with one regulation-size turf and two smaller turfs was built at Hjorthagens IP which enables football training all year around. In 2007 Djurgården invested SEK 65 million (about €7 million) in their youth academy, which former director of sports, Göran Aral, described as a unique investment by a Swedish club. In 2015 the training ground for the first team was renovated which enabled the U17 and U19 teams to be training at Kaknäs IP and therefore come closer to the first team. The academy has produced players like Simon Tibbling, Emil Bergström, Christian Rubio Sivodedov and Samuel Leach Holm.

== Players ==
=== First-team squad ===
As of 4 September 2026

Note: Flags indicate national team as defined under FIFA eligibility rules; some limited exceptions apply. Players may hold more than one non-FIFA nationality.

No.	Pos.	Nation	Player
2	DF	SWE	Piotr Johansson
4	DF	SWE	Jacob Une (captain)
5	DF	FIN	Miro Tenho
6	MF	DEN	Peter Langhoff
7	MF	GRE	Christos Almyras
8	MF	SWE	Patric Åslund
9	FW	NOR	Kristian Lien
10	FW	ENG	Abdul Abdulmalik
11	FW	SWE	Oskar Fallenius
13	MF	SWE	Daniel Stensson
14	FW	SWE	Charlie Rosenqvist
16	FW	NOR	Bo Hegland
18	DF	FIN	Adam Ståhl

No.	Pos.	Nation	Player
19	MF	DEN	Jeppe Okkels
20	MF	FIN	Matias Siltanen
21	DF	SWE	Mikael Marqués
23	DF	BRA	Lucca Gentil
24	DF	SWE	Max Larsson
25	DF	GER	Daryl Tschoumy Nana
26	FW	NGR	Angelo Agbejoye
27	FW	NOR	Sander Ringberg
28	MF	SWE	Alexander Andersson
29	MF	SWE	Alexander Johansson
30	GK	SWE	Lukas Jonsson
35	GK	SWE	Jacob Rinne
40	GK	SWE	Max Croon

=== Out on loan ===
Note: Flags indicate national team as defined under FIFA eligibility rules; some limited exceptions apply. Players may hold more than one non-FIFA nationality.

No.	Pos.	Nation	Player
3	DF	SWE	Leon Hien (at Tromsø until 31 December 2026)
17	MF	SWE	Ahmed Saeed (at FC Arlanda until 31 December 2026)
23	FW	SLO	Nino Žugelj (at IFK Göteborg until 31 December 2026)
—	MF	SWE	Vincent Larsson (at Enskede IK until 31 December 2026)
—	MF	SWE	Abdirahim Abdulle (at FC Järfälla until 31 December 2026)

No.	Pos.	Nation	Player
37	DF	SWE	Carl Selfvén (at IFK Stocksund until 31 December 2026)
45	GK	SRB	Filip Manojlović (at Start until 31 December 2026)
—	FW	SWE	Kalipha Jawla (at Östers IF until 31 December 2026)
—	MF	SWE	Milian Jansson (at Karlbergs BK until 31 December 2026)

=== Youth players with first-team experience ===
As of 12 August 2026 (Note: Current youth players who at least have sat on the bench in a competitive match.)

Note: Flags indicate national team as defined under FIFA eligibility rules; some limited exceptions apply. Players may hold more than one non-FIFA nationality.

No.	Pos.	Nation	Player
27	DF	SWE	Melvin Vucenovic Persson
38	FW	SWE	Hannes Hyllenbom

=== Notable players ===
List criteria:

- player has been named Allsvenskan top scorer of the year, or
- player has won Guldbollen, or
- player is one of the 12 players named as "DIF-heroes" on the official club website. or
- player has gained 100 caps or more for his country.

Name	Djurgården career	Total appearances	Total goals	Honours
(Sweden) Hasse Jeppson	1948–51	51	58	Allsvenskan top scorer: 1951
(Sweden) Sigge Parling	1949–60	200	12	2 Swedish Championships
(Sweden) Gösta Sandberg	1951–66	328	79	4 Swedish Championships; Guldbollen: 1956
(Sweden) John Eriksson	1951–60	123	72	2 Swedish Championships
(Sweden) Arne Arvidsson	1952–65	269	0	3 Swedish Championships
(Sweden) Hans Mild	1957–65	160	6	2 Swedish Championships; Guldbollen: 1964
(Sweden) Olle Hellström	1957–64; 1968	129	4	2 Swedish Championships
(Sweden) Leif Skiöld	1960–65	75	60	1 Swedish Championships; Allsvenskan top scorer: 1962
(Sweden) Ronney Pettersson	1960–70	123	0	1 Swedish Championships
(Sweden) Sven Lindman	1965–68; 1969–80	326	49	1 Swedish Championships
(Sweden) Tommy Berggren	1968–84	299	55	Allsvenskan top scorer: 1978
(Sweden) Vito Knežević	1977–88	242	18	
(Sweden) Leif Nilsson	1984–92	215	5	1 Svenska Cupen
(Sweden) Stefan Rehn	1984–89; 2000–02	210	52	1 Swedish Championships; 1 Svenska Cupen
(Sweden) Andreas Isaksson	2001–04; 2016–2018	163	0	2 Swedish Championships; 2 Svenska Cupen; 133 games for Sweden national team
(Sweden) Kim Källström	2002–03; 2017	96	34	2 Swedish Championships; 1 Svenska Cupen; 131 games for Sweden national team
(Sweden) Magnus Eriksson	2016–17; 2020–25	208	32	Allsvenskan top scorer: 2017
(Sierra Leone) Mohamed Buya Turay	2019	29	15	1 Swedish Championships; Allsvenskan top scorer: 2019
(Denmark) August Priske	2024-26	35	18	Allsvenskan top scorer: 2025

== Management and boardroom ==
=== Management ===
A list of the staff working with and around the first team squad.

As of 15 October 2026:

Name	Role	
(Germany) Maximilian Hahn	Head of football	
(Sweden) Agon Mehmeti	Interim head coach	Transition coach
(Hungary) Abel Lorincz	Interim head coach	Analyst
(Sweden) Hannes Grönblad	Interim head coach	Under 19's coach
(Greece) Nikos Gkoulios	Goalkeeping coach	
(England) Josh Ewens	Head of performance	
(Sweden) Stefan Söderfjäll	Head of Human Development	
(Sweden) Jens Ericsson	Fitness coach	
(Sweden) Kalle Barrling	Naprapath	
(Sweden) Anton Virdebrant	Naprapath/orthopedist	
(Sweden) Simone Cullura	Physio	
(Sweden) Johan Bergling	Physician/doctor	
(Sweden) Håkan Nyberg	Physician/doctor	
(Sweden) Bengt Sparrelind	Physician/doctor	
(Sweden) Martin Turesson	Physician/doctor	
(Sweden) Daniel Granqvist	Player manager	
(Sweden) Patrik Eklöf	Kit manager	

=== Boardroom ===
As of March 2026:

Name	Role
(Sweden) Erik Gozzi	Chairman
(Sweden) Markus Johannesson	Boardmember
(Sweden) Petra Wester	Boardmember
(Sweden) Cecilia Lannebo	Boardmember
(Sweden) Carola Määttä	Boardmember
(Sweden) Mikael Pawlo	Boardmember
(Sweden) Claes-Göran Sylvén	Boardmember
(Sweden) Johan Winterstam	Boardmember
(Sweden) Christian Zeuchner	Boardmember
(Sweden) Pelle Kotschack	Honorary boardmember

== Managerial history ==
It is not known for sure who was the team's manager until 1922, though it is believed that Birger Möller was in charge during a part of the club's first decades.

Years	Manager
1922	(Scotland) John Smith Maconnachie
1923–1929	(Sweden) Bertil Nordenskjöld
1929–1932	(Sweden) Samuel Lindqvist
1932–1934	(Sweden) Rudolf Kock (Sweden) Samuel Lindqvist
1935–1944	(Sweden) Einar Svensson
1944–1950	(Sweden) Per Kaufeldt
1950–1954	(Wales) David Astley
1954–1955	(England) Frank Soo
1955–1957	(Sweden) Kjell Cronqvist
1957–1959	(Hungary) Lajos Szendrődi
1959	(Sweden) Birger Sandberg (Sweden) Knut Hallberg
1960	(England) George Raynor
1960–1963	(Austria) Walter Probst
1964–1966	(Sweden) Torsten Lindberg
1967–1971	(Sweden) Gösta Sandberg
1972–1974	(Spain) Antonio Durán
1975–1978	(Sweden) Bengt Persson
1979	(England) Alan Ball Sr. (Note: Ball was fired before Allsvenskan started.)
1979	(Sweden) Gösta Sandberg (Sweden) Lars Arnesson
1980–1981	(Norway) Arve Mokkelbost
1982–1984	(Sweden) Hans Backe
1985–1986	(Sweden) Björn Westerberg
1987–1989	(Sweden) Tommy Söderberg
1990–1991	(Sweden) Lennart Wass
1992	(Sweden) Thomas Lundin

Years	Manager
1993	(Sweden) Bo Petersson
1994–1996	(Sweden) Anders Grönhagen
1997	(Sweden) Roger Lundin
1998–1999	(Sweden) Michael Andersson
1999–2003	(Bosnia and Herzegovina) Zoran Lukić (Sweden) Sören Åkeby
2004	(Bosnia and Herzegovina) Zoran Lukić
2004–2006	(Sweden) Kjell Jonevret
2006	(Sweden) Anders Grönhagen
2007–2008	(Iceland) Siggi Jónsson
2009	(Sweden) Andrée Jeglertz (Bosnia and Herzegovina) Zoran Lukić
2009	(Sweden) Andrée Jeglertz
2010–2011	(Sweden) Lennart Wass (Sweden) Carlos Banda
2012–2013	(Sweden) Magnus Pehrsson (Sweden) Carlos Banda
2012–2013	(Sweden) Magnus Pehrsson
2013	(Sweden) Anders Johansson (interim) (Sweden) Martin Sundgren (interim)
2013	(Norway) Per-Mathias Høgmo
2014–2016	(Sweden) Pelle Olsson
2016	(England) Mark Dempsey (interim)
2017–2018	(Sweden) Özcan Melkemichel
2018–2024	(Sweden) Kim Bergstrand (Sweden) Thomas Lagerlöf
2024	(Sweden) Roberth Björknesjö (interim)
2025–2026	(Finland) Jani Honkavaara

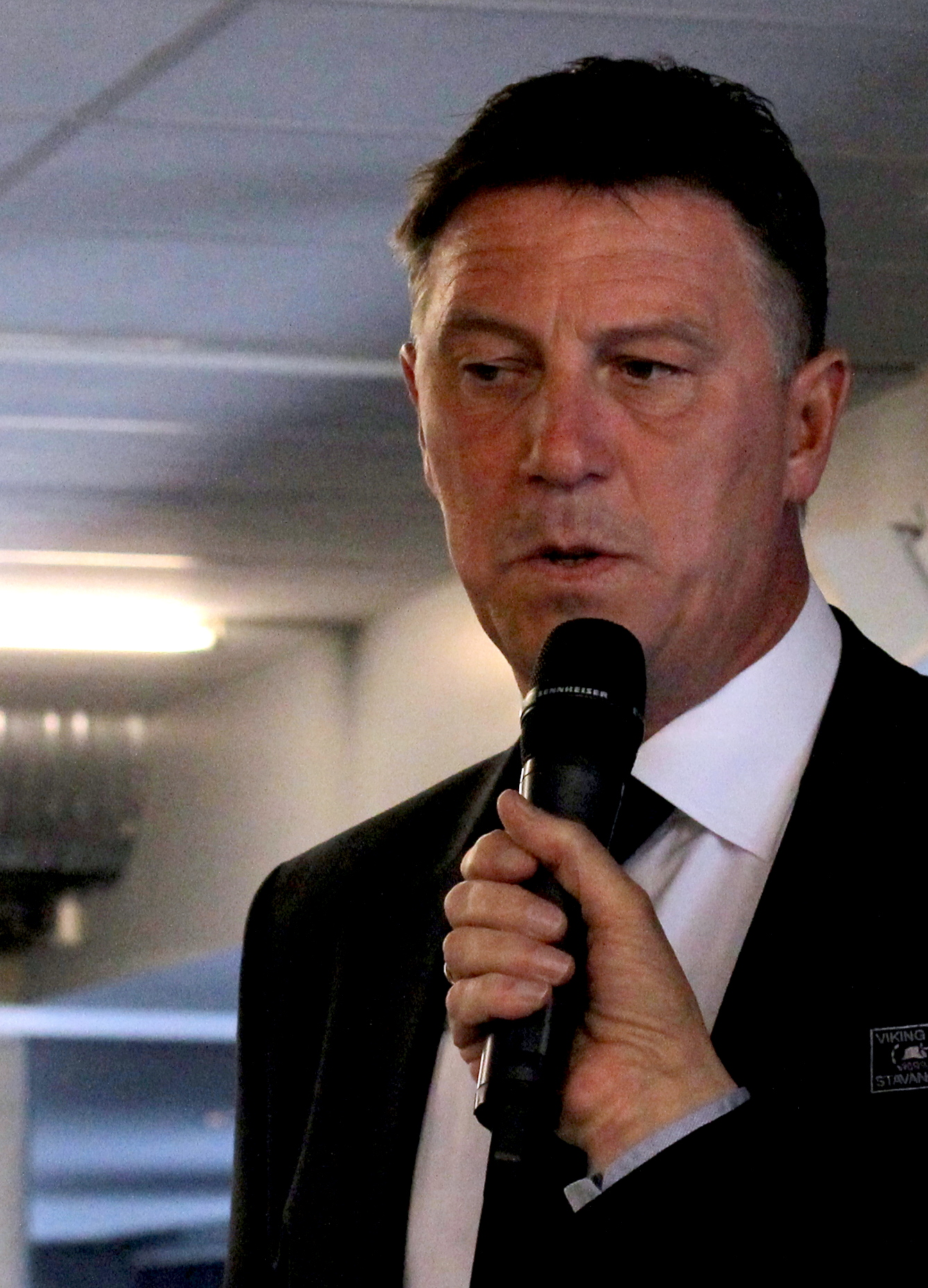
Kjell Jonevret won the league with Djurgården in 2005.

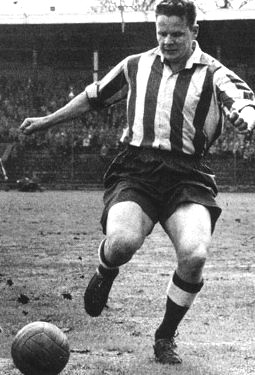
Gösta Sandberg became manager in 1967, the year after he retired as a player for the club.

== Honours ==
- Swedish Champions (Note: The title of "Swedish Champions" has been awarded to the winner of four different competitions over the years. Between 1896 and 1925 the title was awarded to the winner of Svenska Mästerskapet, a stand-alone cup tournament. No club were given the title between 1926 and 1930 even though the first-tier league Allsvenskan was played. In 1931 the title was reinstated and awarded to the winner of Allsvenskan. Between 1982 and 1990 a play-off in cup format was held at the end of the league season to decide the champions. After the play-off format in 1991 and 1992 the title was decided by the winner of Mästerskapsserien, an additional league after the end of Allsvenskan. Since the 1993 season the title has once again been awarded to the winner of Allsvenskan.)
  - Winners (12): 1912, 1915, 1917, 1920, 1954–55, 1959, 1964, 1966, 2002, 2003, 2005, 2019

=== League ===
- Allsvenskan:
  - Winners (8): 1954–55, 1959, 1964, 1966, 2002, 2003, 2005, 2019
  - Runners-up (4): 1962, 1967, 2001, 2022
- Superettan:
  - Winners (1): 2000
- Division 1 Norra:
  - Winners (3): 1987, 1994, 1998
  - Runners-up (1): 1997
- Svenska Serien:
  - Runners-up (1): 1911–12

=== Cups ===
- Svenska Cupen:
  - Winners (5): 1989–90, 2002, 2004, 2005, 2017–18
  - Runners-up (5): 1951, 1974–75, 1988–89, 2012–13, 2023–24
- Svenska Mästerskapet:
  - Winners (4): 1912, 1915, 1917, 1920
  - Runners-up (7): 1904, 1906, 1909, 1910, 1913, 1916, 1919
- Allsvenskan play-offs:
  - Runners-up (1): 1988
- Corinthian Bowl:
  - Winners (1): 1910
  - Runners-up (2): 1908, 1911
- Rosenska Pokalen:
  - Runners-up (1): 1902
- Wicanderska Välgörenhetsskölden:
  - Winners (4): 1907, 1910, 1913, 1915
  - Runners-up (3): 1908, 1914, 1916
- Nordic Cup:
  - Runners-up (1): 1959–62

== Records ==
- Victory, Allsvenskan: 9–1 vs. Hammarby IF (13 August 1990)
- Loss, Allsvenskan: 1–11 vs. IFK Norrköping (14 October 1945)
- Highest attendance, Råsunda Stadium: 50,750 vs. IFK Göteborg (11 October 1959)
- Highest attendance, Stockholms Stadion: 21,995 vs. AIK (16 August 1946)
- Highest attendance, Tele2 Arena: 28,258 vs. Örebro SK (28 October 2019)
- Most appearances, Allsvenskan: 312, Sven Lindman (1965–80)
- Most goals scored, Allsvenskan: 70, Gösta 'Knivsta' Sandberg (1951–66)
- Record transfer fee paid – 38.8 million Swedish krona (27.8 + 11) Charlie Rosenqvist (Summer of 2026) from Kalmar FF
- Record transfer fee received – 113 million Swedish krona, Lucas Bergvall to Tottenham Hotspur (winter of 2024)

=== Most appearances ===
Competitive matches only, includes appearances as substitute. Numbers in brackets indicate goals scored.

#	Name	Years	League	Cup	Europe	Other	Total
1	(Sweden) Gösta Sandberg	1951–1966	322 (77)	0 (0)	6 (1)	0 (1)	328 (79)
2	(Sweden) Sven Lindman	1965–1968; 1969–1980	312 (49)	2 (0)	12 (0)	0 (0)	326 (49)
3	(Bosnia and Herzegovina) Haris Radetinac	2013–2024	241 (22)	42 (9)	29 (1)	0 (0)	312 (32)
4	(Sweden) Tommy Berggren	1968–1984	289 (54)	0 (0)	8 (0)	2 (1)	299 (55)
5	(Sweden) Jacob Une	2016–present	225 (9)	35 (5)	21 (0)	0 (0)	281 (14)
6	(Sweden) Björn Alkeby	1971–1982; 1993	265 (0)	9 (0)	2 (0)	0 (0)	276 (0)
7	(Sweden) Arne Arvidson	1952–1965	263 (0)	6 (0)	0 (0)	0 (0)	269 (0)
8	(Finland) Daniel Sjölund	2003–2012	205 (27)	20 (11)	10 (0)	10 (1)	245 (39)
9	(Sweden) Vito Knežević	1977–1988	236 (17)	0 (0)	0 (0)	6 (1)	242 (18)
10	(The Gambia) Pa Dembo Touray	2000–2011	195 (1)	16 (0)	14 (0)	12 (0)	237 (1)
