= Seasons in Swedish football =

This is a list of seasons in Swedish football, where each article includes the national top league tables in Swedish football, as well as cup results, national team results and a summary of other events during the season.

== History ==
Football was first played in Sweden in the 1870s, but it was not until the 1890s that any regular leagues and tournaments were played. The first Swedish Champions were decided in 1896, and the first national league was played in 1910. The national team played its first international in 1908. The first official premier league, Allsvenskan, was started in 1924. Both the second league, Division 2, and third league, Division 3, became official in 1928.

The national cup, Svenska Cupen, started in 1941, and regular seasons were played during both World Wars. Swedish football seasons changed to spring-autumn style in 1959 after having been played autumn-spring regularly since the early 1910s. Many changes to the format of Allsvenskan were made during the 1980s. Division 1 was introduced as the second highest league in 1987. Division 1 was replaced by Superettan in 2000, but was reintroduced again in 2006 as the third highest league, below Superettan but above Division 2. The Scandinavian Championship, Royal League, was started in 2004 and is played during the winter.

== Seasons ==
19th c:	1870s in Swedish football					1880s in Swedish football				
1890s:	1890	1891	1892	1893	1894	1895	1896	1897	1898	1899
1900s:	1900	1901	1902	1903	1904	1905	1906	1907	1908	1909
1910s:	1910		1911–12	1912–13	1913–14	1914–15	1915–16	1916–17	1918	1919
1920s:		1920–21	1921–22	1922–23	1923–24	1924–25	1925–26	1926–27	1927–28	1928–29
1930s:	1929–30	1930–31	1931–32	1932–33	1933–34	1934–35	1935–36	1936–37	1937–38	1938–39
1940s:	1939–40	1940–41	1941–42	1942–43	1943–44	1944–45	1945–46	1946–47	1947–48	1948–49
1950s:	1949–50	1950–51	1951–52	1952–53	1953–54	1954–55	1955–56	1956–57	1957–58	1959
1960s:	1960	1961	1962	1963	1964	1965	1966	1967	1968	1969
1970s:	1970	1971	1972	1973	1974	1975	1976	1977	1978	1979
1980s:	1980	1981	1982	1983	1984	1985	1986	1987	1988	1989
1990s:	1990	1991	1992	1993	1994	1995	1996	1997	1998	1999
2000s:	2000	2001	2002	2003	2004	2005	2006	2007	2008	2009
2010s:	2010	2011	2012	2013	2014	2015	2016	2017	2018	2019
2020s:	2020	2021	2022	2023	2024					

== Legend ==
Colour	Meaning
	Automatic promotion spot
	Promotion or championship play-off spot
	Promotion due to special reasons
	League transfer within league level
	End of season spot
	Relegation due to special reasons
	Relegation play-off spot
	Automatic relegation spot
