= IFK Göteborg league record by opponent =

Idrottsföreningen Kamraterna Göteborg, commonly known as IFK Göteborg, is a Swedish professional football club based in Gothenburg. Founded on 4 October 1904, it is the only club in the Nordic countries that has won a pan-European competition, as the club won the UEFA Cup in 1982 and 1987. They have won 18 Swedish championship titles, second most in Swedish football after Malmö FF. IFK is affiliated with Göteborgs Fotbollförbund and play their home games at Gamla Ullevi. IFK Göteborg play in Allsvenskan as of the 2018 season, where they have played for the majority of their history. They have played in the Swedish first tier continuously since 1977, which is the longest ongoing top-flight tenure in Sweden.

IFK Göteborg's first team has competed in a number of nationally contested leagues, and its record against each club faced in these competitions is listed below. The team that IFK Göteborg have met the most times in league competition are AIK against whom IFK have contested 187 league matches. AIK are also the team against whom IFK Göteborg have won the most league matches, 94 in total. Malmö FF are the team against whom IFK have drawn and lost the most league matches, with 40 and 63 respectively. The club against whom IFK Göteborg have scored the most is AIK, who have conceded 342 times against IFK in league competition. AIK are also the most prolific goalscorers against IFK Göteborg in league competition, they have scored 285 times in the clubs' 187 league meetings.

== Key ==
- The records include the results of matches played in Göteborgsserien klass 1 (1905 to 1907), Svenska Serien (1910 to 1916–17 and 1920–21 to 1923–24), Fyrkantserien (1918 and 1919), Allsvenskan (1924–25 to 1937–38, 1939–40 to 1949–50, 1951–52 to 1970, and 1977 to present), Division 2 (1938–39, 1950–51, and 1971–1976), and Mästerskapsserien (1991 and 1992).
- The records do not include the results of matches played in Göteborgsserien klass 1 play-offs (1906), Allsvenskan qualification play-offs (1938–39 and 2002), or Allsvenskan play-offs (1982 to 1988 and 1990).
- To avoid confusion, present-day names of opponents are used throughout. Each club's former names (if any) are given in the list notes.
- The season given as the "first" denotes the season in which IFK Göteborg first played a league match against that team.
- The season given as the "last" designates the most recent season to have included a league match between IFK Göteborg and that side. Current divisional rivals that the club has never met in the league have a blank entry, indicating that the first league meeting of the season has not yet taken place.

	Overall record
Pld	Games played
W	Games won
D	Games drawn
L	Games lost
GF	Goals for
GA	Goals against
GD	Goal difference
Win%	Percentage of total games won

	Cell coding
†	Club is a current divisional rival of IFK Göteborg as of the 2018 Allsvenskan season.
‡	Club is defunct.

== Overall record ==
As of 29 December 2017

Club	Home				Away				Total							Win%	First	Last	Notes
Club	Pld	W	D	L	Pld	W	D	L	Pld	W	D	L	GF	GA	GD	Win%	First	Last	Notes
AIK†	94	62	14	18	93	32	21	40	187	94	35	58	342	285	+57	50.3	1910	2017	
Arvika BK‡	1	1	0	0	1	1	0	0	2	2	0	0	13	1	+12	100.0	1938–39	1938–39	
IFK Arvika‡	1	0	0	1	1	0	0	1	2	0	0	2	0	3	−3	0.0	1971	1971	
Assyriska FF	1	0	0	1	1	1	0	0	2	1	0	1	3	5	−2	50.0	2005	2005	
Billingsfors IK	2	2	0	0	2	2	0	0	4	4	0	0	11	2	+9	100.0	1938–39	1946–47	
Blomstermåla IK	3	1	0	2	3	3	0	0	6	4	0	2	19	10	+9	66.7	1972	1975	
Bohus BK‡	1	0	0	1	1	1	0	0	2	1	0	1	6	6	+0	50.0	1905	1905	
IK Brage	17	10	4	3	17	9	2	6	34	19	6	9	60	39	+21	55.9	1937–38	1993	
IF Brommapojkarna†	5	3	2	0	5	3	1	1	10	6	3	1	19	6	+13	60.0	2007	2014	
Dalkurd FF†	0	0	0	0	0	0	0	0	0	0	0	0	0	0	+0	—			
Degerfors IF	28	17	5	6	28	14	6	8	56	31	11	14	107	81	+26	55.4	1940–41	1997	
Deje IK	1	1	0	0	1	1	0	0	2	2	0	0	4	1	+3	100.0	1938–39	1938–39	
BK Derby	1	1	0	0	1	0	1	0	2	1	1	0	4	1	+3	50.0	1977	1977	
Djurgårdens IF†	66	36	11	19	64	19	17	28	130	55	28	47	215	199	+16	42.3	1911–12	2017	
IF Elfsborg†	68	33	22	13	68	18	14	36	136	51	36	49	193	204	−11	37.5	1926–27	2017	
Emmaboda IS	3	2	0	1	3	2	1	0	6	4	1	1	18	6	+12	66.7	1974	1976	
Enköpings SK	1	1	0	0	1	1	0	0	2	2	0	0	4	0	+4	100.0	2003	2003	
AFC Eskilstuna	1	0	1	0	1	0	0	1	2	0	1	1	1	2	−1	0.0	2017	2017	
Eskilstuna City FK	1	1	0	0	1	0	1	0	2	1	1	0	10	4	+6	50.0	1925–26	1925–26	(Note: Records include results against IK City.)
IFK Eskilstuna	2	13	2	2	16	10	1	5	33	23	3	7	114	47	+67	69.7	1910	1964	
Falkenbergs FF	3	3	0	0	3	2	0	1	6	5	0	1	9	3	+6	83.3	2014	2016	
IFK Falköping	1	1	0	0	1	1	0	0	2	2	0	0	6	0	+6	100.0	1974	1974	
Fässbergs IF	1	1	0	0	1	0	1	0	2	1	1	0	7	0	+7	50.0	1938–39	1938–39	
GAIS	58	28	14	16	57	27	15	15	115	55	29	31	206	134	+72	47.8	1905	2012	(Note: Records do not include one game (a 0–0 away draw) in 1922–23 as the match was subsequently annulled and replayed.)
Gefle IF	16	11	4	1	16	7	4	5	32	18	8	6	66	31	+35	56.3	1933–34	2016	
Grimsås IF	5	3	0	2	5	2	1	2	10	5	1	4	15	13	+2	50.0	1971	1976	
Gårda BK	7	4	3	0	7	3	2	2	14	7	5	2	27	12	+15	50.0	1935–36	1942–43	
Göteborgs FF	2	1	1	0	2	0	1	1	4	1	2	1	7	7	+0	25.0	1910	1911–12	
Göteborgs IF‡	1	1	0	0	1	1	0	0	2	2	0	0	4	2	+2	100.0	1906	1906	(Note: Records include one game won in 1906 with unknown result.)
IFK Göteborg 2	0	0	0	0	0	0	0	0	0	0	0	0	0	0	+0	—	1907	1907	(Note: Records do not include two games played in 1907 with unknown results.)
Hallstahammars SK	1	1	0	0	1	1	0	0	2	2	0	0	10	1	+9	100.0	1931–32	1931–32	
IS Halmia	17	13	3	1	17	9	5	3	34	22	8	4	77	33	+44	64.7	1932–33	1979	
Halmstads BK	52	30	14	8	53	20	15	18	105	50	29	26	201	124	+77	47.6	1933–34	2017	
Hammarby IF†	44	30	9	5	44	12	14	18	88	42	23	23	176	114	+62	47.7	1920–21	2017	
Helsingborgs IF	71	29	23	19	72	29	12	31	143	58	35	50	237	206	+31	40.6	1916–17	2016	
IFK Holmsund	1	1	0	0	1	1	0	0	2	2	0	0	8	1	+7	100.0	1967	1967	
Hovås Billdal IF	1	1	0	0	1	1	0	0	2	2	0	0	6	3	+3	100.0	1971	1971	(Note: Records include results against Hovås IF.)
Huskvarna Södra IS	1	1	0	0	1	1	0	0	2	2	0	0	9	3	+6	100.0	1950–51	1950–51	
BK Häcken†	17	10	6	1	17	9	3	5	34	19	9	6	71	41	+30	55.9	1983	2017	
Hässleholms IF	3	2	1	0	3	1	0	2	6	3	1	2	13	10	+3	50.0	1972	1974	
IFK Hässleholm	2	1	0	1	2	2	0	0	4	3	0	1	7	4	+3	75.0	1975	1976	
Högadals IS	1	1	0	0	1	1	0	0	2	2	0	0	9	4	+5	100.0	1962	1962	
Höganäs BK	1	1	0	0	1	0	0	1	2	1	0	1	3	2	+1	50.0	1950–51	1950–51	
Jonsereds GIF‡	0	0	0	0	0	0	0	0	0	0	0	0	0	0	+0	—	1907	1907	(Note: Records do not include two games played in 1907 with unknown results.)
Jonsereds IF	1	1	0	0	1	1	0	0	2	2	0	0	3	1	+2	100.0	1938–39	1938–39	
Jönköpings Södra IF	15	8	6	1	15	9	3	3	30	17	9	4	67	29	+38	56.7	1945–46	2017	
Kalmar FF†	32	17	9	6	32	13	8	11	64	30	17	17	106	77	+29	46.9	1949–50	2017	
Karlskoga IF‡	1	1	0	0	1	1	0	0	2	2	0	0	8	0	+8	100.0	1938–39	1938–39	
KB Karlskoga FF	3	2	1	0	3	2	0	1	6	4	1	1	16	4	+12	66.7	1971	1976	
Karlstad BK	1	0	1	0	1	1	0	0	2	1	1	0	3	2	+1	50.0	1971	1971	
IFK Kristianstad‡	2	1	1	0	2	1	0	1	4	2	1	1	7	7	+0	50.0	1973	1974	
Krokslätts IK‡	1	1	0	0	1	1	0	0	2	2	0	0	3	1	+2	100.0	1906	1907	(Note: Records include one game won in 1906 with unknown result. Records do not include two games played in 1907 with unknown results.)
Kungshamns IF	1	0	1	0	1	1	0	0	2	1	1	0	3	0	+3	50.0	1972	1972	
Landskrona BoIS	29	21	5	3	29	16	9	4	58	37	14	7	140	68	+72	63.8	1923–24	2005	
Ljungskile SK	2	1	1	0	2	1	0	1	4	2	1	1	6	4	+2	50.0	1997	2008	(Note: Records include results against Panos Ljungskile SK.)
Ludvika FK	1	1	0	0	1	1	0	0	2	2	0	0	9	3	+6	100.0	1944–45	1944–45	(Note: Records include results against Ludvika FfI.)
Lunds BK	1	0	0	1	1	1	0	0	2	1	0	1	5	4	+1	50.0	1950–51	1950–51	
Malmö FF†	77	27	22	28	78	25	18	35	155	52	40	63	234	247	−13	33.5	1922–23	2017	(Note: Records do not include two games (a 5–0 home win and a 3–1 away win) in 1933–34 as Malmö FF were disqualified during the season. Records include one game lost in 2016 as it was abandoned with match result set to 0–3.)
IFK Malmö	22	18	1	3	23	6	6	11	45	24	7	14	101	57	+44	53.3	1920–21	1976	
Mjällby AIF	8	4	3	1	8	2	3	3	16	6	6	4	21	15	+6	37.5	1980	2014	
Motala AIF	3	3	0	0	2	1	1	0	5	4	1	0	18	7	+11	80.0	1957–58	1976	
Norrby IF	3	2	0	1	3	2	1	0	6	4	1	1	12	7	+5	66.7	1950–51	1976	
IFK Norrköping†	80	41	17	22	81	31	16	34	161	72	33	56	312	250	+62	44.7	1910	2017	
IK Oddevold	1	1	0	0	1	1	0	0	2	2	0	0	7	1	+6	100.0	1996	1996	
Perstorps SK	1	1	0	0	1	1	0	0	2	2	0	0	7	2	+5	100.0	1972	1972	
Redbergslids IK‡	1	0	1	0	1	1	0	0	2	1	1	0	7	2	+5	50.0	1930–31	1930–31	
Reymersholms IK	1	1	0	0	1	0	1	0	2	1	1	0	5	2	+3	50.0	1941–42	1941–42	
Råå IF	2	2	0	0	2	1	1	0	4	3	1	0	10	4	+6	75.0	1951–52	1976	
Sandvikens AIK	1	1	0	0	1	1	0	0	2	2	0	0	7	3	+4	100.0	1954–55	1954–55	
Sandvikens IF	21	14	1	6	20	9	8	3	41	23	9	9	98	56	+42	56.1	1929–30	1961	(Note: Records include one game lost on walkover in 1930–31 with match result set to 0–0.)
IK Sirius†	2	2	0	0	2	2	0	0	4	4	0	0	13	3	+10	100.0	1969	2017	
Skogens IF	1	1	0	0	1	0	1	0	2	1	1	0	2	1	+1	50.0	1972	1972	
Skövde AIK	4	3	1	0	4	3	1	0	8	6	2	0	15	6	+9	75.0	1971	1975	
IK Sleipner	16	13	2	1	16	6	4	6	32	19	6	7	91	41	+50	59.4	1924–25	1973	
Stattena IF	2	2	0	0	2	2	0	0	4	4	0	0	21	2	+19	100.0	1927–28	1929–30	
GIF Sundsvall†	16	9	4	3	16	5	7	4	32	14	11	7	51	31	+20	43.8	1965	2017	
IFK Sundsvall	4	2	1	1	4	2	1	1	8	4	2	2	15	6	+9	50.0	1977	1981	
Syrianska FC	3	3	0	0	3	2	0	1	6	5	0	1	11	3	+8	83.3	2011	2013	
Tidaholms GIF	1	1	0	0	1	0	1	0	2	1	1	0	4	2	+2	50.0	1938–39	1938–39	
Trelleborgs FF†	18	13	2	3	18	5	7	6	36	18	9	9	64	40	+24	50.0	1985	2011	
IFK Trelleborg	2	2	0	0	2	1	1	0	4	3	1	0	12	3	+9	75.0	1972	1973	
Trollhättans IF	3	2	1	0	3	1	2	0	6	3	3	0	23	9	+14	50.0	1974	1976	
IFK Uddevalla	2	1	0	1	2	1	1	0	4	2	1	1	5	6	−1	50.0	1925–26	1926–27	
Umeå FC	1	1	0	0	1	0	1	0	2	1	1	0	5	1	+4	50.0	1996	1996	
IFK Uppsala	2	2	0	0	2	2	0	0	4	4	0	0	14	5	+9	100.0	1912–13	1913–14	
Varbergs BoIS	1	0	0	1	1	1	0	0	2	1	0	1	4	4	+0	50.0	1938–39	1938–39	
IK Viking‡	3	3	0	0	2	2	0	0	5	5	0	0	17	2	+15	100.0	1905	1907	(Note: Records include one game won on walkover in 1905 with match result set to 0–0. Records include one game won in 1906 with unknown result. Records do not include one game played in 1907 with unknown result.)
Vikingarnas FK‡	1	1	0	0	1	1	0	0	2	2	0	0	3	2	+1	100.0	1910	1910	(Note: Records include one game won on walkover in 1910 with match result set to 0–0.)
Västerås IK	1	1	0	0	1	1	0	0	2	2	0	0	13	2	+11	100.0	1924–25	1924–25	
Västerås SK	4	3	0	1	4	3	0	1	8	6	0	2	18	8	+10	75.0	1955–56	1997	
Västmanland-Nerikes BK‡	1	1	0	0	1	0	0	1	2	1	0	1	7	2	+5	50.0	1910	1910	(Note: Records include one game lost on walkover in 1910 with match result set to 0–0.)
Västra Frölunda IF	14	6	3	5	14	7	4	3	28	13	7	8	50	31	+19	46.4	1971	2000	
Westermalms IF	2	2	0	0	2	1	0	1	4	3	0	1	17	4	+13	75.0	1926–27	1928–29	
IFK Ystad	1	1	0	0	1	0	0	1	2	1	0	1	2	3	−1	50.0	1972	1972	
Åtvidabergs FF	14	11	1	2	14	5	5	4	28	16	6	6	53	27	+26	57.1	1951–52	2015	
Örebro SK†	43	26	10	7	43	16	14	13	86	42	24	20	176	108	+68	48.8	1946–47	2017	
Örgryte IS	65	29	16	20	65	40	9	16	130	69	25	36	254	185	+69	53.1	1905	2009	
Örgryte IS 2	1	0	1	0	1	0	0	1	2	0	1	1	1	4	−3	0.0	1906	1907	(Note: Records do not include two games played in 1907 with unknown results.)
Östers IF	28	15	7	6	28	8	10	10	56	23	17	16	87	70	+17	41.1	1968	2013	
Östersunds FK†	2	1	0	1	2	0	1	1	4	1	1	2	3	4	−1	25.0	2016	2017	
