= Malmö FF league record by opponent =

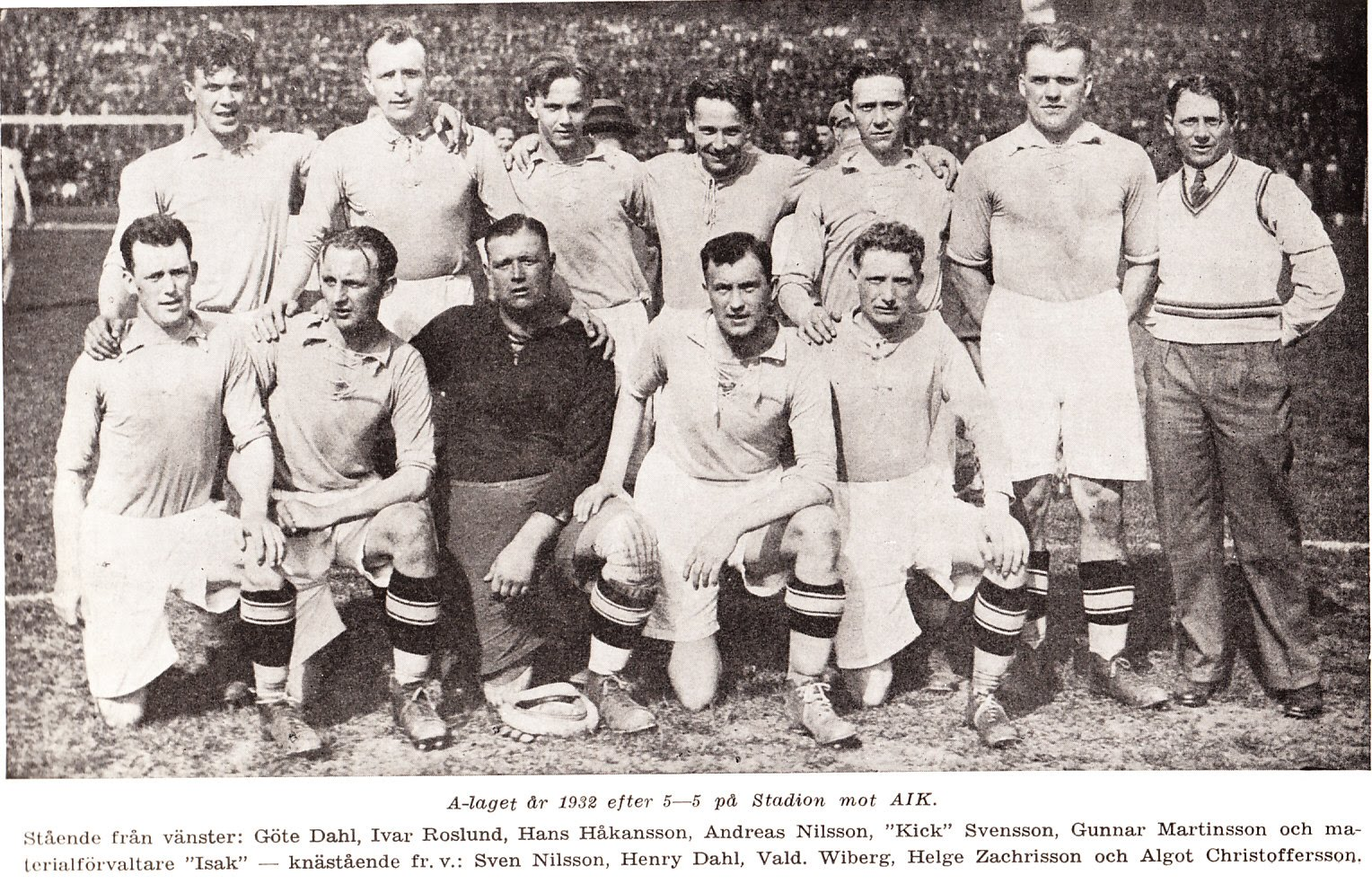
Malmö FF line up after playing AIK for the first time in 1932. The match ended in a 5–5 draw.

Malmö Fotbollförening, also known simply as Malmö FF, is a Swedish professional association football club based in Malmö. The club is affiliated with Skånes Fotbollförbund (The Scanian Football Association), and plays its home games at Stadion. Formed on 24 February 1910, Malmö FF is the most successful club in Sweden in terms of trophies won. The club have won the most league titles of any Swedish club with twenty-three, a record twenty Swedish championship titles and a record fourteen national cup titles.^{[A]} The team competes in Allsvenskan as of the 2018 season; this is Malmö FF's 18th consecutive season in the top flight, and their 83rd overall. The main rivals of the club are Helsingborgs IF, IFK Göteborg and, historically, IFK Malmö.

Malmö FF's first team has competed in a number of nationally contested leagues, and its record against each club faced in these competitions is listed below. The team that Malmö FF have met the most times in league competition are AIK, from Solna, against whom Malmö FF have contested 161 league matches. AIK are the team against whom Malmö FF have won and drawn the most matches, with 73 and 46 respectively. IFK Göteborg, from Gothenburg, are the team against whom Malmö FF have lost the most league matches, with 52. The club against whom Malmö FF have scored the most is AIK, who have conceded 257 times against Malmö FF in league competition. The most prolific goalscorers against Malmö FF in league competition are IFK Göteborg, who have scored 235 times in the clubs' 155 league meetings.

== Key ==
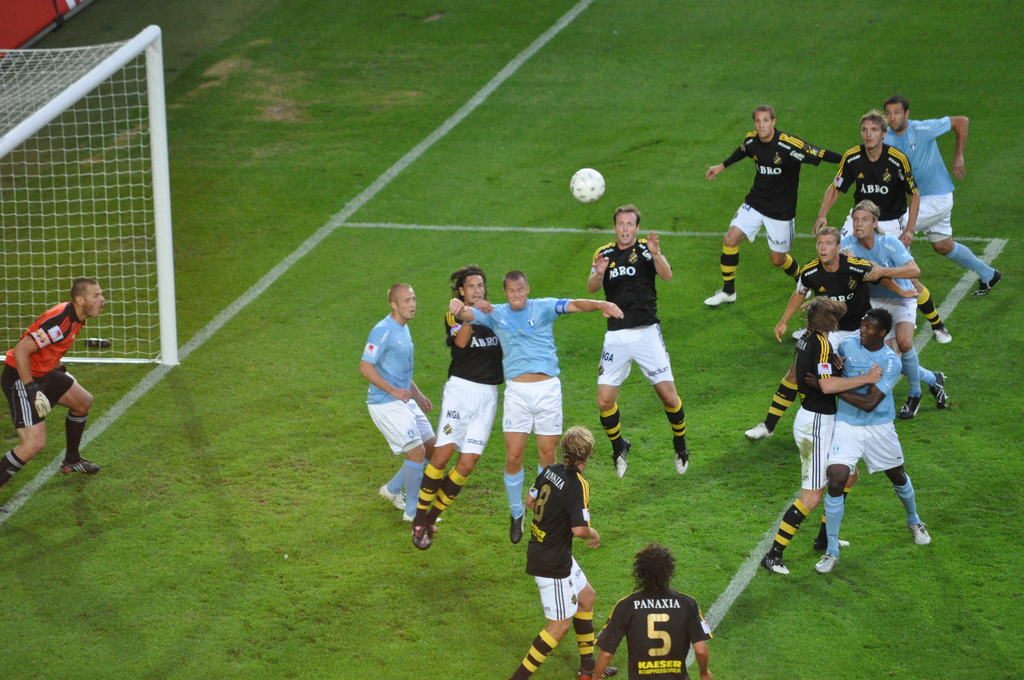
Malmö FF (light blue shirts) take on AIK (black shirts) in 2009

- The records include the results of matches played in Division 2 Sydsvenska Serien (from 1920 to 1921, and then again from 1923 to 1928), Svenska Serien (for the 1922–23 season only), Division 2 Södra (from 1928 to 1931, and then again from 1934 to 1936), Superettan (for the 2000 season only) and in Allsvenskan (from 1931 to 1934, from 1936 to 1999, and then again from 2001 to the present day).
- These statistics do not include results from the Allsvenskan play-offs (held between 1982 and 1990), but those from Mästerskapsserien (held in 1991 and 1992) are included. The Allsvenskan play-off round was held in cup format at the end of the league season to decide the national champions, while Mästerskapsserien was an additional league stage with the same purpose.
- To avoid confusion, present-day names of opponents are used throughout. Each club's former names (if any) are given in this list's footnotes.
- The season given as the "first" denotes the season in which Malmö FF first played a league match against that team.
- The season given as the "last" designates the most recent season to have included a league match between Malmö FF and that side. Current divisional rivals that the club has never met in the league have a blank entry, indicating that the first league meeting of the season has not yet taken place.
- ^{†} Teams with this background and symbol in the "Club" column are current divisional rivals of Malmö FF as of the 2018 Allsvenskan season.
- ^{‡} Clubs with this background and symbol in the "Club" column are defunct.
- P = matches played; W = matches won; D = matches drawn; L = matches lost; GF = Goals scored; GA = Goals conceded; Win% = percentage of total matches won

== All-time league record ==
Statistics correct as of matches played on 5 November 2017.^{[a]}^{[b]}

Club	P	W	D	L	P	W	D	L	P	W	D	L	GF	GA	Win%	First	Last	Notes
Club	(Home)				(Away)				(Total)						Win%	First	Last	Notes
AFC Eskilstuna	2	2	0	0	2	1	0	1	4	3	0	1	10	6	75.0	2000	2017	^{[B]}
AIK^{†}	80	43	22	15	81	30	24	27	161	73	46	42	257	193	45.3	1931–32	2017	
Assyriska FF	2	1	1	0	2	2	0	0	4	3	1	0	7	2	75.0	2000	2005	
Billingsfors IK	1	1	0	0	1	1	0	0	2	2	0	0	11	2	100.0	1946–47	1946–47	
BK Derby	3	2	0	1	3	2	0	1	6	4	0	2	20	6	66.7	1929–30	1977	
BK Häcken^{†}	16	8	3	5	16	6	3	7	32	14	6	12	57	43	43.8	1983	2017	
Brynäs IF	1	1	0	0	1	1	0	0	2	2	0	0	7	0	100.0	1974	1974	
Dalen/Krokslätts FF	2	1	1	0	2	2	0	0	4	3	1	0	15	5	75.0	1928–29	1929–30	^{[C]}
Degerfors IF	29	19	6	4	29	12	6	11	58	31	12	15	108	67	53.4	1938–39	1997	
Djurgårdens IF^{†}	64	31	18	15	63	24	13	26	127	55	31	41	197	161	43.3	1936–37	2017	
Enköpings SK	2	2	0	0	2	1	1	0	4	3	1	0	6	0	75.0	2000	2003	
Falkenbergs FF	6	6	0	0	6	5	1	0	12	11	1	0	51	11	91.7	1923–24	2016	^{[D]}
FC Rosengård	6	3	2	1	6	3	0	3	12	6	2	4	33	27	50.0	1924–25	1935–36	^{[E]}
Fässbergs IF	3	2	0	1	3	1	1	1	6	3	1	2	18	11	50.0	1928–29	1930–31	
GAIS	45	26	11	8	44	19	14	11	89	45	25	19	158	99	50.6	1922–23	2012	
Gefle IF	14	9	5	0	14	7	1	6	28	16	6	6	57	28	57.1	1983	2016	
GIF Sundsvall^{†}	16	11	3	2	16	8	4	4	32	19	7	6	69	26	59.4	1965	2017	
Gunnilse IS	1	1	0	0	1	0	1	0	2	1	1	0	2	0	50.0	2000	2000	
Gårda BK	7	2	4	1	7	0	3	4	14	2	7	5	13	17	14.3	1936–37	1942–43	
Hallstahammars SK	2	2	0	0	2	0	1	1	4	2	1	1	6	7	50.0	1931–32	1938–39	
Halmstads BK	58	38	12	8	59	25	20	14	117	63	32	22	239	137	53.8	1923–24	2017	
Hammarby IF^{†}	47	33	6	8	47	20	13	14	94	53	19	22	183	105	56.4	1939–40	2017	
Helsingborgs IF	58	29	13	16	59	21	16	22	117	50	29	38	208	163	42.7	1922–23	2016	
Husqvarna FF	1	1	0	0	1	0	0	1	2	1	0	1	6	4	50.0	1920–21	1920–21	^{[F]}
Högadals IS	1	0	1	0	1	0	1	0	2	0	2	0	5	5	0.0	1962	1962	
Höganäs BK	2	2	0	0	2	2	0	0	4	4	0	0	15	5	100.0	1934–35	1935–36	
IF Brommapojkarna^{†}	5	4	1	0	5	3	2	0	10	7	3	0	19	6	70.0	2007	2014	
IF Elfsborg^{†}	65	40	15	10	65	29	12	24	130	69	27	34	224	167	53.1	1931–32	2017	
IF Saab^{‡}	1	1	0	0	1	1	0	0	2	2	0	0	2	0	100.0	1973	1973	
IF Sylvia	1	0	1	0	1	0	1	0	2	0	2	0	1	1	0.0	2000	2000	
IFK Eskilstuna	5	3	0	2	6	3	1	2	11	6	1	4	31	21	54.5	1931–32	1964	
IFK Göteborg^{†}	78	35	18	25	77	28	22	27	155	63	40	52	247	235	40.6	1922–23	2017	
IFK Helsingborg^{‡}	8	7	1	0	8	2	2	4	16	9	3	4	45	25	56.3	1920–21	1935–36	
IFK Holmsund	1	1	0	0	1	1	0	0	2	2	0	0	10	0	100.0	1967	1967	
IFK Luleå	1	1	0	0	1	1	0	0	2	2	0	0	5	1	100.0	1971	1971	
IFK Malmö	14	9	2	3	13	6	3	4	27	15	5	7	52	36	55.6	1922–23	1962	
IFK Norrköping^{†}	72	41	18	13	71	18	19	34	143	59	37	47	227	196	41.3	1936–37	2017	
IFK Sundsvall	5	4	0	1	5	3	1	1	10	7	1	2	24	9	70.0	1976	1981	
IFK Uddevalla	2	1	0	1	2	0	1	1	4	1	1	2	9	7	25.0	1928–29	1929–30	
IFK Värnamo	1	1	0	0	1	0	1	0	2	1	1	0	4	1	50.0	1934–35	1934–35	
IK Brage	19	13	3	3	19	9	3	7	38	22	6	10	67	36	57.9	1937–38	2000	
IK Oddevold	1	0	1	0	1	1	0	0	2	1	1	0	4	2	50.0	1996	1996	
IK Sirius^{†}	4	3	1	0	4	1	2	1	8	4	3	1	15	6	50.0	1969	2017	
IK Sleipner	7	3	2	2	7	3	2	2	14	6	4	4	8	3	42.9	1931–32	1940–41	
IS Halmia	21	15	5	1	21	9	6	6	42	24	11	7	102	50	57.1	1920–21	1979	
Jonsereds IF	1	1	0	0	1	1	0	0	2	2	0	0	5	2	100.0	1928–29	1928–29	
Jönköpings IS^{‡}	1	1	0	0	1	1	0	0	2	2	0	0	6	4	100.0	1920–21	1920–21	
Jönköpings Södra IF	12	10	0	2	12	8	3	1	24	18	3	3	84	34	75.0	1945–46	2017	
Kalmar AIK	1	1	0	0	1	1	0	0	2	2	0	0	6	0	100.0	1930–31	1930–31	
Kalmar FF^{†}	35	22	7	6	35	16	9	10	70	38	16	16	114	68	54.3	1927–28	2017	
Kristianstads FF	4	2	1	1	4	2	0	2	8	4	1	3	19	14	50.0	1927–28	1935–36	^{[G]}
Landskrona BoIS	27	17	7	3	27	11	6	10	54	28	13	13	105	59	51.9	1920–21	2005	
Landskrona IF^{‡}	1	1	0	0	1	0	1	0	2	1	1	0	10	6	50.0	1927–28	1927–28	
Lessebo GOIF	1	1	0	0	1	1	0	0	2	2	0	0	10	0	100.0	1935–36	1935–36	^{[H]}
Ljungskile SK	3	2	1	0	3	3	0	0	6	5	1	0	11	4	83.3	1997	2008	^{[I]}
Ludvika FK	1	0	1	0	1	0	0	1	2	0	1	1	2	3	0.0	1944–45	1944–45	^{[J]}
Lunds BK	4	2	0	2	4	3	1	0	8	5	1	2	28	15	62.5	1924–25	1934–35	
Mjällby AIF	9	6	3	0	9	1	6	2	18	7	9	2	27	19	38.9	1980	2014	
Motala AIF	1	0	1	0	2	1	0	1	3	1	1	1	2	4	33.3	1957–58	1957–58	
Norrby IF	1	1	0	0	1	0	1	0	2	1	1	0	5	1	50.0	1955–56	1955–56	
Ramlösa Södra FF	1	0	0	1	1	0	0	1	2	0	0	2	5	8	0.0	1930–31	1930–31	^{[K]}
Redbergslids IK^{‡}	2	1	0	1	2	1	0	1	4	2	0	2	7	13	50.0	1928–29	1929–30	
Reymersholms IK	1	0	1	0	1	1	0	0	2	1	1	0	6	2	50.0	1941–42	1941–42	
Råå IF	2	2	0	0	2	1	1	0	4	3	1	0	10	1	75.0	1950–51	1951–52	
Sandvikens AIK	1	1	0	0	1	1	0	0	2	2	0	0	3	1	100.0	1954–55	1954–55	
Sandvikens IF	16	8	2	6	17	7	2	8	33	15	4	14	61	50	45.5	1932–33	1961	
Stattena IF	5	3	2	0	5	2	1	2	10	5	3	2	31	12	50.0	1925–26	1934–35	
Syrianska FC	3	3	0	0	3	2	1	0	6	5	1	0	11	3	83.3	2011	2013	
Trelleborgs FF^{†}	17	6	5	6	17	7	5	5	34	13	10	11	48	37	38.2	1985	2011	
Umeå FC	2	2	0	0	2	1	0	1	4	3	0	1	4	2	75.0	1996	2000	
Varbergs BoIS	1	0	1	0	1	1	0	0	2	1	1	0	7	5	50.0	1927–28	1927–28	
Varbergs GIF	5	3	2	0	5	1	2	2	10	4	4	2	18	10	40.0	1923–24	1927–28	
Västerås SK	5	5	0	0	5	4	0	1	10	9	0	1	36	11	90.0	1955–56	2000	
Västra Frölunda IF	9	5	3	1	9	4	2	3	18	9	5	4	28	19	50.0	1987	1999	
Åtvidabergs FF	21	19	2	0	21	8	7	6	42	27	9	6	78	36	64.3	1951–52	2015	
Ängelholms FF	3	2	1	0	3	1	2	0	6	3	3	0	15	6	50.0	1926–27	1935–36	^{[L]}
Örebro SK^{†}	49	25	19	5	49	20	17	12	98	45	36	17	165	100	45.9	1946–47	2017	
Örgryte IS	45	26	11	9	45	21	13	12	92	47	24	21	172	111	51.1	1922–23	2009	
Östers IF	35	17	8	10	35	9	13	13	70	26	21	23	92	88	37.1	1968	2013	
Östersunds FK^{†}	2	1	0	1	2	1	1	0	4	2	1	1	8	7	50.0	2016	2017	

a Results in Allsvenskan, Superettan and Mästerskapsserien sourced to Lindahl, Allsvenskan genom tiderna and Superettan genom tiderna located at www.bolletinen.se. This list excludes games played in the 1933–34 Allsvenskan when Malmö FF were disqualified after 13 matches. To access and verify the information enter "Malmö FF" in the search bar to the right on the page and press enter or "visa" (show).
b Results in Division 2 and Svenska Serien sourced to Smitt, 2009.

== Footnotes ==
A. The title of "Swedish Champions" has been awarded to the winner of four different competitions over the years. Between 1896 and 1925 the title was awarded to the winner of Svenska Mästerskapet, a stand-alone cup tournament. No club were given the title between 1926 and 1930 even though the first-tier league Allsvenskan was played. In 1931 the title was reinstated and awarded to the winner of Allsvenskan. Between 1982 and 1990 a play-off in cup format was held at the end of the league season to decide the champions. After the play-off format in 1991 and 1992 the title was decided by the winner of Mästerskapsserien, an additional league after the end of Allsvenskan. Since the 1993 season the title has once again been awarded to the winner of Allsvenskan.
B. Record against Café Opera/Djursholm included
C. Record against Krokslätts FF included
D. Record against Falkenbergs GIK included
E. Record against Malmö BI included
F. Record against Husqvarna IF included
G. Record against IFK Kristianstad included
H. Record against Lessebo GIF included
I. Record against Panos Ljungskile SK included
J. Record against Ludvika FfI included
K. Record against BK Drott included
L. Record against Ängelholms IF included
