= List of Malmö FF records and statistics =

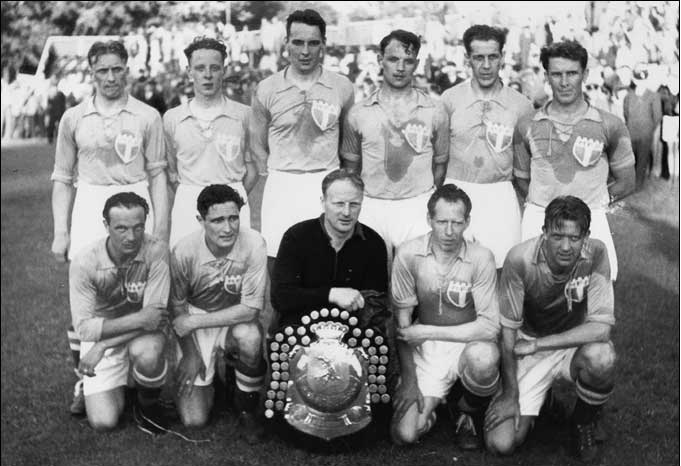
The Malmö FF team of 1948–1949 who started the run of 49 consecutive league matches without defeat, a record still standing in Allsvenskan as of 2018.

Malmö Fotbollförening, also known simply as Malmö FF, is a Swedish professional association football club based in Malmö. The club is affiliated with Skånes Fotbollförbund (the Scanian Football Association), and plays its home games at Stadion. Formed on 24 February 1910, Malmö FF is the most successful club in Sweden in terms of trophies won. The club have won the most Swedish championship titles of any club with twenty, a record twenty-three league titles, and a record fourteen national cup titles. (Note: The title of "Swedish Champions" has been awarded to the winner of four different competitions over the years. Between 1896 and 1925 the title was awarded to the winner of Svenska Mästerskapet, a stand-alone cup tournament. No club were given the title between 1926 and 1930 even though the first-tier league Allsvenskan was played. In 1931 the title was reinstated and awarded to the winner of Allsvenskan. Between 1982 and 1990 a play-off in cup format was held at the end of the league season to decide the champions. After the play-off format in 1991 and 1992 the title was decided by the winner of Mästerskapsserien, an additional league after the end of Allsvenskan. Since the 1993 season the title has once again been awarded to the winner of Allsvenskan.) The team competes in Allsvenskan as of the 2018 season, the club's 18th consecutive season in the top flight, and their 83rd overall. The main rivals of the club are Helsingborgs IF, IFK Göteborg and, historically, IFK Malmö.

This list encompasses the major honours won by Malmö FF and records set by the club, their managers and their players. The player records section includes details of the club's leading goalscorers and those who have made most appearances in first-team competitions. It also records notable achievements by Malmö FF players on the international stage. The club's attendance records, at Stadion, their home since 2009, Malmö Stadion, their home between 1958 and 2008, and Malmö IP, their home between 1910 and 1958, are also included in the list.

The club currently holds the record for the most Swedish championships with 20, the most Allsvenskan titles with 23 and Svenska Cupen triumphs with 14. The club's record appearance maker is Krister Kristensson, who made 348 league appearances between 1963 and 1978, and the club's record goalscorer is Hans Håkansson, who scored 163 goals in 192 league games between 1927 and 1938.

All statistics accurate as of match played 6 November 2016.

== Honors ==
Malmö FF's first trophy was the Division 2 Sydsvenska Serien, which they won in the 1920–21 season. Their first national senior honour came first in 1944, when they won the 1943–44 Allsvenskan title. The club also won Svenska Cupen for the first time the same year. In terms of the number of trophies won, the 1970s was Malmö FF's most successful decade, during which time they won five league titles and four cup titles.

The club currently holds the record for most Swedish championships with 22, most Allsvenskan titles with 25, most Svenska Cupen titles with 15, and the record for the most Svenska Cupen final appearances with eighteen. They also became the first and, as of 2017, the only Swedish club to reach the final of the European Cup (present day UEFA Champions League) in 1979. Malmö FF is also the only Nordic club to have been represented at the Intercontinental Cup (succeeded by FIFA Club World Cup) in which they competed for the 1979 title. Their most recent major trophy came in October 2016, when they won their most recent Allsvenskan title.

=== Domestic ===
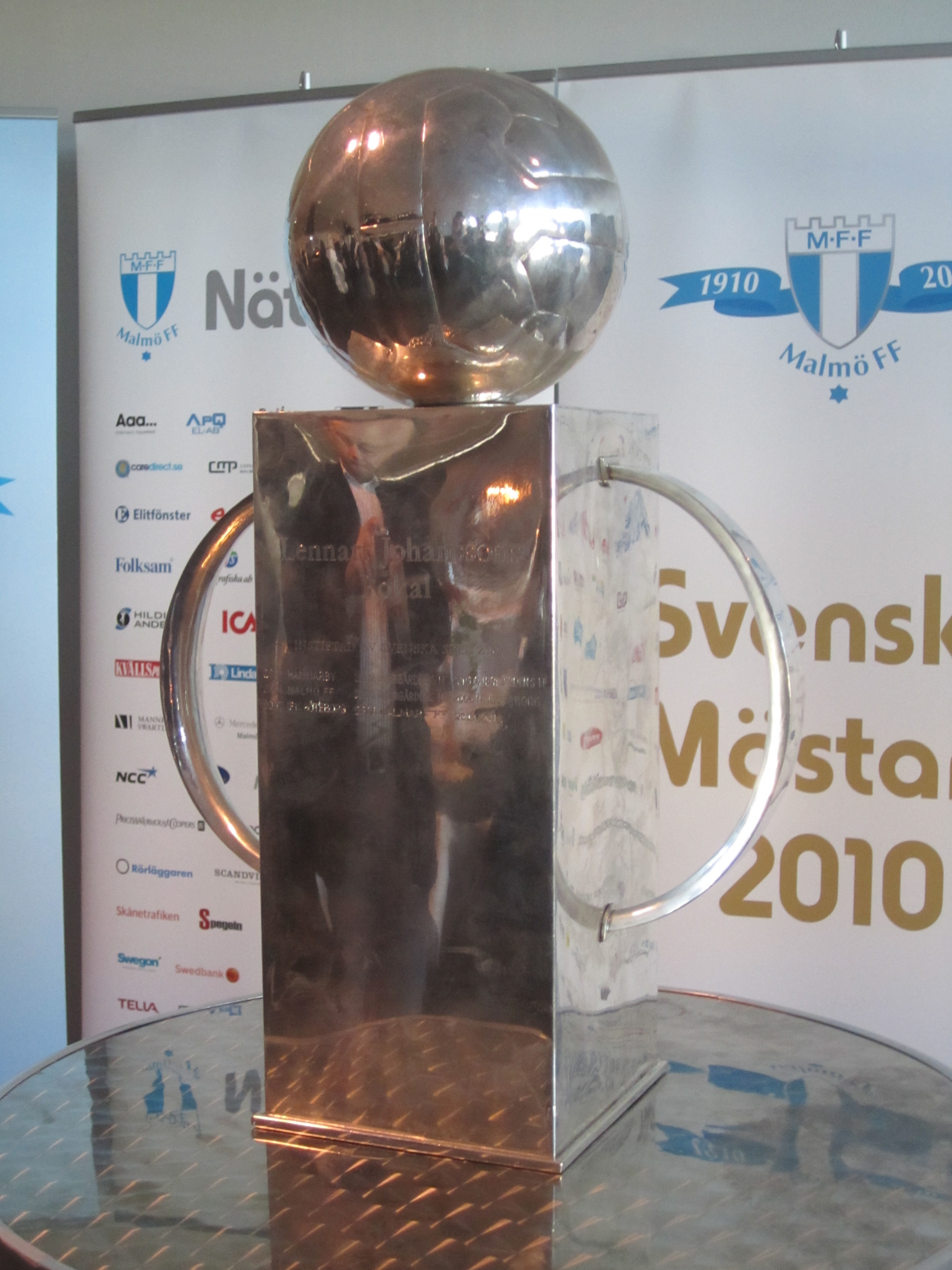
Lennart Johanssons Pokal, the current trophy awarded to the Swedish football champions, here seen in 2010 in Malmö FF's ownership after winning Allsvenskan the same year.

- Swedish Champions
  - Winners (22): 1943–44, 1948–49, 1949–50, 1950–51, 1952–53, 1965, 1967, 1970, 1971, 1974, 1975, 1977, 1986, 1988, 2004, 2010, 2013, 2014, 2016, 2017, 2020, 2021

==== League ====
- Allsvenskan (Tier 1)
  - Winners (25): 1943–44, 1948–49, 1949–50, 1950–51, 1952–53, 1965, 1967, 1970, 1971, 1974, 1975, 1977, 1985, 1986, 1987, 1988, 1989, 2004, 2010, 2013, 2014, 2016, 2017, 2020, 2021
  - Runners-up (14): 1945–46, 1947–48, 1951–52, 1955–56, 1956–57, 1964, 1968, 1969, 1976, 1978, 1980, 1983, 1996, 2002
- Division 2 Sydsvenska Serien (Tier 2)
  - Winners (1): 1920–21
  - Runners-up (1): 1923–24
- Division 2 Södra (Tier 2)
  - Winners (3): 1930–31, 1934–35, 1935–36
  - Runners-up (1): 1929–30
- Superettan (Tier 2)
  - Runners-up (1): 2000

==== Cups ====
- Svenska Cupen
  - Winners (15): 1944, 1946, 1947, 1951, 1953, 1967, 1972–73, 1973–74, 1974–75, 1977–78, 1979–80, 1983–84, 1985–86, 1988–89, 2021–22
  - Runners-up (6): 1945, 1970–71, 1995–96, 2015–16, 2017–18, 2019–20
- Allsvenskan play-offs
  - Winners (2): 1986, 1988
  - Runners-up (2): 1987, 1989
- Svenska Supercupen Last season was in 2015
  - Winners (2): 2013, 2014
  - Runners-up (1): 2011
- Distriktsmästerskap: Skåne (Regional championship of Scania) Last season was in 1966
  - Winners (22): 1927, 1938, 1939, 1942, 1943, 1944, 1945, 1946, 1947, 1948, 1951, 1953, 1954, 1955, 1956, 1958, 1959, 1960, 1963, 1964, 1965, 1966
  - Runners up (4): 1916, 1922, 1937, 1952

==== Doubles ====
- Allsvenskan and Svenska Cupen
  - Winners (8): 1943–44, 1950–51, 1952–53, 1967, 1974, 1975, 1986, 1989

=== European ===
- European Cup
  - Runners-up (1): 1978–79

=== Worldwide ===
- Intercontinental Cup Last season was in 2004
  - Runners-up (1): 1979

=== Awards ===
- Svenska Dagbladet Gold Medal
  - Winners (1) 1979

== Players ==
=== Appearances ===
- Youngest first-team player: Alexander Nilsson – 15 years, 343 days (against IF Elfsborg, Allsvenskan, 17 September 2008)
- Youngest goalscorer: Lars Granström – 17 years, 159 days (against Djurgårdens IF, Allsvenskan, 15 May 1960)

==== Most league appearances ====
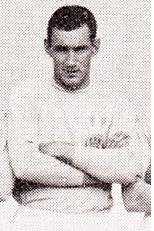
Krister Kristensson made over 300 league appearances for Malmö FF, more than any other player.

The following is a list of the ten Malmö FF players with the most league appearances. (Note: For up to date statistics and referencing for current Malmö FF players on this list, see the statistics section at svenskfotboll.se: click on the relevant player's name there to verify that the statistics displayed on this list are correct. For players who are no longer part of the squad, but who played in Malmö FF after 2010, see www.soccerway.com, and enter the player's name into the search field in the upper-right-hand corner and press enter to verify the player's statistics.)

Name	Nationality	Malmö FF career	League appearances	League goals	Total appearances	Total goals
Krister Kristensson	Sweden	1963–1978	348	7	626	16
Erik Nilsson	Sweden	1934–1953	326	1	600	4
Roy Andersson	Sweden	1968–1983	317	21	624	49
Bo Larsson	Sweden	1962–1966; 1969–1979	302	119	546	289
Roland Andersson	Sweden	1968–1974; 1977–1983	299	6	564	13
Jan Möller	Sweden	1972–1980; 1984–1988	298	1	591	1
Jonnie Fedel	Sweden	1984–2001	293	0	588	1
Daniel Andersson	Sweden	1995–1998; 2004–2013	292	30	460	39
Torbjörn Persson	Sweden	1980–1995	281	10	574	39
Prawitz Öberg	Sweden	1952–1965	278	34	515	103

=== Goalscorers ===
- Most goals scored in a season, Lower league: 30 – Hans Håkansson, 1935–36
- Most goals scored in a season, Allsvenskan: 28 – Bo Larsson, 1965

==== Overall scorers ====
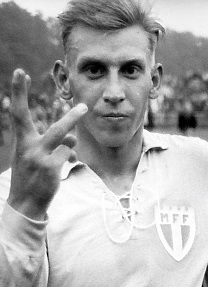
Bo Larsson is Malmö FF's all-time leading goalscorer in Allsvenskan.

The following is a list of the ten Malmö FF players who have scored the most league goals.

Name	Nationality	Malmö FF career	League appearances	League goals	Total appearances	Total goals
Hans Håkansson	Sweden	1927–1938	192	163	350	341
Bo Larsson	Sweden	1962–1966; 1969–1979	302	119	546	289
Egon Jönsson	Sweden	1943–1955	200	99	405	269
Börje Tapper	Sweden	1939–1951	191	91	371	298
Thomas Sjöberg	Sweden	1974–1976; 1977–1978; 1979–1982	180	80	334	157
Ivar Roslund	Sweden	1925–1937	169	71	311	179
Ingvar Rydell	Sweden	1948–1953	106	68	210	162
Stellan Nilsson	Sweden	1940–1950	179	68	336	166
Gustaf Nilsson	Sweden	1940–1950	132	65	265	205
Ingvar Svahn	Sweden	1957–1968; 1970	228	62	414	161

=== Award winners ===
==== Guldbollen ====
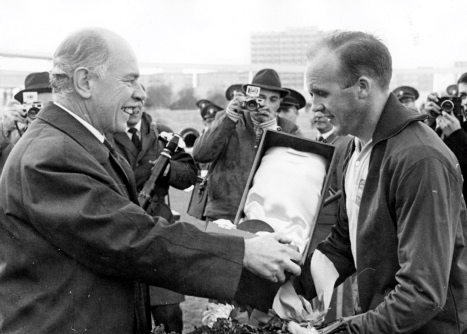
Prawitz Öberg being rewarded Guldbollen in 1962 by Gunnar Lange, chairman of the Swedish Football Association.

The following is a list of the Malmö FF players who have won Guldbollen while at the club. The award is given by the Swedish newspaper Aftonbladet and the Swedish Football Association to the best male Swedish footballer each year.

Player	Years
Erik Nilsson	1950
Prawitz Öberg	1962
Bo Larsson	1965
Bo Larsson	1973
Ingvar Svahn	1967
Roy Andersson	1977
Jan Möller	1979
Jonas Thern	1989

==== Allsvenskan top scorer ====
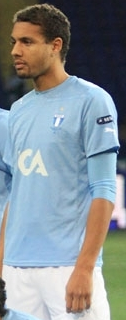
Mathias Ranégie is the latest Malmö FF player to become the Allsvenskan top scorer.

The following is a list of the Malmö FF players who have become the Allsvenskan top scorer while at the club.

Player	Year	Goals
Ove Andersson (Note: Andersson shared his title with Erik Persson of AIK and Yngve Lindgren of Örgryte IS.)	1938–39	16
Ingvar Rydell	1949–50	22
Bo Larsson (Note: Larsson shared his 1963 title with Lars Heinermann of Degerfors IF.)	1963	17
Bo Larsson	1965	28
Dag Szepanski	1967	22
Bo Larsson	1970	16
Lars Larsson	1987	19
Martin Dahlin	1988	17
Peter Ijeh	2002	24
Niklas Skoog	2003	22
Mathias Ranégie (Note: Ranégie transferred to Malmö FF halfway through the 2011 season. He scored 18 goals for BK Häcken and 3 goals for Malmö FF, adding up to a total of 21 goals.)	2011	21

=== Allsvenskan records held by players of the club ===
As of the end of the 2017 season.

Type of record	Record specifics	Player	Notes
Most consecutive championships	5 championships	Leif Engqvist; Torbjörn Persson	1985 – 1989 seasons
Most Allsvenskan medals	14 medals	Jan Möller	Two medals won while playing for Trelleborgs FF
Shortest time between a players debut and championship won	2 months and 18 days	Magnus Andersson	Debut on 8 August 1975 and champion on 26 October 1975
Most goals scored in a game	7 goals	Arne Hjertsson	On 3 June 1943 in Malmö FF – Halmstads BK, shared with Gunnar Nordahl
Most consecutive matches without defeat from debut	48 matches	Karl-Erik Palmér	6 May 1949 – 1 June 1951
Most consecutive matches without defeat	49 matches	Sven Hjertsson; Egon Jönsson	6 May 1949 – 1 June 1951
Goalkeeper with most consecutive matches without defeat	40 matches	Helge Bengtsson	6 May 1949 – 6 November 1950
Goalkeeper with least conceded goals in a single season	11 goals	Jan Möller; Jonnie Fedel	Möller for the 1986 season and Fedel for the 1989 season

== Managers ==
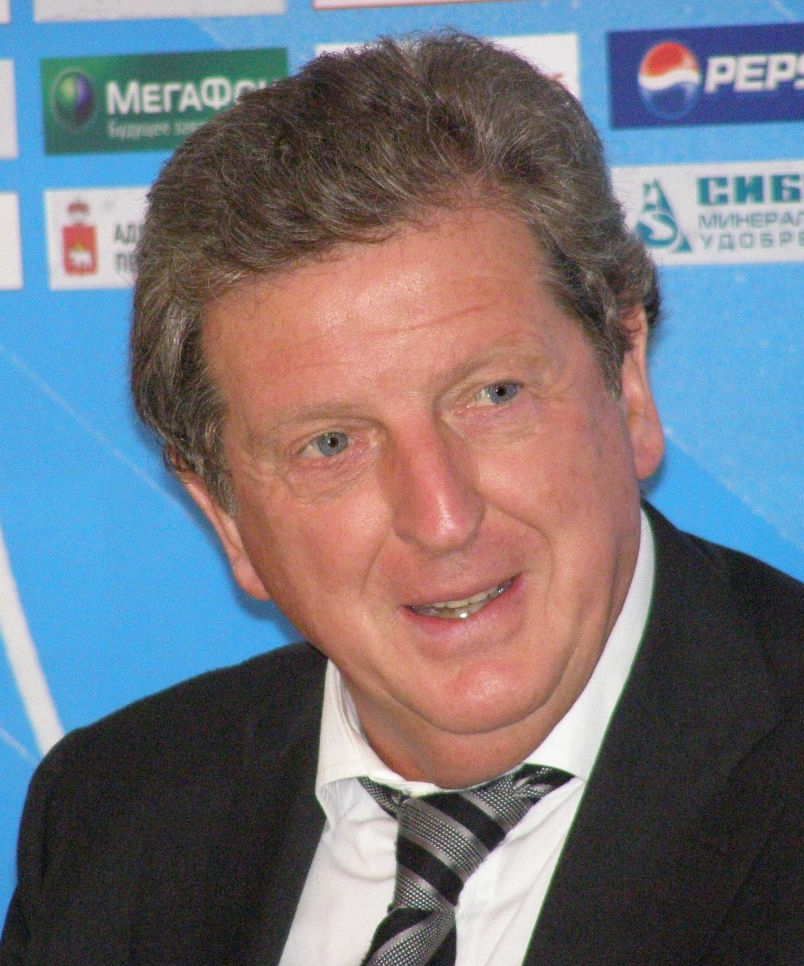
Roy Hodgson won five consecutive Allsvenskan titles and two Svenska Cupen titles during his five years at the club. He is pictured in 2010 as manager of Fulham.

- Longest serving manager: Bob Houghton (managed the club for 304 games over two spells; 226 games from 13 April 1974 to 25 June 1980 and 78 games from 8 April 1990 to 19 July 1992).
- First foreign manager: Václav Simon (Czechoslovak – managed the club for 22 games from 9 August 1936 to 13 June 1937).

=== Allsvenskan records held by managers of the club ===
As of the end of the 2017 season.

Type of record	Record specifics	Manager	Notes
Youngest manager	26 years, 165 days	Bob Houghton	Against Hammarby IF, 13 April 1974
Youngest manager to win a championship	26 years, 362 days	Bob Houghton	Against Djurgårdens IF, 27 October 1974
Oldest manager to win a championship	61 years, 39 days	Åge Hareide	Against Åtvidabergs FF, 1 November 2014
Manager with most championships	7 championships	Roy Hodgson	Two titles won while managing Halmstads BK

== Club records ==
Malmö FF's progress through the Swedish football league system. The different shades of grey represent league divisions.

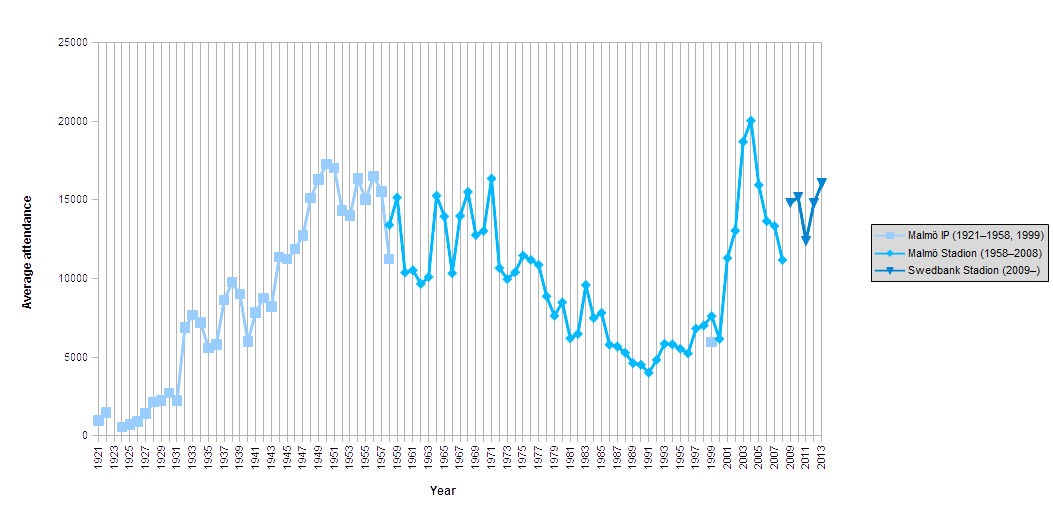
Malmö FF's average league attendances over the period from 1921 to 2013

=== Matches ===
- First competitive match: Malmö FF 4–2 IFK Malmö, Distriktsmästerskap, Quarter-finals, 27 June 1911
- First league match: Malmö FF 3–0 IS Halmia, Division 2 Sydsvenska Serien, 2 May 1920
- First Allsvenskan match: Malmö FF 0–1 IFK Göteborg, 2 August 1931
- First Svenska Cupen match: Malmö FF 11–0 Vivstavarvs IK, Round 1, 13 July 1941
- First European match: Lokomotiv Sofia 8–3 Malmö FF, European Cup Preliminary Round, first leg, 10 September 1964
- First competitive match at Malmö IP: Malmö FF 4–2 IFK Malmö, Distriktsmästerskap, Quarter-finals, 27 June 1911
- First competitive match at Malmö Stadion: Malmö FF 4–4 IFK Malmö, Allsvenskan, 8 August 1958
- First competitive match at Stadion: Malmö FF 3–0 Örgryte IS, Allsvenskan, 13 April 2009

==== Record wins ====
- Record overall win: 12–0
  - Malmö FF – Halmstad BK, Allsvenskan, 3 June 1943
  - Malmö FF – Jönköpings Södra IF, Allsvenskan, 26 May 1949
- Record league win: 12–0
  - Malmö FF – Halmstad BK, Allsvenskan, 3 June 1943
  - Malmö FF – Jönköpings Södra IF, Allsvenskan, 26 May 1949
- Record Svenska Cupen win: 11–0
  - Malmö FF – Vivstavarvs IK, Round 1, 13 July 1941
  - Stenungsunds IF – Malmö FF, Round 2, 1 May 2007
- Record European win: Malmö FF 11–0 Pezoporikos Larnaca, European Cup Winners' Cup, First round, second leg, 22 September 1973
- Record home win: 12–0
  - Malmö FF – Halmstad BK, Allsvenskan, 3 June 1943
  - Malmö FF – Jönköpings Södra IF, Allsvenskan, 26 May 1949
- Record away win: Stenungsunds IF 0–11 Malmö FF, Svenska Cupen, Round 2, 1 May 2007

==== Record defeats ====
- Record overall defeat: Kalmar FF 9–0 Malmö FF, Division 2, 19 August 1928
- Record league defeat: Kalmar FF 9–0 Malmö FF, Division 2, 19 August 1928
- Record Allsvenskan defeat: 1–7
  - IF Elfsborg – Malmö FF, Allsvenskan, 16 October 1932
  - AIK – Malmö FF, Allsvenskan, 31 August 1960
- Record Svenska Cupen defeat: 0–4
  - IFK Norrköping – Malmö FF, Round 5, 17 August 1969
  - Mjällby AIF – Malmö FF, Round 2, 25 August 1999
  - Djurgårdens IF – Malmö FF, Semi-finals, 26 September 2002
  - Malmö FF – Djurgårdens IF, Round 4, 26 June 2003
- Record European defeat: Real Madrid 8–0 Malmö FF, UEFA Champions League Group stage, 8 December 2015
- Record home defeat: Malmö FF 0–6 IFK Göteborg, Allsvenskan, 14 May 2001
- Record away defeat: Kalmar FF 9–0 Malmö FF, Division 2, 19 August 1928

==== Streaks ====
- Longest unbeaten run (League): 49 matches, 6 May 1949 to 1 June 1951
- Longest winning streak (League): 23 matches, 15 May 1949 to 7 May 1950
- Longest losing streak (League): 5 matches
  - 1 November 1931 to 1 May 1932
  - 12 August 1953 to 13 September 1953
  - 14 May 1961 to 11 June 1961
  - 25 August 1966 to 22 September 1966
- Longest drawing streak (League): 4 matches
  - 5 May 1966 to 26 May 1966
  - 6 September 1978 to 20 September 1978
  - 3 June 1984 to 26 June 1984
  - 31 March 2008 to 13 April 2008
- Longest streak without a win (League): 11 matches, 4 June 1939 to 29 October 1939
- Longest scoring run (League): 27 matches, 6 May 1949 to 22 October 1950
- Longest non-scoring run (League): 4 matches
  - 30 August 1953 to 20 September 1953
  - 13 June 1979 to 25 June 1979
- Longest streak without conceding a goal (League): 7 matches, 23 April 1978 to 12 July 1978

==== Wins/draws/losses in a season ====
- Most wins in a league season: 21 in 30 matches, Allsvenskan, 2010 and 2016
- Most draws in a league season: 12 in 26 matches, Allsvenskan, 1995
- Most defeats in a league season: 15 in 26 matches, Allsvenskan, 1999
- Fewest wins in a league season: 1 in 10 matches, Svenska Serien, 1922–23
- Fewest draws in a league season: 1 in 10 matches, Division 2, 1920–21
- Fewest defeats in a league season: 0
  - In 18 matches, Division 2, 1934–35
  - In 22 matches, Allsvenskan, 1949–50

=== Goals ===
- Most League goals scored in a season: 82 in 22 matches, Allsvenskan, 1949–50
- Fewest League goals scored in a season: 6 in 10 matches, Svenska Serien, 1922–23
- Most League goals conceded in a season: 68 in 22 matches, Allsvenskan, 1931–32
- Fewest League goals conceded in a season: 2 in 18 matches, Division 2, 1930–31

=== Points ===
- Most points in a season:

Two points for a win: 43 in 26 matches, Allsvenskan, 1974
Three points for a win: 67 in 30 matches, Allsvenskan, 2010

- Fewest points in a season:

Two points for a win: 4 in 10 matches, Svenska Serien, 1922–23
Three points for a win: 25 in 26 matches, Allsvenskan, 1999

=== Attendances ===
- Highest attendance at Malmö Stadion: 29,328, Malmö FF 1–2 Helsingborgs IF, Allsvenskan, 24 September 1967.
- Highest attendance at Stadion: 24,148, Malmö FF 2–0 Mjällby AIF, Allsvenskan, 7 November 2010.
- Highest attendance at Malmö IP: 22,436, Malmö FF 0–3 Helsingborgs IF, Allsvenskan, 1 June 1956.
- Highest attendance average at Malmö Stadion: 20,061, 2004 season.
- Highest attendance average at Stadion: 17,841, 2016 season.
- Highest attendance average at Malmö IP: 17,290, 1949–50 season.

=== Allsvenskan records held by the club ===
As of the end of the 2016 season.

Type of record	Record specifics	Notes
Most championships won	22 championships	
Most consecutive championships won	5 championships	1985–1989
Most consecutive matches won	23 matches	15 May 1949 – 7 May 1950
Most consecutive home fixtures won	28 matches	26 May 1949 – 23 September 1951
Most consecutive away fixtures won	12 matches	15 May 1949 – 30 April 1950
Most consecutive matches without defeat in a single season	22 matches	1949–50 season
Most consecutive matches without defeat	49 matches	6 May 1949 – 1 June 1951
Most consecutive home fixtures without defeat	40 matches	7 November 1949 – 8 June 1952
Most consecutive away fixtures without defeat	24 matches	15 May 1949 – 20 May 1951
Most goalless matches at home in a single season	5 matches	1939–40 and 1990 seasons
Most away fixtures without conceding a goal in a single season	6 matches	1990 and 2014 seasons
Least conceded goals in a single season	11 goals	1986 and 1989 seasons
Highest goal difference in a single season	61	1949–50 season
Highest point marginal to runners-up	15 points	1949–50 season
Most points in a single season (3 points for a win)	67 points	2010 season
Most consecutive seasons	63 seasons	1936–37 – 1999 season

== Competitive record ==
Statistics correct as of the end of the 2016 season

=== Key ===
- S = Seasons
- Pld = Played
- W = Games won
- D = Games drawn
- L = Games lost
- GF = Goals for
- GA = Goals against
- GD = Goal difference

=== Domestic record ===
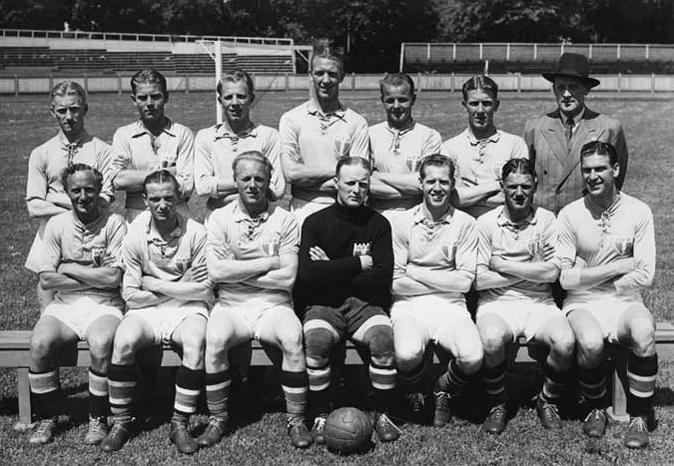
The Malmö FF team of 1943–44, when the club won Allsvenskan for the first time

The following is a list of the all-time statistics from Malmö FF's games in domestic football, as well as the overall total. The statistics does not include the post league competitions held in the 1980s and 1990s, Allsvenskan play-offs and Mästerskapsserien.

Tournament	S	Pld	W	D	L	GF	GA	GD
Allsvenskan / Svenska Serien (tier 1)	82	1959	967	494	498	3498	2333	+1165
Division 2 / Superettan (tier 2)	12	208	115	43	50	516	214	+302
Svenska Cupen	60	213	161	14	38	591	213	+378
Svenska Supercupen	3	3	1	1	1	6	6	0
Total	157	2383	1244	552	587	4611	2766	+1845

=== European record ===
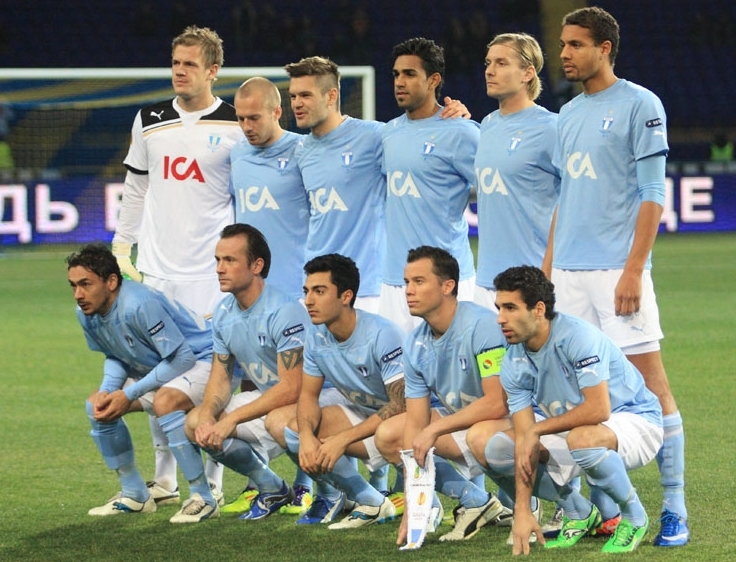
The Malmö FF team lines up before a 2011–12 UEFA Europa League group stage match against FC Metalist Kharkiv

The following is a list of the all-time statistics from Malmö FF's games in the four UEFA tournaments it has participated in, as well as the overall total. The statistics include qualification matches.

Tournament	S	Pld	W	D	L	GF	GA	GD
European Champion Clubs' Cup / UEFA Champions League	19	92	33	22	37	100	142	−42
UEFA Cup / UEFA Europa League	14	50	19	8	23	68	65	+3
Cup Winners' Cup	5	22	9	7	6	35	18	+17
Inter-Cities Fairs Cup	4	8	0	1	7	4	23	−19
UEFA Intertoto Cup	1	2	0	0	2	1	4	−3
Intercontinental Cup / FIFA Club World Cup	1	2	0	0	2	1	3	−2
Total	41	155	52	32	71	184	229	−45
