= Corinthian Bowl =

Swedish football cup tournament

- Status: inactive
- Genre: sporting event
- Date: summertime season
- Frequency: annual
- Country: Sweden
- Inaugurated: 1906
- Most recent: 1913

Corinthian Bowl was a Swedish football cup tournament played between 1906 and 1913 commemorating the English club Corinthian and their visit to Sweden in 1904.

== Previous winners ==
Season	Winners	Runners-up
1906	Örgryte IS (1)	IFK Stockholm
1907	Örgryte IS (2)	IFK Stockholm
1908	Örgryte IS (3)	Djurgårdens IF
1909	Örgryte IS (4)	IFK Uppsala
1910	Djurgårdens IF (1)	Örgryte IS
1911	Örgryte IS (5)	Djurgårdens IF
1912	Örgryte IS (6)	AIK
1913	Örgryte IS (7)	AIK

== Cup champions ==
Titles	Club
7	Örgryte IS
1	Djurgårdens IF
