= Wicanderska Välgörenhetsskölden =

Football tournament in Sweden

Wicanderska välgörenhetsskölden
- Status: inactive
- Genre: sporting event
- Date: summertime season
- Frequency: annual
- Country: Sweden
- Inaugurated: 1905
- Most recent: 1916

Wicanderska Välgörenhetsskölden ("The Wicander Charity Shield") was a Swedish football cup tournament played between 1905 and 1916, a match was also planned to be played in 1920, but was not. The idea for the tournament came from the English Charity Shield trophy, and in the same way as the English match, profits from the matches in the Swedish tournament were given to various charities.

== Previous winners ==
Season	Winners	Runners-up
1905	IFK Stockholm (1)	AIK
1906	IFK Stockholm (2)	AIK
1907	Djurgårdens IF (1)	Mariebergs IK
1908	AIK (1)	Djurgårdens IF
1909	AIK (2)	Mariebergs IK
1910	Djurgårdens IF (2)	Eriksdals IF
1911	IFK Stockholm (3)	Westermalms IF
1912	IFK Stockholm (4)	Mariebergs IK
1913	Djurgårdens IF (3)	Westermalms IF
1914	AIK (3)	Djurgårdens IF
1915	Djurgårdens IF (4)	AIK
1916	AIK (4)	Djurgårdens IF
1920	Not played	

== Cup champions ==
Titles	Club
4	AIK
4	Djurgårdens IF
4	IFK Stockholm

== Sources ==
- DIFarkivet.se: Wicanderska Välgörenhetsskölden (in Swedish)
