= 1901 in Swedish football =

The 1901 season in Swedish football, starting January 1901 and ending December 1901:

== Honours ==
=== Official titles ===
Title	Team	Reason
Swedish Champions 1901	AIK	Winners of Svenska Mästerskapet

=== Competitions ===
Level	Competition	Team
Championship Cup	Svenska Mästerskapet 1901	AIK
Cup competition	Kamratmästerskapen 1901	IFK Eskilstuna
Cup competition	Rosenska Pokalen 1901	No winner

== Promotions, relegations and qualifications ==
=== Promotions ===
Promoted from	Promoted to	Team	Reason
Unknown	Svenska Bollspelsförbundets serie 1902	AIK	Unknown
Unknown	Svenska Bollspelsförbundets serie 1902	AIK 2	Unknown
Unknown	Svenska Bollspelsförbundets serie 1902	Djurgårdens IF	Unknown
Unknown	Svenska Bollspelsförbundets serie 1902	Norrmalms IK	Unknown
Unknown	Svenska Bollspelsförbundets serie 1902	IF Sleipner	Unknown
Unknown	Svenska Bollspelsförbundets serie 1902	IF Swithiod	Unknown
Unknown	Svenska Bollspelsförbundets serie 1902	Östermalms SK	Unknown
Unknown	Svenska Bollspelsförbundets andra serie 1902	AIK 3	Unknown
Unknown	Svenska Bollspelsförbundets andra serie 1902	Djurgårdens IF 2	Unknown
Unknown	Svenska Bollspelsförbundets andra serie 1902	Norrmalms SK	Unknown
Unknown	Svenska Bollspelsförbundets andra serie 1902	IFK Stockholm	Unknown
Unknown	Svenska Bollspelsförbundets andra serie 1902	IK Svea	Unknown
Unknown	Svenska Bollspelsförbundets andra serie 1902	IF Swithiod 2	Unknown
Unknown	Svenska Bollspelsförbundets andra serie 1902	Östermalms IF	Unknown

== Domestic results ==
=== Svenska Mästerskapet 1901 ===
Final

8 September 1901

AIK	w.o.	Örgryte IS 2

Idrottsplatsen, Gothenburg

=== Kamratmästerskapen 1901 ===
Final

22 September 1901

IFK Eskilstuna	0–0 1–0 (aet)	IFK Köping

Johannisdal, Köping

=== Rosenska Pokalen 1901 ===
Final

1 September 1901

Gefle IF	1–1	AIK

Idrottsparken, Stockholm
