= 1904 in Swedish football =

The 1904 season in Swedish football, starting January 1904 and ending December 1904:

== Honours ==
=== Official titles ===
Title	Team	Reason
Swedish Champions 1904	Örgryte IS	Winners of Svenska Mästerskapet

=== Competitions ===
Level	Competition	Team
Regional league	Sv. Bollspelsförbundets tävlingsserie kl. 1 1904	IFK Uppsala
Regional league	Sv. Bollspelsförbundets tävlingsserie kl. 2 1904	Westermalms IF
Regional league	Seniorserien 1904	Örgryte IS
Championship Cup	Svenska Mästerskapet 1904	Örgryte IS
Cup competition	Kamratmästerskapen 1904	IFK Norrköping

== Promotions, relegations and qualifications ==
=== Promotions ===
Promoted from	Promoted to	Team	Reason
Unknown	Sv. Bollspelsförbundets tävlingsserie kl. 1 1905	Djurgårdens IF	Unknown
Unknown	Göteborgsserien klass I 1905	Bohus BK	Unknown
Unknown	Göteborgsserien klass I 1905	IFK Göteborg	Unknown
Unknown	Göteborgsserien klass I 1905	IK Vikingen	Unknown
Unknown	Göteborgsserien klass II 1905	Bohus BK 2	Unknown
Unknown	Göteborgsserien klass II 1905	IFK Göteborg 2	Unknown
Unknown	Göteborgsserien klass II 1905	IS Göterna	Unknown
Unknown	Göteborgsserien klass II 1905	IS Idrottens Vänner	Unknown
Unknown	Göteborgsserien klass II 1905	Jonsereds FK	Unknown
Unknown	Göteborgsserien klass II 1905	Krokslätts IK	Unknown

=== Relegations ===
Relegated from	Relegated to	Team	Reason
Sv. Bollspelsförbundets tävlingsserie kl. 1 1904	Sv. Bollspelsförbundets tävlingsserie kl. 2 1905	Mariebergs IK	Unknown
Sv. Bollspelsförbundets tävlingsserie kl. 1 1904	Sv. Bollspelsförbundets tävlingsserie kl. 2 1905	IF Swithiod	Unknown
Sv. Bollspelsförbundets tävlingsserie kl. 1 1904	Unknown	IFK Norrköping	Withdrew
Sv. Bollspelsförbundets tävlingsserie kl. 1 1904	Unknown	IF Sleipner	Unknown
Sv. Bollspelsförbundets tävlingsserie kl. 2 1904	Unknown	AIK 2	Unknown
Sv. Bollspelsförbundets tävlingsserie kl. 2 1904	Unknown	IK Göta	Unknown
Sv. Bollspelsförbundets tävlingsserie kl. 2 1904	Unknown	Idrottsklubben	Unknown
Sv. Bollspelsförbundets tävlingsserie kl. 2 1904	Unknown	Stockholms IK 2	Unknown
Sv. Bollspelsförbundets tävlingsserie kl. 2 1904	Unknown	IK Svea	Unknown
Seniorserien 1904	Göteborgsserien klass II 1905	Örgryte IS 2	Unknown

== Domestic results ==
=== Svenska Bollspelsförbundets tävlingsserie klass 1 1904 ===
	Team	Pld	W	D	L	GF		GA	GD	Pts
1	IFK Uppsala	6	6	0	0	27	–	3	+24	12
2	AIK	6	4	1	1	19	–	9	+10	9
3	Stockholms IK	6	4	0	2	8	–	13	-5	8
4	Östermalms IF	6	2	1	3	14	–	13	+1	5
5	IF Swithiod	6	2	1	3	14	–	16	-2	5
6	IF Sleipner	6	1	0	5	5	–	21	-16	2
7	Mariebergs IK	6	0	1	5	5	–	17	-12	1
–	IFK Stockholm	3	3	0	0	9	–	2	+7	6
–	IFK Norrköping	3	1	1	1	5	–	3	+2	3

=== Svenska Bollspelsförbundets tävlingsserie klass 2 1904 ===
	Team	Pld	W	D	L	GF		GA	GD	Pts
1	Westermalms IF	8	7	0	1	23	–	6	+17	14
2	Södermalms IK	8	6	1	1	21	–	3	+18	13
3	Norrmalms SK	8	5	1	2	17	–	3	+14	11
4	IF Drott	8	4	2	2	18	–	11	+7	10
5	IK Svea	8	3	0	5	15	–	19	-4	6
6	Idrottsklubben	8	2	1	5	6	–	19	-13	5
7	Stockholms IK 2	8	2	1	5	6	–	25	-19	5
8	AIK 2	8	1	2	5	8	–	17	-9	4
9	IK Göta	8	1	2	5	8	–	19	-11	4

=== Seniorserien 1904 ===
	Team	Pld	W	D	L	GF		GA	GD	Pts
1	Örgryte IS	12	8	2	2	47	–	17	+30	18
2	Örgryte IS 2	11	5	0	6	13	–	34	-21	10
3	GAIS	11	2	2	7	12	–	20	-8	6

=== Svenska Mästerskapet 1904 ===
Final

16 October 1904

Örgryte IS	2–1	Djurgårdens IF

Idrottsparken, Stockholm

=== Kamratmästerskapen 1904 ===
Final

16 October 1904

IFK Norrköping	4–1	IFK Köping

Sandplanen, Norrköping
