= Kamratmästerskapen =

Swedish football tournament

- Status: inactive
- Genre: sporting event
- Date: summertime season
- Frequency: annual
- Country: Sweden
- Inaugurated: 1901
- Most recent: 1945

Kamratmästerskapen (literally, "The Comrade Championships") was a Swedish football cup tournament played 1901–1924 and 1940–1945. The tournament was open only to teams of the Idrottsföreningen Kamraterna association, but was still an important tournament in the early years of Swedish football.

== Previous winners ==
| Season | Winners | Runners-up |
|---|---|---|
| 1901 | IFK Eskilstuna (1) | IFK Köping |
| 1902 | IFK Eskilstuna (2) | IFK Uppsala |
| 1903 | IFK Stockholm (1) | IFK Köping |
| 1904 | IFK Norrköping (1) | IFK Köping |
| 1905 | IFK Stockholm (2) | IFK Köping |
| 1906 | IFK Stockholm (3) | IFK Göteborg |
| 1907 | IFK Stockholm (4) | IFK Eskilstuna |
| 1908 | IFK Stockholm (5) | IFK Göteborg |
| 1909 | IFK Göteborg (1) | IFK Gävle |
| 1910 | IFK Göteborg (2) | IFK Norrköping |
| 1911 | IFK Norrköping (2) | IFK Stockholm |
| 1912 | IFK Göteborg (3) | IFK Stockholm |
| 1913 | IFK Göteborg (4) | IFK Stockholm |
| 1914 | IFK Göteborg (5) | IFK Stockholm |
| 1915 | IFK Göteborg (6) | IFK Gävle |
| 1916 | IFK Malmö (1) | IFK Eskilstuna |
| 1917 | IFK Eskilstuna (3) | IFK Malmö |
| 1918 | IFK Eskilstuna (4) | IFK Hässleholm |
| 1919 | IFK Hässleholm (1) | IFK Stockholm |
| 1920 | IFK Göteborg (7) | IFK Västerås |
| 1921 | IFK Göteborg (8) | IFK Eskilstuna |
| 1922 | IFK Göteborg (9) | IFK Stockholm |
| 1923 | No competition | |
| 1924 | IFK Göteborg (10) | IFK Örebro |
| 1925–39 | No competition | |
| 1940 | IFK Göteborg (11) | IFK Norrköping |
| 1941 | IFK Kristianstad (1) | IFK Västerås |
| 1942–44 | No competition | |
| 1945 | No winner | |

== Cup champions ==
| Titles | Club |
|---|---|
| 11 | IFK Göteborg |
| 5 | IFK Stockholm |
| 4 | IFK Eskilstuna |
| 2 | IFK Norrköping |
| 1 | IFK Hässleholm |
| 1 | IFK Kristianstad |
| 1 | IFK Malmö |
