= 1907 in Swedish football =

The 1907 season in Swedish football started January 1907 and ended December 1907.

== Honours ==
=== Official titles ===
Title	Team	Reason
Swedish Champions 1907	Örgryte IS	Winners of Svenska Mästerskapet

=== Competitions ===
Level	Competition	Team
Regional league	Stockholmsserien klass 1 1907	IFK Uppsala
Regional league	Stockholmsserien klass 2 1907	AIK
Regional league	Göteborgsserien klass I 1907	IFK Göteborg
Championship Cup	Svenska Mästerskapet 1907	Örgryte IS
Cup competition	Corinthian Bowl 1907	Örgryte IS
Cup competition	Kamratmästerskapen 1907	IFK Stockholm
Cup competition	Wicanderska Välgörenhetsskölden 1907	Djurgårdens IF

== Promotions, relegations and qualifications ==
=== Promotions ===
Promoted from	Promoted to	Team	Reason
Stockholmsserien klass 2 1907	Stockholmsserien klass 1 1908	AIK	Unknown
Unknown	Stockholmsserien klass 2 1908	IK Spurt	Unknown
Unknown	Stockholmsserien klass 2 1908	Stockholms IF	Unknown
Unknown	Stockholmsserien klass 2 1908	IK Union	Unknown
Unknown	Göteborgsserien klass I 1908–09	IS Göterna	Unknown
Unknown	Göteborgsserien klass I 1908–09	Örgryte IS	Unknown
Unknown	Göteborgsserien klass II 1908–09	Göteborgs FF	Unknown
Unknown	Göteborgsserien klass II 1908–09	Holmens IS	Unknown
Unknown	Göteborgsserien klass II 1908–09	Oscardals BK	Unknown
Unknown	Göteborgsserien klass II 1908–09	IK Wega	Unknown

=== Relegations ===
Relegated from	Relegated to	Team	Reason
Stockholmsserien klass 1 1907	Stockholmsserien klass 2 1908	Eriksdals IF	Unknown
Stockholmsserien klass 2 1907	Unknown	IF Vesta	Unknown
Göteborgsserien klass I 1907	Göteborgsserien klass II 1908–09	Krokslätts IK	Unknown
Göteborgsserien klass I 1907	Unknown	IFK Göteborg	Unknown
Göteborgsserien klass I 1907	Unknown	IFK Göteborg 2	Unknown
Göteborgsserien klass I 1907	Unknown	Jonsereds GIF	Unknown
Göteborgsserien klass I 1907	Unknown	Örgryte IS 2	Unknown

== Domestic results ==
=== Stockholmsserien klass 1 1907 ===
	Team	Pld	W	D	L	GF		GA	GD	Pts
1	IFK Uppsala	10	7	2	1	30	–	12	+18	16
2	IFK Stockholm	10	6	4	0	20	–	8	+12	16
3	Mariebergs IK	10	5	2	3	18	–	20	-2	12
4	Djurgårdens IF	10	3	2	5	11	–	13	-2	8
5	Östermalms IF	10	2	1	7	13	–	27	-14	5
6	Eriksdals IF	10	1	1	8	7	–	19	-12	3

=== Stockholmsserien klass 2 1907 ===
	Team	Pld	W	D	L	GF		GA	GD	Pts
1	AIK	10	7	1	2	24	–	7	+17	15
2	Westermalms IF	10	6	2	2	25	–	14	+11	14
3	Djurgårdens SK	10	6	1	3	18	–	11	+7	13
4	Södermalms IK	10	3	4	3	13	–	12	+1	10
5	IK Göta	10	1	2	7	6	–	22	-16	4
6	IF Vesta	10	1	2	7	2	–	22	-20	4

=== Göteborgsserien klass I 1907 ===
	Team	Pld	W	D	L	GF		GA	GD	Pts
1	IFK Göteborg	9	5	2	2	22	–	13	+9	12
2	Örgryte IS 2	9	5	1	3	20	–	15	+5	11
3	IK Vikingen	9	3	2	4	20	–	8	+12	8
4	Krokslätts IK	5	4	0	1	9	–	5	+4	8
5	Jonsereds GIF	9	3	1	5	11	–	17	-6	7
6	IFK Göteborg 2	9	2	0	7	13	–	28	-15	4

=== Svenska Mästerskapet 1907 ===
Final

6 October 1907

Örgryte IS	4–1	IFK Uppsala

Idrottsparken, Stockholm

=== Corinthian Bowl 1907 ===
Final

16 June 1907

Örgryte IS	10–1	IFK Stockholm

Balders Hage, Gothenburg

=== Kamratmästerskapen 1907 ===
Final

3 November 1907

IFK Stockholm	5–4	IFK Eskilstuna

Idrottsparken, Stockholm

=== Wicanderska Välgörenhetsskölden 1907 ===
Final

20 October 1907

Djurgårdens IF	2–1	Mariebergs IK

Idrottsparken, Stockholm
