= 1905 in Swedish football =

The 1905 season in Swedish football, starting January 1905 and ending December 1905:

== Honours ==
=== Official titles ===
Title	Team	Reason
Swedish Champions 1905	Örgryte IS	Winners of Svenska Mästerskapet

=== Competitions ===
Level	Competition	Team
Regional league	Sv. Bollspelsförbundets tävlingsserie kl. 1 1905	Djurgårdens IF
Regional league	Sv. Bollspelsförbundets tävlingsserie kl. 2 1905	Mariebergs IK
Regional league	Göteborgsserien klass I 1905	Örgryte IS
Regional league	Göteborgsserien klass II 1905	Örgryte IS 2
Championship Cup	Svenska Mästerskapet 1905	Örgryte IS
Cup competition	Kamratmästerskapen 1905	IFK Stockholm
Cup competition	Wicanderska Välgörenhetsskölden 1905	IFK Stockholm

== Promotions, relegations and qualifications ==
=== Promotions ===
Promoted from	Promoted to	Team	Reason
Sv. Bollspelsförbundets tävlingsserie kl. 2 1905	Sv. Bollspelsförbundets tävlingsserie kl. 1 1906	Mariebergs IK	Unknown
Sv. Bollspelsförbundets tävlingsserie kl. 2 1905	Sv. Bollspelsförbundets tävlingsserie kl. 1 1906	Westermalms IF	Unknown
Unknown	Sv. Bollspelsförbundets tävlingsserie kl. 2 1906	Eriksdals IF	Unknown
Unknown	Sv. Bollspelsförbundets tävlingsserie kl. 2 1906	Skeppsholmens IK	Unknown
Göteborgsserien klass II 1905	Göteborgsserien klass I 1906	Krokslätts IK	Unknown
Göteborgsserien klass II 1905	Göteborgsserien klass I 1906	Örgryte IS 2	Unknown
Unknown	Göteborgsserien klass I 1906	Göteborgs IF	Unknown
Unknown	Göteborgsserien klass II 1906	GAIS 2	Unknown
Unknown	Göteborgsserien klass II 1906	Göteborgs IF 2	Unknown
Unknown	Göteborgsserien klass II 1906	Holmens IS	Unknown
Unknown	Göteborgsserien klass II 1906	IK Spiran	Unknown
Unknown	Göteborgsserien klass II 1906	Örgryte IS 3	Unknown

=== Relegations ===
Relegated from	Relegated to	Team	Reason
Sv. Bollspelsförbundets tävlingsserie kl. 1 1905	Sv. Bollspelsförbundets tävlingsserie kl. 2 1906	Stockholms IK	Unknown
Sv. Bollspelsförbundets tävlingsserie kl. 1 1905	Sv. Bollspelsförbundets tävlingsserie kl. 2 1906	Östermalms IF	Unknown
Sv. Bollspelsförbundets tävlingsserie kl. 2 1905	Unknown	Norrmalms SK	Unknown
Sv. Bollspelsförbundets tävlingsserie kl. 2 1905	Unknown	IF Swithiod	Unknown
Göteborgsserien klass I 1905	Unknown	Bohus BK	Unknown
Göteborgsserien klass I 1905	Unknown	GAIS	Unknown
Göteborgsserien klass I 1905	Unknown	Örgryte IS	Unknown
Göteborgsserien klass II 1905	Unknown	Bohus BK 2	Unknown
Göteborgsserien klass II 1905	Unknown	IS Idrottens Vänner	Unknown

== Domestic results ==
=== Svenska Bollspelsförbundets tävlingsserie klass 1 1905 ===
	Team	Pld	W	D	L	GF		GA	GD	Pts
1	Djurgårdens IF	10	8	2	0	25	–	6	+19	18
2	IFK Uppsala	10	5	3	2	21	–	15	+6	13
3	AIK	10	4	2	4	15	–	14	+1	10
4	IFK Stockholm	10	3	3	4	16	–	17	-1	9
5	Stockholms IK	10	3	0	7	8	–	26	-18	6
6	Östermalms IF	10	2	0	8	11	–	18	-7	4

=== Svenska Bollspelsförbundets tävlingsserie klass 2 1905 ===
	Team	Pld	W	D	L	GF		GA	GD	Pts
1	Mariebergs IK	10	9	1	0	26	–	6	+20	19
2	Westermalms IF	10	7	1	2	21	–	15	+6	15
3	Södermalms IK	10	5	2	3	13	–	10	+3	12
4	BS Drott	10	3	2	5	6	–	17	-11	8
5	IF Swithiod	10	2	2	6	12	–	25	-13	6
6	Norrmalms SK	10	0	0	10	6	–	11	-5	0

=== Göteborgsserien klass I 1905 ===
	Team	Pld	W	D	L	GF		GA	GD	Pts
1	Örgryte IS	8	8	0	0	41	–	2	+39	16
2	IFK Göteborg	8	5	0	3	35	–	15	+20	10
3	Bohus BK	8	4	0	4	12	–	30	-18	8
4	GAIS	8	3	0	5	15	–	40	-25	6
5	IK Vikingen	8	0	0	8	2	–	18	-16	0

=== Göteborgsserien klass II 1905 ===
	Team	Pld	W	D	L	GF		GA	GD	Pts
1	Örgryte IS 2	12	11	0	1	61	–	13	+48	22
2	Krokslätts IK	12	10	0	2	40	–	10	+30	20
3	Jonsereds FK	12	6	2	4	29	–	16	+13	14
4	IS Göterna	12	4	3	5	27	–	31	-4	11
5	IFK Göteborg 2	12	4	3	5	16	–	25	-9	11
6	IS Idrottens Vänner	12	2	1	9	20	–	31	-11	5
7	Bohus BK 2	12	0	1	11	11	–	78	-67	1

=== Svenska Mästerskapet 1905 ===
Final

29 October 1905

Örgryte IS	2–1	IFK Stockholm

Idrottsparken, Stockholm

=== Kamratmästerskapen 1905 ===
Final

5 November 1905

IFK Stockholm	4–1	IFK Köping

Djurgårdsplanen, Eskilstuna

=== Wicanderska Välgörenhetsskölden 1905 ===
Final

17 September 1905

IFK Stockholm	4–0	AIK

Idrottsparken, Stockholm
