= 1892 in Swedish football =

The 1892 season in Swedish football, starting January 1892 and ending December 1892:

== Events ==
- 22 May 1892: Örgryte IS meet IS Lyckans Soldater in the first football match ever played on Swedish soil between two Swedish teams using the association football rules. The duration of play is 40 minutes, played in two halves. Six Scots are part of Örgryte IS's team which gives them the upper hand, and Örgryte IS scores the only goal of the match in the 17th minute of the second half, winning 1–0 (0–0). The match is played on Heden in Gothenburg and is part of a larger sport festival arranged by Göteborgs Gymnastiksällskap which is witnessed by between 4,000 and 7,000 people.
