= 1890 in Swedish football =

The 1890 season in Swedish football, starting January 1890 and ending December 1890:

== Events ==
- 14 September 1890: Halmstads Bollklubb (not related to present day Halmstads BK) plays Akademisk Boldklub from Copenhagen, Denmark, in what has earlier been believed to be the first match played on Swedish soil using the association football rules. New research has shown that the match, played on Tivolitorget in Halmstad, was played using the Swedish football rules, a combination of association and Rugby football rules. The match is still considered to be the first international football (in the wider sense) match with Swedish participation.
- 12 October 1890: The first football match on Swedish soil using the association football rules is played when two teams of Kjøbenhavns Boldklub (KB) from Copenhagen, Denmark, visits Malmö and plays an exhibition match on Rörsjöbanan, owned by Malmö Velocipedklubb (MVK), a cycling club. A few football-interested members of MVK wrote a letter to KB earlier that year, asking the Danes if they could send the charter of the club as well as the association rules, but KB instead proposed that they could visit Sweden to promote the sport. The Danish club also gave a copy of their set of rules and two footballs to Malmö VK which soon after created a football department.
- October 1890: The first set of printed association football rules in Swedish are distributed by Gleerupska pappershandelns förlag in Lund. The rules are a translation of the rules given to MVK by Kjøbenhavns Boldklub earlier the same month.
