= 1906 in Swedish football =

The 1906 season in Swedish football, starting January 1906 and ending December 1906:

== Honours ==
=== Official titles ===
Title	Team	Reason
Swedish Champions 1906	Örgryte IS	Winners of Svenska Mästerskapet

=== Competitions ===
Level	Competition	Team
Regional league	Stockholmsserien klass 1 1906	Djurgårdens IF
Regional league	Stockholmsserien klass 2 1906	Eriksdals IF
Regional league	Göteborgsserien klass I 1906	Örgryte IS 2
Regional league	Göteborgsserien klass II 1906	IFK Göteborg 2
Championship Cup	Svenska Mästerskapet 1906	Örgryte IS
Cup competition	Corinthian Bowl 1906	Örgryte IS
Cup competition	Kamratmästerskapen 1906	IFK Stockholm
Cup competition	Wicanderska Välgörenhetsskölden 1906	IFK Stockholm

== Promotions, relegations and qualifications ==
=== Promotions ===
Promoted from	Promoted to	Team	Reason
Stockholmsserien klass 2 1906	Stockholmsserien klass 1 1907	Eriksdals IF	Unknown
Stockholmsserien klass 2 1906	Stockholmsserien klass 1 1907	Östermalms IF	Unknown
Unknown	Stockholmsserien klass 2 1907	Djurgårdens SK	Unknown
Unknown	Stockholmsserien klass 2 1907	IK Göta	Unknown
Unknown	Stockholmsserien klass 2 1907	IF Vesta	Unknown
Göteborgsserien klass II 1906	Göteborgsserien klass I 1907	IFK Göteborg 2	Unknown
Göteborgsserien klass II 1906	Göteborgsserien klass I 1907	Jonsereds GIF	Unknown

=== Relegations ===
Relegated from	Relegated to	Team	Reason
Stockholmsserien klass 1 1906	Stockholmsserien klass 2 1907	AIK	Unknown
Stockholmsserien klass 1 1906	Stockholmsserien klass 2 1907	Westermalms IF	Unknown
Stockholmsserien klass 2 1906	Unknown	BS Drott	Unknown
Stockholmsserien klass 2 1906	Unknown	Skeppsholmens IK	Unknown
Stockholmsserien klass 2 1906	Unknown	Stockholms IK	Unknown
Göteborgsserien klass I 1906	Unknown	Göteborgs IF	Unknown
Göteborgsserien klass II 1906	Unknown	GAIS 2	No Göteborgsserien kl. II next season
Göteborgsserien klass II 1906	Unknown	Göteborgs IF 2	No Göteborgsserien kl. II next season
Göteborgsserien klass II 1906	Unknown	IS Göterna	No Göteborgsserien kl. II next season
Göteborgsserien klass II 1906	Unknown	Holmens IS	No Göteborgsserien kl. II next season
Göteborgsserien klass II 1906	Unknown	IK Spiran	No Göteborgsserien kl. II next season
Göteborgsserien klass II 1906	Unknown	Örgryte IS 3	No Göteborgsserien kl. II next season

== Domestic results ==
=== Stockholmsserien klass 1 1906 ===
	Team	Pld	W	D	L	GF		GA	GD	Pts
1	Djurgårdens IF	10	6	3	1	18	–	5	+13	15
2	IFK Stockholm	10	4	4	2	20	–	12	+8	12
3	IFK Uppsala	10	3	5	2	19	–	13	+6	11
4	Mariebergs IK	10	4	2	4	11	–	13	-2	10
5	AIK	10	4	2	4	13	–	20	-7	10
6	Westermalms IF	10	0	2	8	8	–	26	-18	2

=== Stockholmsserien klass 2 1906 ===
	Team	Pld	W	D	L	GF		GA	GD	Pts
1	Eriksdals IF	10	7	1	2	18	–	6	+12	15
2	Östermalms IF	10	6	0	4	13	–	16	-3	12
3	BS Drott	10	5	2	3	13	–	13	0	12
4	Skeppsholmens IK	10	5	1	4	15	–	10	+5	11
5	Södermalms IK	10	3	0	7	8	–	14	-6	6
6	Stockholms IK	10	1	2	7	9	–	17	-8	4

=== Göteborgsserien klass I 1906 ===
	Team	Pld	W	D	L	GF		GA	GD	Pts
=1	Örgryte IS 2	8	6	1	1	18	–	5	+13	13
=1	IFK Göteborg	8	6	1	1	20	–	9	+11	13
3	Krokslätts IK	8	4	0	4	5	–	11	-6	8
4	IK Vikingen	8	3	0	5	8	–	23	-15	6
5	Göteborgs IF	8	0	0	8	4	–	7	-3	0

Title-deciding match

November 18, 1906

Örgryte IS 2	4–0	IFK Göteborg

Idrottsplatsen, Gothenburg

=== Göteborgsserien klass II 1906 ===
	Team	Pld	W	D	L	GF		GA	GD	Pts
1	IFK Göteborg 2	14	12	1	1	32	–	9	+23	25
2	Jonsereds GIF	14	12	1	1	43	–	15	+28	25
3	IS Göterna	14	8	2	4	22	–	13	+9	18
4	Örgryte IS 3	14	7	2	5	33	–	27	+6	16
5	Holmens IS	14	6	2	6	21	–	19	+2	14
6	IK Spiran	14	4	1	9	4	–	32	-28	9
7	Göteborgs IF 2	14	0	2	12	5	–	35	-30	2
8	GAIS 2	14	0	1	13	1	–	11	-10	1

=== Svenska Mästerskapet 1906 ===
Final

October 7, 1906

Örgryte IS	4–3	Djurgårdens IF

Idrottsparken, Stockholm

=== Corinthian Bowl 1906 ===
Final

May 24, 1906

Örgryte IS	5–0	IFK Stockholm

Idrottsplatsen, Gothenburg

=== Kamratmästerskapen 1906 ===
Final

October 28, 1906

IFK Stockholm	10–3	IFK Göteborg

Idrottsparken, Stockholm

=== Wicanderska Välgörenhetsskölden 1906 ===
Final

October 14, 1906

IFK Stockholm	6–4	AIK

Idrottsparken, Stockholm
