= 1972 in Swedish football =

The 1972 season in Swedish football, starting April 1972 and ending November 1972:

== Honours ==
=== Official titles ===
Title	Team	Reason
Swedish Champions 1972	Åtvidabergs FF	Winners of Allsvenskan
Swedish Cup Champions 1971–1972	Landskrona BoIS	Winners of Svenska Cupen
