= 1978 in Swedish football =

The 1978 season in Swedish football, starting April 1978 and ending November 1978:

== Honours ==
=== Official titles ===
Title	Team	Reason
Swedish Champions 1978	Östers IF	Winners of Allsvenskan
Swedish Cup Champions 1977–1978	Malmö FF	Winners of Svenska Cupen
