= 1953–54 in Swedish football =

The 1953–54 season in Swedish football, starting August 1953 and ending July 1954:

== Honours ==
=== Official titles ===
Title	Team	Reason
Swedish Champions 1953–54	GAIS	Winners of Allsvenskan
Swedish Cup Champions 1953	Malmö FF	Winners of Svenska Cupen
