= 1975 in Swedish football =

The 1975 season in Swedish football, starting April 1975 and ending November 1975:

== Honours ==
=== Official titles ===
Title	Team	Reason
Swedish Champions 1975	Malmö FF	Winners of Allsvenskan
Swedish Cup Champions 1974–1975	Malmö FF	Winners of Svenska Cupen
