= 2016 in Swedish football =

Football in Sweden
- Season: 2016

Men's football
- Allsvenskan: Malmö FF
- Svenska Cupen: BK Häcken

The 2016 season was the 119th season of competitive football in Sweden. Sweden was participating in qualifying for the 2018 FIFA World Cup after UEFA Euro 2016.

== Domestic results ==
=== Men's football ===
==== 2016 Allsvenskan ====
Pos	Team	Pld	W	D	L	GF	GA	GD	Pts	Qualification or relegation
1	Malmö FF (C)	30	21	3	6	60	26	+34	66	Qualification for the Champions League second qualifying round
2	AIK	30	17	9	4	52	26	+26	60	Qualification for the Europa League first qualifying round
3	IFK Norrköping	30	18	6	6	59	37	+22	60	Qualification for the Europa League first qualifying round
4	IFK Göteborg	30	14	8	8	56	47	+9	50	
5	IF Elfsborg	30	13	9	8	58	38	+20	48	
6	Kalmar FF	30	12	8	10	45	40	+5	44	
7	Djurgårdens IF	30	14	1	15	48	47	+1	43	
8	Östersunds FK	30	12	6	12	44	46	−2	42	Qualification for the Europa League second qualifying round (Note: Östersunds FK qualified for the Europa League second qualifying round by winning the 2016–17 Svenska Cupen.)
9	Örebro SK	30	11	8	11	48	51	−3	41	
10	BK Häcken	30	11	7	12	58	45	+13	40	
11	Hammarby IF	30	10	9	11	46	49	−3	39	
12	Jönköpings Södra IF	30	8	11	11	32	39	−7	35	
13	GIF Sundsvall	30	7	9	14	38	54	−16	30	
14	Helsingborgs IF (R)	30	8	5	17	34	52	−18	29	Qualification for the relegation play-offs
15	Gefle IF (R)	30	6	9	15	34	56	−22	27	Relegation to the Superettan
16	Falkenbergs FF (R)	30	2	4	24	25	84	−59	10	Relegation to the Superettan

Source: svenskfotboll.se (in Swedish)
Rules for classification: 1) Points; 2) Goal difference; 3) Goals scored; 4) Head-to-head points; 5) Head-to-head goal difference; 6) Head-to-head away goals scored; 7) Play-off
(Note: Play-off is only played if need to decide champion, teams for relegation or UEFA competition and will be played on a neutral ground).
(C) Champions; (R) Relegated

==== 2017 Allsvenskan playoffs ====
17 November 2016
18:30 (UTC+1)

Halmstads BK	1–1	Helsingborgs IF
Helstrup 85' (o.g.)	Report	Eriksson 74'

Örjans Vall, Halmstad
Attendance: 6,104
Referee: Jonas Eriksson (Sigtuna)

20 November 2016
13:30 (UTC+1)

Helsingborgs IF	1–2	Halmstads BK
Larsson 81'	Report	Mathisen 86' (pen.), 89'

Olympia, Helsingborg
Attendance: 11,074
Referee: Stefan Johannesson (Täby)

Halmstads BK won 3–2 on aggregate.

==== 2016 Superettan ====
Pos	Team	Pld	W	D	L	GF	GA	GD	Pts	Promotion, qualification or relegation
1	IK Sirius (C, P)	30	18	7	5	54	23	+31	61	Promotion to Allsvenskan
2	AFC United (P)	30	18	7	5	50	20	+30	61	Promotion to Allsvenskan
3	Halmstads BK (O, P)	30	16	6	8	43	28	+15	54	Qualification to Promotion playoffs
4	Dalkurd FF	30	14	11	5	41	24	+17	53	
5	Varbergs BoIS	30	14	6	10	33	37	−4	48	
6	Åtvidabergs FF	30	13	5	12	53	53	0	44	
7	Trelleborgs FF	30	10	10	10	39	35	+4	40	
8	GAIS	30	9	12	9	45	36	+9	39	
9	Örgryte IS	30	11	6	13	42	44	−2	39	
10	IK Frej	30	9	11	10	38	42	−4	38	
11	IFK Värnamo	30	8	11	11	35	40	−5	35	
12	Degerfors IF	30	8	9	13	34	54	−20	33	
13	Syrianska FC (O)	30	7	11	12	26	37	−11	32	Qualification to Relegation playoffs
14	Assyriska FF (R)	30	6	10	14	36	47	−11	28	Qualification to Relegation playoffs
15	Ljungskile SK (R)	30	6	8	16	34	48	−14	26	Relegation to Division 1
16	Ängelholms FF (R)	30	4	8	18	22	57	−35	20	Relegation to Division 1

Source: svenskfotboll.se (in Swedish)
Rules for classification: 1) Points; 2) Goal difference; 3) Number of goals scored; 4) Head-to-head points; 5) Head-to-head goal difference; 6) Head-to-head away goals scored
(C) Champions; (O) Play-off winners; (P) Promoted; (R) Relegated

==== 2016 Superettan play-offs ====
9 November 2016
19:00 (UTC+1)

Norrby IF	2–0	Assyriska FF
Krasnici 70'; Savolainen 79'	Report

Borås Arena, Borås
Attendance: 1,341
Referee: Patrik Eriksson (Gävle)
13 November 2016
17:00 (UTC+1)

Vasalunds IF	0–2	Syrianska FC
	Report	Mete 25', 63'

Skytteholms IP, Solna
Attendance: 957
Referee: Johan Krantz (Uppsala)

13 November 2016
15:00 (UTC+1)

Assyriska FF	2–2	Norrby IF
Genc 49'; Konwea 88'	Report	Yarsuvat 11', 57'

Södertälje Fotbollsarena, Södertälje
Attendance: 1,032
Referee: Robert Daradic (Helsingborg)

Norrby IF won 4–2 on aggregate.

16 November 2016
19:00 (UTC+1)

Syrianska FC	3–1	Vasalunds IF
Mete 30'; Arquin 42'; Akintioye 73'	Report	Kabran 81'

Södertälje Fotbollsarena, Södertälje
Attendance: 1,824
Referee: Magnus Lindgren (Gothenburg)

Syrianska FC won 5–1 on aggregate.

== National teams ==
=== Sweden men's national football team ===
==== UEFA Euro 2016 ====
Pos	Team	Pld	W	D	L	GF	GA	GD	Pts	Qualification
1	Italy	3	2	0	1	3	1	+2	6 (Note: Head-to-head result: Belgium 0–2 Italy.)	Advance to knockout stage
2	Belgium	3	2	0	1	4	2	+2	6	Advance to knockout stage
3	Republic of Ireland	3	1	1	1	2	4	−2	4	Advance to knockout stage
4	Sweden	3	0	1	2	1	3	−2	1	

Source: UEFA
Rules for classification: Group stage tiebreakers
Notes:

Win Draw Loss

13 June 2016 Group stage	Republic of Ireland	1–1	Sweden	Saint-Denis, France
18:00	Hoolahan 47'		Clark 71' (o.g.)	Stadium: Stade de France; Attendance: 73,419; Referee: Milorad Mažić (Serbia)

17 June 2016 Group stage	Italy	1–0	Sweden	Toulouse, France
15:00	Éder 88'			Stadium: Stadium Municipal; Attendance: 29,600; Referee: Viktor Kassai (Hungary)

22 June 2016 Group stage	Sweden	0–1	Belgium	Nice, France
21:00			Nainggolan 84'	Stadium: Allianz Riviera, Nice; Attendance: 34,011; Referee: Felix Brych (Germany)

==== Friendlies and qualifications ====
Win Draw Loss

6 January 2016 Friendly	Sweden	1–1	Estonia	Abu Dhabi, United Arab Emirates
19:45 UTC+4	Ishak 70'	Report	Prosa 56'	Stadium: Armed Forces Stadium; Attendance: 100; Referee: Ahmad Salem Khalfan (United Arab Emirates)

10 January 2016 Friendly	Finland	0–3	Sweden	Abu Dhabi, United Arab Emirates
18:45 UTC+4		Report	Salomonsson 45+1' (pen.); Hallberg 46'; Kujović 59'	Stadium: Armed Forces Stadium; Attendance: 50; Referee: Abdullah Al Ajel (United Arab Emirates)

24 March 2016 Friendly	Turkey	2–1	Sweden	Antalya, Turkey
20:45	Tosun 32' 81'	Report	Källström (yellow card) 55'; Granqvist 74'	Stadium: New Antalya Stadium; Attendance: 33,000; Referee: Danny Makkelie (Netherlands)

29 March 2016 Friendly	Sweden	1–1	Czech Republic	Solna, Sweden
20:30	Berg 14'	Report	Vydra 26'	Stadium: Friends Arena; Attendance: 18,745; Referee: Bas Nijhuis (Netherlands)

30 May 2016 Friendly	Sweden	0–0	Slovenia	Malmö, Sweden
19:30		Report	Jokić (yellow card) 64'; Kurtić (yellow card) 75'; Krajnc (yellow card) 86'	Stadium: Swedbank Stadium; Attendance: 16,925; Referee: Jakob Kehlet (Denmark)

5 June 2016 Friendly	Sweden	3–0	Wales	Solna, Sweden
16:00	Forsberg 40'; Lustig 57'; Guidetti 87'	Report		Stadium: Friends Arena; Attendance: 37,942; Referee: Tobias Welz (Germany)

6 September 2016 2018 WCQ	Sweden	1–1	Netherlands	Solna, Sweden
20:45	Berg 43'	Report (UEFA)	Sneijder 67'	Stadium: Friends Arena; Attendance: 36,128; Referee: Daniele Orsato (Italy)

7 October 2016 2018 WCQ	Luxembourg	0–1	Sweden	Luxembourg City, Luxembourg
20:45		Report (UEFA)	Lustig 58'	Stadium: Stade Josy Barthel; Attendance: 5,057; Referee: Ivan Bebek (Croatia)

10 October 2016 2018 WCQ	Sweden	3–0	Bulgaria	Solna, Sweden
20:45	Toivonen 39'; Hiljemark 45'; Lindelöf 58'	Report (UEFA)		Stadium: Friends Arena; Attendance: 21,777; Referee: Michael Oliver (England)

11 November 2016 2018 WCQ	France	2–1	Sweden	Saint-Denis, France
20:45	Pogba 57'; Payet 65'	Report (UEFA)	Forsberg 54'	Stadium: Stade de France; Attendance: 80,000; Referee: Milorad Mažić (Serbia)

15 November 2016 Friendly	Hungary	0–2	Sweden	Budapest, Hungary
19:45		Report	Larsson 30'; Kiese Thelin 67'	Stadium: Groupama Arena; Attendance: 16,842; Referee: Paolo Valeri (Italy)

=== Sweden men's national under-23 football team ===
==== 2016 Summer Olympics ====
Pos	Team	Pld	W	D	L	GF	GA	GD	Pts	Qualification
1	Nigeria	3	2	0	1	6	6	0	6	Quarter-finals
2	Colombia	3	1	2	0	6	4	+2	5	Quarter-finals
3	Japan	3	1	1	1	7	7	0	4	
4	Sweden	3	0	1	2	2	4	−2	1	

Source: Rio2016 & FIFA
Rules for classification: Tiebreakers

Win Draw Loss

4 August 2016 Group stage	Sweden	2–2	Colombia	Manaus, Brazil
18:00 (UTC–4)	Ishak 43'; Ajdarević 62'	Report	Gutiérrez 17'; Pabón 75'	Stadium: Arena da Amazônia; Attendance: 29,996; Referee: Fahad Al-Mirdasi (Saudi Arabia)

7 August 2016 Group stage	Sweden	0–1	Nigeria	Manaus, Brazil
18:00 (UTC–4)		Report	Sadiq 40'	Stadium: Arena da Amazônia; Attendance: 23,892; Referee: Matthew Conger (New Zealand)

10 August 2016 Group stage	Japan	1–0	Sweden	Salvador, Brazil
19:00 (UTC–4)	Yajima 65'	Report		Stadium: Itaipava Arena Fonte Nova; Attendance: 17,821; Referee: Malang Diedhiou (Senegal)

==== Friendlies ====
30 July 2016	South Korea	3–2	Sweden	São Paulo, Brazil
20:00 (UTC-3)	Moon 38', 41'; Ryu 54'	Report	Sema 26'; Une Larsson 57'	Stadium: Pacaembu Stadium; Attendance: 11,256; Referee: Raphael Claus (Brazil)

=== Sweden men's national under-21 football team ===
==== 2017 UEFA European Under-21 Championship qualification ====
Pos	Team	Pld	W	D	L	GF	GA	GD	Pts	Qualification
1	Sweden	10	7	3	0	24	7	+17	24	Final tournament
2	Spain	10	7	2	1	31	9	+22	23	Play-offs
3	Croatia	10	6	2	2	24	11	+13	20	
4	Georgia	10	4	1	5	17	17	0	13	
5	Estonia	10	1	1	8	3	26	−23	4	
6	San Marino	10	0	1	9	1	30	−29	1	

Source: UEFA
Rules for classification: Qualification tiebreakers

Win Draw Loss

27 March 2016 UEFA Under-21 2017	San Marino	0–2	Sweden	Serravalle, San Marino
19:30 (UTC+2)		Report (UEFA)	Fransson 37'; Gustafson 81'	Stadium: San Marino Stadium; Attendance: 244; Referee: Yaroslav Kozyk (Ukraine)

3 June 2016 UEFA Under-21 2017	Sweden	3–2	Georgia	Uddevalla, Sweden
19:30 (UTC+2)	Olsson 27' (pen.); Krafth 77'; Larsson 90+5'	Report (UEFA)	Arabuli 35'; Kiteishvili 89'	Stadium: Rimnersvallen; Attendance: 2,200; Referee: Markus Hameter (Austria)

1 September 2016 UEFA Under-21 2017	Croatia	1–1	Sweden	Koprivnica, Croatia
18:00 (UTC+2)	Perica 78'	Report (UEFA)	Cibicki 57'	Stadium: Gradski stadion Attendance: 2,789; Referee: Bastian Dankert (Germany)

5 September 2016 UEFA Under-21 2017	Sweden	1–1	Spain	Malmö, Sweden
18:45 (UTC+2)	Merino 86' (o.g.)	Report (UEFA)	Deulofeu 50'	Stadium: Swedbank Stadion; Attendance: 4,454; Referee: Hugo Miguel (Portugal)

6 October 2016 UEFA Under-21 2017	Estonia	0–3	Sweden	Pärnu, Estonia
17:00 (UTC+3)		Report (UEFA)	Dagerstål 9'; Tanković 44'; Asoro 53'	Stadium: Pärnu Rannastaadion; Attendance: 607; Referee: Stephan Klossner (Switzerland)

10 October 2016 UEFA Under-21 2017	Sweden	4–2	Croatia	Trelleborg, Sweden
18:45 (UTC+2)	Wahlqvist 26' (pen.); Olsson 53'; Hallberg 58'; Strandberg 64'	Report (UEFA)	Perica 23'; Benković 67'	Stadium: Vångavallen; Attendance: 2,784; Referee: Bartosz Frankowski (Poland)

=== Sweden men's national under-17 football team ===
==== 2016 UEFA European Under-17 Championship ====
Group C
Pos	Team	Pld	W	D	L	GF	GA	GD	Pts	Qualification
1	Sweden	3	2	0	1	3	2	+1	6	Knockout stage
2	England	3	2	0	1	6	3	+3	6	Knockout stage
3	Denmark	3	1	1	1	2	3	−1	4	
4	France	3	0	1	2	0	3	−3	1	

Source: UEFA
Rules for classification: Group stage tiebreakers

Win Draw Loss

6 May 2016 Group stage	England	1–2	Sweden	Baku, Azerbaijan
	Nelson 62'		Asoro 4', 59'	Stadium: Azersun Arena; Referee: Svein-Erik Edvartsen (Norway)

9 May 2016 Group stage	Denmark	1–0	Sweden	Baku, Azerbaijan
	Buch Jensen 80+3'			Stadium: Baku Olympic Stadium; Referee: Mitja Žganec (Slovenia)

12 May 2016 Group stage	Sweden	1–0	France	Baku, Azerbaijan
	Bergqvist 45'			Stadium: Azersun Arena; Referee: Bartosz Frankowski (Poland)

15 May 2016 Quarter-final	Sweden	0–1	Netherlands	Baku, Azerbaijan
18:00	Simon Marklund (yellow card) 40+1'; Anel Ahmedhodzic (yellow card) 44'; Teddy Bergqvist (yellow card) 80'	Report	Wehrmann (yellow card) 43'; Tahith Chong 62'; Vente (yellow card) 80+1'	Stadium: Bakcell Arena; Referee: Ville Nevalainen (Finland)

=== Sweden women's national football team ===
==== 2016 Summer Olympics ====
Pos	Team	Pld	W	D	L	GF	GA	GD	Pts	Qualification
1	Brazil (H)	3	2	1	0	8	1	+7	7	Quarter-finals
2	China	3	1	1	1	2	3	−1	4	Quarter-finals
3	Sweden	3	1	1	1	2	5	−3	4	Quarter-finals
4	South Africa	3	0	1	2	0	3	−3	1	

Source: Rio2016 & FIFA
Rules for classification: Tiebreakers
(H) Hosts

Win Draw Loss

3 August 2016 Group stage	Sweden	1-0	South Africa	Rio de Janeiro, Brazil
	Fischer 76'	Report		Stadium: Estádio Olímpico João Havelange; Referee: Teodora Albon (Romania)

6 August 2016 Group stage	Brazil	5–1	Sweden	Rio de Janeiro, Brazil
	Beatriz 21', 86'; Cristiane 24'; Marta 44' (pen.), 80'	Report	Schelin 89'	Stadium: Estádio Olímpico João Havelange; Attendance: 43,384; Referee: Lucila Venegas (Mexico)

9 August 2016 Group stage	China	0–0	Sweden	Brasília, Brazil
		Report		Stadium: Estádio Nacional Mané Garrincha; Attendance: 7,648; Referee: Olga Miranda (Paraguay)

12 August 2016 Quarter finals	United States	1–1 (a.e.t.) (3–4 p)	Sweden	Brasília, Brazil
	Morgan 77'	Report	Blackstenius 61'	Stadium: Estádio Nacional Mané Garrincha; Attendance: 13,892; Referee: Anna-Marie Keighley (New Zealand)
	Penalties
	Morgan (penalty missed); Horan (penalty scored); Lloyd (penalty scored); Brian (penalty scored); Press (penalty missed)		(penalty scored) Schelin; (penalty scored) Asllani; (penalty missed) Sembrant; (penalty scored) Seger; (penalty scored) Dahlkvist

16 August 2016 Semifinals	Brazil	0-0 (a.e.t.) (3–4 p)	Sweden	Rio de Janeiro, Brazil
		Report		Stadium: Maracanã Stadium; Attendance: 70,454; Referee: Lucila Venegas (Mexico)
	Penalties
	Marta (penalty scored); Cristiane (penalty missed); Andressa Alves (penalty scored); Rafaelle (penalty scored); Andressa (penalty missed)		(penalty scored) Schelin; (penalty missed) Asllani; (penalty scored) Seger; (penalty scored) Fischer; (penalty scored) Dahlkvist

19 August 2016 Final	Sweden	1–2	Germany	Rio de Janeiro, Brazil
	Blackstenius 67'		=Marozsán 48'; Sembrant 62' (o.g.)	Stadium: Maracanã Stadium; Attendance: 52,432; Referee: Carol Chenard (Canada)

==== Friendlies and qualifications ====
Win Draw Loss

26 January 2016 Friendly	Sweden	6–0	Scotland	Gothenburg, Sweden
	Dahlkvist 40'; Eriksson 45'; Jakobsson 45+1'; Schelin 68'; Hammarlund 78', 83'	Report		Stadium: Prioritet Serneke Arena; Attendance: 1,241; Referee: Lina Lehtovaara (Finland)

2 March 2016 2016 OQT	Norway	0–1	Sweden	Rotterdam, Netherlands
19:30		Report	Dahlkvist 3'	Stadium: Stadion Woudestein; Attendance: 401; Referee: Bibiana Steinhaus (Germany)

5 March 2016 2016 OQT	Sweden	1–0	Switzerland	Rotterdam, Netherlands
19:30	Seger 44'	Report		Stadium: Stadion Woudestein; Referee: Katalin Kulcsár (Hungary)

9 March 2016 2016 OQT	Netherlands	1–1	Sweden	Rotterdam, Netherlands
19:30	Miedema 5'	Report	Schough 45'	Stadium: Stadion Woudestein; Referee: Kateryna Monzul (Ukraine)

8 April 2016 2017 ECQ	Slovakia	0–3	Sweden	Poprad, Slovakia
17:00		Summary	Appelqvist 27'; Seger 55'; Blackstenius 63'	Stadium: Národné Tréningové Centrum; Attendance: 646; Referee: (Greece) Eleni Lampadariou

2 June 2016 2017 ECQ	Poland	0–4	Sweden	Łódź
18:00	Sylwia Matysik (yellow card) 47'; Anna Szymańska (yellow card) 60'; Ewelina Kamczyk (yellow card) 81'; Konsek (yellow card) 90+4'	Summary	Ilestedt 40'; Schelin 60'; Ericsson (yellow card) 64'; Asllani 70'; Rolfö 87'; Samuelsson (yellow card) 90'; Berglund (yellow card) 90+3'	Stadium: Stadion ŁKS; Attendance: 1,724; Referee: (Czech Republic) Olga Zadinova

6 June 2016 2017 ECQ	Sweden	6–0	Moldova	Gothenburg, Sweden
17:45	Natalia Munteanu 34' (o.g.); Asllani 41' 61'; Rolfö 48' 88'; Berglund 90+3'	Summary		Stadium: Gamla Ullevi; Attendance: 9,168; Referee: (Italy) Craziella Pirratore

15 September 2016 2017 ECQ	Sweden	2–1	Slovakia	Gothenburg, Sweden
				Stadium: Gamla Ullevi

20 September 2016 2017 ECQ	Denmark	2–0	Sweden

20 October 2016 Friendly	Sweden	7–0	Iran	Gothenburg, Sweden
18:45	Larsson 4'; Eriksson 14', 24', 45+2'; Schough 16', 33', 45'	Summary		Stadium: Gamla Ullevi; Attendance: 1,736; Referee: Petra Pavlikova (Slovakia)

23 October 2016 Friendly	Norway	0–0	Sweden	Kristiansand, Norway
				Stadium: Sør Arena

=== Sweden women's national under-19 football team ===
==== 2016 FIFA U-20 Women's World Cup ====
Group A
Pos	Team	Pld	W	D	L	GF	GA	GD	Pts	Qualification
1	North Korea	3	3	0	0	13	3	+10	9	Knockout stage
2	Brazil	3	1	1	1	12	5	+7	4	Knockout stage
3	Sweden	3	1	1	1	7	3	+4	4	
4	Papua New Guinea (H)	3	0	0	3	1	22	−21	0	

Source: FIFA
(H) Hosts

Win Draw Loss

13 November 2016 Group stage	Sweden	0 - 2	North Korea	Port Moresby, Papua New Guinea
06:00		Summary	Hyang-sim 25'; So-hyang 48'	Stadium: Sir John Guise Stadium; Attendance: 4,944; Referee: (Honduras) Melissa Borjas

16 November 2016 Group stage	Papua New Guinea	0 - 6	Sweden	Port Moresby, Papua New Guinea
09:00		Summary	Blackstenius 8' 43' 58' 72'; Kaneryd 75'; Anvegård 82'	Stadium: Sir John Guise Stadium; Referee: (Myanmar) Aye Thein

20 November 2016 Group stage	Brazil	1 - 1	Sweden	Port Moresby, Papua New Guinea
09:00	Gabriela 31'; Geyse (yellow card) 44'; Daiane (yellow card) 51'; Yasmim (yellow card) 90+1'	Summary	Blackstenius 14'	Stadium: PNG Football Stadium; Attendance: 3,553; Referee: (China) Qin Liang
