= 1950–51 in Swedish football =

The 1950–51 season in Swedish football, starting August 1950 and ending July 1951:

== Honours ==
=== Official titles ===
Title	Team	Reason
Swedish Champions 1950–51	Malmö FF	Winners of Allsvenskan
Swedish Cup Champions 1950	AIK	Winners of Svenska Cupen

=== Competitions ===
Level	Competition	Team
1st level	Allsvenskan 1950–51	Malmö FF
2nd level	Division 2 Nordöstra 1950–51	Åtvidabergs FF
2nd level	Division 2 Sydvästra 1950–51	IFK Göteborg
Regional Championship	Norrländska Mästerskapet 1951	Skellefteå AIK
Cup	Svenska Cupen 1950	AIK

== Promotions, relegations and qualifications ==
=== Promotions ===
Promoted from	Promoted to	Team	Reason
Division 2 Nordöstra 1950–51	Allsvenskan 1951–52	Åtvidabergs FF	Winners
Division 2 Sydvästra 1950–51	Allsvenskan 1951–52	IFK Göteborg	Winners
Division 3 1950–51	Division 2 Nordöstra 1951–52	Ludvika FfI	Winners of Norra
Division 3 1950–51	Division 2 Nordöstra 1951–52	Motala AIF	Winners of Östra
Division 3 1950–51	Division 2 Sydvästra 1951–52	BK Häcken	Winners of Västra
Division 3 1950–51	Division 2 Sydvästra 1951–52	Ronneby BK	Winners of Södra

=== Relegations ===
Relegated from	Relegated to	Team	Reason
Allsvenskan 1950–51	Division 2 Nordöstra 1951–52	AIK	11th team
Allsvenskan 1950–51	Division 2 Sydvästra 1951–52	Kalmar FF	12th team
Division 2 Nordöstra 1950–51	Division 3 1951–52	Karlskoga IF	9th team
Division 2 Nordöstra 1950–51	Division 3 1951–52	Surahammars IF	10th team
Division 2 Sydvästra 1950–51	Division 3 1951–52	Örgryte IS	9th team
Division 2 Sydvästra 1950–51	Division 3 1951–52	Huskvarna Södra IS	10th team

== Domestic results ==
=== Allsvenskan 1950–51 ===

	Team	Pld	W	D	L	GF		GA	GD	Pts
1	Malmö FF	22	16	5	1	52	–	22	+30	37
2	Råå IF	22	12	4	6	44	–	27	+17	28
3	Degerfors IF	22	10	7	5	34	–	23	+11	27
4	Helsingborgs IF	22	11	3	8	43	–	29	+14	25
5	IFK Norrköping	22	11	3	8	38	–	29	+9	25
6	Djurgårdens IF	22	9	5	8	42	–	37	+5	23
7	GAIS	22	8	3	11	33	–	40	-7	19
8	Örebro SK	22	7	4	11	32	–	45	-13	18
9	Jönköpings Södra IF	22	7	4	11	37	–	54	-17	18
10	IF Elfsborg	22	6	5	11	31	–	41	-10	17
11	AIK	22	6	5	11	27	–	37	-10	17
12	Kalmar FF	22	2	6	14	25	–	54	-29	10

=== Division 2 Nordöstra 1950–51 ===

	Team	Pld	W	D	L	GF		GA	GD	Pts
1	Åtvidabergs FF	18	11	4	3	57	–	28	+29	26
2	Sandvikens IF	18	10	5	3	60	–	29	+31	25
3	IF Viken	18	7	7	4	39	–	28	+11	21
4	Hammarby IF	18	8	4	6	43	–	36	+7	20
5	IK City	18	7	3	8	36	–	36	0	17
6	Sandvikens AIK	18	6	5	7	41	–	44	-3	17
7	IK Brage	18	6	4	8	30	–	40	-10	16
8	Karlstads BIK	18	6	3	9	27	–	38	-11	15
9	Karlskoga IF	18	6	2	10	26	–	37	-11	14
10	Surahammars IF	18	4	1	13	22	–	55	-33	9

=== Division 2 Sydvästra 1950–51 ===
	Team	Pld	W	D	L	GF		GA	GD	Pts
1	IFK Göteborg	18	12	2	4	47	–	26	+21	26
2	IFK Malmö	18	10	4	4	47	–	25	+22	24
3	IS Halmia	18	10	3	5	35	–	26	+9	23
4	Lunds BK	18	8	4	6	33	–	31	+2	20
5	Landskrona BoIS	18	6	6	6	33	–	32	+1	18
6	Norrby IF	18	7	3	8	23	–	25	-2	17
7	Halmstads BK	18	6	5	7	28	–	34	-6	17
8	Höganäs BK	18	3	8	7	30	–	43	-13	14
9	Örgryte IS	18	5	3	10	25	–	30	-5	13
10	Huskvarna Södra IS	18	4	0	14	21	–	50	-29	8

=== Norrländska Mästerskapet 1951 ===
Final

July 15, 1951

GIF Sundsvall	0–12	Skellefteå AIK

Idrottsparken, Sundsvall

=== Svenska Cupen 1950 ===
Final

July 23, 1950

AIK	3–2	Helsingborgs IF

Råsunda, Solna

== National team results ==
September 3, 1950
Friendly
№ 286

Sweden	1–2	Yugoslavia
Lindskog 7'		Valok 11'; Herceg 27'

Råsunda, Solna
Attendance: 37,677
Referee: Leafe (England)

September 24, 1950
1948–51 Nordic Championship
№ 287

Norway	1–3	Sweden
Boye-Karlsen 88' (p)		Jönsson 53', 79'; Palmér 55'

Ullevaal, Oslo
Attendance: 35,522
Referee: Nyberg (Finland)

September 24, 1950
1948–51 Nordic Championship
№ 288

Finland	0–1	Sweden
		Rosén 82'

Olympiastadion, Helsinki
Attendance: 25,735
Referee: Asmussen (Denmark)

October 15, 1950
1948–51 Nordic Championship
№ 289

Sweden	4–0	Denmark
Granqvist 28'; Jönsson 29'; Bengtsson 36'; Ek 39'

Råsunda, Solna
Attendance: 37,500
Referee: Pedersen (Norway)

November 12, 1950
Friendly
№ 290

Switzerland	4–2	Sweden
Friedländer 20'; Antenen 22'; Fatton 54', 66'		Palmér 24'; Leander 48' (p)

Stade des Charmilles, Geneva
Attendance: 25,000
Referee: van der Meer (Netherlands)

June 10, 1951
Friendly
№ 291

Sweden	3–1	Turkey
Sandlin 57', 74'; Lundkvist 76'		Küçükandonyadis 48' (p)

Råsunda, Solna
Attendance: 19,992
Referee: Karni (Finland)

June 17, 1951
Friendly
№ 292

Sweden	0–0	Spain

Råsunda, Solna
Attendance: 26,729
Referee: Bernardi (Italy)

June 29, 1951
Friendly
№ 293

Iceland	4–3	Sweden
Jonsson 32', 38', 47', 79'		Larsson 76'; Jönsson 78', 88'

Melavöllur, Reykjavík
Attendance: 5,634
Referee: Einarsson (Iceland)
