= 1969 in Swedish football =

The 1969 season in Swedish football, starting April 1969 and ending November 1969:

== Honours ==
=== Official titles ===
Title	Team	Reason
Swedish Champions 1969	IFK Göteborg	Winners of Allsvenskan
Swedish Cup Champions 1968–1969	IFK Norrköping	Winners of Svenska Cupen
