= 1976 in Swedish football =

The 1976 season in Swedish football, starting April 1976 and ending November 1976:

== Honours ==
=== Official titles ===
Title	Team	Reason
Swedish Champions 1976	Halmstads BK	Winners of Allsvenskan
Swedish Cup Champions 1975–1976	AIK	Winners of Svenska Cupen
