= 1974 in Swedish football =

The 1974 season in Swedish football, starting April 1974 and ending November 1974:

== Honours ==
=== Official titles ===
Title	Team	Reason
Swedish Champions 1974	Malmö FF	Winners of Allsvenskan
Swedish Cup Champions 1973–1974	Malmö FF	Winners of Svenska Cupen
