= 1965 in Swedish football =

The 1965 season in Swedish football, starting April 1965 and ending November 1965:

== Honours ==
=== Official titles ===
Title	Team	Reason
Swedish Champions 1965	Malmö FF	Winners of Allsvenskan
