= 1967 in Swedish football =

The 1967 season in Swedish football, starting April 1967 and ending November 1967:

== Honours ==
=== Official titles ===
Title	Team	Reason
Swedish Champions 1967	Malmö FF	Winners of Allsvenskan
Swedish Cup Champions 1967	Malmö FF	Winners of Svenska Cupen
