= 1979 in Swedish football =

The 1979 season in Swedish football, starting April 1979 and ending November 1979.

== Honours ==
=== Official titles ===
Title	Team	Reason
Swedish Champions 1979	Halmstads BK	Winners of Allsvenskan
Swedish Cup Champions 1978–1979	IFK Göteborg	Winners of Svenska Cupen
