= 1977 in Swedish football =

The 1977 season in Swedish football, starting April 1977 and ending November 1977:

== Honours ==
=== Official titles ===
Title	Team	Reason
Swedish Champions 1977	Malmö FF	Winners of Allsvenskan
Swedish Cup Champions 1976–1977	Östers IF	Winners of Svenska Cupen
