= 1962 in Swedish football =

The 1962 season in Swedish football, starting April 1962 and ending November 1962:

== Honours ==
=== Official titles ===
Title	Team	Reason
Swedish Champions 1962	IFK Norrköping	Winners of Allsvenskan
