= 1973 in Swedish football =

The 1973 season in Swedish football, starting April 1973 and ending November 1973:

== Honours ==
=== Official titles ===
Title	Team	Reason
Swedish Champions 1973	Åtvidabergs FF	Winners of Allsvenskan
Swedish Cup Champions 1972–1973	Malmö FF	Winners of Svenska Cupen
