= 1971 in Swedish football =

The 1971 season in Swedish football, starting April 1971 and ending November 1971:

== Honours ==
=== Official titles ===
Title	Team	Reason
Swedish Champions 1971	Malmö FF	Winners of Allsvenskan
Swedish Cup Champions 1970–1971	Åtvidabergs FF	Winners of Svenska Cupen
