= IFK Stockholm =

Swedish football club

- Full name: Idrottsföreningen; Kamraterna Stockholm
- Founded: 1895
- Ground: Vårbergs IP, Stockholm
- Capacity: 1,000
- Chairman: Klas-Göran Hoffman
- League: Division 4 Stockholm Södra
- 2023: Division 4 Stockholm Södra, 6th
- Website: https://www.ifkstockholm.se
| Home colours | Away colours |

IFK Stockholm is a multi-sports club in Stockholm, Sweden. It is most known for its football team.

== Background ==
The club was formed 1 February 1895 as IF Kamraterna (IFK) by two young students, Louis Zettersten and Pehr Ehnemark, and was the first IFK club. The club soon changed name to IFK Stockholm to differentiate it from the other IFK clubs that were formed in various towns in Sweden.

The club had minor successes in the early days of Swedish football, but from 2008 to 2010, resided in Division 5, part of the regional leagues of the Swedish football league system. The club is affiliated to the Stockholms Fotbollförbund.

The club also sponsors bowling and swimming. It formerly also sponsored ice hockey and played its home games at the Hovet, formerly known as Johanneshovs Isstadion. It also played bandy, a sport in which it was the runner-up for the Swedish Championship in 1910. The men's bandy team has played seven seasons in the Swedish top division.

== Season to season ==
In their most successful period IFK Stockholm competed in the following divisions:

| Season | Level | Division | Section | Position | Movements |
|---|---|---|---|---|---|
| 1924–25 | Tier 2 | Division 2 | Östsvenska | 9th | |
| 1925–26 | Tier 2 | Division 2 | Östsvenska | 5th | |
| 1926–27 | Tier 2 | Division 2 | Östsvenska | 5th | |
| 1927–28 | Tier 2 | Division 2 | Östsvenska | 4th | |
| 1928–29 | Tier 2 | Division 2 | Norra | 9th | Relegated |
| 1929–30 | Tier 3 | Division 3 | Östsvenska | 4th | |
| 1930–31 | Tier 3 | Division 3 | Östsvenska | 6th | |
| 1931–32 | Tier 3 | Division 3 | Östsvenska | 3rd | Promoted |
| 1932–33 | Tier 3 | Division 3 | Östsvenska | 7th | |
| 1933–34 | Tier 3 | Division 3 | Östsvenska | 10th | Relegated |
| 1934–35 | Tier 4 | Division 4 | ? | ? | |
| 1935–36 | Tier 4 | Division 4 | ? | ? | |
| 1936–37 | Tier 4 | Division 4 | ? | ? | |
| 1937–38 | Tier 4 | Division 4 | ? | ? | |
| 1938–39 | Tier 4 | Division 4 | ? | ? | |
| 1939–40 | Tier 4 | Division 4 | ? | ? | |
| 1940–41 | Tier 4 | Division 4 | ? | ? | |
| 1941–42 | Tier 4 | Division 4 | ? | ? | |
| 1942–43 | Tier 4 | Division 4 | ? | ? | |
| 1943–44 | Tier 4 | Division 4 | ? | ? | |
| 1944–45 | Tier 4 | Division 4 | ? | ? | |
| 1945–46 | Tier 4 | Division 4 | ? | ? | |
| 1946–47 | Tier 4 | Division 4 | ? | ? | |
| 1947–48 | Tier 4 | Division 4 | ? | ? | |
| 1948–49 | Tier 4 | Division 4 | ? | ? | |
| 1949–50 | Tier 4 | Division 4 | ? | ? | |
| 1950–51 | Tier 4 | Division 4 | ? | ? | |
| 1951-52 | Tier 4 | Division 4 | ? | ? | |
| 1952-53 | Tier 4 | Division 4 | ? | 1st | Promoted |
| 1953–54 | Tier 3 | Division 3 | Östra Svealand | 4th | |
| 1954–55 | Tier 3 | Division 3 | Östra Svealand | 1st | Promoted |
| 1955–56 | Tier 2 | Division 2 | Svealand | 4th | |
| 1956–57 | Tier 2 | Division 2 | Svealand | 3rd | |
| 1957–58 | Tier 2 | Division 2 | Svealand | 7th | |
| 1959 | Tier 2 | Division 2 | Svealand | 5th | |
| 1960 | Tier 2 | Division 2 | Svealand | 6th | |
| 1961 | Tier 2 | Division 2 | Svealand | 2nd | |
| 1962 | Tier 2 | Division 2 | Svealand | 6th | |
| 1963 | Tier 2 | Division 2 | Svealand | 5th | |
| 1964 | Tier 2 | Division 2 | Svealand | 5th | |
| 1965 | Tier 2 | Division 2 | Svealand | 2nd | |
| 1966 | Tier 2 | Division 2 | Svealand | 2nd | |
| 1967 | Tier 2 | Division 2 | Svealand | 8th | |
| 1968 | Tier 2 | Division 2 | Svealand | 9th | |
| 1969 | Tier 2 | Division 2 | Svealand | 6th | |
| 1970 | Tier 2 | Division 2 | Svealand | 4th | |
| 1971 | Tier 2 | Division 2 | Svealand | 10th | Relegated |
| 1972 | Tier 3 | Division 3 | Östra Svealand | 1st | Promotion Playoffs - Not Promoted |
| 1973 | Tier 3 | Division 3 | Östra Svealand | 1st | Promotion Playoffs - Not Promoted |
| 1974 | Tier 3 | Division 3 | Östra Svealand | 12th | Relegated |
| 1975 | Tier 4 | Division 4 | Stockholm Norra | 12th | Relegated |

In recent seasons IFK Stockholm have competed in the following divisions:

| Season | Level | Division | Section | Position | Movements |
|---|---|---|---|---|---|
| 1993 | Tier 3 | Division 2 | Östra Svealand | 8th | |
| 1994 | Tier 3 | Division 2 | Östra Svealand | 12th | Relegated |
| 1995 | Tier 4 | Division 3 | Östra Svealand | 9th | Relegation Playoffs |
| 1996 | Tier 4 | Division 3 | Östra Svealand | 8th | |
| 1997 | Tier 4 | Division 3 | Östra Svealand | 4th | |
| 1998 | Tier 4 | Division 3 | Östra Svealand | 7th | |
| 1999 | Tier 4 | Division 3 | Östra Svealand | 10th | Relegated |
| 2000 | Tier 5 | Division 4 | Stockholm Södra | 4th | |
| 2001 | Tier 5 | Division 4 | Stockholm Mellersta | 10th | |
| 2002 | Tier 5 | Division 4 | Stockholm Mellersta | 5th | |
| 2003 | Tier 5 | Division 4 | Stockholm Mellersta | 3rd | |
| 2004 | Tier 5 | Division 4 | Stockholm Mellersta | 9th | |
| 2005 | Tier 5 | Division 4 | Stockholm Mellersta | 11th | |
| 2006* | Tier 6 | Division 4 | Stockholm Mellersta | 9th | |
| 2007 | Tier 6 | Division 4 | Stockholm Mellersta | 10th | Relegated |
| 2008 | Tier 7 | Division 5 | Stockholm Södra | 6th | |
| 2009 | Tier 7 | Division 5 | Stockholm Södra | 9th | |
| 2010 | Tier 7 | Division 5 | Stockholm Södra | 1st | Promoted |
| 2011 | Tier 6 | Division 4 | Stockholm Södra | 5th | |
| 2012 | Tier 6 | Division 4 | Stockholm Södra | 2nd | Promotion Playoffs – Promoted |
| 2013 | Tier 5 | Division 3 | Södra Svealand | 6th | |
| 2014 | Tier 5 | Division 3 | Södra Svealand | 2nd | Promotion Playoffs – Promoted |
| 2015 | Tier 4 | Division 2 | Södra Svealand | 12th | Relegation Playoffs - Relegated |
| 2016 | Tier 5 | Division 3 | Östra Svealand | 12th | Relegated |
| 2017 | Tier 6 | Division 4 | Stockholm Mellersta | 5th | |
| 2018 | Tier 6 | Division 4 | Stockholm Södra | 5th | |
| 2019 | Tier 6 | Division 4 | Stockholm Södra | 6th | |
| 2020 | Tier 6 | Division 4 | Stockholm Södra | 9th | |
| 2021 | Tier 6 | Division 4 | Stockholm Södra | 9th | |

* League restructuring in 2006 resulted in a new division being created at Tier 3 and subsequent divisions dropping a level.

== Attendances ==
In recent seasons IFK Stockholm have had the following average attendances:

| Season | Average attendance | Division / Section | Level |
|---|---|---|---|
| 2013 | 96 | Div 3 Södra Svealand | Tier 5 |
| 2014 | 90 | Div 3 Södra Svealand | Tier 5 |
| 2015 | 113 | Div 2 Södra Svealand | Tier 4 |
| 2016 | 57 | Div 3 Östra Svealand | Tier 5 |
| 2017 | 54 | Div 4 Stockholm Mellersta | Tier 6 |
| 2018 | 54 | Div 4 Stockholm Södra | Tier 6 |
| 2019 | ? | Div 4 Stockholm Södra | Tier 6 |
| 2020 | | Div 4 Stockholm Södra | Tier 6 |

* Attendances are provided in the Publikliga sections of the Svenska Fotbollförbundet website.

== Achievements ==
- Svenska Mästerskapet:
  - Runners-up (1): 1905
- Corinthian Bowl:
  - Runners-up (2): 1906, 1907
- Svenska Fotbollspokalen:
  - Runners-up (2): 1903 II
- Wicanderska Välgörenhetsskölden:
  - Winners (4): 1905, 1906, 1911, 1912
- Kamratmästerskapen:
  - Winners (5): 1903, 1905, 1906, 1907, 1908
  - Runners-up (6): 1911, 1912, 1913, 1914, 1919, 1922
