= Football at the 1912 Summer Olympics – Consolation tournament =

Tournament details
- Host country: Sweden
- Dates: 1 – 5 July 1912
- Teams: 7
- Venue: 3 (in 3 host cities)

Final positions
- Champions: Hungary
- Runners-up: Austria

Tournament statistics
- Matches played: 6
- Goals scored: 31 (5.17 per match)
- Top scorer(s): (Germany) Gottfried Fuchs (10 goals)

Football at the 1912 Summer Olympics – Consolation tournament was a repechage tournament contested by the seven losing teams of the first two rounds of the main tournament. Six teams played the first round in a single-elimination format, while Hungary entered directly to the semifinals.

Hungary won the tournament after beating Austria 3–0 in the final.

== Bracket ==
First round
Germany | 16
Russia | 0
Austria | 1
Norway | 0
Italy | 1
Sweden | 0

Semi-finals
Hungary | 3
Germany | 1
Austria | 5
Italy | 1

Final
Hungary | 3
Austria | 0

== First round ==
=== Austria vs Norway ===
July 1, 1912
First round

| Austria | 1–0 | Norway |
|---|---|---|
| Neubauer 2' | Report |

Tranebergs Idrottsplats, Traneberg
Attendance: 150
Referee: Per Sjöblom (Sweden)

Austria
Norway

| GK | Josef Kaltenbrunner |
| DF | Ladislaus Kurpiel |
| DF | Karl Braunsteiner |
| DF | Franz Weber (capt.) |
| DF | Josef Brandstätter |
| MF | Robert Cimera |
| MF | Alois Müller |
| MF | Gustav Blaha |
| FW | Robert Merz |
| FW | Leopold Grundwald |
| FW | Leopold Neubauer |
Manager:
(Austria) ÖFB Committee

| GK | Ingolf Pedersen |
| RB | Per Skou |
| LB | Einar Friis Baastad |
| RH | Harald Johansen |
| CH | Charles Herlofson (capt.) |
| LH | Sverre Jensen |
| OR | Henry Reinholdt |
| IR | Kristian Krefting |
| CF | Hans Endrerud |
| IL | Rolf Maartmann |
| OL | Erling Maartmann |
Manager:
(England) James Vincent Hayes

=== Germany vs Russia ===
July 1, 1912
First round

| Germany | 16–0 | Russia |
|---|---|---|
| Fuchs 2', 9', 21', 28', 34', 46', 51', 55', 65', 69'; Förderer 6', 27', 53', 66'; Burger 30'; Oberle 58' | Report |

Råsunda IP, Solna
Attendance: 2,000
Referee: Christiaan Groothoff (Netherlands)

Germany
Russia

| GK | Adolf Werner |
| DF | Hans Reese |
| DF | Walter Hempel |
| MF | Karl Burger |
| MF | Josef Glaser |
| MF | Camillo Ugi (capt.) |
| FW | Karl Uhle |
| FW | Fritz Förderer |
| FW | Gottfried Fuchs |
| FW | Emil Oberle |
| FW | Otto Thiel |
Manager:
(Germany) DFB Committee

| GK | Lev Favorsky |
| DF | Pyotr Sokolov |
| DF | Fyodor Rimsha |
| MF | Aleksei Uversky |
| MF | Nikita Khromov |
| MF | Mikhail Yakovlev |
| FW | Mikhail Smirnov |
| FW | Grigori Nikitin |
| FW | Vasily Butusov (capt.) |
| FW | Vasily Zhitarev |
| FW | Sergei Filippov |
Manager:
(Russia) Robert Fulda and Georgy Dyuperron

=== Italy vs Sweden ===
July 1, 1912
First round

| Italy | 1–0 | Sweden |
|---|---|---|
| Bontadini 15' | Report |

Råsunda IP, Solna
Attendance: 2,500
Referee: Herbert Willing (Netherlands)

Italy
Sweden

| GK | Piero Campelli |
| DF | Renzo de Vecchi |
| DF | Modesto Valle |
| MF | Angelo Binaschi |
| MF | Giuseppe Milano (capt.) |
| MF | Pietro Leone |
| FW | Franco Bontadini |
| FW | Felice Berardo |
| FW | Enrico Sardi |
| FW | Luigi Barbesino |
| FW | Edoardo Mariani |
Manager:
(Italy) Vittorio Pozzo

| GK | Josef Börjesson |
| DF | Erik Bergström |
| DF | Konrad Törnqvist |
| MF | Ragnar Wicksell |
| MF | Götrik Frykman |
| MF | Karl Gustafsson |
| FW | Herman Myhrberg (capt.) |
| FW | Ivar Swensson |
| FW | Erik Börjesson |
| FW | Eric Dahlström |
| FW | Karl Ansén |
Manager:
(Sweden) John Ohlson

== Semi finals ==
=== Hungary vs Germany ===
July 3, 1912
Semifinal

| Hungary | 3–1 | Germany |
|---|---|---|
| Schlosser 3', 39', 82' | | Förderer 56' |

Råsunda IP, Solna
Attendance: 2,000
Referee: Christiaan Groothoff (Netherlands)

Hungary
Germany

| GK | László Domonkos |
| DF | Gyula Rumbold |
| DF | Imre Payer |
| MF | Antal Vágó (c) |
| MF | Kálmán Szury |
| MF | Zoltán Blum |
| FW | Béla Sebestyén |
| FW | Sándor Bodnár |
| FW | Miklós Fekete |
| FW | Imre Schlosser |
| FW | Gáspár Borbás |
Manager:
(Hungary) Ede Herczog

| GK | Adolf Werner |
| DF | Helmut Röpnack |
| DF | Ernst Hollstein |
| MF | Georg Krogmann |
| MF | Camillo Ugi (c) |
| MF | Hermann Bosch |
| FW | Karl Wegele |
| FW | Fritz Förderer |
| FW | Gottfried Fuchs |
| FW | Julius Hirsch |
| FW | Emil Oberle |
Manager:
(Germany) DFB Committee

=== Austria vs Italy ===
July 3, 1912
Semifinal

| Austria | 5–1 | Italy |
|---|---|---|
| Müller 30'; Grundwald 40', 89'; Hussak 49'; Studnicka 65' | | Berardo 81' |

Olympic Stadium, Stockholm
Attendance: 3,500
Referee: Herbert Willing (Netherlands)

Austria
Italy

| GK | Josef Kaltenbrunner |
| DF | Karl Braunsteiner |
| DF | Bernhard Graubart |
| MF | Franz Weber |
| MF | Josef Brandstätter |
| MF | Robert Cimera |
| FW | Ludwig Hussak (c) |
| FW | Alois Müller |
| FW | Johann Studnicka |
| FW | Leopold Neubauer |
| FW | Leopold Grundwald |
Manager:
(Austria) ÖFB Committee

| GK | Piero Campelli |
| DF | Renzo de Vecchi |
| DF | Modesto Valle |
| MF | Angelo Binaschi |
| MF | Giuseppe Milano (c) |
| MF | Pietro Leone |
| FW | Enea Zuffi |
| FW | Franco Bontadini |
| FW | Felice Berardo |
| FW | Luigi Barbesino |
| FW | Edoardo Mariani |
Manager:
(Italy) Vittorio Pozzo

== Final ==
1912 Consolation Tournament Final
5 July 1912
19:00

| Hungary | 3–0 | Austria |
|---|---|---|
| Schlosser 32'; Pataki 63'; Bodnar 72' | Report |

Tranebergs Idrottsplats, Stockholm
Attendance: 5,000
Referee: Herbert Willing (Netherlands)

Hungary
Austria

| GK | László Domonkos |
| DF | Gyula Rumbold |
| DF | Imre Payer |
| MF | Gyula Bíró |
| MF | Antal Vágó (capt.) |
| MF | Zoltán Blum |
| FW | Béla Sebestyén |
| FW | Sándor Bodnár |
| FW | Mihály Pataki |
| FW | Imre Schlosser |
| FW | Gáspár Borbás |
Manager:
(Hungary) Ede Herczog

| GK | Josef Kaltenbrunner |
| DF | Bernhard Graubart |
| DF | Ladislaus Kurpiel |
| MF | Josef Brandstätter |
| MF | Karl Braunsteiner |
| MF | Robert Cimera |
| FW | Ludwig Hussak (capt.) |
| FW | Alois Müller |
| FW | Robert Merz |
| FW | Leopold Neubauer |
| FW | Leopold Grundwald |
Manager:
(Austria) ÖFB Committee

== Final summary ==
| Pos | Team | Pld | W | D | L | GF | GA | GD | Pts |
|---|---|---|---|---|---|---|---|---|---|
| 1 | Hungary | 2 | 2 | 0 | 0 | 6 | 1 | +5 | 4 |
| 2 | Austria | 3 | 2 | 0 | 1 | 6 | 4 | +2 | 4 |
| 3 | Germany | 2 | 1 | 0 | 1 | 17 | 3 | +14 | 2 |
| 4 | Italy | 2 | 1 | 0 | 1 | 2 | 5 | −3 | 2 |
| 5 | Sweden | 1 | 0 | 0 | 1 | 0 | 1 | −1 | 0 |
| 6 | Norway | 1 | 0 | 0 | 1 | 0 | 1 | −1 | 0 |
| 7 | Russia | 1 | 0 | 0 | 1 | 0 | 16 | −16 | 0 |

Source: RSSSF
