= 1911–12 in Swedish football =

The 1911–12 season in Swedish football, starting January 1911 and ending July 1912:

== Honours ==
=== Official titles ===
Title	Team	Reason
1911 Swedish Champions	AIK	Winners of Svenska Mästerskapet

=== Competitions ===
Level	Competition	Team
1st level	Svenska Serien 1911–12	Örgryte IS
2nd level	Mellansvenska Serien 1911–12	Westermalms IF
2nd level	Västsvenska Serien 1912	IK Wega
Championship Cup	Svenska Mästerskapet 1911	AIK
Cup competition	Corinthian Bowl 1911	Örgryte IS
Cup competition	Kamratmästerskapen 1911	IFK Norrköping
Cup competition	Wicanderska Välgörenhetsskölden 1911	IFK Stockholm

== Promotions, relegations and qualifications ==
=== Promotions ===
Promoted from	Promoted to	Team	Reason
Unknown	Svenska Serien 1912–13	IFK Uppsala	Unknown
Unknown	Uppsvenska Serien 1912–13	Gefle IF	Unknown
Unknown	Uppsvenska Serien 1912–13	IFK Gävle	Unknown
Unknown	Uppsvenska Serien 1912–13	IF Heimdal	Unknown
Unknown	Uppsvenska Serien 1912–13	Mariebergs IK	Unknown
Unknown	Uppsvenska Serien 1912–13	Sandvikens AIK	Unknown
Unknown	Uppsvenska Serien 1912–13	IFK Stockholm	Unknown

=== Relegations ===
Relegated from	Relegated to	Team	Reason
Svenska Serien 1911–12	Uppsvenska Serien 1912–13	Mariebergs IK	Unknown
Svenska Serien 1911–12	Mellansvenska Serien 1912–13	IFK Eskilstuna	Withdrew
Svenska Serien 1911–12	Unknown	Göteborgs FF	Unknown
Svenska Serien 1911–12	Unknown	Vikingarnas FK	Withdrew
Mellansvenska Serien 1911–12	Unknown	Eriksdals IF	Withdrew
Mellansvenska Serien 1911–12	Unknown	IFK Uppsala	Withdrew
Mellansvenska Serien 1911–12	Unknown	Verdandi VoIF	Unknown
Mellansvenska Serien 1911–12	Unknown	Örebro BK	Withdrew
Västsvenska Serien 1911–12	Unknown	Jonsereds GIF	Unknown
Västsvenska Serien 1911–12	Unknown	Rantens IF	Withdrew

== Domestic results ==
=== Svenska Serien 1911–12 ===
Location of the participating clubs

Pos	Team	Pld	W	D	L	GF	GA	GR	Pts	Qualification or relegation
1	Örgryte IS (C)	11	8	1	2	29	20	1.450	17 (Note: The league was abandoned due to trouble finding days to play the remaining matches as the national team prepared for the 1912 Olympic football tournament by playing test matches, however the incomplete table is considered the final table. The following ten matches were not played: Djurgårdens IF–Mariebergs IK, Göteborgs FF–Mariebergs IK, IFK Norrköping–Djurgårdens IF, Mariebergs IK–Göteborgs FF, IFK Göteborg–Mariebergs IK, Göteborgs FF–AIK, Örgryte IS–Mariebergs IK, AIK–Göteborgs FF, Göteborgs FF–IFK Norrköping and Mariebergs IK–IFK Norrköping.)	
2	Djurgårdens IF	10	6	2	2	19	14	1.357	14	
3	IFK Göteborg	11	4	3	4	28	27	1.037	11	
4	AIK	10	4	1	5	25	23	1.087	9	
5	IFK Norrköping	9	2	2	5	15	25	0.600	6	
6	Göteborgs FF (Note: Göteborgs FF and Mariebergs IK replaced IFK Eskilstuna and Vikingarnas FK which both withdrew after only one round, their two match results are not included in the table of the other teams. Mariebergs IK then withdrew after six matches, but were allowed back in again after a while.) (R)	7	1	2	4	12	17	0.706	4	Relegation to Unknown Division
7	Marieberg (R)	6	1	1	4	9	11	0.818	3	Relegation to Uppsvenska Serien
–	Vikingarna (R)	1	1	0	0	3	1	3.000	2	Relegation to Unknown Division
–	IFK Eskilstuna (R)	1	0	0	1	0	7	0.000	0	Relegation to Mellansvenska Serien

Rules for classification: 1) points; 2) goal ratio.
(C) Champions; (R) Relegated

=== Mellansvenska Serien 1911–12 ===

	Team	Pld	W	D	L	GF		GA	GD	Pts
1	Westermalms IF	7	7	0	0	29	–	11	+18	14
2	IF Svea	8	4	0	4	18	–	19	-1	8
3	Verdandi VoIF	8	3	2	3	15	–	15	0	8
4	Johanneshofs IF	5	3	1	1	14	–	9	+5	7
5	Köpings IS	9	1	3	5	11	–	21	-10	5
6	IFK Västerås	9	1	2	6	16	–	28	-12	4
–	Eriksdals IF	4	2	1	1	9	–	7	+2	5
–	IFK Uppsala	0	0	0	0	0	–	0	0	0
–	Örebro BK	0	0	0	0	0	–	0	0	0

=== Västsvenska Serien 1912 ===
	Team	Pld	W	D	L	GF		GA	GD	Pts
1	IK Wega	6	4	1	1	16	–	8	+8	9
2	GAIS	6	3	2	1	18	–	9	+9	8
3	Jonsereds GIF	3	1	1	1	5	–	5	0	3
4	IF Elfsborg	4	1	0	3	8	–	15	-7	2
5	IFK Uddevalla	5	1	0	4	4	–	14	-10	2
–	Rantens IF	0	0	0	0	0	–	0	0	0

=== Svenska Mästerskapet 1911 ===
Final

October 8, 1911

AIK	3–2	IFK Uppsala

Råsunda IP, Solna

=== Corinthian Bowl 1911 ===
Final

May 28, 1911

Örgryte IS	5–2	Djurgårdens IF

Walhalla IP, Gothenburg

=== Kamratmästerskapen 1911 ===
Final

October 15, 1911

IFK Norrköping	1–0	IFK Stockholm

Råsunda IP, Solna

=== Wicanderska Välgörenhetsskölden 1911 ===
Final

November 5, 1911

IFK Stockholm	3–2	Westermalms IF

Råsunda IP, Solna

== National team results ==
June 18, 1911
Friendly
№ 9

Sweden	2–4	Germany
Gustafsson 28', 29'		Dumke 13', 44', 83'; Kipp 54'

Råsunda IP, Solna
Attendance: 3,000
Referee: Buchwald (Denmark)

Sweden: Oskar Bengtsson - Knut Sandlund, Jacob Levin - Ragnar Wicksell, Götrik Frykman, Sixten Öberg - Herman Myhrberg, Gustaf Ekberg, Karl Gustafsson, Josef Appelgren, Karl Ansén.

September 17, 1911
Friendly
№ 10

Sweden	4–1	Norway
Ekroth 8', 35'; Börjesson 15'; Dahlström 47'		Maartmann 60'

Råsunda IP, Solna
Attendance: 3,000
Referee: Middelboe (Denmark)

Sweden: Knut Gustavsson - Theodor Malm, Erik Lavass - Axel Lyberg, Götrik Frykman, Fritz Welander - Ivar Friberg, William Dahlström, Erik Börjesson, Helge Ekroth, Karl Ansén.

October 22, 1911
Friendly
№ 11

Finland	2–5	Sweden
Lindbäck 3'; Jerima-Jefimoff 5'		Ericsson 40'; Persson 46'; Brolin 65', 86'; Andersson 88'

Eläintarha Stadium, Helsinki
Attendance: 2,000
Referee: Eerikäinen (Finland)

Sweden: Gerhard Pettersson - Johannes Hellgren, Sven Pettersson - Sven Svensson, Hans Lindman, Erik Bohlin - Gunnar Pleijel, Karl Persson, Ludvig Ericsson, Adrian Brolin, Rudolf Andersson.

October 29, 1911
Friendly
№ 12

Germany	1–3	Sweden
Möller 81'		Börjesson 15', 35'; Olsson 60'

Victoria-Stadion, Hamburg
Attendance: 6,000
Referee: Willing (Netherlands)

Sweden: Josef Börjesson - Theodor Malm, Jacob Levin - Ragnar Wicksell, Knut Nilsson, John Olsson - Herman Myhrberg, Josef Appelgren, Erik Börjesson, Helge Ekroth, Karl Ansén.

June 16, 1912
Friendly
№ 13

Norway	1–2	Sweden
Maartmann 22'		Ekroth 37', 75'

Gamle Frogner, Kristiania
Attendance: 7,000
Referee: Middelboe (Denmark)

Sweden: Erik Bergqvist - Konrad Törnqvist, Henning Svensson - Ragnar Wicksell, Gustav Sandberg, Karl Gustafsson - Herman Myhrberg, Einar Halling-Johansson, Arvid Fagrell, Helge Ekroth, Karl Ansén.

June 20, 1912
Friendly
№ 14

Sweden	2–2	Hungary
Bergström 8'; Swensson 46'		Bodnár 38'; Schlosser 67'

Walhalla IP, Gothenburg
Attendance: 2,500
Referee: Meerum-Terwogt (Netherlands)

Sweden: Josef Börjesson - Theodor Malm, Jacob Levin - Ragnar Wicksell, Gustav Sandberg, Karl Gustafsson - Herman Myhrberg, Einar Halling-Johansson, Erik Börjesson, Iwar Swensson, Erik Bergström.

June 27, 1912
Friendly
№ 15

Sweden	7–1	Finland
Lorichs 1', 50', 65'; Dahlström 52', 87'; Persson 80', 88'		Wiberg 38'

Råsunda IP, Solna
Attendance: 3,000
Referee: Meisl (Austria)

Sweden: Herbert Svensson - Theodor Malm, Konrad Törnqvist - Gustaf Ekberg, Knut Nilsson, Oscar Gustafsson - Axel Bohm, Karl Persson, Eric Dahlström, Hjalmar Lorichs, Birger Carlsson.

June 29, 1912
1912 Olympics prel. round (1/8 final)
№ 16

Sweden	3–4 (aet)	Netherlands
Swensson 3', 80'; Börjesson 62' (p)		Bouvy 28', 52'; Vos 43', 91' (et)

Stockholms Stadion, Stockholm
Attendance: 14,000
Referee: Wagstaffe-Simmons (England)

Sweden: Josef Börjesson - Jacob Levin, Erik Bergström - Ragnar Wicksell, Gustav Sandberg, Karl Gustafsson - Herman Myhrberg, Iwar Swensson, Erik Börjesson, Helge Ekroth, Karl Ansén.

July 1, 1912
1912 Olympics consol. 1st round (1/4 final)
№ 17

Sweden	0–1	Italy
		Bontadini 15'

Råsunda IP, Solna
Attendance: 2,500
Referee: Willing (Netherlands)

Sweden: Josef Börjesson - Erik Bergström, Konrad Törnqvist - Ragnar Wicksell, Götrik Frykman, Karl Gustafsson - Herman Myhrberg, Iwar Swensson, Erik Börjesson, Eric Dahlström, Karl Ansén.

== National team players in season 1911/12 ==
name	pos.	caps	goals	club
Rudolf Andersson	FW	1	1	IFK Uppsala
Karl Ansén	FW	6	0	AIK
Josef "Päron" Appelgren	FW	2	0	Örgryte IS
Oskar "Påsket" Bengtsson	GK	1	0	Örgryte IS
Erik "Berka" Bergqvist	GK	1	0	IFK Stockholm
Erik "Backen" Bergström	FW/DF	3	1	Örgryte IS
Erik Bohlin	MF	1	0	IFK Uppsala
Axel Bohm	FW	1	0	IF Verdandi
Erik "Börje" Börjesson	FW	5	4	Örgryte IS (2); Jonsereds GIF (3)
Josef Börjesson	GK	4	0	Göteborgs FF
Adrian Brolin	FW	1	2	IFK Uppsala
Birger Carlsson	FW	1	0	Westermalms IF
Eric Dahlström	FW	2	2	IFK Eskilstuna
William "Kata" Dahlström	FW	1	1	IFK Stockholm
Gustaf "Blekberg" Ekberg	FW/MF	2	0	Johanneshofs IF
Helge "Ekis" Ekroth	FW	4	4	AIK
Ludvig Ericsson	FW	1	1	IFK Uppsala
Arvid Fagrell	FW	1	0	IFK Göteborg
Ivar Friberg	FW	1	0	Djurgårdens IF
Götrik "Putte" Frykman	MF	3	0	Djurgårdens IF
Karl "Köping" Gustafsson	FW/MF	5	2	Köpings IS
Oscar Gustafsson	MF	1	0	Johanneshofs IF
Knut Gustavsson	GK	1	0	Mariebergs IK
Einar Halling-Johansson	FW	2	0	Örgryte IS
Johannes "Janne" Hellgren	DF	1	0	IFK Uppsala
Erik Lavass	DF	1	0	Djurgårdens IF
Jacob Levin	DF	4	0	Örgryte IS
Hans Lindman	MF	1	0	IFK Uppsala
Hjalmar Lorichs	FW	1	3	Köpings IS
Axel "Nyggen" Lyberg	MF	1	0	IFK Stockholm
Theodor "Todde" Malm	DF	4	0	AIK
Herman Myhrberg	FW	6	0	Örgryte IS
Knut "Knutte" Nilsson	MF	2	0	AIK
Sixten Öberg	MF	1	0	Mariebergs IK
John Olsson	MF	1	1	Örgryte IS
Karl Persson	FW	2	3	IFK Uppsala (1); Sandvikens AIK (1)
Gerhard Pettersson	GK	1	0	IFK Uppsala
Sven Pettersson	DF	1	0	IFK Gävle
Gunnar Pleijel	FW	1	0	IFK Uppsala
Gustav (Gustaf) "Skädda" Sandberg	MF	3	0	Örgryte IS
Knut Sandlund	DF	1	0	Djurgårdens IF
Henning Svensson	DF	1	0	IFK Göteborg
Herbert Svensson	GK	1	0	Mariebergs IK
Sven Svensson	MF	1	0	IFK Uppsala
Iwar "Iffa-Sven" Swensson	FW	3	3	IFK Norrköping
Konrad Törnqvist	DF	3	0	IFK Göteborg
Fritz "Fritte" Welander	MF	1	0	AIK
Ragnar "Ragge" Wicksell	MF	6	0	Djurgårdens IF
