= 1912–13 in Swedish football =

The 1912-13 season in Swedish football, starting August 1912 and ending July 1913:

== Honours ==
=== Official titles ===
Title	Team	Reason
1912 Swedish Champions	Djurgårdens IF	Winners of Svenska Mästerskapet

=== Competitions ===
Level	Competition	Team
1st level	Svenska Serien 1912–13	IFK Göteborg
2nd level	Uppsvenska Serien 1913	Sandvikens AIK
2nd level	Mellansvenska Serien 1913	IFK Västerås
2nd level	Västsvenska Serien 1913	GAIS
Championship Cup	Svenska Mästerskapet 1912	Djurgårdens IF
Cup competition	Corinthian Bowl 1912	Örgryte IS
Cup competition	Kamratmästerskapen 1912	IFK Göteborg
Cup competition	Wicanderska Välgörenhetsskölden 1912	IFK Stockholm

== Promotions, relegations and qualifications ==
=== Promotions ===
Promoted from	Promoted to	Team	Reason
Unknown	Mellansvenskan 1913–14	IK Sleipner	Unknown
Unknown	Centralserien 1913	AIK	Unknown
Unknown	Centralserien 1913	Djurgårdens IF	Unknown
Unknown	Centralserien 1913	Johanneshofs IF	Unknown
Unknown	Centralserien 1913	Mariebergs IF	Unknown
Unknown	Centralserien 1913	IFK Stockholm	Unknown
Unknown	Centralserien 1913	Westermalms IF	Unknown

=== Relegations ===
Relegated from	Relegated to	Team	Reason
Västsvenska Serien 1913	Unknown	GAIS	No Västsvenska Serien next season
Västsvenska Serien 1913	Unknown	IK Wega	No Västsvenska Serien next season
Västsvenska Serien 1913	Unknown	IF Elfsborg	No Västsvenska Serien next season
Västsvenska Serien 1913	Unknown	IFK Uddevalla	No Västsvenska Serien next season
Västsvenska Serien 1913	Unknown	Vänersborgs IF	Withdrew

== Domestic results ==
=== Svenska Serien 1912–13 ===

	Team	Pld	W	D	L	GF		GA	GD	Pts
1	IFK Göteborg	10	7	2	1	25	–	9	+16	16
2	Örgryte IS	10	6	1	3	36	–	14	+22	13
3	AIK	10	6	0	4	23	–	27	-4	12
4	Djurgårdens IF	10	5	0	5	19	–	25	-6	10
5	IFK Uppsala	10	3	1	6	22	–	23	-1	7
6	IFK Norrköping	10	0	2	8	7	–	34	-27	2

=== Uppsvenska Serien 1913 ===

	Team	Pld	W	D	L	GF		GA	GD	Pts
1	Sandvikens AIK	10	7	1	2	28	–	11	+17	15
2	IFK Gävle	10	6	2	2	21	–	16	+5	14
3	Mariebergs IK	10	3	4	3	17	–	17	0	10
4	IF Heimdal	10	5	0	5	24	–	28	-4	10
5	IFK Stockholm	10	3	2	5	17	–	18	-1	8
6	Gefle IF	10	1	1	8	15	–	32	-17	3

=== Mellansvenska Serien 1913 ===
	Team	Pld	W	D	L	GF		GA	GD	Pts
1	IFK Västerås	10	7	3	0	21	–	5	+16	17
2	Westermalms IF	10	7	3	0	38	–	16	+22	17
3	IFK Eskilstuna	10	4	2	4	19	–	22	-3	10
4	Johanneshofs IF	10	4	0	6	19	–	30	-11	8
5	IF Svea	10	3	0	7	19	–	26	-7	6
6	Köpings IS	10	1	0	9	14	–	31	-17	2

=== Västsvenska Serien 1913 ===
	Team	Pld	W	D	L	GF		GA	GD	Pts
1	GAIS	5	5	0	0	22	–	6	+16	10
2	IK Wega	6	4	0	2	17	–	12	+5	8
3	IF Elfsborg	6	1	1	4	13	–	28	-15	3
4	IFK Uddevalla	5	0	1	4	4	–	10	-6	1
–	Vänersborgs IF	4	1	0	3	6	–	32	-28	2

=== Svenska Mästerskapet 1912 ===
Final

October 13, 1912

Djurgårdens IF	0–0	Örgryte IS

Stockholms Stadion, Stockholm
November 10, 1912

Djurgårdens IF	2–2	Örgryte IS

Walhalla IP, Gothenburg
November 17, 1912

Djurgårdens IF	3–1	Örgryte IS

Råsunda IP, Solna

=== Corinthian Bowl 1912 ===
Final

September 15, 1912

Örgryte IS	4–2	AIK

Walhalla IP, Gothenburg

=== Kamratmästerskapen 1912 ===
Final

November 17, 1912

IFK Göteborg	4–2	IFK Stockholm

Walhalla IP, Gothenburg

=== Wicanderska Välgörenhetsskölden 1912 ===
Final

October 27, 1912

IFK Stockholm	1–0	Mariebergs IK

Stockholms Stadion, Stockholm

== National team results ==
November 3, 1912
Friendly
№ 18

Sweden	4–2	Norway
Frykman 10'; Swensson 18', 37'; Ekroth 70' (p)		Ditlev-Simonsen 21', 55'

Walhalla IP, Gothenburg
Attendance: 3,000
Referee: Buchwald (Denmark)

Sweden: Oskar Bengtsson - Jacob Levin, Konrad Törnqvist - Sigurd Petersén, Götrik Frykman, Karl Gustafsson - Harry Hellberg, Carl Ohlsson, Iwar Swensson, Helge Ekroth, Herman Myhrberg.

May 4, 1913
Friendly
№ 19

Russia	1–4	Sweden
Zhitarev 1'		Howander 36', (?)'; Gustafsson (?)'; Swensson (?)'

Sokolniki Stadium, Moscow
Attendance: 8,000
Referee: Schultz (Russia)

Sweden: Knut Gustavsson - Theodor Malm, Konrad Törnqvist - Fridolf Pettersson, Knut Nilsson, Sigurd Petersén - Harry Hellberg, Iwar Swensson, Seth Howander, Karl Gustafsson, Karl Ansén.

May 18, 1913
Friendly
№ 20

Hungary	2–0	Sweden
Pataki 85'; Schlosser 87'

Stadion Üllői Út, Budapest
Attendance: 30,000
Referee: Retschury (Austria)

Sweden: Knut Gustavsson - Oskar Berg, Konrad Törnqvist - Ragnar Wicksell, Karl Gustafsson, Sigurd Petersén - Georg Bengtsson, Otto Malm, Seth Howander, Iwar Swensson, Victor Jansson.

May 25, 1913
Friendly
№ 21

Denmark	8–0	Sweden
Gyldenstein 12', 56', 61'; Olsen 20', 44'; Wolfhagen 39'; Nielsen 53'; Middelboe 57'

Idrætsparken, Copenhagen
Attendance: 8,000
Referee: Meerum-Terwogt (Netherlands)

Sweden: Knut Gustavsson - Erik Bergström, Konrad Törnqvist - Sigurd Petersén, Gustav Sandberg, Karl Gustafsson - Herman Myhrberg, Iwar Swensson, Erik Börjesson, Josef Appelgren, Karl Ansén.

June 8, 1913
Friendly
№ 22

Sweden	9–0	Norway
Swensson 4', 65'; Bergström 9'; Gustafsson 23', 36', 50', 52', 75'; Ekroth 86'

Stockholms Stadion, Stockholm
Attendance: 10,000
Referee: Gelbord (Sweden)

Sweden: Knut Gustavsson - Theodor Malm, Erik Runeborg - Ragnar Wicksell, Gustaf Ekberg, Sigurd Petersén - Rune Bergström, Iwar Swensson, Karl Gustafsson, Helge Ekroth, Karl Ansén.

== National team players in season 1912/13 ==
name	pos.	caps	goals	club
Karl Ansén	FW	3	0	AIK
Josef "Päron" Appelgren	FW	1	0	Örgryte IS
Georg "Joije" Bengtsson	FW	1	0	Hälsingborgs IF
Oskar "Påsket" Bengtsson	GK	1	0	Örgryte IS
Oskar Berg	DF	1	0	IFK Västerås
Erik "Backen" Bergström	DF	1	0	Örgryte IS
Rune Bergström	FW	1	1	Westermalms IF
Erik "Börje" Börjesson	FW	1	0	IFK Göteborg
Gustaf "Blekberg" Ekberg	MF	1	0	Johanneshofs IF
Helge "Ekis" Ekroth	FW	2	2	AIK
Götrik "Putte" Frykman	MF	1	1	Djurgårdens IF
Karl "Köping" Gustafsson	FW/MF	5	6	Köpings IS
Knut Gustavsson	GK	4	0	Mariebergs IK
Harry Hellberg	FW	2	0	IFK Göteborg
Seth "Settan" Howander	FW	2	2	IFK Uppsala
Victor "Vicke" Jansson	FW	1	0	Djurgårdens IF
Jacob Levin	DF	1	0	Örgryte IS
Otto "Petter" Malm	FW	1	0	Hälsingborgs IF
Theodor "Todde" Malm	DF	2	0	AIK
Herman Myhrberg	FW	2	0	Örgryte IS
Knut "Knutte" Nilsson	MF	1	0	AIK
Carl "Kalle Kill" Ohlsson	FW	1	0	IFK Göteborg
Sigurd Petersén	MF	5	0	IFK Stockholm
Fridolf Pettersson	MF	1	0	Örgryte IS
Erik Runeborg	DF	1	0	AIK
Gustav "Skädda" Sandberg	MF	1	0	Örgryte IS
Iwar "Iffa-Sven" Swensson	FW	5	5	IFK Norrköping
Konrad Törnqvist	DF	4	0	IFK Göteborg
Ragnar "Ragge" Wicksell	MF	2	0	Djurgårdens IF
