= 1913–14 in Swedish football =

The 1913-14 season in Swedish football, starting August 1913 and ending July 1914:

== Honours ==
=== Official titles ===
Title	Team	Reason
1913 Swedish Champions	Örgryte IS	Winners of Svenska Mästerskapet

=== Competitions ===
Level	Competition	Team
1st level	Svenska Serien 1913–14	IFK Göteborg
2nd level	Uppsvenska Serien 1913–14	Mariebergs IK
2nd level	Mellansvenska Serien 1913–14	Köpings IS
Regional level	Centralserien 1913	IFK Stockholm
Championship Cup	Svenska Mästerskapet 1913	Örgryte IS
Cup competition	Corinthian Bowl 1913	Örgryte IS
Cup competition	Kamratmästerskapen 1913	IFK Göteborg
Cup competition	Wicanderska Välgörenhetsskölden 1913	Djurgårdens IF

== Promotions, relegations and qualifications ==
=== Promotions ===
Promoted from	Promoted to	Team	Reason
Unknown	Östsvenska Serien 1915	IK City	Unknown
Unknown	Östsvenska Serien 1915	Enköpings AIF	Unknown
Unknown	Östsvenska Serien 1915	Klara SK	Unknown
Unknown	Östsvenska Serien 1915	IF Linnéa	Unknown
Unknown	Östsvenska Serien 1915	IF Swithiod	Unknown
Unknown	Östsvenska Serien 1915	Södermalms IK	Unknown
Unknown	Östsvenska Serien 1915	IF Verdandi	Unknown
Unknown	Östsvenska Serien 1915	Västerås SK	Unknown
Unknown	Västsvenska Serien 1914–15	GAIS	Unknown
Unknown	Västsvenska Serien 1914–15	IS Halmia	Unknown
Unknown	Västsvenska Serien 1914–15	IF Elfsborg	Unknown
Unknown	Västsvenska Serien 1914–15	Surte IS	Unknown
Unknown	Västsvenska Serien 1914–15	IFK Uddevalla	Unknown
Unknown	Västsvenska Serien 1914–15	IK Wega	Unknown

=== League transfers ===
Transferred from	Transferred to	Team	Reason
Uppsvenska Serien 1913–14	Mellansvenska Serien 1914–15	IFK Stockholm	Unknown

=== Relegations ===
Relegated from	Relegated to	Team	Reason
Svenska Serien 1913–14	Mellansvenska Serien 1914–15	IFK Uppsala	Unknown
Uppsvenska Serien 1913–14	Unknown	IF Heimdal	Unknown
Mellansvenska Serien 1913–14	Unknown	IF Svea	Withdrew
Centralserien 1913–14	Unknown	AIK	No Centralserien next season
Centralserien 1913–14	Unknown	Djurgårdens IF	No Centralserien next season
Centralserien 1913–14	Unknown	Johanneshofs IF	No Centralserien next season
Centralserien 1913–14	Unknown	Mariebergs IK	No Centralserien next season
Centralserien 1913–14	Unknown	IFK Stockholm	No Centralserien next season
Centralserien 1913–14	Unknown	Westermalms IF	No Centralserien next season

== Domestic results ==
=== Svenska Serien 1913–14 ===

	Team	Pld	W	D	L	GF		GA	GD	Pts
1	IFK Göteborg	10	8	1	1	37	–	11	+26	17
2	Örgryte IS	10	7	1	2	23	–	9	+14	15
3	Djurgårdens IF	10	3	4	3	16	–	17	-1	10
4	AIK	10	4	1	5	17	–	27	-10	9
5	IFK Norrköping	10	2	1	7	19	–	34	-15	5
6	IFK Uppsala	10	1	2	7	14	–	28	-14	4

=== Uppsvenska Serien 1913–14 ===

	Team	Pld	W	D	L	GF		GA	GD	Pts
1	Mariebergs IK	10	6	3	1	24	–	8	+16	15
2	IFK Stockholm	10	5	2	3	30	–	21	+9	12
3	Sandvikens AIK	10	5	2	3	20	–	15	+5	12
4	Gefle IF	10	5	1	4	20	–	19	+1	11
5	IFK Gävle	10	1	3	6	17	–	33	-16	5
6	IF Heimdal	10	2	1	7	12	–	27	-15	5

=== Mellansvenska Serien 1913–14 ===
	Team	Pld	W	D	L	GF		GA	GD	Pts
1	Köpings IS	10	7	1	2	22	–	14	+8	15
2	IFK Eskilstuna	10	5	1	4	19	–	15	+4	11
3	Johanneshofs IF	10	5	0	5	23	–	26	-3	10
4	IFK Västerås	10	3	3	4	20	–	15	+5	9
5	Westermalms IF	10	3	3	4	26	–	28	-2	9
6	IK Sleipner	10	2	2	6	11	–	23	-12	6
–	IF Svea	9	0	0	9	2	–	73	-71	0

=== Centralserien 1913 ===
	Team	Pld	W	D	L	GF		GA	GD	Pts
1	IFK Stockholm	10	7	0	3	24	–	15	+9	14
2	Djurgårdens IF	10	6	1	3	33	–	17	+16	13
3	Westermalms IF	10	3	4	3	13	–	14	-1	10
4	Johanneshofs IF	10	4	2	4	16	–	30	-14	10
5	AIK	10	3	1	6	17	–	18	-1	7
6	Mariebergs IK	10	2	2	6	14	–	24	-10	6

=== Svenska Mästerskapet 1913 ===
Final

November 2, 1913

Örgryte IS	3–2	Djurgårdens IF

Walhalla IP, Gothenburg

=== Corinthian Bowl 1913 ===
Final

June 29, 1913

AIK	1–1	Örgryte IS

Råsunda IP, Stockholm
July 13, 1913

Örgryte IS	5–1	AIK

Walhalla IP, Gothenburg

=== Kamratmästerskapen 1913 ===
Final

October 19, 1913

IFK Göteborg	4–0	IFK Stockholm

Walhalla IP, Gothenburg

Extra final

June 7, 1914

IFK Göteborg	3–0	IFK Stockholm

Råsunda IP, Solna

=== Wicanderska Välgörenhetsskölden 1913 ===
Final

May 1, 1913

Djurgårdens IF	2–1	Westermalms IF

Tranebergs IP, Stockholm

== National team results ==
October 5, 1913
Friendly
№ 23

Sweden	0–10	Denmark
		Nielsen 5', 10', 29', 47', 50', 53'; Knudsen 40', 70'; Wolfhagen 63', 85'

Stockholms Stadion, Stockholm
Attendance: 8,000
Referee: Miller (England)

Sweden: Oskar Bengtsson - Theodor Malm, Konrad Törnqvist - Gustaf Ekberg, Knut Nilsson, Claes Berg - Albert Kristiansson, Iwar Swensson, Karl Gustafsson, Sten Söderberg, Bror Hagard.

October 26, 1913
Friendly
№ 24

Norway	1–1	Sweden
Skou 60' (p)		Ohlsson 80'

Gamle Frogner, Kristiania
Attendance: 10,000
Referee: Buchwald (Denmark)

Sweden: John Karlsson-Nottorp - Henning Svensson, Konrad Törnqvist - Gustaf Magnusson, Theodor Andersson, Knut Holmgren - John Karlsson, Carl Ohlsson, Erik Börjesson, Erik Hjelm, Arthur Lundin.

May 24, 1914
Friendly
№ 25

Sweden	4–3	Finland
Bergström 22'; Swensson 59', 82'; Gunnarsson 85'		Schybergson 35', 62'; Johansson 48'

Råsunda IP, Solna
Attendance: 2,000
Referee: Heilberg-Kahrs (Norway)

Sweden: Karl Runn - Theodor Malm, Gösta Backlund - Ragnar Wicksell, Karl Gustafsson, David Spångberg - Rune Bergström, Walfrid Gunnarsson, Iwar Swensson, Sten Söderberg, Birger Carlsson.

June 10, 1914
Friendly
№ 26

Sweden	1–5	England (am.)
Börjesson 89'		Moore 5', 80'; Woodward 38'; Sharpe 62' (p); Prince 85'

Råsunda IP, Solna
Attendance: 5,000
Referee: Tromp (Netherlands)

Sweden: John Karlsson-Nottorp - Theodor Malm, Henning Svensson - Ragnar Wicksell, Knut Nilsson, Gustaf Ekberg - Rune Bergström, Iwar Swensson, Erik Börjesson, Erik Hjelm, Birger Carlsson.

June 21, 1914
Friendly
№ 27

Sweden	1–1	Hungary
Börjesson 50'		Schlosser 30'

Råsunda IP, Solna
Attendance: 5,000
Referee: Meerum-Terwogt (Netherlands)

Sweden: John Karlsson-Nottorp - Theodor Malm, Erik Runeborg - Ragnar Wicksell, Knut Nilsson, Gustaf Ekberg - Rune Bergström, Iwar Swensson, Erik Börjesson, Erik Hjelm, Arthur Lundin.

June 28, 1914
Friendly
№ 28

Norway	0–1	Sweden
		Hjelm 60'

Frogner Stadion, Kristiania
Attendance: 8,000
Referee: Vestergaard (Denmark)

Sweden: John Karlsson-Nottorp - Theodor Malm, Erik Runeborg - Ragnar Wicksell, Knut Nilsson, Knut Holmgren - Rune Bergström, Gustaf Ekberg, Iwar Swensson, Erik Hjelm, Arthur Lundin.

July 5, 1914
Friendly
№ 29

Sweden	2–2	Russia
Wicksell 70'; Swensson 87'		Zhitarev 62', 71'

Råsunda IP, Solna
Attendance: 1,200
Referee: Bolin (Sweden)

Sweden: David Hulterström - Theodor Malm, Gösta Backlund - Ragnar Wicksell, Knut Nilsson, Gustaf Ekberg - Rune Bergström, Iwar Swensson, Karl Gustafsson, Sten Söderberg, Carl Karlstrand.

== National team players in season 1913/14 ==
name	pos.	caps	goals	club
Theodor Andersson	MF	1	0	IFK Göteborg
Gösta Backlund	DF	2	0	Djurgårdens IF
Oskar "Påsket" Bengtsson	GK	1	0	Örgryte IS
Claes "Klasse" Berg	MF	1	0	AIK
Rune Bergström	FW	5	1	Westermalms IF
Erik "Börje" Börjesson	FW	3	2	IFK Göteborg
Birger Carlsson	FW	2	0	Westermalms IF
Gustaf "Blekberg" Ekberg	MF	5	0	Johanneshofs IF
Walfrid (Valfrid) "Valle" Gunnarsson	FW	1	1	AIK
Karl "Köping" Gustafsson	FW/MF	3	0	Köpings IS
Bror Hagard	FW	1	0	Örgryte IS
Erik Hjelm	FW	4	1	IFK Göteborg
Knut Holmgren	MF	2	0	IFK Göteborg
David Hulterström	GK	1	0	AIK
John Karlsson	FW	1	0	IFK Göteborg
John "Stjärna" Karlsson-Nottorp	GK	4	0	IFK Göteborg
Carl Karlstrand	FW	1	0	Djurgårdens IF
Albert "Vovven" Kristiansson	FW	1	0	Örgryte IS
Arthur "Japan" Lundin	FW	3	0	IFK Göteborg
Gustaf Magnusson	MF	1	0	IFK Göteborg
Theodor "Todde" Malm	DF	6	0	AIK
Knut "Knutte" Nilsson	MF	5	0	AIK
Carl "Kalle Kill" Ohlsson	FW	1	1	IFK Göteborg
Erik Runeborg	DF	2	0	AIK
Karl Runn	GK	1	0	Djurgårdens IF
Sten "Knata" Söderberg	FW	3	0	Djurgårdens IF
David "Spånga" Spångberg	MF	1	0	AIK
Henning Svensson	DF	2	0	IFK Göteborg
Iwar "Iffa-Sven" Swensson	FW	6	3	IFK Norrköping (1); AIK (5)
Konrad Törnqvist	DF	2	0	IFK Göteborg
Ragnar "Ragge" Wicksell	MF	5	1	Djurgårdens IF
