= 1914–15 in Swedish football =

The 1914-15 season in Swedish football, starting August 1914 and ending July 1915:

== Honours ==
=== Official titles ===
Title	Team	Reason
1914 Swedish Champions	AIK	Winners of Svenska Mästerskapet

=== Competitions ===
Level	Competition	Team
1st level	1914–15 Svenska Serien	IFK Göteborg
2nd level	Uppsvenska Serien 1915	Mariebergs IK
2nd level	Mellansvenska Serien 1914–15	Johanneshofs IF
2nd level	Östsvenska Serien 1915	Hammarby IF
2nd level	Västsvenska Serien 1914–15	GAIS
Championship Cup	Svenska Mästerskapet 1914	AIK
Cup competition	Kamratmästerskapen 1914	IFK Göteborg
Cup competition	Wicanderska Välgörenhetsskölden 1914	AIK

== Promotions, relegations and qualifications ==
=== Promotions ===
Promoted from	Promoted to	Team	Reason
Västsvenska Serien 1914–15	Svenska Serien 1915–16	GAIS	Unknown
Unknown	Uppsvenska Serien 1915–16	Falu IK	Unknown
Unknown	Uppsvenska Serien 1915–16	IK Sirius	Unknown

=== League transfers ===
Transferred from	Transferred to	Team	Reason
Östsvenska Serien 1915	Uppsvenska Serien 1915–16	Hammarby IF	Unknown
Uppsvenska Serien 1915	Mellansvenska Serien 1915–16	Mariebergs IK	Unknown

=== Relegations ===
Relegated from	Relegated to	Team	Reason
Mellansvenska Serien 1914–15	Unknown	Johanneshofs IF	Unknown
Mellansvenska Serien 1914–15	Unknown	IFK Stockholm	Unknown
Mellansvenska Serien 1914–15	Unknown	Westermalms IF	Unknown
Östsvenska Serien 1915	Unknown	IF Linnéa	Unknown
Västsvenska Serien 1914–15	Unknown	IS Halmia	Withdrew

== Domestic results ==
=== Svenska Serien 1914–15 ===

	Team	Pld	W	D	L	GF		GA	GD	Pts
1	IFK Göteborg	8	6	0	2	25	–	13	+12	12
2	AIK	8	5	0	3	30	–	15	+15	10
3	Örgryte IS	8	5	0	3	22	–	18	+4	10
4	Djurgårdens IF	8	3	1	4	17	–	26	-9	7
5	IFK Norrköping	8	0	1	7	7	–	37	-30	1

=== Uppsvenska Serien 1915 ===

	Team	Pld	W	D	L	GF		GA	GD	Pts
1	Mariebergs IK	6	5	0	1	17	–	3	+14	10
2	Sandvikens AIK	6	5	0	1	16	–	6	+10	10
3	IFK Gävle	6	1	1	4	9	–	19	-10	3
4	Gefle IF	6	0	1	5	3	–	17	-14	1

=== Mellansvenska Serien 1914–15 ===
	Team	Pld	W	D	L	GF		GA	GD	Pts
1	Johanneshofs IF	14	7	4	3	31	–	18	+13	18
2	IFK Eskilstuna	14	5	7	2	21	–	14	+7	17
3	IK Sleipner	14	6	5	3	25	–	18	+7	17
4	IFK Uppsala	14	6	5	3	36	–	29	+7	17
5	IFK Stockholm	14	5	4	5	25	–	24	+1	14
6	Köpings IS	14	4	3	7	16	–	26	-10	11
7	IFK Västerås	14	3	3	8	19	–	32	-13	9
8	Westermalms IF	14	3	3	8	15	–	27	-12	9

=== Östsvenska Serien 1915 ===
	Team	Pld	W	D	L	GF		GA	GD	Pts
1	Hammarby IF	14	12	1	1	45	–	9	+36	25
2	IK City	14	8	1	5	32	–	20	+12	17
3	Södermalms IK	14	7	2	5	24	–	13	+11	16
4	IF Swithiod	14	7	1	6	32	–	28	+4	15
5	IF Linnéa	14	7	1	6	32	–	30	+2	15
6	Enköpings AIF	14	4	2	8	20	–	49	-29	10
7	IF Verdandi	14	4	1	9	18	–	25	-7	9
8	Västerås SK	14	1	3	10	17	–	46	-29	5

=== Västsvenska Serien 1914–15 ===
	Team	Pld	W	D	L	GF		GA	GD	Pts
1	GAIS	6	5	1	0	17	–	5	+12	11
2	IF Elfsborg	7	4	1	2	20	–	11	+9	9
3	IK Wega	7	3	2	2	12	–	8	+4	8
4	Surte IS	7	1	1	5	13	–	26	-13	3
5	IFK Uddevalla	7	0	3	4	9	–	21	-12	3
–	IS Halmia	4	2	1	1	13	–	7	+6	5

=== Svenska Mästerskapet 1914 ===
Final

November 11, 1914

AIK	7–2	Helsingborgs IF

Råsunda IP, Solna

=== Kamratmästerskapen 1914 ===
Final

December 6, 1914

IFK Göteborg	9–0	IFK Stockholm

Walhalla IP, Gothenburg

=== Wicanderska Välgörenhetsskölden 1914 ===
Final

May 27, 1914

AIK	4–1	Djurgårdens IF

Råsunda IP, Solna

== National team results ==
October 25, 1914
Friendly
№ 30

Sweden	7–0	Norway
Ekroth 5', 80', 86'; Söderberg 20', 65', 68'; Johansson 47'

Råsunda IP, Solna
Attendance: 5,000
Referee: Vestergaard (Denmark)

Sweden: Erik Bergqvist - Theodor Malm, Erik Runeborg - Bertil Nordenskjöld, Ragnar Wicksell, David Spångberg - Gottfrid Johansson, Sten Söderberg, Iwar Swensson, Helge Ekroth, Karl Ansén.

June 6, 1915
Friendly
№ 31

Denmark	2–0	Sweden
Olsen 47'; Nielsen 53'

Idrætsparken, Copenhagen
Attendance: 14,000
Referee: Tromp (Netherlands)

Sweden: John Karlsson-Nottorp - Albert Andersson, Valdus Lund - Sven Friberg, Ragnar Wicksell, Josef Appelgren - Bror Hagard, Caleb Schylander, Erik Börjesson, Erik Hjelm, Rolf Borssén.

June 27, 1915
Friendly
№ 32

Norway	1–1	Sweden
Engebretsen 54'		Gunnarsson 82'

Gamle Frogner Stadion, Kristiania
Attendance: 10,000
Referee: Vestergaard (Denmark)

Sweden: Erik Bergqvist - Theodor Malm, Erik Runeborg - Bertil Nordenskjöld, Bruno Lindström, Gustaf Ekberg - Marcus Dantowitch, Walfrid Gunnarsson, Iwar Swensson, Sten Söderberg, Karl Ansén.

== National team players in season 1914/15 ==
name	pos.	caps	goals	club
Albert "Banjo" Andersson	DF	1	0	Örgryte IS
Karl Ansén	FW	2	0	AIK
Josef "Päron" Appelgren	MF	1	0	Örgryte IS
Erik "Berka" Bergqvist	GK	2	0	AIK
Erik "Börje" Börjesson	FW	1	0	IFK Göteborg
Rolf Borssén	FW	1	0	IFK Göteborg
Marcus Dantowitch (Dante)	FW	1	0	Johanneshofs IF
Gustaf "Blekberg" Ekberg	MF	1	0	Johanneshofs IF
Helge "Ekis" Ekroth	FW	1	3	AIK
Sven Friberg	MF	1	0	Örgryte IS
Walfrid "Valle" Gunnarsson	FW	1	1	AIK
Bror Hagard	FW	1	0	Örgryte IS
Erik Hjelm	FW	1	0	IFK Göteborg
Gottfrid "Gotte" Johansson	FW	1	1	Djurgårdens IF
John "Stjärna" Karlsson-Nottorp	GK	1	0	IFK Göteborg
Bruno Lindström	MF	1	0	AIK
Valdus "Gobben" Lund	DF	1	0	IFK Göteborg
Theodor "Todde" Malm	DF	2	0	AIK
Bertil "Nocke" Nordenskjöld	MF	2	0	Djurgårdens IF
Erik Runeborg	DF	2	0	AIK
Caleb "Kairo" Schylander	FW	1	0	IFK Göteborg
Sten "Knata" Söderberg	FW	2	3	Djurgårdens IF
David "Spånga" Spångberg	MF	1	0	AIK
Iwar "Iffa-Sven" Swensson	FW	2	0	AIK
Ragnar "Ragge" Wicksell	MF	2	0	Djurgårdens IF
