= 1915–16 in Swedish football =

The 1915-16 season in Swedish football, starting August 1915 and ending July 1916:

== Honours ==
=== Official titles ===
Title	Team	Reason
Swedish Champions 1915	Djurgårdens IF	Winners of Svenska Mästerskapet

=== Competitions ===
Level	Competition	Team
1st level	Svenska Serien 1915–16	IFK Göteborg
2nd level	Uppsvenska Serien 1915–16	Westermalms IF
2nd level	Mellansvenska Serien 1915–16	IK Sleipner
2nd level	Västsvenska Serien 1916	Surte IS
Championship Cup	Svenska Mästerskapet 1915	Djurgårdens IF
Cup competition	Kamratmästerskapen 1915	IFK Göteborg
Cup competition	Wicanderska Välgörenhetsskölden 1915	Djurgårdens IF

== Promotions, relegations and qualifications ==
=== Promotions ===
Promoted from	Promoted to	Team	Reason
Unknown	Svenska Serien 1916–17	Helsingborgs IF	Unknown
Unknown	Västsvenska Serien 1916–17	IS Halmia	Unknown
Unknown	Västsvenska Serien 1916–17	IFK Halmstad	Unknown
Unknown	Västsvenska Serien 1916–17	Jönköpings IS	Unknown

=== League transfers ===
Transferred from	Transferred to	Team	Reason
Uppsvenska Serien 1915–16	Mellansvenska Serien 1916–17	Westermalms IF	Unknown

=== Relegations ===
Relegated from	Relegated to	Team	Reason
Svenska Serien 1915–16	Västsvenska Serien 1916–17	GAIS	Unknown
Uppsvenska Serien 1915–16	Unknown	Falu IK	Unknown
Västsvenska Serien 1916	Unknown	Surte IS	Unknown

== Domestic results ==
=== Svenska Serien 1915–16 ===

	Team	Pld	W	D	L	GF		GA	GD	Pts
1	IFK Göteborg	10	6	3	1	27	–	9	+18	15
2	AIK	10	7	1	2	33	–	13	+20	15
3	Örgryte IS	10	5	1	4	21	–	15	+6	11
4	GAIS	10	4	0	6	17	–	24	-7	8
5	IFK Norrköping	10	3	0	7	12	–	36	-24	6
6	Djurgårdens IF	10	2	1	7	15	–	28	-13	5

=== Uppsvenska Serien 1915–16 ===

	Team	Pld	W	D	L	GF		GA	GD	Pts
1	Westermalms IF	12	7	3	2	36	–	12	+24	17
2	Sandvikens AIK	12	7	3	2	35	–	18	+17	17
3	Hammarby IF	12	8	1	3	43	–	27	+16	17
4	Gefle IF	12	6	1	5	17	–	17	0	13
5	IK Sirius	12	4	3	5	21	–	22	-1	11
6	IFK Gävle	12	2	2	8	11	–	40	-29	6
7	Falu IK	12	1	1	10	16	–	43	-27	3

=== Mellansvenska Serien 1915–16 ===
	Team	Pld	W	D	L	GF		GA	GD	Pts
1	IK Sleipner	12	7	4	1	22	–	15	+7	18
2	Mariebergs IK	12	6	5	1	29	–	16	+13	17
3	IFK Uppsala	12	6	3	3	22	–	16	+6	15
4	IFK Stockholm	12	3	4	5	22	–	23	-1	10
5	IFK Västerås	12	4	2	6	19	–	25	-6	10
6	IFK Eskilstuna	12	2	4	6	18	–	22	-4	8
7	Köpings IS	12	3	0	9	11	–	26	-15	6

=== Västsvenska Serien 1916 ===
	Team	Pld	W	D	L	GF		GA	GD	Pts
1	Surte IS	3	2	0	1	6	–	4	+2	4
2	IFK Uddevalla	3	2	0	1	7	–	7	0	4
3	IF Elfsborg	3	1	0	2	10	–	6	+4	2
4	IK Wega	3	1	0	2	4	–	10	-6	2

=== Svenska Mästerskapet 1915 ===
Final

October 17, 1915

Djurgårdens IF	4–1	Örgryte IS

Stockholms Stadion, Stockholm

=== Kamratmästerskapen 1915 ===
Final

August 15, 1915

IFK Göteborg	10–0	IFK Gävle

Walhalla IP, Gothenburg

=== Wicanderska Välgörenhetsskölden 1915 ===
Final

November 7, 1915

Djurgårdens IF	1–0	AIK

Stockholms Stadion, Stockholm

== National team results ==
October 24, 1915
Friendly
No. 33

Sweden	5–2	Norway
Swensson 10', 14', 61'; Gunnarsson 44', 77'		Ditlev-Simonsen 65'; Wold 85' (p)

Stockholms Stadion, Stockholm
Attendance: 8,000
Referee: Vestergaard (Denmark)

Sweden: Sven Jonsson - Melcher Johansson-Säwensten, Helmer Lundberg - Bruno Lindström, Knut Nilsson, Gustaf Carlson - Rune Bergström, Walfrid Gunnarsson, Iwar Swensson, Helge Ekroth, Gunnar Linder.

October 31, 1915
Friendly
No. 34

Sweden	0–2	Denmark
		Nielsen 4'; Rohde 42'

Stockholms Stadion, Stockholm
Attendance: 15,000
Referee: Meerum-Terwogt (Netherlands)

Sweden: John Karlsson-Nottorp - Valdus Lund, Henning Svensson - Bertil Nordenskjöld, Götrik Frykman, Ragnar Wicksell - Georg Bengtsson, Caleb Schylander, Iwar Swensson, Erik Hjelm, Carl Karlstrand.

June 4, 1916
Friendly
No. 35

Denmark	2–0	Sweden
Nielsen 19', 48'

Idrætsparken, Copenhagen
Attendance: 20,000
Referee: Tromp (Netherlands)

Sweden: John Karlsson-Nottorp - Valdus Lund, Henning Svensson - Sven Friberg, Bruno Lindström, Josef Appelgren - Harry Magnusson, Walfrid Gunnarsson, Iwar Swensson, Louis Groth, Carl Karlstrand.

July 2, 1916
Friendly
No. 36

Sweden	6–0	Norway
Karlstrand 25'; Gustafsson 30', 61', 80'; Wicksell 50'; Swensson 65'

Stockholms Stadion, Stockholm
Attendance: 6,000
Referee: Vestergaard (Denmark)

Sweden: Erik Bergqvist - Theodor Malm, Oscar Gustafsson - Bertil Nordenskjöld, Ragnar Wicksell, Bruno Lindström - Rune Bergström, Walfrid Gunnarsson, Iwar Swensson, Karl Gustafsson, Carl Karlstrand.

== National team players in season 1915/16 ==
name	pos.	caps	goals	club
Josef "Päron" Appelgren	MF	1	0	Örgryte IS
Georg "Joije" Bengtsson	FW	1	0	Hälsingborgs IF
Erik "Berka" Bergqvist	GK	1	0	AIK
Rune Bergström	FW	2	0	AIK
Gustaf "Gurra" Carlson	MF	1	0	Mariebergs IK
Helge "Ekis" Ekroth	FW	1	0	AIK
Sven Friberg	MF	1	0	Örgryte IS
Götrik "Putte" Frykman	MF	1	0	Djurgårdens IF
Louis "Grålle" Groth	FW	1	0	AIK
Walfrid "Valle" Gunnarsson	FW	3	2	AIK
Karl "Köping" Gustafsson	FW	1	3	Djurgårdens IF
Oscar Gustafsson	DF	1	0	Djurgårdens IF
Erik Hjelm	FW	1	0	IFK Göteborg
Melcher Johansson-Säwensten	DF	1	0	Djurgårdens IF
Sven "Fiskarn" Jonsson	GK	1	0	IK Sleipner
John "Stjärna" Karlsson-Nottorp	GK	2	0	IFK Göteborg
Carl Karlstrand	FW	3	1	Djurgårdens IF
Gunnar "Max" Linder	FW	1	0	Mariebergs IK
Bruno Lindström	MF	3	0	AIK
Valdus "Gobben" Lund	DF	2	0	IFK Göteborg
Helmer Lundberg	DF	1	0	Mariebergs IK
Harry "Dicko" Magnusson	FW	1	0	Örgryte IS
Theodor "Todde" Malm	DF	1	0	AIK
Knut "Knutte" Nilsson	MF	1	0	AIK
Bertil "Nocke" Nordenskjöld	MF	2	0	Djurgårdens IF
Caleb "Kairo" Schylander	FW	1	0	IFK Göteborg
Henning Svensson	DF	2	0	IFK Göteborg
Iwar "Iffa-Sven" Swensson	FW	4	4	AIK
Ragnar "Ragge" Wicksell	MF	2	1	Djurgårdens IF
