= Maartmann =

Maartmann is a surname. Notable people with the surname include:

- Harald Maartmann (1926–2021), Norwegian cross country skier
- Titti Maartmann (1920–2018), Norwegian luger
- Knud Geelmuyden Fleischer Maartmann (1821–1888), Norwegian politician
- Rolf Maartmann (1887–1941), Norwegian football player
- Erling Maartmann (1887–1944), Norwegian football player
