= Herczog =

Herczog is a Hungarian surname. Notable people with the surname include:

- Andreas Herczog (1947–2021), Hungarian-born Swiss politician
- Edit Herczog (born 1961), Hungarian Socialist Party politician
- Ede Herczog (1880–1953), Hungarian football referee and manager of the Hungarian national team
- László Herczog (born 1949), Hungarian politician and economist
