= Jacob Levin =

Jacob Levin may refer to:

- Jacob Levin (chess player) (1904–1992), American chess master
- Jacob Levin (footballer) (1890–1945), Swedish football player

== See also ==
- Levin (surname)
