= Knut Johansson =

Knut Johansson may refer to:

- Knut Johansson (tug of war) (1888–1953), Swedish tug of war competitor
- Knut Johansson (footballer, born 1892), Finnish footballer, died 1961
- Knut Johansson (footballer, born 1902), Swedish footballer, died 1987
- Knut Johansson (footballer, born 1918), Swedish footballer, died 2001
