= Sven Gunnarsson =

New Sweden colonist

Sven Gunnarsson (d. 1678) was a founder of the New Sweden colony, owner of land which today is most of present-day Queen Village in Philadelphia, and a progenitor of the Du Pont family in modern-day Delaware.

== New Sweden colony ==
Gunnarsson was sent by the Swedish government in 1639 to work in the new colony, and by 1645 had become a freeman. In 1653, he was one of 22 signers of a petition of grievances against Gov. Johan Printz, which ultimately led to his removal. He volunteered to defend Fort Christina against the Dutch invasion, but after the colony was surrendered, removed with his family north. They settled on 1,125 acres (4.55 km^{2}) at a place called Wicaco, a former Indian settlement, which would become what is modern-day Queen Village in Philadelphia. His land was home to the first log church in the area, built in 1677, today known as the Gloria Dei (Old Swedes') Church.

Sven Gunnarsson died in 1678 and was one of the first buried at the church. He had five children: Anders, Olle, Gertrud, Sven, and a daughter of unknown name. His son Sven Svensson would go on to serve in the government at Upland Court and the Pennsylvania Provincial Assembly, while the son of Anders, Andrew Swanson, would become a progenitor of the Du Pont family in modern-day Delaware. The old patronymicon would be anglicized to Swanson in many instances.
