= Karl Persson =

Swedish footballer

Personal information
- Full name: Karl Raoul Persson
- Date of birth: 22 August 1889
- Place of birth: Högbo, Sweden
- Date of death: 13 April 1979 (aged 89)
- Place of death: Sandviken, Sweden
- Position: Forward

Senior career*
Years	Team	Apps	(Gls)
- Uppsala
- Sandvikens AIK

International career
1911–1912	Sweden	2	(3)
- * Club domestic league appearances and goals

Karl Raoul Persson (22 August 1889 – 13 April 1979) was a Swedish footballer who played for Uppsala and Sandvikens AIK. He was capped twice for the Sweden men's national football team in 1911 and 1912, scoring three goals.

== Career statistics ==
=== International ===
Appearances and goals by national team and year
National team	Year	Apps	Goals
Sweden	1911	1	1
Sweden	1912	1	2
Total		2	3

=== International goals ===
Scores and results list Sweden's goal tally first.

No	Date	Venue	Opponent	Score	Result	Competition
1.	22 October 1911	Eläintarha Stadium, Helsinki, Finland	Finland	2–2	5–2	Friendly
2.	27 June 1912	Råsunda IP, Solna, Sweden	Finland	5–1	7–1	Friendly
3.	27 June 1912	Råsunda IP, Solna, Sweden	Finland	7–1	7–1	Friendly
