= Piero Campelli =

Italian footballer (1893–1946)

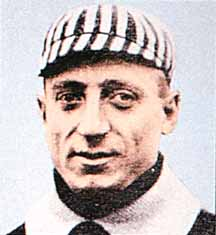

Personal information
- Date of birth: 20 December 1893
- Place of birth: Milan, Italy
- Date of death: 21 June 1946 (aged 52)
- Place of death: Milan, Italy
- Position: Goalkeeper

Senior career*
Years	Team	Apps	(Gls)
1910–1925	Inter	179	(0)

International career
1912–1921	Italy	11	(0)
- * Club domestic league appearances and goals

Piero Campelli (Italian pronunciation: [ˈpjɛːro kamˈpɛlli]; 20 December 1893 – 21 June 1946) was an Italian amateur footballer who played as a goalkeeper. At club level, he played for Inter, while he competed in the 1912 Summer Olympics and the 1920 Summer Olympics with the Italy national football team.

== Club career ==
Campelli was born in Milan. He spent his entire club career with Inter, making 179 league appearances for the club between 1910 and 1925, and winning two Serie A titles in 1910 and 1920.

== International career ==
At international level, Campelli was the goalkeeper of the Italian Olympic squad in 1912 and played one match in the main tournament as well as two matches in the consolation tournament. He later also took part at the 1920 Summer Olympics with Italy. He made a total of 11 international appearances for Italy between 1912 and 1921.

== Style of play ==
Regarded as a precocious talent in his youth, Campelli was known in particular for his handling of the ball, and was one of the first goalkeepers in Italy to attempt to catch shots or come off his line to claim crosses rather than palming or punching them away, thus contributing to the development and popularisation of this particular goalkeeping technique.

== Honours ==
Inter

- Serie A: 1909–10, 1919–20
