= Thomas Thudin =

Swedish footballer

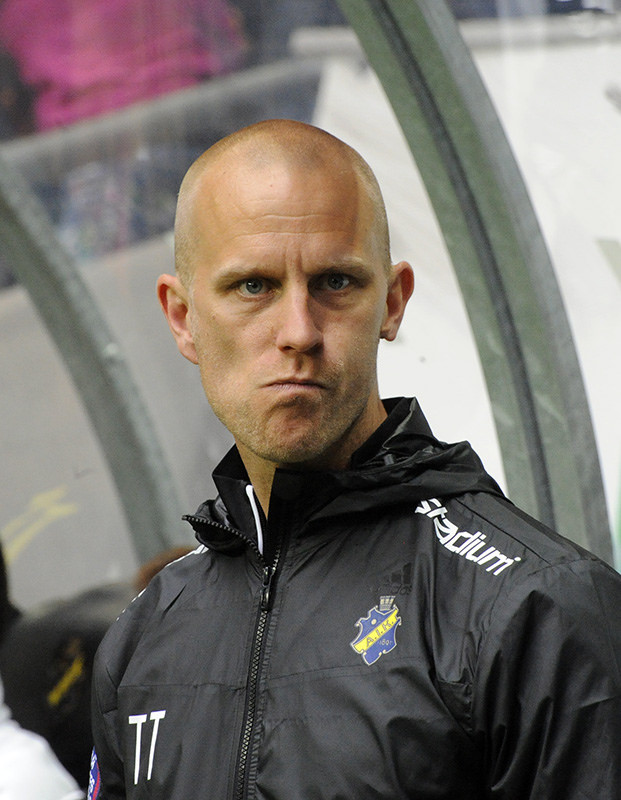

Personal information
- Full name: Thomas Thudin
- Date of birth: 30 July 1973 (age 53)
- Place of birth: Sweden
- Height: 1.82 m (6 ft 0 in)
- Position: Goalkeeper

Youth career
- Väsby IK

Senior career*
| Years | Team | Apps | (Gls) |
| 1997–2003 | Väsby IK | | |
| 2004–2005 | Assyriska FF | 1 | (0) |
| 2006 | Valsta Syrianska IK | | |
| 2007–2012 | Väsby United | 76 | (0) |
| 2012 | Åtvidabergs FF | 0 | (0) |
- * Club domestic league appearances and goals

Thomas Thudin (born 30 July 1973) is a Swedish former footballer who is assistant goalkeeper coach at AIK.
