= Bernhard Graubart =

Austrian footballer

Personal information
- Date of birth: 22 December 1888
- Place of birth: Bolechów

Bernhard Graubart (born 22 December 1888, date of death unknown) was an Austrian football player. He was born in Bolechów. He played club football for DFC Prag, and internationally for the Austria national football team. He competed at the 1912 Summer Olympics in Stockholm.
