= Miklós Fekete =

Hungarian footballer

Personal information
- Date of birth: 10 February 1892
- Place of birth: Budapest, Austria-Hungary
- Date of death: 2 July 1917 (aged 25)

International career
Years	Team	Apps	(Gls)
- Hungary

Miklós Fekete (10 February 1892 – 2 July 1917) was a Hungarian footballer. He competed in the men's tournament at the 1912 Summer Olympics. In World War I, the Russians took him prisoner, and he later died from an infection.
