= Sverre Jensen =

Norwegian footballer (1893-1963)

Personal information
- Date of birth: 22 January 1893
- Place of birth: Kristiania, Norway
- Date of death: 26 October 1963 (aged 70)
- Position: Midfielder

Senior career*
Years	Team	Apps	(Gls)
- IF Ready

International career
- Norway
- * Club domestic league appearances and goals

Sverre Jensen (22 January 1893 – 26 October 1963) was a Norwegian football player. He was born in Kristiania. He played for the club Ready, and also for the Norwegian national team. He competed at the 1912 Summer Olympics in Stockholm.
