= Josef Kaltenbrunner =

Austrian footballer (1888–1951)

Personal information
- Date of birth: 2 May 1888
- Date of death: 4 August 1951 (aged 63)
- Position: Goalkeeper

Senior career*
Years	Team	Apps	(Gls)
1911–1914	SK Rapid Wien	44	

International career
1907–1913	Austria	11	(0)
- * Club domestic league appearances and goals

Josef Kaltenbrunner (2 May 1888 – 4 August 1951) was an Austrian international footballer. He competed at the 1912 Summer Olympics.
