= Ladislaus Kurpiel =

Austrian footballer (1883–1930)

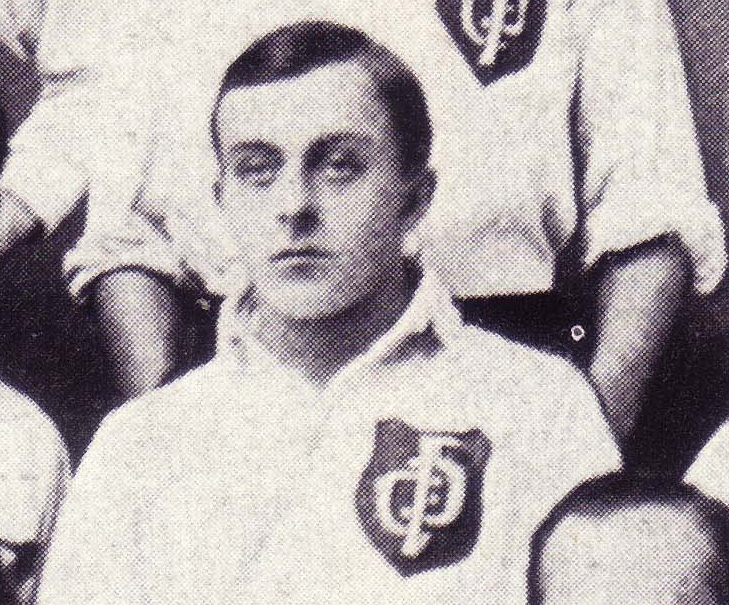

Personal information
- Full name: Ladislaus Kurpiel
- Date of birth: 13 November 1883
- Place of birth: Prague, Austrian Empire
- Date of death: 24 June 1930 (aged 46)
- Place of death: Prague, Czechoslovakia
- Position: Midfielder

Senior career*
Years	Team	Apps	(Gls)
1897–1903	DFC Prag		
1903–1904	Vienna Cricket and Football Club		
1904–1913	DFC Prag		

International career
1908–1912	Austria	8	(0)
- * Club domestic league appearances and goals

Ladislaus Kurpiel (13 November 1883 – 24 June 1930) was an Austrian footballer who played as a midfielder for DFC Prag in the inaugural German football championship in 1903. He had a brief spell at Vienna Cricket and Football Club, and also represented the Austria national football team on eight occasions between 1908 and 1912. He also competed at the 1912 Summer Olympics.
