= Robert Cimera =

Austrian footballer

Personal information
- Date of birth: 17 September 1887
- Place of birth: Vienna, Austria-Hungary
- Position: Defender

Senior career*
Years	Team	Apps	(Gls)
1908–1914	DFC Prag		
1914–1916	SK Rapid Wien	7	
–1916	DFC Prag		

International career
1908–1915	Austria	10	(1)
- * Club domestic league appearances and goals

Robert Cimera (born 17 September 1887, date of death unknown) was an Austrian international footballer.

Cimera played in the 1912 Summer Olympics, scoring once in the match against Germany. He returned to DSC Prag as the club manager beginning in January 1924 until July 1926.
