= Bolechów =

- Village
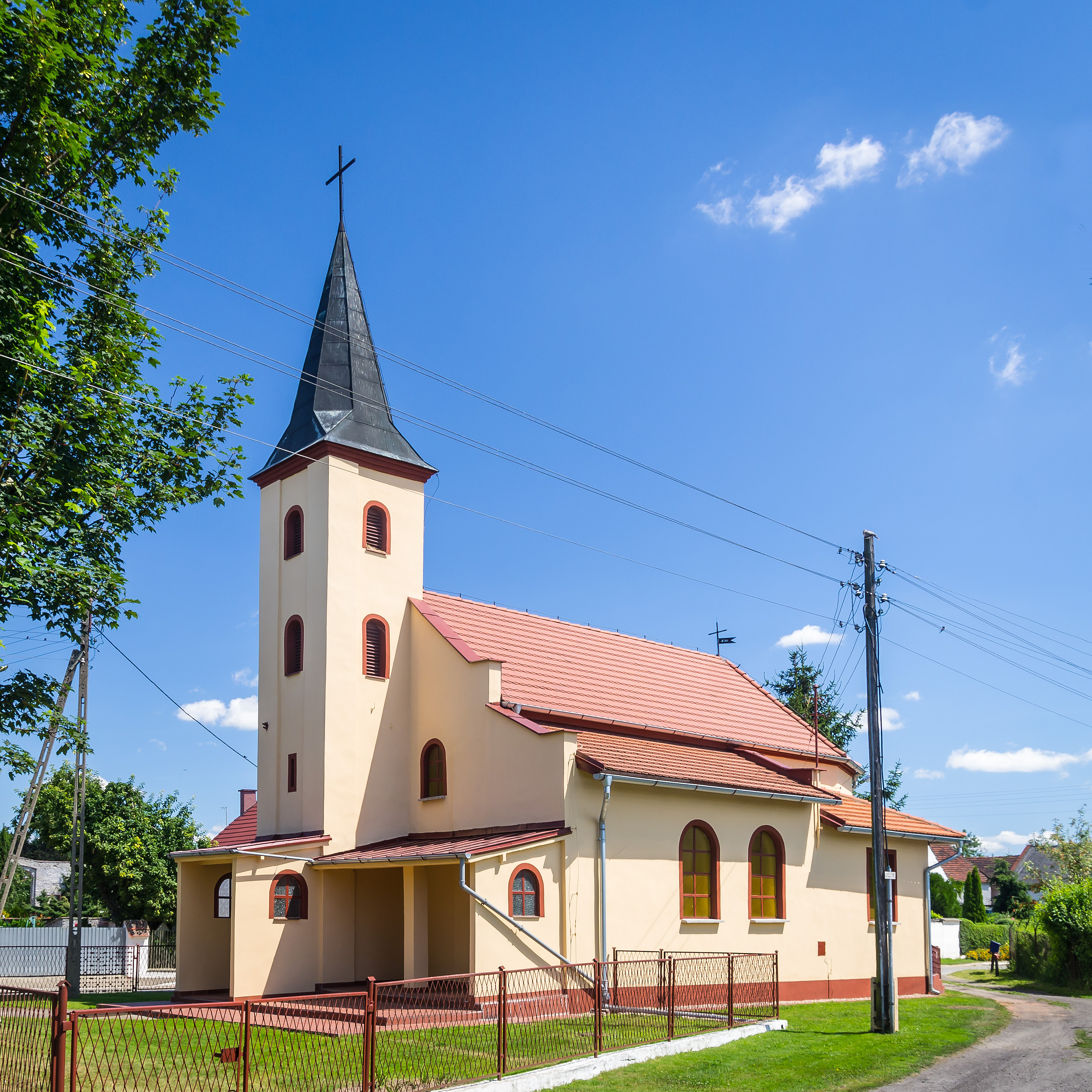
- Church of the Blessed Virgin Mary Queen of Poland

- Location within Poland
- Coordinates: 50°53′N 17°14′E
- Country: Poland
- Voivodeship: Lower Silesian
- County: Oława
- Gmina: Oława

Bolechów [bɔˈlɛxuf] is a village in the administrative district of Gmina Oława, within Oława County, Lower Silesian Voivodeship, in south-western Poland.

== People ==
- Albert Horn (1840-1921), German politician, member of German Reichstag
