= Ede Herczog =

Hungarian football referee (1880–1953)

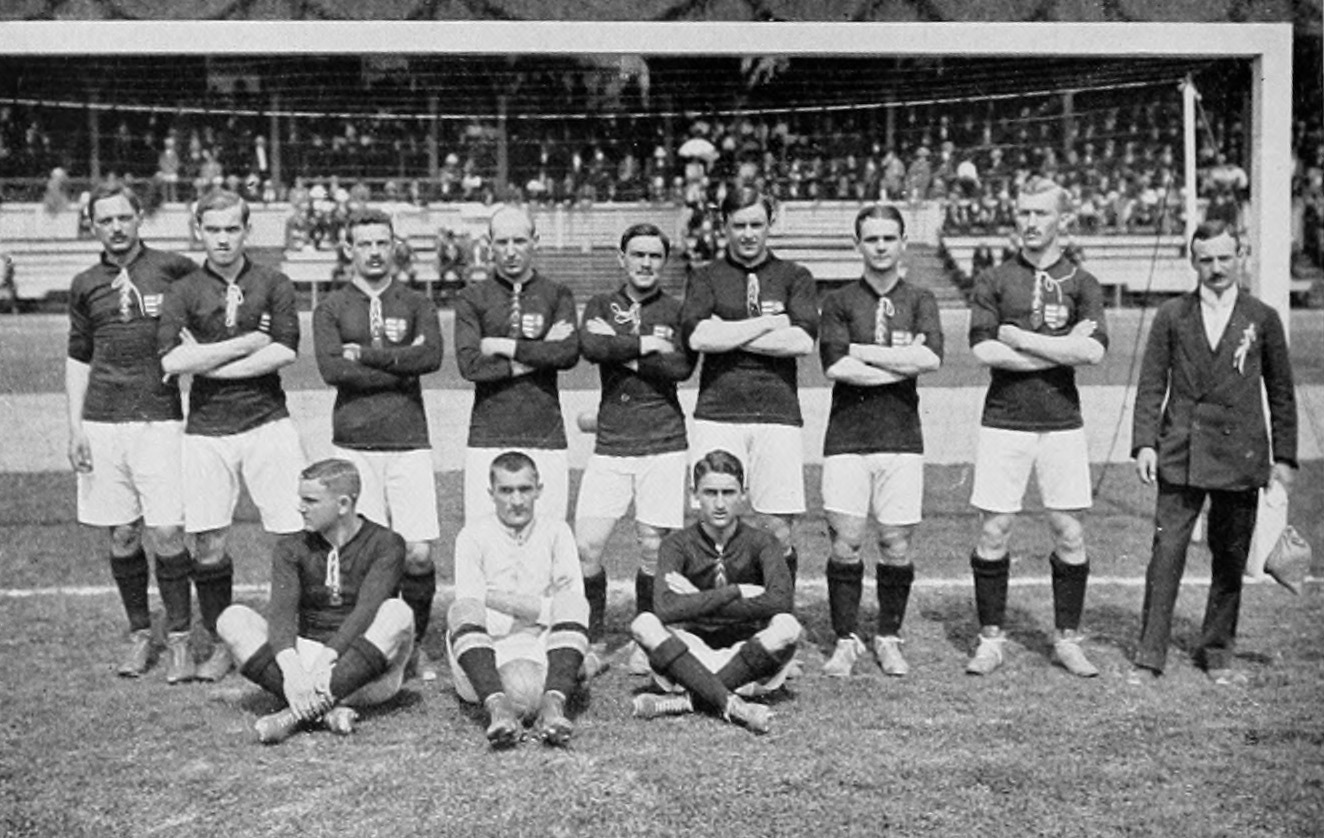
- Herczog (right) in 1912

Personal information
- Date of birth: 25 August 1880
- Place of birth: Pöttsching, Hungary
- Date of death: 14 September 1953 (aged 73)
- Place of death: Budapest, Hungary

Senior career*
| Years | Team | Apps | (Gls) |
| 1899–1901 | Magyar Úszó Egylet | | |

Managerial career
- 1911–1914: Hungary (22)
- 1916–1917: Hungary (9)
Refereeing career
Domestic
| Years | League | Role |
| 1901–1912 | Nemzeti Bajnokság I | Referee |
International
| Years | League | Role |
| 1905–12 | FIFA listed | Referee |
- * Club domestic league appearances and goals

Ede Herczog (25 August 1880 – 14 September 1953) was a Hungarian football referee, who officiated four international matches between 1905 and 1912, and a manager, who led the Hungarian national team from 1911 to 1914, and again in 1916–17.

== Sporting career ==
=== Refereeing career ===
During his youth, Herczog excelled in athletics, winning numerous first and second prizes in sprinting competitions in Budapest and Vienna; and also football, joining the ranks of Magyar Úszó Egylet (MÚE), one of the first football clubs opened in Hungary, and which debuted in the 1901 season of the Hungarian League, finished second. In addition to playing for MÚE, he was also a team referee for the training and friendly matches, and if he did not play for his own team, he accepted the invitation to referee other teams. At the time, it was not mandatory to take the refereeing exam to become one, but in 1901, the Hungarian Football Federation (MLSZ) stipulated that match referees must take an exam on the rules of the game, which he successfully passed. He went on to referee a total of 55 Nemzeti Bajnokság I matches between 1901 and 1919.

In 1905, the MLSZ nominated him as an international football referee, but since Hungary could not yet officially have a qualified international referee, his FIFA membership was only accepted two years later, in 1907. Herczog made his international debut on 9 April 1905, in a friendly match between Hungary and Austria, which ended in a goalless draw.

He had to wait three years for his next international match, another friendly, this time between Austria and England, which was followed by another four-year hiatus, returning to the international stage to officiate one match at the football tournament of the 1908 Olympic Games in London, the semifinal between Denmark and the Netherlands. Apart from the Dutch, Herczog and the Austrian Hugo Meisl were the only foreign referees of repute present in the tournament. On 5 July, the day after the Olympic final, Herczog refereed two unofficial international matches, the first between Norway and Russia, and the second between a Stockholm XI and Gothenburg XI. In total, Herczog refereed 4 official international matches between 1905 and 1912.

In 1923, Herczog was co-chairman of the first Hungarian Football Referees Board.

=== Managerial career ===
In 1911, Herczog replaced Frigyes Minder as the new manager of the Hungarian national team, and in the build-up for the 1912 Olympic Games in London, he organized two friendlies against Tottenham Hotspur in Budapest, drawing 2–2 and losing 4–3; Hungary went on to win the consolation tournament after beating Austria 3–0 in the final. In total, he coached Hungary in 22 matches, with 14 wins, 5 draws, and 3 losses, doing so without interruption and with professional consistency. His managerial career ended when he was mobilized during the outbreak of World War I in August 1914, where he served as a lieutenant at the front, being replaced by Minder.

Herczog went on to coach 9 more matches in 1916–17, for a total of 31 matches as an international coach. Between 1872 and 1920, Herczog was the coach who oversaw the most international matches with 31, ahead of the English Edgar Chadwick of the Netherlands with 25.

== Death ==
Herczog died in Budapest on 14 September 1953, at the age of 73.
