= Franz Weber (footballer) =

Austrian footballer

Franz Weber (3 July 1888 – 7 May 1947) was an Austrian football player. He was born in Vienna. He played for the club Vienna, and also for the Austria national football team. He competed at the 1912 Summer Olympics in Stockholm.
