= László Domonkos =

Hungarian footballer

Personal information
- Date of birth: 10 October 1886
- Place of birth: Budapest, Austria-Hungary
- Date of death: 25 September 1956 (aged 68)

International career
Years	Team	Apps	(Gls)
- Hungary

László Domonkos (10 October 1886 – 25 September 1956) was a Hungarian footballer. He competed in the men's tournament at the 1912 Summer Olympics.
