= Uno Lindbäck =

Finnish footballer (1891-1970)

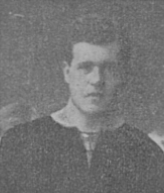

Personal information
- Date of birth: 11 January 1891
- Date of death: 8 January 1970 (aged 78)
- Position: Forward

Senior career*
Years	Team	Apps	(Gls)
1908–1911	HIFK		

International career
1911	Finland	1	(1)
- * Club domestic league appearances and goals

Uno Edmund Lindbäck (11 January 1891 – 8 January 1970) was a Finnish footballer who played for HIFK Helsinki.

Lindbäck was the first player to score for the Finland national football team. He shot the opening goal in Finland's first international on 22 October 1911 against Sweden at the Eläintarha Stadium, Helsinki.
