= Modesto Valle =

Italian footballer

Personal information
- Date of birth: 15 March 1893
- Place of birth: Biella, Italy
- Date of death: 7 June 1979 (aged 86)
- Place of death: Biella, Italy
- Position: Defender

Senior career*
Years	Team	Apps	(Gls)
1909–1914	Pro Vercelli	69	(6)

International career
1912–1914	Italy	7	(0)
- * Club domestic league appearances and goals

Modesto Valle (Italian pronunciation: [moˈdɛsto ˈvalle]; 15 March 1893 – 7 June 1979) was an Italian footballer who played as a defender. He competed for Italy in the men's football tournament at the 1912 Summer Olympics.

== Honours ==
=== Club ===
Pro Vercelli

Italian Football Championship: 1910–11, 1911–12, 1912–13
