= Gyula Rumbold =

Hungarian footballer

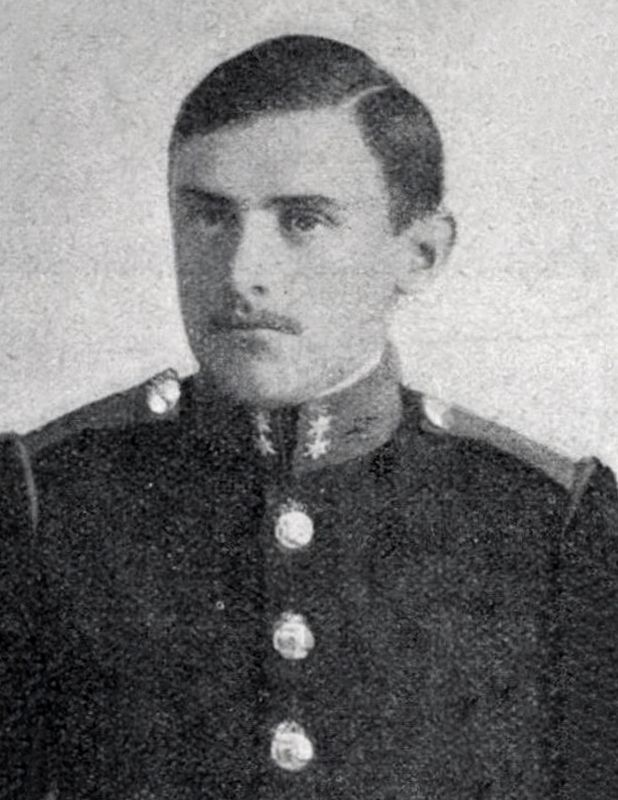

Gyula Rumbold (6 December 1887 – 5 October 1959) was a Hungarian amateur association football player who competed in the 1912 Summer Olympics. He was a member of the Hungarian Olympic squad and played one match in the main tournament as well as two matches in the consolation tournament. He also won seven Hungarian titles with Ferencvárosi TC, and was capped 33 times in the Hungary national team.
