= Pietro Leone =

Italian footballer

Personal information
- Date of birth: 31 January 1888
- Place of birth: Biella, Italy
- Date of death: 4 February 1958 (aged 70)
- Position: Midfielder

Senior career*
Years	Team	Apps	(Gls)
1906–1913	Pro Vercelli	112	(1)

International career
1911–1914	Italy	9	(0)

Managerial career
- 1931–1932: Salernitana
- 1935: Pro Vercelli
- * Club domestic league appearances and goals

Pietro Leone (Italian pronunciation: [ˈpjɛːtro leˈoːne]; 31 January 1888 – 4 February 1958) was an Italian footballer who played as a midfielder. He competed for Italy in the men's football tournament at the 1912 Summer Olympics.
