= Sven Svensson =

Swedish-American politician (1636–1696)

Representative, Pennsylvania Provincial Assembly
- In office 1683–1683

Personal details
- Born: 1636 Sweden
- Died: 1696 (aged 59–60) Philadelphia, Pennsylvania, US
- Profession: Politician, Justice

Sven Svensson (1636–1696) was a justice and legislator in Colonial Pennsylvania. He was born into a prominent family in the colony of New Sweden.

== Early life ==
Sven Svensson was born in 1636 in Sweden to Sven Gunnarsson, a forefather of the colony of New Sweden. His father was sent by the Swedish government to help form the Swedish colony. The family left in 1639 from Gothenburg on board the Kalmar Nyckel, eventually arriving at Swedes' Landing in present-day Delaware.

== Later life ==
Sven Svensson would become a Justice in the Upland Court. The Upland Court was dissolved by William Penn in 1683 under the Charter of Pennsylvania. He subsequently served a term as a representative in the Pennsylvania Provincial Assembly. In the spring of 1683, Svensson and his brothers agreed to provide the northern part of Wicaco (modern Southwark in Philadelphia) to William Penn, who was planning the city of Philadelphia. They were left with 230 acres apiece. The site of Gloria Dei (Old Swedes') Church had previously been donated by Sven Gunnarsson in 1677.

In 1658, Svensson married Catharina (Carin) Larsdotter. She was the daughter of Finnish immigrant Lasse Svensson, who had arrived in 1640 on the second voyage of the Kalmar Nyckel. Sven Svensson died at Wicaco in 1696, leaving behind 5 children: Lasse Swanson, (born c. 1660), Brigitta Swanson (born c. 1669), Margaret Swanson (born c. 1671), Barbara Swanson (born 1674) and Catharina Swanson (born 1682). His widow died during 1720. Both Sven and Catharina Svensson were buried in the churchyard of Gloria Dei Church in Philadelphia.
