= Knut Johansson (footballer, born 1892) =

Finnish footballer

Personal information
- Date of birth: 10 August 1892
- Date of death: 31 October 1961 (aged 69)
- Position: Forward

Senior career*
Years	Team	Apps	(Gls)
- Kiffen

International career
1914	Finland	1	(1)
- * Club domestic league appearances and goals

Knut Johansson (10 August 1892 – 31 October 1961) was a Finnish footballer who played for Kiffen. He featured once for the Finland national football team in 1914, scoring one goal.

== Career statistics ==
=== International ===
Appearances and goals by national team and year
National team	Year	Apps	Goals
Finland	1914	1	1
Total		1	1

=== International goals ===
Scores and results list Finland's goal tally first.

No	Date	Venue	Opponent	Score	Result	Competition
1.	24 May 1914	Råsunda IP, Solna, Sweden	Sweden	2–1	3–4	Friendly
