= Josef Börjesson =

Swedish footballer (1891–1971)

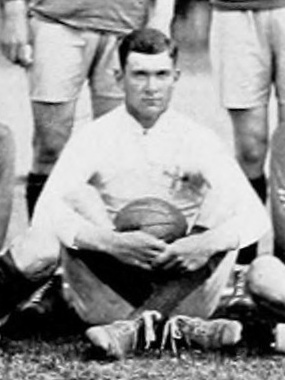
- Gustav Sandberg with Team Sweden at the 1912 Olympics before the game against the Netherlands

Personal information
- Born: 15 April 1891 Gothenburg, Sweden
- Died: 20 February 1971 (aged 79) Gothenburg, Sweden

Sport
- Sport: Football
- Position: Goalkeeper
- Club: Göteborgs FF

Josef Alfred Börjesson (15 April 1891 – 20 February 1971) was a Swedish amateur footballer who competed in the 1912 Summer Olympics for Team Sweden. He played as goalkeeper, and featured in one match in the main tournament as well as one match in the consolation tournament.
