= Béla Sebestyén =

Hungarian footballer

Personal information
- Full name: Béla Sebestyén
- Date of birth: 23 January 1886
- Place of birth: Budapest, Austria-Hungary
- Date of death: 19 December 1959 (aged 73)
- Place of death: Budapest, Hungary
- Position: Winger

Senior career*
Years	Team	Apps	(Gls)
–	MTK	?	(?)

International career
1906–1912	Hungary	24	(2)
- * Club domestic league appearances and goals

Béla Sebestyén (23 January 1886–19 December 1959) was a Hungarian international footballer who played as a winger. Sebestyén was Jewish. He played club football for MTK. He also represented his country at the international level, earning 24 caps between 1906 and 1912, and appearing at the 1912 Summer Olympics. He later coached MTK.He won one national championship and two national cup titles. Between 1906 and 1912, he played 24 matches with the Hungary national team and scored two goals. Sebestyén was a member of the 1912 Hungarian Olympic team. On the national team, together with Sándor Bodnár, he was one of the best right wings in Europe. Sebestyén finished his football career relatively early, at the age of 28, after a serious injury.

== See also ==
- List of Jewish footballers
