= Erik Dahlström =

Swedish footballer

Personal information
- Full name: Erik Arvid Teofron Dahlström
- Date of birth: 26 June 1894
- Place of birth: Eskilstuna, Sweden
- Date of death: 30 October 1953 (aged 59)
- Place of death: Eskilstuna, Sweden
- Position: Forward

Senior career*
Years	Team	Apps	(Gls)
- IFK Eskilstuna

International career
1912–1921	Sweden	3	(2)
- * Club domestic league appearances and goals

Erik Arvid Teofron Dahlström (26 June 1894 – 30 October 1953) was a Swedish football player, who competed in the 1912 Summer Olympics. He was a member of the Swedish Olympic squad in 1912. He played as forward one match in the consolation tournament.
