= Antal Vágó =

Hungarian footballer (1891–1944)

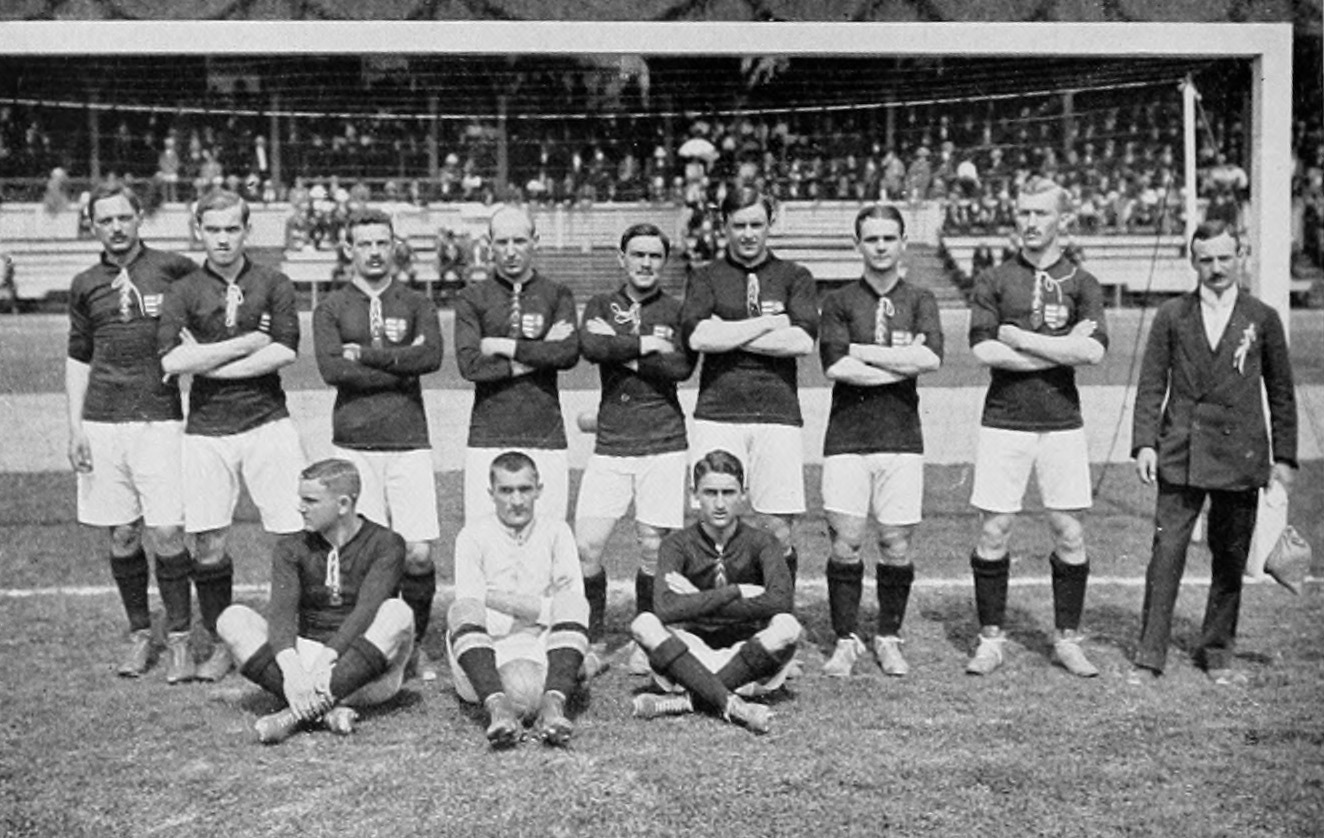
- Hungary national football team at the 1912 Summer Olympics. Vágó is standing fourth from the right.

Personal information
- Full name: Antal Vágó
- Date of birth: 9 August 1891
- Place of birth: Pásztó, Austria-Hungary
- Date of death: 30 December 1944 (aged 53)
- Place of death: Budapest, Hungary
- Position: Midfielder

Youth career
- 1906–1908: Fővárosi TC

Senior career*
Years	Team	Apps	(Gls)
1908–1911	Fővárosi TC	?	(?)
1911–1923	MTK	?	(?)

International career^{‡}
1908–1917	Hungary	17	(0)
- * Club domestic league appearances and goals as of 23 January 2016 ‡ National team caps and goals as of 17 January 2016

Antal Vágó , Weiss (9 August 1891 – 30 December 1944) was a Hungarian international footballer who played as a midfielder.

== Life ==
Vágó, who was Jewish, played club football for MTK, playing midfield for 12 seasons and winning the league nine time, and Fővárosi TC. He also represented Hungary national team at international level, earning 17 caps between 1908 and 1917. He also competed at the 1912 Summer Olympics.

He was shot dead into the Danube during the Arrow Cross rule.

== Sources ==
- Antal Vágó Bio, Stats and Results
- Antal Zoltán – Hoffer József: Alberttől Zsákig, Budapest, Sportkiadó, 1968
- Rejtő László – Lukács László – Szepesi György: Felejthetetlen 90 percek, Budapest, Sportkiadó, 1977, ISBN 963-253-501-4
