= Kálmán Szury =

Hungarian footballer

Personal information
- Date of birth: 4 February 1889
- Place of birth: Budapest, Austria-Hungary
- Date of death: 12 April 1915 (aged 26)

Senior career*
Years	Team	Apps	(Gls)
- Budapesti AK

International career
- Hungary
- * Club domestic league appearances and goals

Kálmán Szury (4 February 1889 – 12 April 1915) was a Hungarian footballer. He competed in the men's tournament at the 1912 Summer Olympics.
