= Andreas Herczog =

Swiss politician (1947–2021)

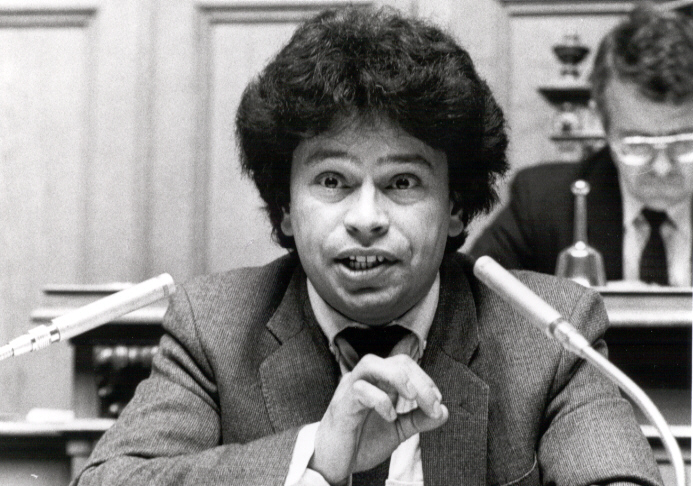
- Herczog in 1986

Member of the Swiss National Council
- In office 26 November 1979 – 5 December 1999
- Constituency: Canton of Zürich

Personal details
- Born: 11 February 1947 Budapest, Second Hungarian Republic
- Died: 12 September 2021 (aged 74) Liestal, Switzerland
- Party: SP; POCH

Andreas Herczog (11 February 1947 – 12 September 2021) was a Hungarian-born Swiss politician.

== Biography ==
Herczog represented the Canton of Zürich in the National Council from 1979 to 1999, first as a member of the Progressive Organizations of Switzerland and later the Social Democratic Party of Switzerland. In 2010, he became President of the Commission d'arbitrage dans le domaine des chemins de fer. Aside from politics, he founded the architectural firm "Herczog Hubeli" alongside Ernst Hubeli.

Andreas Herczog died from COVID-19 on 12 September 2021, during the COVID-19 pandemic in Switzerland. He was 74.
