= Angelo Binaschi =

Italian footballer (1890-1973)

Personal information
- Full name: Angelo Giovanni Mauro Binaschi
- Date of birth: 15 January 1890
- Place of birth: Cozzo, Kingdom of Italy
- Date of death: 15 March 1973 (aged 83)
- Position: Defender

Senior career*
Years	Team	Apps	(Gls)
1907–1921	Pro Vercelli	113	(2)

International career
1911–1913	Italy	9	(0)
- * Club domestic league appearances and goals

Angelo Giovanni Mauro Binaschi (Italian pronunciation: [ˈandʒelo biˈnaski]; 15 January 1890 – 15 March 1973) was an Italian professional footballer who played as a defender.

At club level, he played for U.S. Pro Vercelli Calcio for 11 seasons, winning the Italian league championship 5 times (1909, 1910, 1911, 1913 and 1921). He made his international debut for the Italy national football team on 6 January 1911 in a game against Hungary.

He represented Italy at the 1912 Summer Olympics.

== Honours ==
=== Player ===
Pro Vercelli

- Italian Football Championship: 1908, 1909, 1910–11, 1911–12, 1912–13, 1920–21
