= Lars Schybergson =

Finnish footballer (1884–1976)

Personal information
- Date of birth: 7 December 1884
- Place of birth: Helsinki, Finland
- Date of death: 12 December 1976 (aged 92)
- Place of death: Helsinki, Finland

International career
Years	Team	Apps	(Gls)
- Finland

Lars Schybergson (7 December 1884 – 12 December 1976) was a Finnish footballer. He played in one match for the Finland national football team in 1914.
