= Karl Braunsteiner =

Austrian footballer (1891–1916)

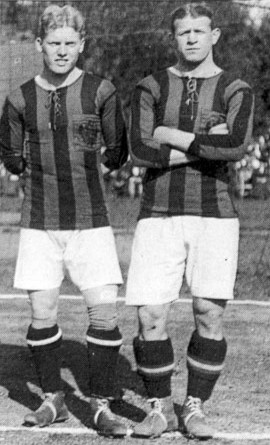
- Karl Braunsteiner and Josef Brandstätter

Personal information
- Date of birth: 27 October 1891
- Date of death: 19 April 1916 (aged 24)
- Place of death: Tashkent, Uzbekistan
- Height: 1.68 m (5 ft 6 in)
- Position: Defender

Senior career*
| Years | Team | Apps | (Gls) |
- Wiener SC

International career
| | Austria | 8 | (0) |
- * Club domestic league appearances and goals

Karl Braunsteiner (27 October 1891 – 19 April 1916) was an Austrian football (soccer) player.

== Club career ==
Regarded as one of the biggest talents of his era, the defender played for Wiener Sportclub.

During World War I he came to Poland as a gunner. He was captured and died in Tashkent due to typhoid fever as a prisoner of war.

== International career ==
Braunsteiner was a member of the Austrian Olympic squad at the 1912 Summer Olympics and played two matches in the main tournament as well as three matches in the consolation tournament.

For the Austria national football team he played 8 games.

== See also ==
- List of Olympians killed in World War I
