= Gustav Sandberg =

Swedish footballer

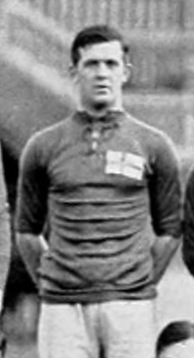
- Gustav Sandberg at the 1912 Olympics

Personal information
- Born: 29 July 1888 Gothenburg, Sweden
- Died: 8 February 1956 (aged 67) Gothenburg, Sweden

Sport
- Sport: Football
- Club: Örgryte IS

Gustav "Skädda" Sandberg (29 July 1888 – 8 February 1956) was a Swedish football (soccer) player who competed in the 1912 Summer Olympics. He played as a midfielder one match in the main tournament.
