= Karl Ansén =

Swedish footballer

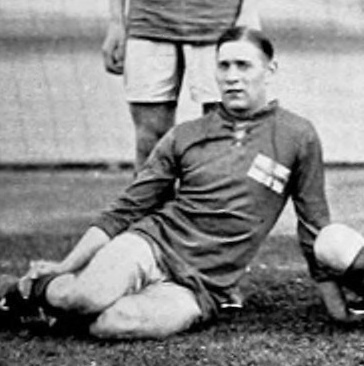
- Ansén at the 1912 Olympics

Personal information
- Date of birth: 26 July 1887
- Place of birth: Stockholm, Sweden
- Date of death: 20 July 1959 (aged 71)
- Place of death: Morgongåva, Sweden

Senior career*
Years	Team	Apps	(Gls)
1908–1917	AIK		

International career
1908–1915	Sweden	17	(0)
- * Club domestic league appearances and goals

Karl "Kalle" Anshelm Ansén (26 July 1887 – 20 July 1959) was a Swedish football player who competed at the 1908 and 1912 Olympics. In 1912 he played as forward one match in the main tournament as well as one match in the consolation tournament.
