= Oscar Gustafsson =

Swedish footballer

Oscar Gustafsson

Nils Oscar Gustafsson (September 25, 1889 - November 12, 1953) was a Swedish amateur football (soccer) player who competed in the 1912 Summer Olympics. He was a member of the Swedish Olympic squad. He did not play in a match, but was a reserve player.
