= Erling Maartmann =

Norwegian footballer (1887-1944)

Erling Maartmann (3 November 1887 – 10 February 1944) was a Norwegian football player. He was born in Oslo. He played for the club Lyn, and also for the Norwegian national team. He competed at the 1912 Summer Olympics in Stockholm. He was Norwegian champion with Lyn in 1908, 1909, 1910 and 1911. His twin brother Rolf Maartmann was also an international football player.
