= AIK Fotboll =

Association football club in Sweden

AIK Stockholm
- Full name: Allmänna Idrottsklubben
- Nickname: Gnaget
- Short name: AIK
- Founded: 15 February 1891; 135 years ago
- Ground: Nationalarenan
- Capacity: 54,329 (50,653 international)
- Chairman: Mikael Jomer
- Head coach: José Riveiro
- League: Allsvenskan
- 2025: Allsvenskan, 7th of 16
- Website: www.aikfotboll.se
| Home colours | Away colours | Third colours |

AIK Fotboll (LSE: 0DI2), more commonly known simply as AIK (Swedish pronunciation: [ˈɑ̂ːiːˌkoː]), an abbreviation for Allmänna Idrottsklubben (meaning the public or general sports club), and internationally commonly referred to as AIK Stockholm, is a Swedish professional football club from Stockholm, competing in Allsvenskan, the top flight of Swedish football. The club was founded in 1891 and the football department was established in 1896.

AIK's home ground is Nationalarenan, located in Solna, bordering Stockholm City Centre.

AIK commands one of the largest supporter bases in the Nordic countries, highlighted by setting an all-time Scandinavian record with an average home attendance of 30,024 spectators during the 2025 season. The club has also finished as Sweden's highest-attended team in a record 41 different seasons.

AIK has 12 championship titles and is third in the all-time Allsvenskan table. The club holds the record for having played the most seasons in the Swedish top flight.

In Europe, AIK reached the quarter-finals of the 1996–97 UEFA Cup Winners' Cup, qualified for the 1999–00 UEFA Champions League group stage, and competed in the 2012–13 UEFA Europa League group stage.

== Kit ==
The first shirt is black and the second shirt is white. Shorts are white or, on rare occasions, black. Socks are striped in black and yellow; second socks are all white. A yellow third jersey was used in 2004, an orange third jersey was used in 2007, a dark-blue third jersey was used in 2010 and a grey commemorative third jersey was used in 2016. A dark-blue first shirt was used for the 2017–2018 UEFA Europa League qualification campaign.

When Adidas was the kit provider, new kits were launched every even year. Nike, however, releases a new AIK kit every year, before the start of the new season.

Apart from the brand of their kit provider Nike, AIK has the logos of the following sponsors visible on their shirt and shorts: Truecaller a caller-ID app; Svea, a financial group; German automakers Volkswagen; Stadium, a sports retailer, and league sponsors Svenska Spel, a government-owned gambling company (whose logo is mandatory on the right sleeve of the shirts of all Allsvenskan teams).

| Period | Kit manufacturer | Shirt sponsor (chest) |
|---|---|---|
| 1975–77 | (Germany) Adidas | None |
| 1978–80 | (Germany) Puma | None |
| 1981 | (Denmark) Hummel | Eldorado (grocery brand) |
| 1982–84 | (England) Umbro | BPA (technical installation) |
| 1985–88 | (United States) Nike | BPA or Första Sparbanken (banking company) |
| 1989–90 | (Germany) Puma | Folksam (insurance company) |
| 1991 | (Germany) Puma | Folksam or Kombilott (lottery) |
| 1992 | (Germany) Puma | Folksam or Trippellott (lottery) |
| 1995–96 | (Germany) Puma | Scandic (hotel chain) |
| 1997 | (Germany) Puma | Hyundai (automaker) |
| 1998–2016 | (Germany) Adidas | Åbro (brewery) |
| 2017 | (Germany) Adidas | Hjärt-Lungfonden (charity) (Note: Åbro donated the space to Hjärt-Lungfonden (a charitable fundraising organization) the first 20 games of the season.) |
| 2017 | (Germany) Adidas | Åbro |
| 2018–2022 | (United States) Nike | Notar (real-estate agent) |
| 2023– | (United States) Nike | Truecaller (caller-ID app) |

== Stadium ==
Since the 2013 season, AIK play their home games at the Nationalarenan (known for sponsorship reasons as Strawberry Arena since 2024), which also houses the Sweden national team. The decision which arena would replace Råsunda, the club's home up until the 2012 season, was made by a vote of the club's members, held in 2011, which resulted in a large majority favoring Nationalarenan over Tele2 Arena.

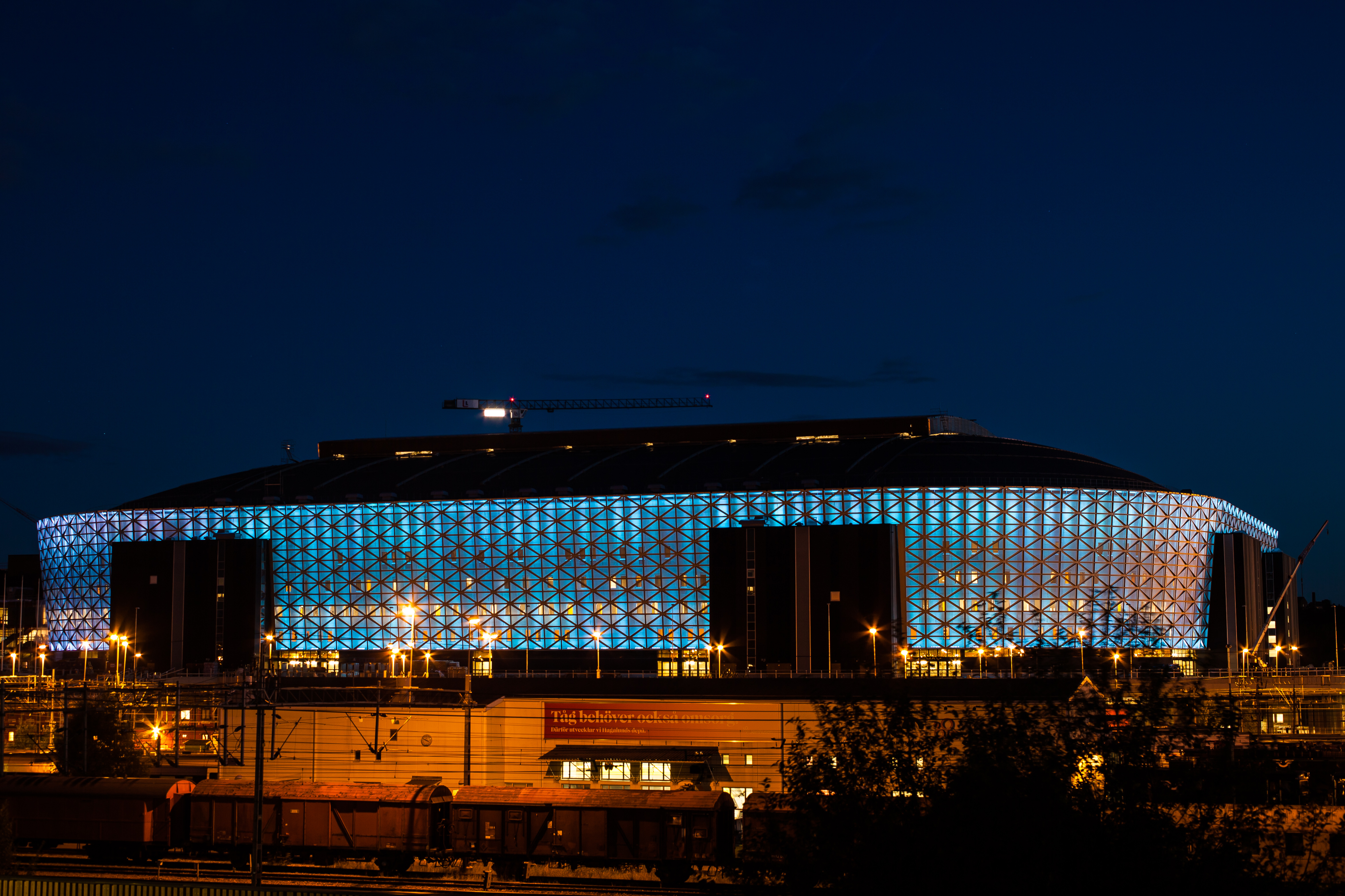
Nationalarenan för fotboll

== Support ==
=== Rivalries ===
AIK's main rival is Djurgården, also formed in 1891 in Stockholm, just three weeks after AIK. Widely considered the fiercest rivalry in Swedish – and arguably also Nordic – football, the fixture between the clubs is known as Tvillingderbyt (the Twin derby). AIK also maintains a strong animosity towards the third major Stockholm side Hammarby. The club's biggest rival outside the Stockholm urban area is IFK Göteborg, followed by Malmö FF.

=== Attendances ===
In 2025, AIK had an average attendance of 30,023, the biggest in Allsvenskan, and in Scandinavia, beating FC Köpenhamns record from 2022/2023. In 2006 AIK had an average attendance of over 21,000, the highest in Sweden that season. In 2007 AIK had an average attendance of over 20,000.

AIK have had the highest average attendance 41 times, the most of all clubs in Sweden of all time, second is city rival IFK Göteborg with 23 times. AIK finished the 2013 season with an average attendance of 18,900, the highest number in Scandinavia. That was also the first season with the new arena. In 2018, AIK broke the record for most sold tickets in an Allsvenskan game in the derby against Hammarby two weeks before the game was played.

=== Club culture ===
The club's entrance music and hymn is "Å vi e AIK" (meaning "Oh we are AIK"), a Swedish-lyric version (written in the 1980s) of a 1971 song, "The Last Farewell", originally performed by its co-writer, the British-Kenyan folk singer Roger Whittaker. The recording that has been used as AIK's entrance music since the mid 00s was released in 2002, an arrangement somewhat closer to Elvis Presley's 1976 cover of the song.

== Players ==
=== First-team squad ===
As of 4 October 2026

Note: Flags indicate national team as defined under FIFA eligibility rules; some limited exceptions apply. Players may hold more than one non-FIFA nationality.

| No. | Pos. | Nation | Player |
|---|---|---|---|
| 2 | MF | NOR | Eskil Edh |
| 3 | DF | BEL | Hervé Matthys |
| 4 | DF | SWE | Sotirios Papagiannopoulos |
| 5 | DF | SWE | Lukas Bergquist |
| 6 | MF | NOR | Martin Ellingsen |
| 7 | MF | SWE | Amel Mujanić |
| 8 | MF | NOR | Johan Hove |
| 9 | FW | SWE | Linus Carlstrand |
| 10 | MF | CHI | Lucas Assadi |
| 12 | DF | SWE | Charlie Pavey |
| 14 | DF | SWE | Fredrik Nissen |
| 15 | GK | SWE | Kristoffer Nordfeldt (captain) |
| 16 | FW | SWE | Sixten Gustafsson |
| 17 | DF | DEN | Mads Thychosen |
| 18 | MF | SWE | Abdihakim Ali |
| 19 | MF | BIH | Dino Beširović |

| No. | Pos. | Nation | Player |
|---|---|---|---|
| 20 | DF | DEN | Sebastian Hausner (on loan from Horsens) |
| 21 | MF | KEN | Stanley Wilson |
| 22 | FW | SWE | Adrián Helm |
| 24 | MF | SWE | Andreas Redkin |
| 25 | DF | CIV | Ibrahim Cissé |
| 28 | MF | SWE | Linus Järeteg |
| 29 | FW | SWE | Kevin Filling |
| 30 | GK | SWE | Kalle Joelsson |
| 33 | DF | FIN | Diogo Tomás |
| 34 | DF | SWE | Wilmer Olofsson |
| 43 | FW | SWE | Nikolaj Staykov |
| 45 | FW | SWE | Taha Ayari |
| 46 | MF | SWE | Yannick Geiger |
| 48 | MF | CIV | Axel Kouame |
| — | MF | SWE | Robin Krügel |
| — | FW | GHA | Nana-Kofi Donkor |

=== Retired numbers ===
- 1 – Supporters of the club

=== Out on loan ===
As of 25 July 2026

Note: Flags indicate national team as defined under FIFA eligibility rules; some limited exceptions apply. Players may hold more than one non-FIFA nationality.

| No. | Pos. | Nation | Player |
|---|---|---|---|
| — | FW | SWE | Aaron Stoch Rydell (at (Sweden) Karlbergs BK until 31 December 2026) |
| — | FW | LBR | Emmanuel Gono (at (Sweden) IK Oddevold until 31 December 2026) |

== Non-playing personnel ==
=== Backroom staff ===
| Position | Name |
|---|---|
| Managing Director | (Sweden) Fredrik Söderberg |
| Finance Director | (Sweden) Håkan Strandlund |
| Head Of Strategy | (England) Jeremy Steele |
| Technical Director | (Sweden) Peter Wennberg |
| Head Of Scouting And Recruitment | (Finland) Miika Takkula |

=== Coaching staff ===
| Position | Staff |
|---|---|
| Head coach | (Spain) José Riveiro |
| Assistant coach | (Sweden) Nils Heingård (Spain) Sergio Almenara |
| Goalkeeping coach | (Canada) Kyriakos Stamatopoulos |
| Fitness coach | (Spain) Michel Bellver (Lithuania) Lukas Sinkunas |

=== Medical staff ===
| Position | Staff |
|---|---|
| Physiotherapist | (Sweden) Victor Lyberg |
| Naprapath | (Sweden) Christian Andersson (Sweden) Mattias Mawloudi |

=== Other ===
| Position | Staff |
|---|---|
| Data analyst | (Germany) Paul Kaminiczny (Portugal) Tiago Santos |
| Equipment manager | (Sweden) Håkan Sjöberg |
| Co-ordinator | (Sweden) Thomas Thudin |
| Security manager | (Sweden) Henrik Koch |

== Coaching history ==
- (England) Fred Spiksley (1911)
- (Austria) Ferdinand Humenberger (1930–32)
- (England) Jimmy Elliott (1932–34)
- (Sweden) Per Kaufeldt (1934–40)
- (Czechoslovakia) Václav Simon (1940–44)
- (Hungary) (Sweden) Istvan Wampetits (1944–48)
- (England) George Raynor (1 July 1948 – 30 June 1952)
- (Sweden) Per Kaufeldt (1951–56)
- (Sweden) Henry Carlsson (1956–58)
- (England) Frank Soo (1958)
- (Sweden) Erik "Lillis" Persson (1959)
- (Hungary) Lajos Szendrödi (1960–61)
- (Sweden) Hilding "Moggli" Gustafsson (1962–64)
- (Sweden) Henry Carlsson (1965–66)
- (Sweden) Ingemar Ingevik (1967–68)
- (Sweden) Torsten Lindberg (1 Jan 1969 – 31 December 1970)
- (Sweden) Jens Lindblom (1971–74)
- (England) Keith Spurgeon (1 Jan 1975 – 31 December 1975)
- (Sweden) Kurt Liander (1975)
- (Sweden) Lars-Oscar Nilsson (1976)
- (Sweden) Gunnar Nordahl (1977–78)
- (Sweden) Olavus Olsson (1978 – Dec 78)
- (Sweden) Jens Lindblom (1979)
- (Sweden) Bo Petersson (1979–80)
- (Sweden) Rolf Zetterlund (1 Jan 1981 – 31 December 1986)
- (Sweden) Göran Åberg (1987)
- (Sweden) Nisse Andersson (1 July 1987–87)
- (Sweden) Sanny Åslund (1988–90)
- (Sweden) Tommy Söderberg (1991–93)
- (Sweden) Hans Backe (1 Jan 1994 – 30 June 1995)
- (Sweden) Erik Hamrén (1 Jan 1995 – 31 December 1997)
- (Scotland) Stuart Baxter (1 Jan 1998 – Dec 2000)
- (Sweden) Olle Nordin (2001–02)
- (Sweden) Peter Larsson (2002)
- (Czech Republic) Dušan Uhrin (1 July 2002 – 31 October 2002)
- (England) Richard Money (1 Jan 2003 – 19 April 2004)
- (Sweden) Patrick Englund (2004)
- (Sweden) Rikard Norling (Jan 2005 – Nov 2008)
- (Sweden) Mikael Stahre (1 Jan 2009 – 24 April 2010)
- (Sweden) Björn Wesström (interim) (26 April 2010 – 22 June 2010)
- (Scotland) Alex Miller (22 June 2010 – 10 November 2010)
- (Sweden) Andreas Alm (1 Jan 2011 – 13 May 2016)
- (Sweden) Rikard Norling (13 May 2016 – 27 July 2020)
- (Poland) (Sweden) Bartosz Grzelak (31 July 2020 – 19 August 2022)
- (Eritrea) Henok Goitom (interim) (19 August 2022 – 8 November 2022)
- (Sweden) Andreas Brännström (8 November 2022 – 2 July 2023)
- (Norway) Henning Berg (2 July 2023 – 14 June 2024)
- (Eritrea) Henok Goitom (interim) (18 June 2024 – 16 July 2024)
- (Faroe Islands) Mikkjal Thomassen (16 July 2024 – 4 January 2026)
- (Spain) José Riveiro (16 January 2026 – )

== Honours ==
- Swedish Champions (Note: The title of "Swedish Champions" has been awarded to the winner of four different competitions over the years. Between 1896 and 1925 the title was awarded to the winner of Svenska Mästerskapet, a stand-alone cup tournament. No club were given the title between 1926 and 1930 even though the first-tier league Allsvenskan was played. In 1931 the title was reinstated and awarded to the winner of Allsvenskan. Between 1982 and 1990 a play-off in cup format was held at the end of the league season to decide the champions. After the play-off format in 1991 and 1992 the title was decided by the winner of Mästerskapsserien, an additional league after the end of Allsvenskan. Since the 1993 season the title has once again been awarded to the winner of Allsvenskan.)
  - Winners (12): 1900, 1901, 1911, 1914, 1916, 1923, 1931–32, 1936–37, 1992, 1998, 2009, 2018

=== League ===
- Allsvenskan:
  - Champions (6): 1931–32, 1936–37, 1983, 1998, 2009, 2018
  - Runners-up (15): 1930–31, 1934–35, 1935–36, 1938–39, 1946–47, 1972, 1974, 1984, 1999, 2006, 2011, 2013, 2016, 2017, 2021
- Superettan:
  - Winners: 2005
- Mästerskapsserien:
  - Winners: 1992
- Svenska Serien:
  - Runners-up (5): 1910, 1914–15, 1915–16, 1922–23, 1923–24

=== Cups ===
- Svenska Cupen
  - Winners (8): 1949, 1950, 1975–76, 1984–1985, 1995–96, 1996–97, 1998–99, 2009
  - Runners-up (8): 1943, 1947, 1968–69, 1991, 1994–95, 1999–2000, 2000–01, 2002
- Svenska Mästerskapet
  - Winners (6): 1900, 1901, 1911, 1914, 1916, 1923
  - Runners-up: 1898, 1917
- Allsvenskan play-offs
  - Runners-up: 1986
- Svenska Supercupen
  - Winners: 2010
  - Runners-up: 2012
- Corinthian Bowl
  - Runners-up: 1912, 1913
- Rosenska Pokalen
  - Runners-up: 1899, 1900
- Wicanderska Välgörenhetsskölden
  - Winners: 1908, 1909, 1914, 1916
  - Runners-up: 1905, 1906, 1915

=== Invitational ===
- Tournoi de Pentecôte de Paris:
  - Winners (1): 1921
- Singapore Community Shield:
  - Winners (1): 2010

== AIK in Europe ==
=== European games ===
| Season | Competition | Round | Country | Club | Home | Away | Agg. | Notes |
|---|---|---|---|---|---|---|---|---|
| 1964–65 | International Football Cup | Group C2 | (France) | Angers | 4–1 | 1–3 | | Placed 2nd |
| 1964–65 | International Football Cup | Group C2 | (Socialist Federal Republic of Yugoslavia) | Sarajevo | 2–0 | 0–2 | | Placed 2nd |
| 1964–65 | International Football Cup | Group C2 | (Czechoslovakia) | Slovnaft Bratislava | 3–2 | 1–7 | | Placed 2nd |
| 1965–66 | Inter-Cities Fairs Cup | First round | (Belgium) | Bruxelles | 0–0 | 3–1 | 3–1 | |
| 1965–66 | Inter-Cities Fairs Cup | Second round | (Switzerland) | Servette | 2–1 | 1–4 | 3–5 | |
| 1966–67 | International Football Cup | Group B3 | (East Germany) | Carl Zeiss Jena | 0–0 | 1–4 | | Placed 4th |
| 1966–67 | International Football Cup | Group B3 | (West Germany) | Eintracht Braunschweig | 3–1 | 0–1 | | Placed 4th |
| 1966–67 | International Football Cup | Group B3 | (Poland) | Górnik Zabrze | 1–1 | 2–3 | | Placed 4th |
| 1967 | International Football Cup | Group B6 | (Denmark) | AGF | 1–0 | 2–1 | | Placed 3rd |
| 1967 | International Football Cup | Group B6 | (East Germany) | Dynamo Dresden | 1–4 | 2–1 | | Placed 3rd |
| 1967 | International Football Cup | Group B6 | (Czechoslovakia) | Košice | 1–1 | 0–4 | | Placed 3rd |
| 1968–69 | Inter-Cities Fairs Cup | First round | (Norway) | Skeid | 2–1 | 1–1 | 3–2 | |
| 1968–69 | Inter-Cities Fairs Cup | Second round | (West Germany) | Hannover 96 | 4–2 | 2–5 | 6–7 | |
| 1970 | International Football Cup | Group B3 | (Switzerland) | Lausanne Sports | 1–1 | 2–2 | | Placed 3rd |
| 1970 | International Football Cup | Group B3 | (France) | Marseille | 2–2 | 2–6 | | Placed 3rd |
| 1970 | International Football Cup | Group B3 | (Poland) | Zagłębie Sosnowiec | 2–1 | 1–2 | | Placed 3rd |
| 1973 | International Football Cup | Group 2 | (West Germany) | Duisburg | 3–1 | 1–1 | | Placed 3rd |
| 1973 | International Football Cup | Group 2 | (Netherlands) | PSV | 0–1 | 0–3 | | Placed 3rd |
| 1973 | International Football Cup | Group 2 | (Czechoslovakia) | Slovan Bratislava | 1–1 | 0–0 | | Placed 3rd |
| 1973–74 | UEFA Cup | First round | (Denmark) | B 1903 | 1–1 | 1–2 | 2–3 | |
| 1974 | International Football Cup | Group 6 | (Austria) | Linz | 3–2 | 1–6 | | Placed 4th |
| 1974 | International Football Cup | Group 6 | (Czechoslovakia) | Spartak Trnava | 0–1 | 1–2 | | Placed 4th |
| 1974 | International Football Cup | Group 6 | (Poland) | Wisła Kraków | 0–3 | 0–1 | | Placed 4th |
| 1975 | International Football Cup | Group 5 | (West Germany) | Tennis Borussia Berlin | 2–3 | 3–1 | | Placed 4th |
| 1975 | International Football Cup | Group 5 | (Poland) | Polonia Bytom | 0–2 | 1–5 | | Placed 4th |
| 1975 | International Football Cup | Group 5 | (Czechoslovakia) | Zbrojovka Brno | 1–2 | 0–2 | | Placed 4th |
| 1975–76 | UEFA Cup | First round | (Soviet Union) | Spartak Moscow | 1–1 | 0–1 | 1–2 | |
| 1976 | International Football Cup | Group 4 | (Czechoslovakia) | Baník Ostrava | 0–1 | 0–2 | | Placed 4th |
| 1976 | International Football Cup | Group 4 | (West Germany) | Eintracht Braunschweig | 1–3 | 1–2 | | Placed 4th |
| 1976 | International Football Cup | Group 4 | (Austria) | Tirol Innsbruck | 3–3 | 1–3 | | Placed 4th |
| 1976–77 | European Cup Winners' Cup | First round | (Turkey) | Galatasaray | 1–2 | 1–1 | 2–3 | |
| 1984 | International Football Cup | Group 5 | (Poland) | Górnik Zabrze | 2–3 | 0–1 | | Placed 1st |
| 1984 | International Football Cup | Group 5 | (East Germany) | Magdeburg | 2–0 | 2–0 | | Placed 1st |
| 1984 | International Football Cup | Group 5 | (West Germany) | Nürnberg | 8–2 | 2–1 | | Placed 1st |
| 1984–85 | UEFA Cup | First round | (Scotland) | Dundee United | 1–0 | 0–3 | 1–3 | |
| 1985 | International Football Cup | Group 4 | (Czechoslovakia) | Bohemians Praha | 2–1 | 1–1 | | Placed 1st |
| 1985 | International Football Cup | Group 4 | (Switzerland) | St. Gallen | 0–1 | 6–1 | | Placed 1st |
| 1985 | International Football Cup | Group 4 | (Hungary) | Videoton | 3–0 | 0–1 | | Placed 1st |
| 1985–86 | European Cup Winners' Cup | First round | (Luxembourg) | Red Boys Differdange | 8–0 | 5–0 | 13–0 | |
| 1985–86 | European Cup Winners' Cup | Second round | (Czechoslovakia) | Dukla Prague | 2–2 | 0–1 | 2–3 | |
| 1987 | International Football Cup | Group 6 | (Poland) | Lech Poznań | 4–1 | 0–0 | | Placed 1st |
| 1987 | International Football Cup | Group 6 | (Denmark) | Lyngby | 3–1 | 2–0 | | Placed 1st |
| 1987 | International Football Cup | Group 6 | (Czechoslovakia) | Plastika Nitra | 0–0 | 0–1 | | Placed 1st |
| 1987–88 | UEFA Cup | First round | (Czechoslovakia) | Vítkovice | 0–2 | 1–1 | 1–3 | |
| 1993–94 | UEFA Champions League | First round | (Czechoslovakia) | Sparta Prague | 1–0 | 0–2 | 1–2 | |
| 1994 | International Football Cup | Group 3 | (Germany) | Bayer Leverkusen | 3–2 | | | Placed 1st |
| 1994 | International Football Cup | Group 3 | (Switzerland) | Lausanne Sports | 2–1 | | | Placed 1st |
| 1994 | International Football Cup | Group 3 | (Netherlands) | Sparta Rotterdam | 2–2 | | | Placed 1st |
| 1994 | International Football Cup | Group 3 | (Austria) | Tirol Innsbruck | 2–0 | | | Placed 1st |
| 1994–95 | UEFA Cup | Prel. round | (Lithuania) | ROMAR Mažeikiai | 2–0 | 2–0 | 4–0 | |
| 1994–95 | UEFA Cup | First round | (Czech Republic) | Slavia Prague | 0–0 | 2–2 | 2–2 | Away goal |
| 1994–95 | UEFA Cup | Second round | (Italy) | Parma | 0–1 | 0–2 | 0–3 | |
| 1996–97 | UEFA Cup Winners' Cup | First round | (Iceland) | KR | 1–1 | 1–0 | 2–1 | |
| 1996–97 | UEFA Cup Winners' Cup | Second round | (France) | Nîmes Olympique | 0–1 | 3–1 | 3–2 | |
| 1996–97 | UEFA Cup Winners' Cup | Quarter-final | (Spain) | Barcelona | 1–1 | 1–3 | 2–4 | |
| 1997–98 | UEFA Cup Winners' Cup | First round | (Slovenia) | Primorje | 0–1 | 1–1 | 1–2 | |
| 1999–00 | UEFA Champions League | Second round | (Belarus) | Dnepr-Transmash Mogilev | 2–0 | 1–0 | 3–0 | |
| 1999–00 | UEFA Champions League | Third round | (Greece) | AEK Athens | 1–0 | 0–0 | 1–0 | |
| 1999–00 | UEFA Champions League | Group B | (England) | Arsenal | 2–3 | 1–3 | | Placed 4th |
| 1999–00 | UEFA Champions League | Group B | (Spain) | Barcelona | 1–2 | 0–5 | | Placed 4th |
| 1999–00 | UEFA Champions League | Group B | (Italy) | Fiorentina | 0–0 | 0–3 | | Placed 4th |
| 2000–01 | UEFA Cup | Qual. round | (Belarus) | Gomel | 1–0 | 2–0 | 3–0 | |
| 2000–01 | UEFA Cup | First round | (Denmark) | Herfølge | 0–1 | 1–1 | 1–2 | |
| 2001 | UEFA Intertoto Cup | First round | (Wales) | Carmarthen Town | 3–0 | 0–0 | 3–0 | |
| 2001 | UEFA Intertoto Cup | Second round | (Denmark) | OB | 2–0 | 2–2 | 4–2 | |
| 2001 | UEFA Intertoto Cup | Third round | (France) | Troyes | 1–2 | 1–2 | 2–4 | |
| 2002–03 | UEFA Cup | Qual. round | (Iceland) | ÍBV | 2–0 | 3–1 | 5–1 | |
| 2002–03 | UEFA Cup | First round | (Turkey) | Fenerbahçe | 3–3 | 1–3 | 4–6 | |
| 2003–04 | UEFA Cup | Qual. round | (Iceland) | Fylkir | 1–0 | 0–0 | 1–0 | |
| 2003–04 | UEFA Cup | First round | (Spain) | Valencia | 0–1 | 0–1 | 0–2 | |
| 2007–08 | UEFA Cup | First qual. round | (Northern Ireland) | Glentoran | 4–0 | 5–0 | 9–0 | |
| 2007–08 | UEFA Cup | Second qual. round | (Latvia) | Liepājas Metalurgs | 2–0 | 2–3 | 4–3 | |
| 2007–08 | UEFA Cup | First round | (Israel) | Hapoel Tel Aviv | 0–1 | 0–0 | 0–1 | |
| 2010–11 | UEFA Champions League | Second qual. round | (Luxembourg) | Jeunesse Esch | 1–0 | 0–0 | 1–0 | |
| 2010–11 | UEFA Champions League | Third qual. round | (Norway) | Rosenborg | 0–1 | 0–3 | 0–4 | |
| 2010–11 | UEFA Europa League | Play-off round | (Bulgaria) | Levski Sofia | 0–0 | 1–2 | 1–2 | |
| 2012–13 | UEFA Europa League | Second qual. round | (Iceland) | FH | 1–1 | 1–0 | 2–1 | |
| 2012–13 | UEFA Europa League | Third qual. round | (Poland) | Lech Poznań | 3–0 | 0–1 | 3–1 | |
| 2012–13 | UEFA Europa League | Play-off round | (Russia) | CSKA | 0–1 | 2–0 | 2–1 | |
| 2012–13 | UEFA Europa League | Group F | (Ukraine) | Dnipro | 2–3 | 0–4 | | Placed 4th |
| 2012–13 | UEFA Europa League | Group F | (Italy) | Napoli | 1–2 | 0–4 | | Placed 4th |
| 2012–13 | UEFA Europa League | Group F | (Netherlands) | PSV | 1–0 | 1–1 | | Placed 4th |
| 2014–15 | UEFA Europa League | Second qual. round | (Northern Ireland) | Linfield | 2–0 | 0–1 | 2–1 | |
| 2014–15 | UEFA Europa League | Third qual. round | (Kazakhstan) | Astana | 0–3 | 1–1 | 1–4 | |
| 2015–16 | UEFA Europa League | First qual. round | (Finland) | VPS | 4–0 | 2–2 | 6–2 | |
| 2015–16 | UEFA Europa League | Second qual. round | (Armenia) | Shirak | 2–0 | 2–0 | 4–0 | |
| 2015–16 | UEFA Europa League | Third qual. round | (Greece) | Atromitos | 1–3 | 0–1 | 1–4 | |
| 2016–17 | UEFA Europa League | First qual. round | (Wales) | Bala Town | 2–0 | 2–0 | 4–0 | |
| 2016–17 | UEFA Europa League | Second qual. round | (Gibraltar) | Europa FC | 1–0 | 1–0 | 2–0 | |
| 2016–17 | UEFA Europa League | Third qual. round | (Greece) | Panathinaikos | 0–1 | 0–2 | 0–3 | |
| 2017–18 | UEFA Europa League | First qual. round | (Faroe Islands) | KÍ | 0–0 | 5–0 | 5–0 | |
| 2017–18 | UEFA Europa League | Second qual. round | (Bosnia and Herzegovina) | Željezničar | 2–0 | 0–0 | 2–0 | |
| 2017–18 | UEFA Europa League | Third qual. round | (Portugal) | Braga | 1–1 | 1–2 (a.e.t.) | 2–3 | |
| 2018–19 | UEFA Europa League | First qual. round | (Republic of Ireland) | Shamrock Rovers | 1–1 | 1–0 | 2–1 | |
| 2018–19 | UEFA Europa League | Second qual. round | (Denmark) | Nordsjælland | 0–1 | 0–1 | 0–2 | |
| 2019–20 | UEFA Champions League | First qual. round | (Armenia) | Ararat-Armenia | 3–1 | 1–2 | 4–3 | |
| 2019–20 | UEFA Champions League | Second qual. round | (Slovenia) | Maribor | 3–2 (a.e.t.) | 1–2 | 4–4 (a) | |
| 2019–20 | UEFA Europa League | Third qual. round | (Moldova) | Sheriff | 1–1 | 2–1 | 3–2 | |
| 2019–20 | UEFA Europa League | Play-off round | (Scotland) | Celtic | 1–4 | 0–2 | 1–6 | |
| 2022–23 | UEFA Europa Conference League | Second qual. round | (Ukraine) | Vorskla Poltava | 2–0 (a.e.t.) | 2–3 | 4–3 | |
| 2022–23 | UEFA Europa Conference League | Third qual. round | (North Macedonia) | Shkëndija | 1–1 | 1–1 (a.e.t.) | 2–2 (3–2 p) | |
| 2022–23 | UEFA Europa Conference League | Play-off round | (Czech Republic) | Slovácko | 0–1 | 0–3 | 0–4 | |
| 2025–26 | UEFA Conference League | Second qual. round | (Estonia) | Paide Linnameeskond | 6–0 | 2–0 | 8–0 | |
| 2025–26 | UEFA Conference League | Third qual. round | (Hungary) | Győr | 2–1 | 0–2 | 2–3 | |

=== UEFA Team rank ===
The following list ranks the current position of AIK in UEFA ranking:

| Rank | Team | Points |
|---|---|---|
| 280 | (Luxembourg) CS Fola Esch | 5.000 |
| 281 | (Cyprus) Aris Limassol | 4.945 |
| 282 | (Cyprus) AEL Limassol | 4.945 |
| 283 | (Sweden) Kalmar FF | 4.875 |
| 284 | (Sweden) AIK | 4.875 |
| 285 | (Sweden) IFK Göteborg | 4.875 |
| 286 | (Ukraine) FC Kryvbas Kryvyi Rih | 4.680 |
| 287 | (Ukraine) FC Polissya Zhytomyr | 4.680 |
| 288 | (Ukraine) Vorskla Poltava | 4.680 |

As of 25 December 2024. Club coefficients | UEFA Coefficients
