= Rolf Maartmann =

Norwegian footballer (1887-1941)

Rolf Maartmann (3 November 1887 – 8 July 1941) was a Norwegian football player. He was born in Kristiania. He played for the club Lyn, and also for the Norwegian national team. He competed at the 1912 Summer Olympics in Stockholm. He was Norwegian champion with Lyn in 1908, 1909, 1910 and 1911. He was the twin brother of Erling Maartmann.
