= Jacob Levin (footballer) =

Swedish footballer

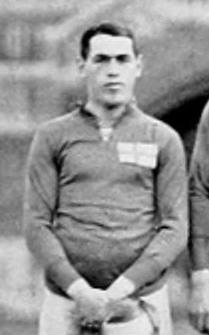
- Lewin in 1912

Personal information
- Date of birth: 22 November 1890
- Place of birth: Landskrona, Sweden
- Date of death: 10 December 1945 (aged 55)
- Place of death: Liverpool, England
- Position: Defender

Senior career*
Years	Team	Apps	(Gls)
1907–1912	Örgryte IS		
1913	Everton F.C.		

International career
1910–92	Sweden	6	(0)
- * Club domestic league appearances and goals

Jacob Levin (also known as Jacob Lewin; 22 November 1890 – 10 December 1945) was a Swedish amateur football player who competed in the 1912 Summer Olympics. He played as defender in one match of the main tournament against the Netherlands. In 1913, he joined Everton F.C., he played in two games for the Liverpool-based club in "A" team games against West Lancashire Football League team Southport Park Villa and Marine F.C.
