= Gustaf Ekberg =

Swedish footballer

Senior career*
Years	Team	Apps	(Gls)
- Djurgården
- * Club domestic league appearances and goals

Gustaf Ekberg is a Swedish retired footballer. Ekberg made 18 Svenska Serien appearances for Djurgården and scored 1 goals.
