= Knut Nilsson =

Swedish footballer and bandy player

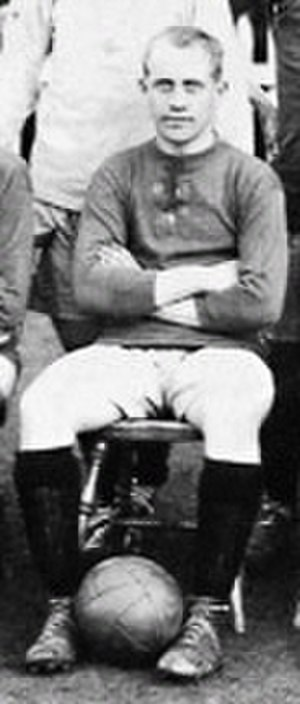
Nilsson (1914)

Knut "Knutte" Nilsson (March 22, 1887 – ?) was a Swedish amateur football and bandy player. He competed in the 1912 Summer Olympics. He was a member of the Swedish Olympic squad. He did not play in a match, but was a reserve player.
