= Ivar Svensson =

Swedish footballer

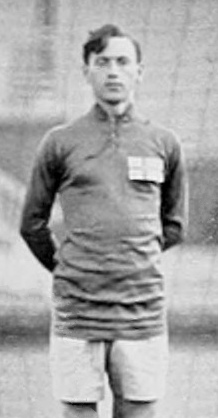
- Ivar Svensson at the 1912 Olympics

Personal information
- Born: 7 November 1893 Norrköping, Östergötland, Sweden
- Died: 18 June 1934 (aged 40) Värmdö, Stockholm, Sweden

Sport
- Sport: Football
- Club: IFK Norrköping

Ivar Samuel "Iffa-Sven" Svensson (sometimes spelled Iwar Swensson; 7 November 1893 – 18 June 1934) was a Swedish football (soccer) player who competed in the 1912 Summer Olympics. He played as forward one match in the main tournament as well as one match in the consolation tournament. He scored two goals in the main tournament.
