= Råsunda IP =

Football stadium in Solna, Sweden

Coordinates: 59°21′45.87″N 17°59′46.71″E

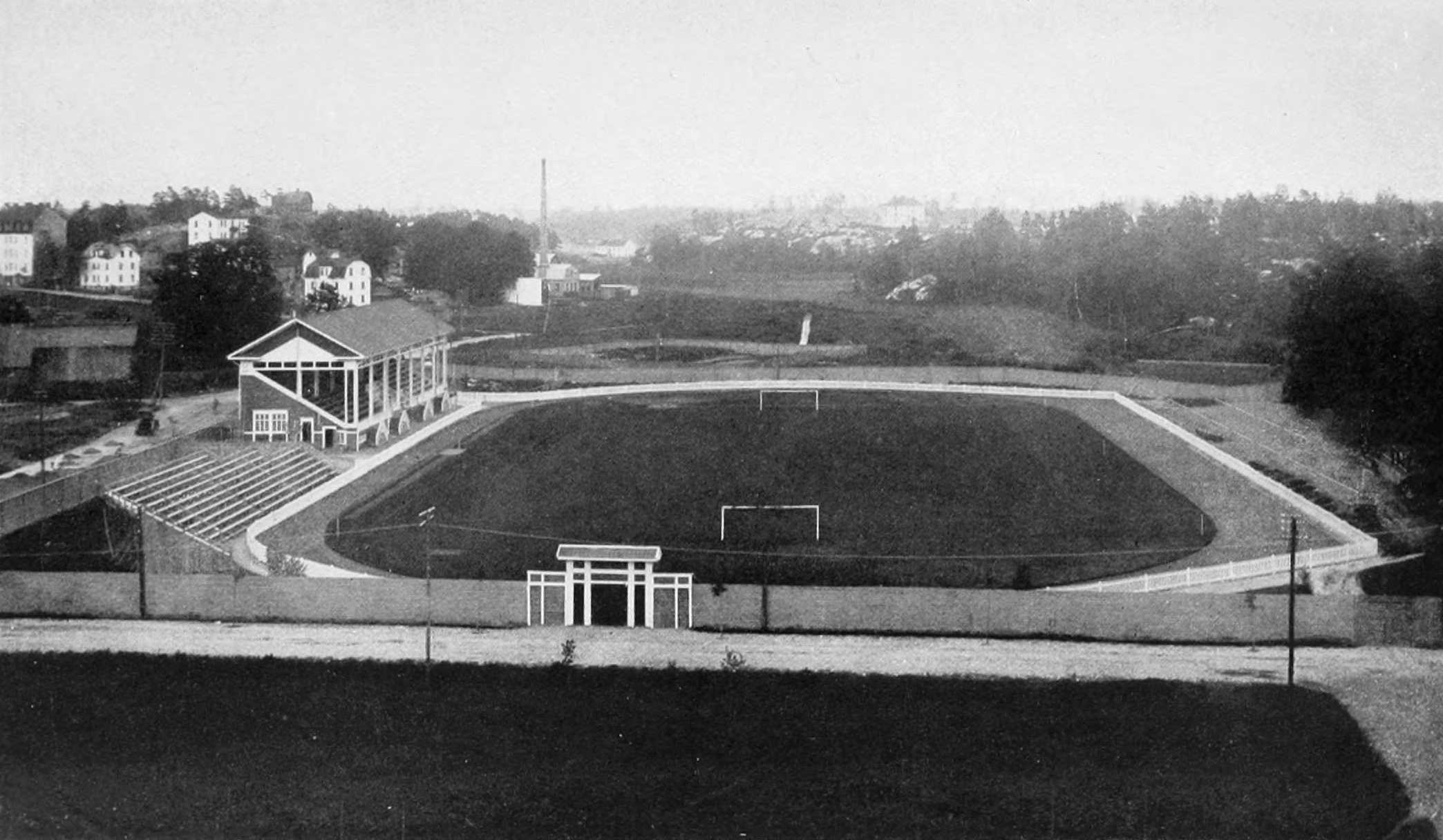
- Råsunda IP in 1912
- Interactive map of Råsunda IP
- Location: Solna, Sweden
- Type: sports ground

Construction
- Opened: 18 September 1910
- Demolished: 1937

Tenant
- AIK

Råsunda IP (Swedish pronunciation: [ˈrôːˌsɵnːda]) was a football stadium in Solna, Sweden and the former home stadium for the football team AIK between 1910 and 1912. It was founded in 1910 and was demolished in 1937 when Råsunda Stadium was built on the existing site of the stadium.

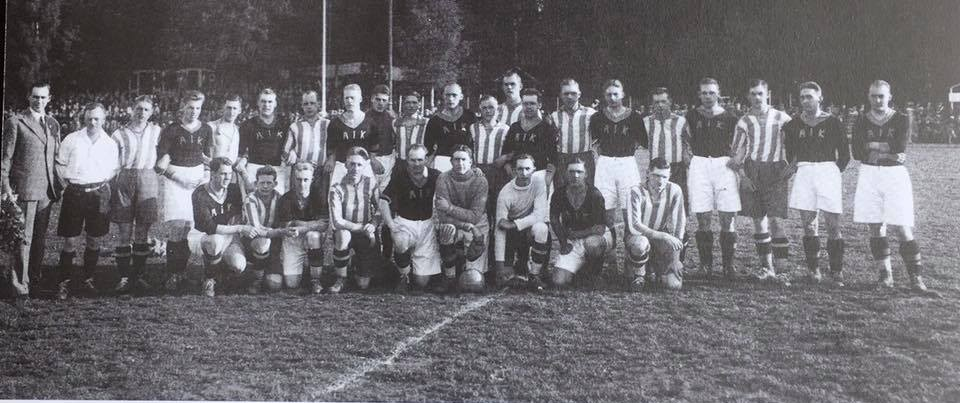
