= Djurgårdens IF Fotboll league record by opponent =

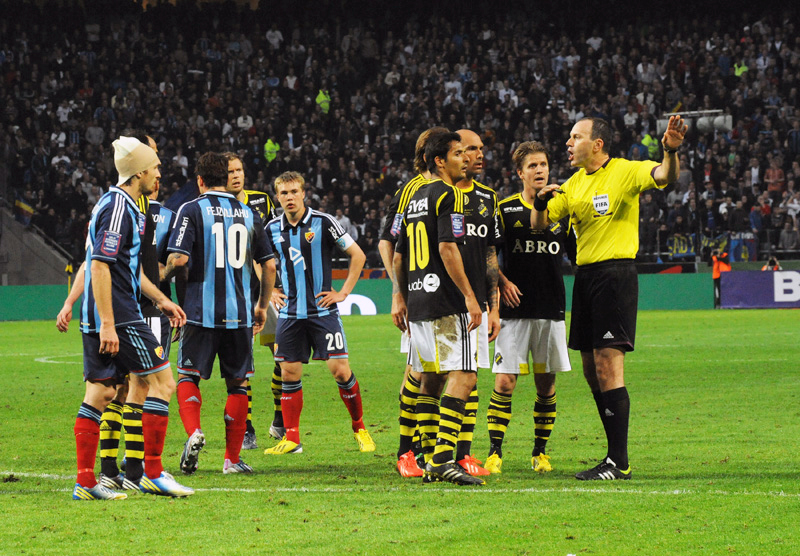
Djurgårdens IF (drak and light blue striped shirts) take on AIK (black shirts) in 2013.

Djurgårdens IF is a Swedish professional association football club based in Stockholm. The club was formed on Djurgården in 1891 and took up football in 1899. Djurgårdens IF played its first league match on 6 July 1902, a 3–0 win against AIK. Djurgården first won promotion to the Allsvenskan in 1927–28 season.

The team competes in Allsvenskan as of the 2015 season; this is Djurgårdens IF's 15th consecutive season in the top flight, and their 60th overall. Djurgårdens IF's first team has competed in a number of leagues, and its record against each club faced in these competitions is listed below. The team that Djurgårdens IF have met the most times in league competition are AIK, from Solna, against whom Djurgårdens IF have contested 143 league matches.

== Key ==
- The list includes matches from Svenska Bollspelsförbundets serie (in 1902), Svenska Bollspelsförbundets tävlingsserie klass 1 (in 1905), Stockholmsserien Klass 1 (from 1906 to 1910), Svenska Serien (from 1911–12 to 1916–17 and in 1920–21), Fyrkantsserien (from 1918 to 1919), Svenska Serien Östra (from 1922–23 to 1923–24), Division 2 Östsvenska (from 1924–25 to 1926–27), Allsvenskan (in 1927–28, in 1936–37, from 1945–46 to 1947–48, 1949-50 to 1960, from 1962 to 1981, in 1986, from 1988 to 1992, from 1995 to 1996, in 1999, and from 2001 to present day), Division 2 Norra (in 1928–29, from 1937–38 to 1944–45 and from 1982 to 1985), Division 2 Östra (from 1932–33 to 1935–36), Division 2 Nordöstra (from 1948–49), Division 2 Svealand (in 1961), Division 1 Norra (in 1987, from 1993 to 1994 and from 1997 to 1998), Superettan (in 2000)
- These statistics do not include results from the Allsvenskan play-offs (held between 1982 and 1990), but those from Mästerskapsserien and Kvalsvenskan (held in 1991 and 1992) are included. The Allsvenskan play-off round was held in cup format at the end of the league season to decide the national champions, while Mästerskapsserien was an additional league stage with the same purpose.
- The name used for each opponent is the name they had when Djurgårdens IF most recently played a league match against them. Results against each opponent include results against that club under any former name. For example, results against Ljungskile SK include matches played against Panos Ljungskile SK (1997–02).
- The columns headed "First" and "Last" contain the first and most recent seasons in which Djurgårdens IF played league matches against each opponent.
- The counting starts from when Djurgårdens IF started to play at the national league level. Some results from the 1942–43 season and before are missing and therefore for the teams involved in those cases only the total number of matches are shown.

== All-time league record ==
Statistics correct as of matches played on 1 November 2015.

Team	Pld	W	D	L	GF	GA	GD	Win%	First	Last
AIK	145	44	50	51	200	204	−4	30.3	1902	2015
AIK 2	3								1902	1910
Årsta SK	6								1931–32	1935–36
Assyriska FF	10	9	1	0	23	3	+20	90.0	1993	2005
Åtvidabergs FF	50								1932–33	2015
Avesta AIK	4	2	0	2	14	7	+7	50.0	1944–45	1961
Billingsfors IK	2	1	1	0	3	1	+2	50.0	1946–47	1946–47
BK Derby	12								1926–27	1977
BK Forward	2	1	0	1	6	2	+4	50.0	1987	1987
BK Häcken	22	9	4	9	26	32	−6	40.9	1992	2015
Bollnäs GIF	4								1937–38	1938–39
Brynäs IF	2	2	0	0	7	0	+7	100.0	1974	1974
Degerfors IF	42	23	11	8	85	51	+34	54.8	1945–46	1998
Enköpings SK	16								1929–30	2003
Eriksdals IF	6								1907	1910
Falkenbergs FF	4	3	0	1	6	2	+4	75.0	2014	2015
Falu BS	2	2	0	0	11	2	+9	100.0	1985	1985
FC Café Opera Djursholm	2	2	0	0	6	2	+4	100.0	2000	2000
Flens IF	2	2	0	0	9	2	+7	100.0	1982	1982
GAIS	79	33	15	31	149	119	+30	41.8	1915–16	2012
Gårda BK	2	1	0	1	6	3	+3	50.0	1936–37	1936–37
Gefle IF	54								1928–29	2015
GIF Sundsvall	34	21	6	7	72	38	+34	61.8	1965	2015
Göteborgs FF	2	0	1	1	2	4	−2	0.0	1911–12	1911–12
Gunnilse IS	2	2	0	0	10	1	+9	100.0	2000	2000
Hagalunds IF	8								1930–31	1943–44
Hallstahammar SK	8								1928–29	1961
Halmstads BK	77	35	22	20	118	94	+24	45.5	1945–46	2015
Hammarby IF	108	47	23	38	170	155	+15	43.5	1920–21	2015
Helsingborgs IF	85	32	22	31	150	157	−7	37.6	1916–17	2015
Hofors AIF	6								1940–41	1942–43
Högadals IS	2	2	0	0	6	1	+5	100.0	1962	1962
Huvudsta IS	8								1926–27	1931–32
IF Brommapojkarna	24	14	5	5	48	23	+25	58.3	1983	2014
IF Elfsborg	92	28	24	40	137	139	−2	30.4	1927–28	2015
IF Linnéa	6								1924–25	1926–27
IF Norden	4								1929–30	1930–31
IF Olympia	2								1929–30	1929–30
IF Saab	2	2	0	0	7	0	+7	100.0	1973	1973
IF Sleipner	1	1	0	0	9	0	+9	100.0	1902	1902
IF Swithiod	1	1	0	0	2	1	+1	100.0	1902	1902
IF Sylvia	2	1	0	1	6	6	+0	50.0	2000	2000
IFK Eskilstuna	25	12	7	6	66	39	+27	48.0	1911–12	1964
IFK Göteborg	126	44	28	54	191	211	−20	34.9	1911–12	2015
IFK Grängesberg	4								1937–38	1938–39
IFK Holmsund	2	2	0	0	11	3	+8	100.0	1967	1967
IFK Lidingö	2								1941–42	1941–42
IFK Luleå	14	7	5	2	22	11	+11	50.0	1971	1998
IFK Malmö	15	12	2	1	48	20	+28	80.0	1920–21	1962
IFK Mora	2	2	0	0	5	2	+3	100.0	1987	1987
IFK Norrköping	134								1911–12	2015
IFK Nyköping	2								1924–25	1924–25
IFK Stockholm	28								1905	1961
IFK Sundsvall	20	13	4	3	50	23	+27	65.0	1961	1993
IFK Sunne	2	2	0	0	14	1	+13	100.0	1961	1961
IFK Uppsala	14								1905	1913–14
IFK Västerås	16								1928–29	1987
IK Brage	32								1941–42	2000
IK City	6								1928–29	1961
IK Oddevold	2	2	0	0	4	2	+2	100.0	1996	1996
IK Sirius	18								1924–25	1998
IK Sleipner	12								1922–23	1948–49
IS Halmia	12	5	1	6	19	18	+1	41.7	1945–46	1979
Jönköpings Södra IF	18	11	2	5	37	18	+19	61.1	1945–46	1969
Kalmar FF	54								1934–35	2015
Karlskoga IF	2	2	0	0	6	1	+5	100.0	1948–49	1948–49
Karlslunds IF	6	5	1	0	10	1	+9	83.3	1983	1985
Karlstads BK (Note: Record against Karlstads BIK included.)	6	4	2	0	15	1	+14	66.7	1961	1987
Kiruna FF	2	2	0	0	8	1	+7	100.0	1994	1994
Köpings IS	2	2	0	0	14	2	+12	100.0	1961	1961
Kronobergs IK	6								1929–30	1931–32
Landskrona BoIS	34	13	9	12	58	43	+15	38.2	1927–28	2005
Lira Luleå BK	2	2	0	0	7	2	+5	100.0	1997	1997
Ljungskile SK (Note: Record against Panos Ljungskile SK included.)	4	3	0	1	7	4	+3	75.0	2000	2008
Ljusne AIK	12								1937–38	1944–45
Ludvika FK (Note: Record against Ludvika FfI included.)	16								1938–39	1998
Malmö FF	123	40	31	52	156	191	−35	32.5	1936–37	2015
Mariebergs IK	17								1906	1926–27
Mjällby AIF	14	5	1	8	16	22	−6	35.7	1980	2014
Mjölby AIF	8								1932–33	1935–36
Motala AIF	7								1932–33	1957–58
Nacka FF	4	2	1	1	14	6	+8	50.0	1997	1998
Norrby IF	2	2	0	0	4	2	+2	100.0	1955–56	1955–56
Norrmalms IK	1	1	0	0	13	0	+13	100.0	1902	1902
Nyköpings BIS	2	0	2	0	1	1	+0	0.0	1984	1984
Nyköpings BK	6								1929–30	1931–32
Nynäshamns IF	4								1939–40	1940–41
Ope IF	8	6	1	1	23	10	+13	75.0	1982	1993
Örebro SK	94	45	21	28	147	109	+38	47.9	1946–47	2015
Örgryte IS	82	32	23	27	122	131	−9	39.0	1911–12	2009
Örtakoloniens IF	2	2	0	0	9	3	+6	100.0	1943–44	1943–44
Östermalms IF	6								1905	1908
Östermalms SK	1	1	0	0	4	0	+4	100.0	1902	1902
Östers IF	50	22	14	14	87	73	+14	44.0	1968	2013
Piteå IF	2	2	0	0	4	1	+3	100.0	1998	1998
Råå IF	4	1	1	2	3	5	−2	25.0	1950–51	1951–52
Reymersholms IK	32								1924–25	1948–49
Sandvikens AIK	16								1939–40	1954–55
Sandvikens IF	29								1928–29	1985
SK Sifhälla	2	1	1	0	6	2	+4	50.0	1961	1961
Skärblacka IF	2								1935–36	1935–36
Skellefteå AIK	4	2	1	1	7	3	+4	50.0	1984	1987
Skutskärs IF	2								1937–38	1937–38
Södertälje IF	2								1924–25	1924–25
Södertälje SK	4								1929–30	1930–31
Spånga IS	4	4	0	0	14	2	+12	100.0	1993	1994
Spårvägens FF	8	2	6	0	15	9	+6	25.0	1993	1998
Stattena IF	2	1	0	1	4	5	−1	50.0	1927–28	1927–28
Stockholms BK	6								1924–25	1926–27
Sundbybergs IK	30								1924–25	1961
Surahammars IF	6								1928–29	1948–49
Syrianska FC	6	2	3	1	8	4	+4	33.3	2011	2013
Tranebergs IF	2								1925–26	1925–26
Trelleborgs FF	22	6	10	6	35	30	+5	27.3	1992	2011
Tyresö FF	2	2	0	0	3	1	+2	100.0	1985	1985
Umeå FC	12	5	4	3	23	17	+6	41.7	1993	2000
Uppsala IF	2								1929–30	1929–30
Värtans IK	10								1935–36	1940–41
Vasalunds IF	16	8	5	3	39	21	+18	50.0	1982	1997
Västerås SK	22	12	6	4	31	18	+13	54.5	1955–56	2000
Västerviks AIS	4								1934–35	1935–36
Västra Frölunda IF	12	6	5	1	24	15	+9	50.0	1988	1999
Visby IF Gute	2	2	0	0	4	1	+3	100.0	1994	1994
Westermalms IF	10								1908	1932–33
