= Sven Friberg =

Swedish footballer and manager

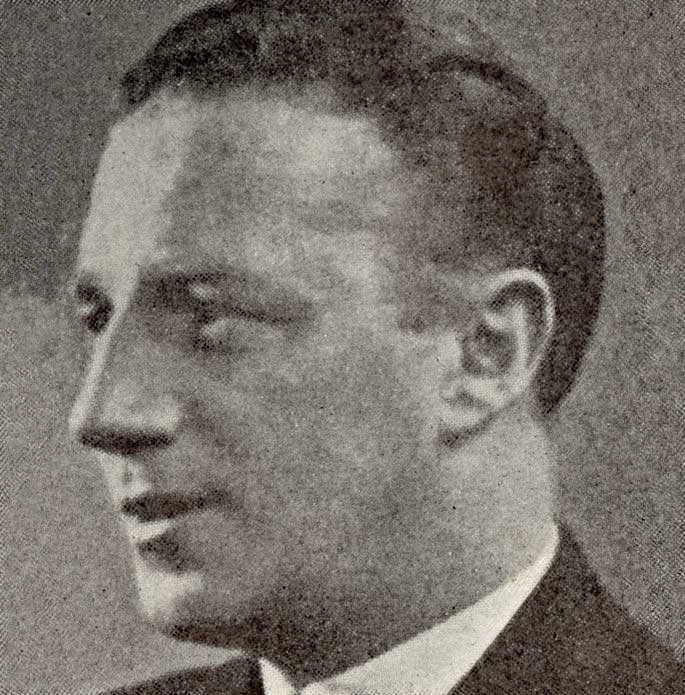
- Friberg circa 1930

Personal information
- Date of birth: 7 February 1895
- Place of birth: Lysekil, Sweden
- Date of death: 26 May 1964 (aged 69)
- Place of death: Gothenburg, Sweden
- Position: Defender

Senior career*
Years	Team	Apps	(Gls)
- IFK Göteborg
- Örgryte IS

International career
1915–1928	Sweden national team	41	(0)

Managerial career
- 1930–1931: Örgryte IS
Medal record
Representing Sweden
Olympic Games
Bronze medal – third place	1924 Paris	Team
- * Club domestic league appearances and goals

Sven Richard Friberg (7 February 1895 – 26 May 1964) was a Swedish association football defender who won a bronze medal at the 1924 Summer Olympics. Between 1915 and 1928 he played 41 international matches and scored no goals.

== Playing career ==
=== Club ===
Friberg won the Svenska Serien in 1914–15 with IFK Göteborg.

With Örgryte IS he won the Svenska Serien in 1920–21 and 1923–24 as well as Allsvenskan in 1925–26 and 1926–28.

=== International ===
Friberg captained the Sweden national team which won a bronze medal at the 1924 Summer Olympics. In total he made 41 appearances between 1915 and 1928, captaining 30.

== Managerial career ==
Friberg returned to Örgryte IS as a coach, managing the club from 1930 to 1931.

== Honours ==
IFK Göteborg

- Svenska Serien: 1914–15

Örgryte IS

- Svenska Serien: 1920–21, 1923–24
- Allsvenskan: 1925–26, 1926–28
