= List of IFK Göteborg chairmen =

Idrottsföreningen Kamraterna Göteborg, commonly known as IFK Göteborg, is a Swedish professional football club based in Gothenburg. IFK Göteborg is a member-owned association, and the club's annual general meeting is the highest policy-making body. Each club member has one vote. The general meeting approves the accounts, votes to elect the chairman and other board members, and decides on incoming motions. The most recently elected chairman is Magnus Nilsson.

The following is a list of chairmen of IFK Göteborg and the club's major titles from the founding of the club in 1904 to the present day. From its inception until 31 December 2017, all sections were part of the same sports club, but starting on 1 January 2018, the sections became separate organisations, under a parent alliance organisation called "IFK Göteborg". The previous organisation number was taken over by the new football organisation. The list includes chairmen of the club up to and including 2017, and chairmen of the football organisation from 2018 on, and does not include chairmen of individual sections or the alliance organisation. A separate board and chairman for football existed at times, for example in 1931 when Carl Linde was its chairman, while Knut Albrechtsson headed the club board.

As of the start of the 2025 season, 22 men have held the club chairmanship, of whom only one, Herbert Johansson, have held the job for multiple spells. Counting each of his two periods separately, there have been 23 chairmen. The most successful IFK Göteborg chairman in terms of trophies won is Gunnar Larsson, under whose stewardship the side won the Swedish championships ten times, Svenska Cupen three times, and the UEFA Cup twice. Nils Grönwall is the club's longest-serving chairman, having held the post for 22 years, from 1947 to 1968.

== Key ==
Table headers

- From and To – If no exact date is given, the main years when the chairman held his position are displayed.
- Championship titles – Swedish championship title winning seasons while each man was chairman of IFK Göteborg. This column is sorted by number of titles won.
- Other titles – Other notable title the club won while the chairman held his position. The cell is sorted by number of titles won.
- Ref – Reference for the chairman.

== Chairmen ==
As of 27 February 2025

No.	Name	Nationality	From	To	Championship titles	Other titles	Ref
1st	Arthur Wingren	Swedish	4 October 1904	1905	–	–	
2nd	Carl Fredrik Andersson	Swedish	1906	1906	–	–	
3rd	P. A. Sjöholm	Swedish	1907	1910	1908; 1910	–	
4th	Carl Helgesson	Swedish	1911	1914	–	1912–13 Svenska Serien; 1913–14 Svenska Serien	
5th	Herbert Johansson	Swedish	1915	1919	1918	1914–15 Svenska Serien; 1915–16 Svenska Serien; 1916–17 Svenska Serien	
6th	Carl "Ceve" Linde	Swedish	1920	1920	–	–	
7th	Knut Albrechtsson	Swedish	1921	1931	–	–	
8th	Julius Rothenberg	Swedish	1932	1934	–	–	
9th	Herbert Johansson	Swedish	1935	1946	1934–35; 1941–42	1938–39 Division 2	
10th	Nils Grönwall	Swedish	1947	1968	1957–58	1950–51 Division 2	
11th	Erik Johannesson	Swedish	1969	1971	1969	–	
12th	Bertil Westblad	Swedish	1972	1981	–	1978–79 Svenska Cupen; 1976 Division 2	
13th	Gunnar Larsson	Swedish	1982	2000	1982; 1983; 1984; 1987; 1990; 1991; 1993; 1994; 1995; 1996	1981–82 UEFA Cup; 1986–87 UEFA Cup; 1981–82 Svenska Cupen; 1982–83 Svenska Cupen; 1991 Svenska Cupen	
14th	Kurt Eliasson	Swedish	2001	2002	–	–	
15th	Bengt Halse	Swedish	2003	2005	–	–	
16th	Stig Lundström	Swedish	2006	9 March 2009	2007	2008 Svenska Cupen; 2008 Svenska Supercupen	
17th	Kent Olsson	Swedish	9 March 2009	4 March 2013	–	–	
18th	Bertil Rignäs	Swedish	4 March 2013	6 March 2014	–	2012–13 Svenska Cupen	
19th	Karl Jartun	Swedish	6 March 2014	7 March 2016	–	2014–15 Svenska Cupen	
20th	Frank Andersson	Swedish	7 March 2016	5 March 2018	–	–	
21st	Mats Engström	Swedish	5 March 2018	15 March 2021	–	2019–20 Svenska Cupen	
22nd	Richard Berkling	Swedish	15 March 2021	27 February 2025	–	–	
23rd	Magnus Nilsson	Swedish	27 February 2025		–	–	
