= 1926–27 Division 2 (Swedish football) =

Swedish League Division 2
- Season: 1926–27
- Champions: Sandvikens IF; IK City; Djurgårdens IF; Skara IF; Stattena IF
- Promoted: Djurgårdens IF; Stattena IF
- Relegated: Västerås SK; Kolbäcks AIF; Mariebergs IK; Stockholms BK; Vänersborgs IF; IK Ymer; Ängelholms IF; Lunds BK

Statistics of Division 2 for the 1926–27 season.

== League standings ==
=== Division 2 Uppsvenska Serien 1926–27 ===
Teams from a large part of northern Sweden, approximately above the province of Medelpad, were not allowed to play in the national league system until the 1953–54 season, and a championship was instead played to decide the best team in Norrland.

Pos	Team	Pld	W	D	L	GF	GA	GD	Pts	Qualification or relegation
1	Sandvikens IF	14	11	1	2	70	23	+47	23	
2	Sandvikens AIK	14	10	1	3	50	21	+29	21	
3	IK Brage	14	7	3	4	32	34	−2	17	
4	Brynäs IF	14	6	3	5	39	34	+5	15	
5	Gefle IF	14	5	1	8	34	52	−18	11	
6	Kvarnsvedens GIF	14	4	2	8	22	42	−20	10	
7	Skutskärs IF	14	3	2	9	28	44	−16	8	Relegated to Division 3 (Note: Skutskärs IF and IK Sirius who both finished last or second last in their respective leagues, and should have been relegated, were allowed to remain in Division 2.)
8	IK Sirius	14	2	3	9	33	58	−25	7	Relegated to Division 3

Notes:

No teams from Uppsvenska Serien were allowed to be promoted to Allsvenskan, due to both geographic and economic reasons.

=== Division 2 Mellansvenska Serien 1926–27 ===
Pos	Team	Pld	W	D	L	GF	GA	GD	Pts	Qualification or relegation
1	IK City	22	16	1	5	84	33	+51	33	Playoffs for promotion to Allsvenskan
2	IFK Västerås	22	12	5	5	57	36	+21	29	
3	Västerås IK	22	11	5	6	54	41	+13	27	
4	Hallstahammars SK	22	10	5	7	44	38	+6	25	
5	Köpings IS	22	9	5	8	51	42	+9	23	
6	Örebro SK	22	9	4	9	40	53	−13	22	
7	Surahammars IF	22	8	5	9	45	56	−11	21	
8	Katrineholms SK	22	7	5	10	37	53	−16	19 (Note: Tie breaker is goal average.)	
9	IFK Arboga	22	7	5	10	34	53	−19	19	
10	Katrineholms AIK	22	7	3	12	50	55	−5	17	
11	Västerås SK	22	5	6	11	39	49	−10	16	Relegated to Division 3
12	Kolbäcks AIF	22	5	3	14	41	64	−23	13	Relegated to Division 3

=== Division 2 Östsvenska Serien 1926–27 ===
Pos	Team	Pld	W	D	L	GF	GA	GD	Pts	Qualification or relegation
1	Djurgårdens IF	18	17	0	1	60	9	+51	34	Playoffs for promotion to Allsvenskan
2	BK Derby	18	12	1	5	41	24	+17	25	
3	Hammarby IF	18	11	1	6	45	25	+20	23	
4	Sundbybergs IK	18	9	2	7	37	36	+1	20 (Note: Tie breaker is goal average.)	
5	IFK Stockholm	18	9	2	7	45	46	−1	20	
6	Huvudsta IS	18	8	3	7	30	29	+1	19	
7	IF Linnéa	18	6	1	11	38	53	−15	13	
8	Reymersholms IK	18	5	3	10	25	37	−12	13	
9	Mariebergs IK	18	5	1	12	33	58	−25	11	Relegated to Division 3
10	Stockholms BK	18	1	0	17	19	56	−37	2	Relegated to Division 3

=== Division 2 Västsvenska Serien 1926–27 ===
Pos	Team	Pld	W	D	L	GF	GA	GD	Pts	Qualification or relegation
1	Skara IF	18	13	3	2	53	24	+29	29	Playoffs for promotion to Allsvenskan
2	Fässbergs IF	18	10	3	5	64	37	+27	23 (Note: Tie breaker is goal average.)	
3	Majornas IK	18	10	3	5	48	34	+14	23	
4	Krokslätts FF	18	8	5	5	41	33	+8	21	
5	Jonsereds IF	18	8	4	6	51	34	+17	20	
6	Uddevalla IS	18	6	5	7	37	41	−4	17	
7	IF Heimer	18	7	1	10	43	53	−10	15	
8	Trollhättans IF	18	5	3	10	33	48	−15	13	
9	Vänersborgs IF	18	4	2	12	34	67	−33	10	Relegated to Division 3
10	IK Ymer	18	3	3	12	36	66	−30	9	Relegated to Division 3

=== Division 2 Sydsvenska Serien 1926–27 ===
Pos	Team	Pld	W	D	L	GF	GA	GD	Pts	Qualification or relegation
1	Stattena IF	18	10	4	4	41	24	+17	24	Playoffs for promotion to Allsvenskan
2	IS Halmia	18	9	5	4	37	22	+15	23 (Note: Tie breaker is goal average.)	
3	Halmstads BK	18	11	1	6	42	25	+17	23	
4	Malmö BI	18	9	2	7	38	41	−3	20	
5	IFK Malmö	18	8	3	7	36	34	+2	19	
6	Malmö FF	18	7	4	7	30	31	−1	18	
7	IFK Helsingborg	18	6	4	8	28	31	−3	16	
8	Varbergs GIF	18	5	3	10	28	40	−12	13	
9	Ängelholms IF	18	3	7	8	19	36	−17	13	Relegated to Division 3
10	Lunds BK	18	4	3	11	16	31	−15	11	Relegated to Division 3
