= 2009 Allsvenskan =

85th season of Allsvenskan

Allsvenskan
- Season: 2009
- Champions: AIK; 5th Allsvenskan title 11th Swedish championship title
- Relegated: Örgryte IS; Hammarby IF
- Champions League: AIK
- Europa League: IFK Göteborg; IF Elfsborg; Kalmar FF; Gefle IF
- Matches: 240
- Goals: 584 (2.43 per match)
- Top goalscorer: Tobias Hysén; Wanderson (18)
- Biggest home win: IFK Göteborg 6-0 Djurgården (11 April 2009)
- Biggest away win: Örgryte 1-5 GAIS (5 April 2009); Halmstad 0-4 Häcken (30 August 2009)
- Highest scoring: Kalmar FF 5-4 Malmö FF (27 October 2009)
- Highest attendance: 26,241; AIK 2–0 Djurgården (28 September 2009)
- Lowest attendance: 1,284; Häcken 1–0 Trelleborg (22 April 2009)
- Average attendance: 7,952

Allsvenskan 2009, part of the 2009 Swedish football season, was the 85th Allsvenskan season played. AIK clinched their first Swedish title since 1998.

== Participating teams ==
Locations of the 2009 Allsvenskan teams

Club	Last season	First season in league	First season of current spell
AIK	5th	1924–25	2006
IF Brommapojkarna	3rd (Superettan)	2007	2009
Djurgårdens IF	12th	1927–28	2001
IF Elfsborg	2nd	1926–27	1997
GAIS	11th	1924–25	2006
Gefle IF	13th	1933–34	2005
IFK Göteborg	3rd	1924–25	1977
Halmstads BK	8th	1933–34	1993
Hammarby IF	9th	1924–25	1998
Helsingborgs IF	4th	1924–25	1993
BK Häcken	2nd (Superettan)	1983	2009
Kalmar FF	1st	1949–50	2004
Malmö FF	6th	1931–32	2001
Trelleborgs FF	10th	1985	2007
Örebro SK	7th	1946–47	2007
Örgryte IS	1st (Superettan)	1924–25	2009

== Overview ==
Team	Location	Arena	Capacity	Average attendance	Manager
AIK	Solna	Råsunda Stadion	36,608	17,436	(Sweden) Mikael Stahre
IF Brommapojkarna	Stockholm	Grimsta IP	4,500	2,860	(Sweden) Kim Bergstrand
Djurgårdens IF	Stockholm	Stockholms Stadion	14,500	9,435	(Sweden) Andrée Jeglertz (England) Steve Galloway
IF Elfsborg	Borås	Borås Arena	17,800	9,719	(Sweden) Magnus Haglund
GAIS	Gothenburg	Gamla Ullevi	18,800	5,687	(Sweden) Alexander Axén
Gefle IF	Gävle	Strömvallen	7,300	4,314	(Sweden) Per Olsson
Halmstads BK	Halmstad	Örjans Vall	15,500	5,012	(Sweden) Janne Andersson
Hammarby IF	Stockholm	Söderstadion	16,197	10,381	(Sweden) Thom Åhlund
Helsingborgs IF	Helsingborg	Olympia	16,673	9,470	(Sweden) Bosse Nilsson
BK Häcken	Gothenburg	Rambergsvallen	7,000	3,179	(Sweden) Peter Gerhardsson
IFK Göteborg	Gothenburg	Gamla Ullevi	18,800	13,813	(Sweden) Stefan Rehn (Sweden) Jonas Olsson
Kalmar FF	Kalmar	Fredriksskans	9,000	5,311	(Sweden) Nanne Bergstrand
Malmö FF	Malmö	Swedbank Stadion	24,000	14,815	(Sweden) Roland Nilsson
Trelleborgs FF	Trelleborg	Vångavallen	10,000	2,992	(Sweden) Tom Prahl
Örebro SK	Örebro	Behrn Arena	14,500	7,886	(Finland) Sixten Boström
Örgryte IS	Gothenburg	Gamla Ullevi	18,800	4,939	(Norway) Åge Hareide

== League table ==
Pos	Team	Pld	W	D	L	GF	GA	GD	Pts	Qualification or relegation
1	AIK (C)	30	18	7	5	36	20	+16	61	Qualification to Champions League second qualifying round
2	IFK Göteborg	30	17	6	7	53	24	+29	57	Qualification to Europa League third qualifying round (Note: IFK Göteborg qualified for the Third qualifying round of the Europa League as Svenska Cupen champions 2009.)
3	IF Elfsborg	30	15	10	5	43	34	+9	55	Qualification to Europa League second qualifying round (Note: Elfsborg qualified for the Second qualifying round of the Europa League as they received IFK Göteborg's initial qualifying spot.)
4	Kalmar FF	30	14	8	8	53	39	+14	50	Qualification to Europa League first qualifying round (Note: Kalmar FF qualified for the Europa League as they received Elfsborgs initial qualifying spot.)
5	BK Häcken	30	13	9	8	43	30	+13	48	
6	Örebro SK	30	12	9	9	33	32	+1	45	
7	Malmö FF	30	11	10	9	40	25	+15	43	
8	Helsingborgs IF	30	13	4	13	39	39	0	43	
9	Trelleborgs FF	30	11	8	11	41	34	+7	41	
10	Gefle IF	30	10	9	11	28	38	−10	39	Qualification to Europa League first qualifying round (Note: Sweden was among the best three associations in the UEFA Fair Play ranking and thus received an additional spot in the first qualifying round of the Europa League, Gefle received the qualifying spot for their ranking in Allsvenskans Fair Play ranking.)
11	GAIS	30	8	11	11	41	38	+3	35	
12	IF Brommapojkarna	30	9	7	14	32	46	−14	34	
13	Halmstads BK	30	8	8	14	29	43	−14	32	
14	Djurgårdens IF (O)	30	8	5	17	24	49	−25	29	Qualification to Relegation play-offs
15	Örgryte IS (R)	30	6	7	17	27	49	−22	25	Relegation to Superettan
16	Hammarby IF (R)	30	6	4	20	22	44	−22	22	Relegation to Superettan

Source: svenskfotboll.se (in Swedish)
Rules for classification: 1) points; 2) goal difference; 3) number of goals scored.
(C) Champions; (O) Play-off winners; (R) Relegated

== Positions by round ==
Team ╲ Round	1	2	3	4	5	6	7	8	9	10	11	12	13	14	15	16	17	18	19	20	21	22	23	24	25	26	27	28	29	30
AIK	4	3	4	3	1	4	6	4	4	4	5	4	3	3	5	5	5	3	1	2	1	1	1	2	1	1	1	1	1	1
IFK Göteborg	13	7	9	6	5	1	3	3	3	1	1	1	1	1	1	2	4	1	2	3	2	2	2	1	2	2	2	2	2	2
IF Elfsborg	8	6	7	4	2	3	2	2	1	2	2	2	2	2	2	1	3	5	3	1	3	4	4	3	3	3	3	3	3	3
Kalmar FF	6	13	13	15	15	14	11	10	11	9	8	7	5	5	4	4	2	4	5	4	4	3	3	4	4	4	4	4	5	4
BK Häcken	12	15	10	14	12	12																								5
Örebro SK	14	14	11	9	6	9																								6
Malmö FF	2	2	2	1	4	6																								7
Helsingborgs IF	3	1	1	2	7	2																								8
Trelleborgs FF	10	10	5	7	10	8																								9
Gefle IF	7	5	6	10	11	11																								10
GAIS	1	8	12	8	8	10																								11
IF Brommapojkarna	11	4	3	5	3	5																								12
Halmstads BK	15	12	15	12	9	7																								13
Djurgårdens IF	5	9	8	13	14	15																								14
Örgryte IS	16	16	16	16	16	16																								15
Hammarby IF	9	11	14	11	13	13																								16

Leader
2010–11 UEFA Europa League First qualifying round
2010–11 UEFA Europa League Second qualifying round
Relegation play-offs
Relegation to 2010 Superettan

Source: everysport.com

== Results ==
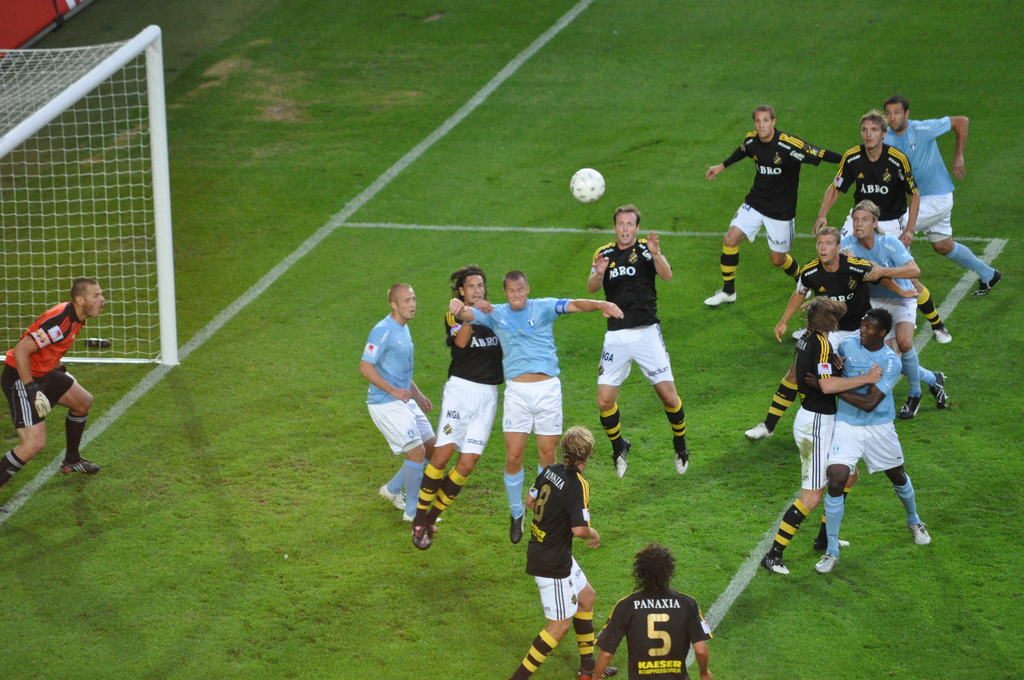
Malmö FF vs AIK in July 2009

Home \ Away	AIK	BP	DIF	IFE	GAI	GIF	IFKG	HBK	HAM	HIF	BKH	KFF	MFF	TFF	ÖSK	ÖIS
AIK		2–1	2–0	0–0	1–0	1–0	1–0	1–0	1–0	0–3	2–0	1–1	0–1	1–0	1–1	3–0
IF Brommapojkarna	2–3		1–4	1–1	1–0	1–0	0–3	2–1	0–1	0–3	2–0	1–2	1–1	2–2	3–0	1–2
Djurgårdens IF	0–1	0–2		1–2	2–1	0–0	0–0	0–2	0–1	2–1	1–0	2–0	1–2	0–0	1–0	2–1
IF Elfsborg	0–0	1–0	3–1		2–2	2–3	2–0	4–0	1–1	1–0	1–1	1–1	1–0	1–0	2–1	3–0
GAIS	2–2	0–1	1–1	1–1		4–0	0–1	1–1	2–2	1–4	3–0	2–2	1–1	0–1	3–0	1–0
Gefle IF	1–0	3–2	2–0	1–2	0–0		0–3	1–0	1–0	0–2	1–1	1–1	0–3	2–1	2–0	2–2
IFK Göteborg	1–2	4–0	6–0	4–0	2–1	3–0		2–2	2–0	2–2	2–2	2–1	2–0	3–1	1–0	3–0
Halmstads BK	1–2	0–1	3–0	1–2	1–3	0–2	0–0		1–0	2–1	0–4	2–0	0–3	1–1	1–1	2–1
Hammarby IF	1–2	1–0	3–1	2–3	1–2	1–2	0–1	0–0		1–2	0–1	1–4	1–0	2–1	0–1	0–1
Helsingborgs IF	3–2	0–1	0–2	3–2	0–1	2–0	1–0	1–3	1–0		1–0	1–1	1–0	2–2	0–1	3–1
BK Häcken	0–2	5–1	2–1	1–1	1–0	0–0	4–1	2–2	2–0	3–0		0–0	0–1	1–0	2–2	2–0
Kalmar FF	0–1	3–1	6–1	3–1	2–2	1–1	2–1	0–1	3–0	2–0	2–1		5–4	2–0	1–3	1–0
Malmö FF	0–0	1–1	2–1	5–0	2–2	0–0	0–1	0–0	3–1	0–0	1–2	1–2		1–1	0–0	3–0
Trelleborgs FF	1–0	0–0	3–0	0–1	3–0	2–1	2–1	4–0	4–2	4–2	2–2	1–2	0–2		0–1	2–1
Örebro SK	1–1	2–2	2–0	0–1	2–0	2–0	0–0	2–1	2–0	2–0	1–3	2–1	0–3	1–1		2–2
Örgryte IS	0–1	1–1	0–0	1–1	1–5	2–2	1–2	2–1	0–0	3–0	0–1	4–2	1–0	0–2	0–1	

Source: Swedish Football Association (in Swedish)
Legend: Blue = home team win; Yellow = draw; Red = away team win.

== Relegation play-offs ==
4 November 2009
19:15

Assyriska FF	2–0	Djurgården
Östlundh 38'; Marklund 47'	Report

Södertälje Fotbollsarena, Södertälje
Attendance: 7,131
Referee: Daniel Stålhammar (Landskrona)

8 November 2009
16:45

Djurgården	3–0 (a.e.t.)	Assyriska FF
Tauer 52'; Youssef 60'; Jonson 116'	Report

Stockholms Stadion, Stockholm
Attendance: 10,458
Referee: Martin Ingvarsson (Hässleholm)

Djurgården won 3–2 on aggregate.

== Top scorers ==
As of 2 November 2009

Rank	Player	Club	Goals
1	(Sweden) Tobias Hysén	IFK Göteborg	18
1	(Brazil) Wanderson do Carmo	GAIS	18
3	(Sweden) Daniel Larsson	Malmö FF	11
4	(Sweden) Jonas Henriksson	Häcken	10
4	(Nigeria) Edward Ofere	Malmö FF	10
4	(Brazil) Álvaro Santos	Örgryte	10
7	(Argentina) Iván Obolo	AIK	9
7	(Sweden) Rasmus Elm	Kalmar FF	9
9	(Denmark) Kim Olsen	Örebro	8
9	(Brazil) Daniel Mendes	Kalmar FF	8
9	(Sweden) Fredrik Jensen	Trelleborgs FF	8
9	(England) James Keene	Elfsborg	8
9	(Sweden) Rasmus Jönsson	Helsingborg	8
9	(Sweden) Emir Kujovic	Halmstad	8
15	5 players		7
20	11 players		6
31	10 players		5
41	15 players		4
56	30 players		3
86	30 players		2
116	73 players		2

== Attendances ==
#	Club	Average attendance	Highest attendance
1	AIK	17,436	26,241
2	Malmö FF	14,815	23,347
3	IFK Göteborg	13,412	17,947
4	Hammarby IF	10,381	23,884
5	IF Elfsborg	9,719	15,773
6	Helsingborgs IF	9,470	15,800
7	Djurgårdens IF	9,435	21,884
8	Örebro SK	7,886	11,191
9	GAIS	5,687	13,442
10	Kalmar FF	5,311	7,753
11	Halmstads BK	5,012	9,247
12	Örgryte IS	4,939	17,531
13	Gefle IF	4,314	6,973
14	BK Häcken	3,179	10,465
15	Trelleborgs FF	2,992	7,191
16	IF Brommapojkarna	2,860	6,755
