= IFK Göteborg–Örgryte IS rivalry =

Football rivalry in Sweden

- Location: Gothenburg
- Teams: IFK Göteborg; Örgryte IS
- First meeting: 12 July 1905
- Latest meeting: 9 August 2009; Örgryte IS 1–2 IFK Göteborg

Statistics
- Total meetings: Competitive: 149
- Most wins: Competitive: IFK Göteborg (72)
- Largest victory: 30 August 1907; Örgryte IS 8–0 IFK Göteborg

The fixture between football clubs IFK Göteborg and Örgryte IS is a local derby in Gothenburg, Sweden and a fierce rivalry. The derby does not have a unique name and is commonly known by the collective term Göteborgsderby (transl. Gothenburg derby) which is also used for other fixtures between Gothenburg clubs.

Due to the long history of both clubs, no other rivals in Swedish football have played each other more times (including friendly matches), and the record attendance for Swedish club football was set at a derby in 1959.

== Background ==
Örgryte IS is the oldest club in Sweden, founded in 1887, and played the first Swedish football match by association rules in 1892. They dominated Swedish football during the 1890s and 1900s, winning 10 of their 14 Swedish championships during that era. IFK Göteborg was founded in 1904 and won its first competitive match against Örgryte in 1910. Since then, IFK have been the dominant team and has won 18 Swedish championships as well as two UEFA Cup titles.

== Honours ==
As of 17 September 2017

Honour	IFK Göteborg	Örgryte IS
Swedish Championship	18	12
Allsvenskan	13	2
Allsvenskan play-offs	5	1
Mästerskapsserien	1	0
Svenska Serien	5	4
Fyrkantserien	2	0
Svenska Cupen	7	1
Svenska Supercupen	1	0
Svenska Mästerskapet	3	11
Corinthian Bowl	0	7
Svenska Fotbollpokalen	0	2
UEFA Cup	2	0

== Matches ==
As of 17 September 2017

Competition	Matches	Wins		Draws
Competition	Matches	IFK Göteborg	Örgryte IS	Draws
Allsvenskan	100	54	27	19
Allsvenskan play-offs	2	1	1	0
Svenska Serien	20	10	5	5
Fyrkantserien	4	3	0	1
Division 2	4	2	2	0
Göteborgsserien	2	0	2	0
Svenska Cupen	3	0	2	1
Svenska Mästerskapet	11	2	6	3
Corinthian Bowl	3	0	3	0
Total	149	72	48	29

=== League ===
==== IFK Göteborg at home ====
Date	Venue	Attendance	Score	Competition
17 September 1905	Idrottsplatsen	–	1–4	Göteborgsserien klass 1
20 November 1910	Idrottsplatsen	–	4–0	Svenska Serien
31 May 1911	Idrottsplatsen	2,500 (Note: Also reported as 2,000.)	1–3	Svenska Serien
29 September 1912 (Note: Also reported as 22 September 1912.)	Walhalla IP	3,500 (Note: Also reported as 4,000.)	1–1	Svenska Serien
26 April 1914	Walhalla IP	3,300	1–2	Svenska Serien
9 May 1915	Walhalla IP	3,321	1–0	Svenska Serien
14 May 1916	Walhalla IP	3,327	2–2	Svenska Serien
26 November 1916	Gamla Ullevi	3,500	6–0	Svenska Serien
24 November 1918	Gamla Ullevi	3,974	0–0	Fyrkantserien
22 May 1919	Gamla Ullevi	5,877	2–1	Fyrkantserien
5 May 1920	Gamla Ullevi	6,000	0–0	Svenska Serien
5 November 1922	Gamla Ullevi	7,088	1–2	Svenska Serien
21 October 1923 (Note: Also reported as 21 October 1923.)	Gamla Ullevi	8,106	1–1	Svenska Serien
22 August 1924	Gamla Ullevi	6,010	2–2	Allsvenskan
7 August 1925	Gamla Ullevi	5,778	4–3	Allsvenskan
6 August 1926	Gamla Ullevi	7,770	3–2	Allsvenskan
1 June 1928	Gamla Ullevi	9,408	3–2	Allsvenskan
24 May 1929	Gamla Ullevi	11,977	1–1	Allsvenskan
23 August 1929	Gamla Ullevi	8,230	0–2	Allsvenskan
27 May 1931	Slottsskogsvallen	5,186	3–1	Allsvenskan
13 May 1932	Gamla Ullevi	11,473	1–4	Allsvenskan
12 August 1932	Gamla Ullevi	6,858	3–6	Allsvenskan
11 August 1933	Gamla Ullevi	9,301	4–0	Allsvenskan
17 August 1934	Gamla Ullevi	16,236	4–1	Allsvenskan
8 May 1936	Gamla Ullevi	8,907	0–0	Allsvenskan
4 June 1937	Gamla Ullevi	7,393	1–4	Allsvenskan
29 April 1938	Gamla Ullevi	11,628	0–0	Allsvenskan
10 May 1940	Gamla Ullevi	3,428	3–1	Allsvenskan
9 August 1950	Gamla Ullevi	11,663	4–1	Division 2
3 June 1959	Ullevi	52,194 (Note: Attendance record for club football in Sweden.)	0–3	Allsvenskan
8 September 1960	Ullevi	19,688	3–3	Allsvenskan
30 August 1961	Ullevi	47,734 (Note: Also reported as 47,744.)	3–3	Allsvenskan
24 May 1962	Ullevi	35,296	1–2	Allsvenskan
30 May 1963	Ullevi	28,509	0–1	Allsvenskan
21 May 1964	Ullevi	42,689	3–5	Allsvenskan
2 September 1965	Ullevi	32,363 (Note: Also reported as 33,949.)	1–4	Allsvenskan
8 September 1966	Ullevi	23,543 (Note: Also reported as 24,996.)	1–2	Allsvenskan
24 August 1967	Ullevi	22,730 (Note: Also reported as 24,205.)	4–1	Allsvenskan
2 September 1968	Ullevi	21,530	1–1	Allsvenskan
3 September 1970	Ullevi	13,645	1–1	Allsvenskan
16 May 1974	Ullevi	15,380	1–6	Division 2
27 August 1981	Ullevi	40,072	4–1	Allsvenskan
27 May 1982	Ullevi	29,544 (Note: Also reported as 29,534.)	1–2	Allsvenskan
1 September 1983	Ullevi	15,123	2–0	Allsvenskan
14 June 1984	Ullevi	22,407	3–0	Allsvenskan
9 May 1985	Ullevi	24,618	0–0	Allsvenskan
31 October 1985	Ullevi	30,315	2–4	Allsvenskan play-offs (final)
1 September 1986	Ullevi	19,926	4–1	Allsvenskan
11 June 1987	Ullevi	16,470	1–2	Allsvenskan
6 June 1988	Ullevi	19,265	2–1	Allsvenskan
17 September 1989	Ullevi	4,369	0–1	Allsvenskan
13 September 1990	Ullevi	7,360	3–0	Allsvenskan
26 August 1993	Gamla Ullevi	8,386	1–1	Allsvenskan
8 May 1995	Gamla Ullevi	8,468	3–0	Allsvenskan
20 May 1996	Gamla Ullevi	8,581	1–0	Allsvenskan
14 April 1997	Gamla Ullevi	12,564	2–0	Allsvenskan
11 May 1998	Gamla Ullevi	12,213	2–5	Allsvenskan
15 August 1999	Gamla Ullevi	15,618	1–0	Allsvenskan
17 April 2000	Gamla Ullevi	17,023	2–0	Allsvenskan
1 October 2001	Gamla Ullevi	16,095	1–1	Allsvenskan
10 September 2002	Ullevi	42,386	2–5	Allsvenskan
27 May 2003	Ullevi	40,382	5–2	Allsvenskan
9 August 2004	Ullevi	36,312	4–0	Allsvenskan
24 May 2005	Ullevi	33,622	3–0	Allsvenskan
10 May 2006	Ullevi	20,172	2–1	Allsvenskan
20 April 2009	Gamla Ullevi	17,683	3–0	Allsvenskan

==== Örgryte IS at home ====
Date	Venue	Attendance	Score	Competition
1 October 1905	Idrottsplatsen	–	4–0	Göteborgsserien klass 1
8 July 1910	Idrottsplatsen	2,500	5–2	Svenska Serien
15 October 1911	Walhalla IP	2,000	2–6	Svenska Serien
27 April 1913	Walhalla IP	2,987	1–2	Svenska Serien
14 September 1913	Walhalla IP	3,658	0–1	Svenska Serien
25 October 1914	Walhalla IP	2,000	1–4	Svenska Serien
19 September 1915	Walhalla IP	2,400	0–2	Svenska Serien
15 June 1917	Walhalla IP	3,200	0–1	Svenska Serien
17 May 1918	Walhalla IP	4,000	1–3	Fyrkantserien
19 October 1919	Walhalla IP	6,300	0–2	Fyrkantserien
8 June 1921	Walhalla IP	4,500	1–1	Svenska Serien
9 June 1922	Gamla Ullevi	4,000	1–3	Svenska Serien
2 May 1924	Gamla Ullevi	5,000	5–0	Svenska Serien
8 May 1925	Gamla Ullevi	11,046	0–1	Allsvenskan
4 June 1926	Slottsskogsvallen	10,394	1–1	Allsvenskan
13 May 1927	Gamla Ullevi	9,472	1–2	Allsvenskan
24 August 1927	Slottsskogsvallen	5,078	2–2	Allsvenskan
17 August 1928	Gamla Ullevi	8,726	2–4	Allsvenskan
16 May 1930	Gamla Ullevi	11,666	3–1	Allsvenskan
8 August 1930	Gamla Ullevi	7,456	0–3	Allsvenskan
21 August 1931	Slottsskogsvallen	10,674	0–1	Allsvenskan
12 May 1933	Gamla Ullevi	10,187	3–1	Allsvenskan
4 May 1934	Gamla Ullevi	10,329	3–0	Allsvenskan
17 May 1935	Gamla Ullevi	13,528	0–1	Allsvenskan
16 August 1935	Gamla Ullevi	9,501	1–3	Allsvenskan
18 April 1937	Gamla Ullevi	8,761 (Note: Also reported as 8,771.)	0–2	Allsvenskan
4 May 1938	Gamla Ullevi	9,961	1–3	Allsvenskan
11 August 1939	Gamla Ullevi	9,250	1–2	Allsvenskan
11 May 1951	Gamla Ullevi	17,665	0–1	Division 2
20 August 1959	Ullevi	46,294	1–0	Allsvenskan
9 June 1960	Ullevi	42,786	2–1	Allsvenskan
7 June 1961	Ullevi	36,573	3–5	Allsvenskan
30 August 1962	Ullevi	18,267	2–1	Allsvenskan
22 August 1963	Ullevi	31,532	1–3	Allsvenskan
24 September 1964	Ullevi	30,080	1–5	Allsvenskan
10 June 1965	Ullevi	31,573 (Note: Also reported as 33,055.)	0–0	Allsvenskan
9 June 1966	Ullevi	27,594 (Note: Also reported as 29,072.)	0–2	Allsvenskan
24 May 1967	Ullevi	26,752 (Note: Also reported as 26,807.)	1–1	Allsvenskan
12 June 1968	Ullevi	21,482 (Note: Also reported as 21,458.)	2–2	Allsvenskan
23 April 1970	Ullevi	15,205	2–1	Allsvenskan
3 October 1974	Ullevi	11,380	3–1	Division 2
21 May 1981	Ullevi	34,426	2–1	Allsvenskan
25 August 1982	Ullevi	19,307	0–2	Allsvenskan
19 May 1983	Ullevi	24,358	1–3	Allsvenskan
5 September 1984	Ullevi	17,614	1–4	Allsvenskan
4 September 1985	Ullevi	26,834	2–1	Allsvenskan
3 November 1985	Ullevi	38,563 (Note: Attendance record for Allsvenskan play-offs.)	2–3	Allsvenskan play-offs (final)
29 May 1986	Ullevi	32,822	0–1	Allsvenskan
2 September 1987	Ullevi	15,298	1–4	Allsvenskan
15 August 1988	Ullevi	12,286	1–1	Allsvenskan
21 May 1989	Ullevi	8,937 (Note: Also reported as 8,397.)	0–2	Allsvenskan
2 August 1990	Ullevi	6,578	0–3	Allsvenskan
27 May 1993	Gamla Ullevi	7,294	0–1	Allsvenskan
31 August 1995	Gamla Ullevi	11,107	1–1	Allsvenskan
30 September 1996	Gamla Ullevi	6,188	1–4	Allsvenskan
13 September 1997	Gamla Ullevi	8,684	1–3	Allsvenskan
20 October 1998	Gamla Ullevi	6,679	1–2	Allsvenskan
11 May 1999	Gamla Ullevi	10,292	2–2	Allsvenskan
28 October 2000	Gamla Ullevi	9,141	1–2	Allsvenskan
28 May 2001	Gamla Ullevi	16,978	0–2	Allsvenskan
8 May 2002	Ullevi	37,763	2–1	Allsvenskan
30 September 2003	Ullevi	37,026	4–1	Allsvenskan
4 May 2004	Ullevi	40,186	1–2	Allsvenskan
29 August 2005	Ullevi	25,843	1–2	Allsvenskan
18 September 2006	Ullevi	13,221	3–2	Allsvenskan
9 August 2009	Gamla Ullevi	11,199	1–2	Allsvenskan

=== Cup ===
Date	Venue	Attendance	Matches			Competition
Date	Venue	Attendance	Team 1	Score	Team 2	Competition
27 July 1969	Ullevi	3,434	Örgryte IS	4–2	IFK Göteborg	Svenska Cupen (round 4)
30 April 1998	Gamla Ullevi	4,074	IFK Göteborg	1–2	Örgryte IS	Svenska Cupen (quarter-final)
11 May 2000	Gamla Ullevi	7,292	IFK Göteborg	2–2 (6–7 apen)	Örgryte IS	Svenska Cupen (semi-final)

=== Other competitions ===
Date	Venue	Attendance	Matches			Competition
Date	Venue	Attendance	Team 1	Score	Team 2	Competition
12 July 1905	Idrottsplatsen	–	Örgryte IS	4–1	IFK Göteborg	Svenska Mästerskapet (qualifying round 1)
30 August 1907	Balders Hage	–	Örgryte IS	8–0	IFK Göteborg	Svenska Mästerskapet (round 1)
3 May 1908	Idrottsplatsen	5,000	IFK Göteborg	2–3	Örgryte IS	Corinthian Bowl (semi-final)
1 May 1909	Walhalla IP	1,000	Örgryte IS	4–1	IFK Göteborg	Corinthian Bowl (semi-final)
26 September 1909	Walhalla IP	4,888	Örgryte IS	3–1	IFK Göteborg	Svenska Mästerskapet (round 2)
8 May 1910	Walhalla IP	–	Örgryte IS	2–0	IFK Göteborg	Corinthian Bowl (semi-final)
1 September 1912	Walhalla IP	3,395	Örgryte IS	4–2	IFK Göteborg	Svenska Mästerskapet (round 2)
6 September 1914	Walhalla IP	3,000 (Note: Also reported as 2,500.)	Örgryte IS	1–1	IFK Göteborg	Svenska Mästerskapet (round 1)
13 September 1914	Walhalla IP	3,500 (Note: Also reported as 3,000.)	IFK Göteborg	1–5	Örgryte IS	Svenska Mästerskapet (round 1 replay)
1 September 1918	Walhalla IP (Note: Also reported as Gamla Ullevi.)	7,070	IFK Göteborg	2–0	Örgryte IS	Svenska Mästerskapet (round 2)
5 August 1920	Gamla Ullevi	5,000	IFK Göteborg	1–1	Örgryte IS	Svenska Mästerskapet (qualifying round 3)
12 August 1920	Walhalla IP	6,000	Örgryte IS	0–2	IFK Göteborg	Svenska Mästerskapet (qualifying round 3 replay)
24 August 1921	Gamla Ullevi (Note: Also reported as Walhalla IP.)	–	Örgryte IS	0–0	IFK Göteborg	Svenska Mästerskapet (round 1)
31 August 1921	Walhalla IP (Note: Also reported as Gamla Ullevi.)	2,500	IFK Göteborg	0–1	Örgryte IS	Svenska Mästerskapet (round 1 replay)

== Records ==
As of 17 September 2017

=== Biggest wins ===
Margin	Match			Date	Competition
Margin	Team 1	Score	Team 2	Date	Competition
8	Örgryte IS	8–0	IFK Göteborg	30 August 1907	Svenska Mästerskapet (round 1)
6	IFK Göteborg	6–0	Örgryte IS	26 November 1916	Svenska Serien
5	Örgryte IS	5–0	IFK Göteborg	2 May 1924	Svenska Serien
5	IFK Göteborg	1–6	Örgryte IS	16 May 1974	Division 2
4	Örgryte IS	4–0	IFK Göteborg	1 October 1905	Göteborgsserien klass 1
4	IFK Göteborg	4–0	Örgryte IS	20 November 1910	Svenska Serien
4	Örgryte IS	2–6	IFK Göteborg	15 October 1911	Svenska Serien
4	IFK Göteborg	1–5	Örgryte IS	13 September 1914	Svenska Mästerskapet (round 1 replay)
4	IFK Göteborg	4–0	Örgryte IS	11 August 1933	Allsvenskan
4	Örgryte IS	1–5	IFK Göteborg	24 September 1964	Allsvenskan
4	IFK Göteborg	4–0	Örgryte IS	9 August 2004	Allsvenskan

=== Highest scoring matches ===
Goals	Match			Date	Competition
Goals	Team 1	Score	Team 2	Date	Competition
9	IFK Göteborg	3–6	Örgryte IS	12 August 1932	Allsvenskan
8	Örgryte IS	8–0	IFK Göteborg	30 August 1907	Svenska Mästerskapet (round 1)
8	Örgryte IS	2–6	IFK Göteborg	15 October 1911	Svenska Serien
8	Örgryte IS	3–5	IFK Göteborg	7 June 1961	Allsvenskan
8	IFK Göteborg	3–5	Örgryte IS	21 May 1964	Allsvenskan
7	Örgryte IS	5–2	IFK Göteborg	8 July 1910	Svenska Serien
7	IFK Göteborg	4–3	Örgryte IS	7 August 1925	Allsvenskan
7	IFK Göteborg	1–6	Örgryte IS	16 May 1974	Division 2
7	IFK Göteborg	2–5	Örgryte IS	11 May 1998	Allsvenskan
7	IFK Göteborg	2–5	Örgryte IS	10 September 2002	Allsvenskan
7	IFK Göteborg	5–2	Örgryte IS	27 May 2003	Allsvenskan

=== Longest win streak ===
Streak	Date		Team
Streak	First match	Last match	Team
9	12 July 1905	8 July 1910	Örgryte IS
5	4 May 1938	11 May 1951	IFK Göteborg
5	25 August 1982	5 September 1984	IFK Göteborg
5	4 May 2004	10 May 2006	IFK Göteborg
4	26 November 1916	1 September 1918	IFK Göteborg
4	20 May 1996	13 September 1997	IFK Göteborg

=== Longest unbeaten streak ===
Streak	Date		Team
Streak	First match	Last match	Team
16	25 October 1914	24 August 1921	IFK Göteborg
10	22 August 1924	24 May 1929	IFK Göteborg
10	2 August 1990	14 April 1997	IFK Göteborg
9	12 July 1905	8 July 1910	Örgryte IS
8	12 June 1968	21 May 1981	Örgryte IS
8	20 October 1998	1 October 2001	IFK Göteborg (Note: The streak includes a match lost after penalty shoot-out.)

=== Highest attendances ===
Attendance	Date	Venue	Home team	Competition
52,194	3 June 1959	Ullevi	IFK Göteborg	Allsvenskan
47,734	30 August 1961	Ullevi	IFK Göteborg	Allsvenskan
46,294	20 August 1959	Ullevi	Örgryte IS	Allsvenskan
42,786	9 June 1960	Ullevi	Örgryte IS	Allsvenskan
42,689	21 May 1964	Ullevi	IFK Göteborg	Allsvenskan
42,386	10 September 2002	Ullevi	IFK Göteborg	Allsvenskan
40,382	27 May 2003	Ullevi	IFK Göteborg	Allsvenskan
40,186	4 May 2004	Ullevi	Örgryte IS	Allsvenskan
40,072	27 August 1981	Ullevi	IFK Göteborg	Allsvenskan
38,563	3 November 1985	Ullevi	Örgryte IS	Allsvenskan play-offs (final)

== Shared player and manager history ==
=== Played for both ===
Player	Played for		Played for		Via
Player	Team	Span	Team	Span	Via
Erik Börjesson	IFK Göteborg	1907–1910	Örgryte IS	1910–1912	Direct
Erik Börjesson	Örgryte IS	1910–1912	IFK Göteborg	1912–1920	Direct
Erik Börjesson	IFK Göteborg	1912–1920	Örgryte IS	1923–1925	Comeback
Gunnar Gren	IFK Göteborg	1941–1949	Örgryte IS	1956–1957	A.C. Milan; A.C. Fiorentina; Genoa C.F.C.
Ralf Edström	IFK Göteborg	1977–1979	Örgryte IS	1983–1985	Standard Liège; AS Monaco FC
Bengt Andersson	Örgryte IS	1993–1996	IFK Göteborg	1998–2007	CD Tenerife
Bengt Andersson	IFK Göteborg	1998–2007	Örgryte IS	2009–2010; 2013	Tölö IF
Jonathan Azulay	IFK Göteborg	2011–2014	Örgryte IS	2013	Direct (on loan)

=== Played for one, managed one ===
Torbjörn Nilsson is the current caretaker assistant manager of IFK Göteborg, but has only had the head manager role for Örgryte IS.

Player/manager	Played for		Managed	
Player/manager	Team	Span	Team	Span
Torbjörn Nilsson	IFK Göteborg	1975–1976; 1977–1982; 1984–1986	Örgryte IS	1991–93

=== Played for both, managed one ===
Player/manager	Played for		Managed	
Player/manager	Team	Span	Team	Span
Erik Börjesson	IFK Göteborg Örgryte IS	1907–1910; 1912–1920; 1910–1912; 1923–1925	Örgryte IS	1923–1925
Conny Karlsson	IFK Göteborg; Örgryte IS	1975–1982; 1985–1987	Örgryte IS	1989–1990

=== Played for one, managed both ===
Player/manager	Played for		Managed	
Player/manager	Team	Span	Team	Span
Nils Berghamn	Örgryte IS	1947–1952	IFK Göteborg; Örgryte IS	1975–1976; 1977–1978

=== Played for both, managed both ===
Player/manager	Played for		Managed	
Player/manager	Team	Span	Team	Span
Gunnar Gren	IFK Göteborg; Örgryte IS	1941–1949; 1956–1957	Örgryte IS; IFK Göteborg	1956–1959; 1960

=== Managed both ===
Manager	Managed		Managed	
Manager	Team	Span	Team	Span
Walter Probst	IFK Göteborg	1954–1959	Örgryte IS	1964–1965
Gunnar Gren	Örgryte IS	1956–1959	IFK Göteborg	1960
Yngve Brodd	IFK Göteborg	1963–1966	Örgryte IS	1973
