= IFK Göteborg–Malmö FF rivalry =

Association football rivalry in Sweden

Mesta Mästarmötet
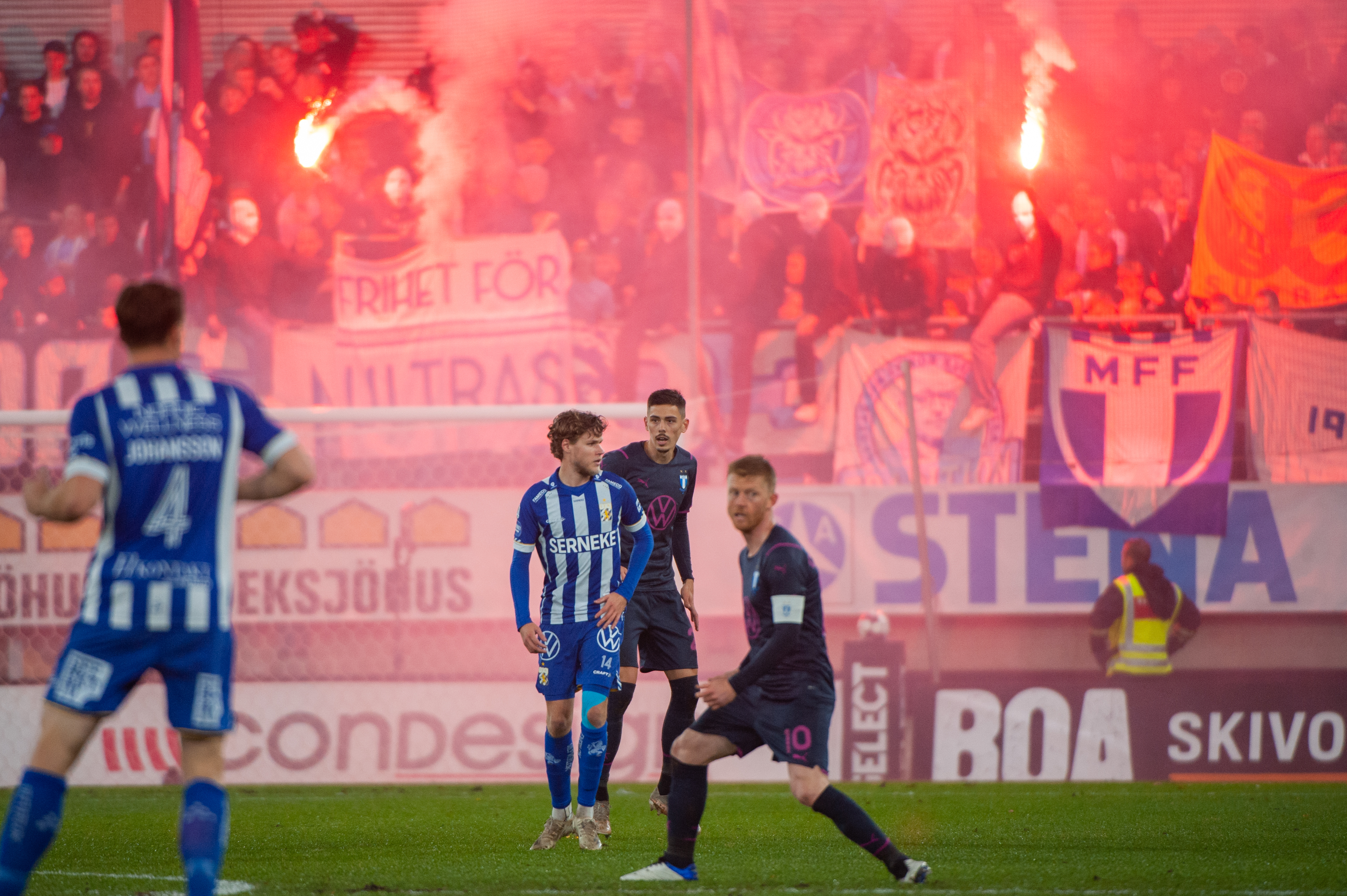
- IFK Göteborg and Malmö FF in the 2022 Allsvenskan
- Location: Gothenburg and Malmö
- Teams: IFK Göteborg; Malmö FF
- First meeting: 18 June 1922; Svenska Serien; IFK Göteborg 5–0 Malmö FF
- Latest meeting: 24 August 2025; Allsvenskan; Malmö FF 0–0 IFK Göteborg
- Next meeting: TBD

Statistics
- Total meetings: Competitive: 191
- Most wins: Malmö FF (82)
- All-time series: IFK Göteborg: 66; Drawn: 43; Malmö FF: 82
- Largest victory: 11 September 1949; Allsvenskan; IFK Göteborg 2–9 Malmö FF

Although not technically a derby, the fixture between IFK Göteborg and Malmö FF is one of the fiercest sporting rivalries in Swedish football, sometimes referred to as the "Mesta mästarmötet" (English: Clash of the greatest champions).

The two clubs are the most successful in Swedish football; Malmö FF have won 24 Swedish championship titles, an all time Swedish record, while IFK Göteborg have won 18 titles.

The two clubs top the All-time Allsvenskan table with Malmö FF being 208 points ahead of IFK Göteborg after the conclusion of the 2024 season. Together they have won 42 Swedish championships, 40 Allsvenskan titles and 24 Svenska Cupen titles. Only AIK have played more seasons in Allsvenskan than the two clubs.

The two clubs are also the only Swedish clubs to have reached the final of European competition, IFK Göteborg won the UEFA Cup in 1981–82 and again in 1986–87 while Malmö FF were runners-up in the 1978–79 European Cup.

== Shared player history ==
=== Transfers ===
The two lists are incomplete.

There have been few direct transfers between the rivals, the most recent transfer was on 12 January 2018.

Date	Name	From	To
22 January 2003	Jon Inge Høiland	IFK Göteborg	Malmö FF
17 November 2003	Peter Ijeh	Malmö FF	IFK Göteborg
14 July 2005	Thomas Olsson	Malmö FF	IFK Göteborg
12 January 2018	Søren Rieks	IFK Göteborg	Malmö FF

There have also been a few players who have played for both clubs although transferred via another club.

Name	From	Period	Via	To	Period
Robert Prytz	Malmö FF	1977–1982; 1993–1995	Rangers	IFK Göteborg	1985–1986
Dan Corneliusson	IFK Göteborg	1978–1983	Stuttgart; Como; FC Wettingen	Malmö FF	1990–1992
Joakim Persson	Malmö FF	1992–1996	Atalanta	IFK Göteborg	1998–1999
Mats Lilienberg	IFK Göteborg	1995–1996	Halmstads BK	Malmö FF	2000–2002
Mathias Ranégie	IFK Göteborg	2007–2008	BK Häcken; Go Ahead Eagles	Malmö FF	2011–2012
Tobias Sana	IFK Göteborg	2009–2012; 2019–2022	Ajax	Malmö FF	2015–2017
Simon Thern	Malmö FF	2012–2014	Heerenveen; AIK; IFK Norrköping	IFK Göteborg	2021-2023

=== Played for one, managed the other ===
Manager	Played for		Managed	
Manager	Team	Span	Team	Span
Roland Nilsson	IFK Göteborg	1983–1989	Malmö FF	2008–2011
Michael Andersson	IFK Göteborg	1986–1988	Malmö FF	2000–2001

=== Managed both clubs ===
Manager	IFK Göteborg career						Malmö FF career					
Manager	Span	G^{1}	W	D	L	Win %	Span	G^{1}	W	D	L	Win %
(Austria) Josef Stroh	1959–1960	33	18	6	9	54.5	1955–1958	87	44	21	22	50.6
(Sweden) Roland Nilsson	2020–2021	23	7	10	6	30.4	2008–2011	109	54	24	31	49.5

^{1} Only competitive matches are counted.

== Statistics ==
	IFK Göteborg wins	Draws	Malmö FF wins
League	64	43	72
Svenska Cupen	2	0	9
Svenska Supercupen	0	0	1
Total	66	43	82

Table correct as of 24 August 2025

== Last five head-to-head fixtures ==
Date	Home team	Score	Away team	Venue	Competition
13 May 2024	IFK Göteborg	0–3	Malmö FF	Gamla Ullevi	Allsvenskan
28 October 2024	Malmö FF	2–1	IFK Göteborg	Stadion	Allsvenskan
16 March 2025	Malmö FF	3–2 (a.e.t.)	IFK Göteborg	Stadion	Svenska Cupen
25 May 2025	IFK Göteborg	1–0	Malmö FF	Gamla Ullevi	Allsvenskan
24 August 2025	Malmö FF	0–0	IFK Göteborg	Stadion	Allsvenskan

== Honours ==
Team	Allsvenskan	Svenska Cupen	Supercupen	Total
Malmö FF	27	16	2	45
IFK Göteborg	13	8	1	22
Combined	40	24	3	67

Table correct as of 16 March 2025

== All-time results ==
=== IFK Göteborg in the league at home ===
Date	Venue	Attendance	Score	Competition
18 June 1922	Gamla Ullevi	3,321	5–0	Svenska Serien
1 May 1932	Gamla Ullevi	11,573	6–1	Allsvenskan
11 September 1932	Gamla Ullevi	7,869	7–2	Allsvenskan
3 September 1933	Gamla Ullevi	7,258	5–0	Allsvenskan
15 November 1936	Gamla Ullevi	9,540	2–1	Allsvenskan
24 October 1937	Gamla Ullevi	5,507	1–2	Allsvenskan
12 November 1939	Gamla Ullevi	6,729	1–0	Allsvenskan
27 April 1941	Gamla Ullevi	7,597	0–0	Allsvenskan
3 May 1942	Gamla Ullevi	6,781	2–0	Allsvenskan
26 April 1943	Gamla Ullevi	11,173	1–1	Allsvenskan
5 September 1943	Gamla Ullevi	16,969	1–1	Allsvenskan
3 June 1945	Gamla Ullevi	6,865	0–6	Allsvenskan
2 September 1945	Gamla Ullevi	18,601	3–1	Allsvenskan
4 August 1946	Gamla Ullevi	18,474	0–0	Allsvenskan
27 July 1947	Gamla Ullevi	13,221	3–0	Allsvenskan
29 August 1948	Gamla Ullevi	20,596	4–4	Allsvenskan
11 September 1949	Gamla Ullevi	19,565	2–9	Allsvenskan
14 October 1951	Gamla Ullevi	28,902	2–1	Allsvenskan
16 November 1952	Gamla Ullevi	10,728	1–4	Allsvenskan
11 October 1953	Gamla Ullevi	17,688	1–0	Allsvenskan
1 August 1954	Gamla Ullevi	16,604	0–1	Allsvenskan
23 October 1955	Gamla Ullevi	27,871	1–1	Allsvenskan
2 September 1956	Gamla Ullevi	25,943	5–3	Allsvenskan
8 August 1957	Gamla Ullevi	16,321	2–5	Allsvenskan
3 May 1959	Gamla Ullevi	22,629	3–1	Allsvenskan
22 May 1960	Ullevi	19,701	1–1	Allsvenskan
8 October 1961	Ullevi	9,777	2–3	Allsvenskan
26 August 1962	Ullevi	16,740	1–2	Allsvenskan
18 August 1963	Ullevi	11,465	1–2	Allsvenskan
14 June 1964	Ullevi	12,326	2–6	Allsvenskan
11 May 1965	Ullevi	19,797	2–2	Allsvenskan
26 May 1966	Ullevi	10,767	0–0	Allsvenskan
20 April 1967	Ullevi	9,999	4–2	Allsvenskan
29 September 1968	Ullevi	11,599	2–3	Allsvenskan
21 September 1969	Ullevi	27,241	3–1	Allsvenskan
3 May 1970	Ullevi	17,875	1–2	Allsvenskan
19 September 1977	Ullevi	28,816	0–1	Allsvenskan
4 May 1978	Ullevi	30,569	0–1	Allsvenskan
13 September 1979	Ullevi	19,731	1–1	Allsvenskan
14 September 1980	Ullevi	11,544	0–0	Allsvenskan
5 August 1981	Ullevi	14,367	4–1	Allsvenskan
2 September 1982	Ullevi	5,971	1–1	Allsvenskan
24 October 1982	Ullevi	5,893	5–1	Allsvenskan play-offs (SF, leg 2)
10 September 1983	Ullevi	10,613	6–1	Allsvenskan
13 May 1984	Ullevi	10,725	1–1	Allsvenskan
3 July 1985	Ullevi	16,157	0–1	Allsvenskan
20 October 1985	Ullevi	26,771	2–1	Allsvenskan play-offs (SF, leg 1)
5 October 1986	Ullevi	9,501	0–1	Allsvenskan
22 August 1987	Ullevi	10,782	1–2	Allsvenskan
24 October 1987	Ullevi	14,811	1–0	Allsvenskan play-offs (Final, leg 1)
29 May 1988	Ullevi	9,876	1–3	Allsvenskan
16 April 1989	Ullevi	4,795	1–1	Allsvenskan
30 July 1990	Ullevi	6,330	0–0	Allsvenskan
11 August 1991	Ullevi	5,056	0–0	Allsvenskan
6 October 1991	Ullevi	3,833	0–1	Mästerskapsserien
5 April 1992	Gamla Ullevi	9,023	3–0	Allsvenskan
17 October 1992	Gamla Ullevi	1,676	2–0	Mästerskapsserien
2 October 1993	Gamla Ullevi	7,035	5–1	Allsvenskan
9 May 1994	Gamla Ullevi	8,554	3–4	Allsvenskan
17 September 1995	Gamla Ullevi	10,918	2–1	Allsvenskan
21 April 1996	Gamla Ullevi	11,657	0–0	Allsvenskan
28 June 1997	Gamla Ullevi	10,091	1–1	Allsvenskan
4 June 1998	Gamla Ullevi	6,456	1–0	Allsvenskan
2 August 1999	Gamla Ullevi	8,555	1–0	Allsvenskan
17 September 2001	Gamla Ullevi	9,089	4–0	Allsvenskan
23 July 2002	Gamla Ullevi	10,471	0–4	Allsvenskan
14 April 2003	Gamla Ullevi	11,906	3–0	Allsvenskan
25 October 2004	Ullevi	38,983	1–2	Allsvenskan
26 September 2005	Ullevi	15,253	2–1	Allsvenskan
14 May 2006	Gamla Ullevi	10,517	1–0	Allsvenskan
2 July 2007	Ullevi	11,270	1–2	Allsvenskan
2 August 2008	Ullevi	8,015	2–0	Allsvenskan
25 May 2009	Gamla Ullevi	15,267	2–0	Allsvenskan
29 April 2010	Gamla Ullevi	11,206	0–2	Allsvenskan
11 September 2011	Gamla Ullevi	11,640	0–0	Allsvenskan
14 May 2012	Gamla Ullevi	12,549	2–2	Allsvenskan
25 April 2013	Gamla Ullevi	17,063	1–1	Allsvenskan
7 April 2014	Gamla Ullevi	17,073	0–3	Allsvenskan
12 April 2015	Gamla Ullevi	16,894	0–1	Allsvenskan
27 April 2016	Gamla Ullevi	15,748	0–3^{1}	Allsvenskan
1 April 2017	Ullevi	32,129	1–1	Allsvenskan
4 November 2018	Gamla Ullevi	13,073	0–3	Allsvenskan
16 May 2019	Gamla Ullevi	17,083	0–0	Allsvenskan
2 August 2020	Gamla Ullevi	0^{2}	0–3	Allsvenskan
7 November 2021	Gamla Ullevi	16,781	0–2	Allsvenskan
17 October 2022	Gamla Ullevi	14,011	2–1	Allsvenskan
17 April 2023	Gamla Ullevi	17,051	0–1	Allsvenskan
13 May 2024	Gamla Ullevi	17,316	0–3	Allsvenskan
25 May 2025	Gamla Ullevi	16,284	1–0	Allsvenskan

IFK Göteborg wins	Malmö FF wins	Draws
34	32	23

=== Malmö FF in the league at home ===
Date	Venue	Attendance	Score	Competition
29 October 1922	Malmö IP	961	0–1	Svenska Serien
2 August 1931	Malmö IP	6,236	0–1	Allsvenskan
28 August 1932	Malmö IP	6,648	0–5	Allsvenskan
15 October 1933	Malmö IP	7,834	1–3	Allsvenskan
4 April 1937	Malmö IP	6,790	5–4	Allsvenskan
10 October 1937	Malmö IP	7,917	2–0	Allsvenskan
3 September 1939	Malmö IP	4,914	1–1	Allsvenskan
4 August 1940	Malmö IP	8,434	3–3	Allsvenskan
14 June 1942	Malmö IP	11,596	2–0	Allsvenskan
18 October 1942	Malmö IP	6,795	0–0	Allsvenskan
21 May 1944	Malmö IP	14,007	3–1	Allsvenskan
30 July 1944	Malmö IP	13,112	4–0	Allsvenskan
26 May 1946	Malmö IP	13,297	1–1	Allsvenskan
15 May 1947	Malmö IP	7,791	6–0	Allsvenskan
18 April 1948	Malmö IP	14,750	4–3	Allsvenskan
24 April 1949	Malmö IP	17,319	3–1	Allsvenskan
4 June 1950	Malmö IP	15,473	6–3	Allsvenskan
4 May 1952	Malmö IP	13,005	2–1	Allsvenskan
12 April 1953	Malmö IP	14,734	1–0	Allsvenskan
25 October 1953	Malmö IP	14,478	0–2	Allsvenskan
10 June 1955	Malmö IP	13,001	0–2	Allsvenskan
15 April 1956	Malmö IP	15,396	5–0	Allsvenskan
14 April 1957	Malmö IP	13,070	2–0	Allsvenskan
15 August 1957	Malmö IP	11,704	1–2	Allsvenskan
21 September 1958	Malmö Stadion	10,691	5–3	Allsvenskan
27 September 1959	Malmö Stadion	19,259	2–3	Allsvenskan
2 October 1960	Malmö Stadion	5,951	3–1	Allsvenskan
23 April 1961	Malmö Stadion	13,326	0–3	Allsvenskan
31 May 1962	Malmö Stadion	6,319	1–1	Allsvenskan
25 April 1963	Malmö Stadion	9,667	1–1	Allsvenskan
6 August 1964	Malmö Stadion	12,773	3–0	Allsvenskan
24 October 1965	Malmö Stadion	25,009	3–0	Allsvenskan
4 September 1966	Malmö Stadion	6,985	1–2	Allsvenskan
22 October 1967	Malmö Stadion	11,150	2–2	Allsvenskan
5 May 1968	Malmö Stadion	12,261	1–1	Allsvenskan
29 May 1969	Malmö Stadion	17,381	1–0	Allsvenskan
11 October 1970	Malmö Stadion	12,643	2–0	Allsvenskan
22 June 1977	Malmö Stadion	24,130	1–0	Allsvenskan
22 October 1978	Malmö Stadion	6,494	1–0	Allsvenskan
21 June 1979	Malmö Stadion	9,085	0–4	Allsvenskan
11 June 1980	Malmö Stadion	15,360	2–2	Allsvenskan
10 May 1981	Malmö Stadion	10,843	0–2	Allsvenskan
6 June 1982	Malmö Stadion	20,506	1–1	Allsvenskan
17 October 1982	Malmö Stadion	5,606	0–3	Allsvenskan play-offs (SF, leg 1)
2 June 1983	Malmö Stadion	22,015	3–2	Allsvenskan
26 August 1984	Malmö Stadion	15,781	0–1	Allsvenskan
12 May 1985	Malmö Stadion	16,200	2–1	Allsvenskan
27 October 1985	Malmö Stadion	18,627	0–2	Allsvenskan play-offs (SF, leg 2)
27 April 1986	Malmö Stadion	13,349	1–1	Allsvenskan
16 August 1987	Malmö Stadion	19,226	2–1	Allsvenskan
31 October 1987	Malmö Stadion	18,811	2–1	Allsvenskan play-offs (Final, leg 2)
9 October 1988	Malmö Stadion	4,717	1–3	Allsvenskan
20 August 1989	Malmö Stadion	6,933	3–0	Allsvenskan
23 September 1990	Malmö Stadion	3,890	0–2	Allsvenskan
7 April 1991	Malmö Stadion	7,131	1–1	Allsvenskan
1 September 1991	Malmö Stadion	6,512	1–2	Mästerskapsserien
29 June 1992	Malmö Stadion	6,223	1–0	Allsvenskan
16 August 1992	Malmö Stadion	4,017	2–1	Mästerskapsserien
24 April 1993	Malmö Stadion	4,948	0–1	Allsvenskan
23 October 1994	Malmö Stadion	25,531	1–2	Allsvenskan
18 May 1995	Malmö Stadion	7,050	1–1	Allsvenskan
15 September 1996	Malmö Stadion	7,800	1–3	Allsvenskan
21 July 1997	Malmö Stadion	13,597	1–1	Allsvenskan
1 August 1998	Malmö Stadion	7,105	3–1	Allsvenskan
22 June 1999	Malmö Stadion	12,975	1–1	Allsvenskan
14 May 2001	Malmö Stadion	12,109	0–6	Allsvenskan
15 September 2002	Malmö Stadion	11,972	4–2	Allsvenskan
19 October 2003	Malmö Stadion	17,923	1–3	Allsvenskan
24 April 2004	Malmö Stadion	26,426	1–0	Allsvenskan
10 April 2005	Malmö Stadion	26,504	1–2	Allsvenskan
30 October 2006	Malmö Stadion	9,514	2–1	Allsvenskan
6 October 2007	Malmö Stadion	11,219	0–2	Allsvenskan
31 March 2008	Malmö Stadion	18,884	1–1	Allsvenskan
19 October 2009	Stadion	18,293	0–1	Allsvenskan
26 September 2010	Stadion	18,125	2–1	Allsvenskan
2 May 2011	Stadion	17,221	0–2	Allsvenskan
27 September 2012	Stadion	15,109	1–2	Allsvenskan
25 August 2013	Stadion	23,142	3–1	Allsvenskan
10 August 2014	Stadion	18,838	2–2	Allsvenskan
9 August 2015	Stadion	21,127	2–1	Allsvenskan
12 September 2016	Stadion	21,273	3–1	Allsvenskan
27 August 2017	Stadion	21,354	2–2	Allsvenskan
7 May 2018	Stadion	17,715	1–2	Allsvenskan
6 October 2019	Stadion	18,473	1–0	Allsvenskan
25 October 2020	Stadion	0^{2}	3–1	Allsvenskan
14 August 2021	Stadion	5,652^{3}	2–3	Allsvenskan
25 April 2022	Stadion	19,785	1–0	Allsvenskan
3 September 2023	Stadion	20,907	2–2	Allsvenskan
28 October 2024	Stadion	21,258	2–1	Allsvenskan
24 August 2025	Stadion	20,597	0–0	Allsvenskan

Malmö FF wins	IFK Göteborg wins	Draws
40	30	20

^{1} Awarded 0-3 after the original match had been suspended with the score at a 0–0 as a result of a spectator scandal.
^{2} The match was played behind closed doors due to the COVID-19 pandemic in Sweden.
^{3} The match was played with limited capacity due to the COVID-19 pandemic in Sweden.

=== Results at home in Cup matches ===
Date	Venue	Attendance	Matches			Competition
Date	Venue	Attendance	Team 1	Score	Team 2	Competition
28 June 1970	Malmö Stadion	3,611	Malmö FF	2–1	IFK Göteborg	Svenska Cupen (preliminary round)
8 November 1975	Malmö Stadion	2,799	Malmö FF	2–1 (a.e.t)	IFK Göteborg	Svenska Cupen (quarter-final)
29 October 1977	Ullevi	11,997	IFK Göteborg	2–3 (a.e.t)	Malmö FF	Svenska Cupen (round 6)
9 May 1984	Malmö Stadion	8,833	Malmö FF	4–1	IFK Göteborg	Svenska Cupen (quarter-final)
7 June 1989	Ullevi	4,411	IFK Göteborg	0–2	Malmö FF	Svenska Cupen (semi-final)
6 May 1999	Malmö Stadion	4,676	Malmö FF	1–2 (g.g)	IFK Göteborg	Svenska Cupen (semi-final)
27 April 2001	Gamla Ullevi	5,528	IFK Göteborg	1–2	Malmö FF	Svenska Cupen (quarter-final)
10 November 2013	Stadion	2,787	Malmö FF	3–2	IFK Göteborg	Svenska Supercupen
10 March 2018	Malmö IP	4,135	Malmö FF	1–0	IFK Göteborg	Svenska Cupen (quarter-final)
30 July 2020	Gamla Ullevi	0^{1}	IFK Göteborg	2–1 (a.e.t)	Malmö FF	Svenska Cupen (Final)
16 March 2025	Stadion	20,742	Malmö FF	3–2 (a.e.t)	IFK Göteborg	Svenska Cupen (semi-final)

Malmö FF wins	IFK Göteborg wins
9	2

^{1} The match was played behind closed doors due to the COVID-19 pandemic in Sweden.

=== Results at neutral venues ===
Date	Venue	Attendance	Matches			Competition
Date	Venue	Attendance	Team 1	Score	Team 2	Competition
2 July 1986	Råsunda	11,656	Malmö FF	2–1	IFK Göteborg	Svenska Cupen (Final)

Malmö FF wins	IFK Göteborg wins
1	0
