= 1898 in Swedish football =

The 1898 season in Swedish association football, starting January 1898 and ending December 1898:

== Honours ==
=== Official titles ===
Title	Team	Reason
Swedish Champions 1898	AIK	Winners of Svenska Mästerskapet

=== Competitions ===
Level	Competition	Team
Championship Cup	Svenska Mästerskapet 1898	AIK

== Domestic results ==
=== Svenska Mästerskapet 1898 ===
Final

30 July 1898

Örgryte IS	3–0	AIK

Ladugårdsgärdet, Stockholm
