= Stefan Andreasson =

Swedish footballer

Personal information
- Full name: Stefan Andreasson
- Date of birth: 14 December 1968 (age 57)
- Place of birth: Borås, Sweden
- Position: Midfielder

Senior career*
Years	Team	Apps	(Gls)
1988–1997	Elfsborg	67	(15)
1997–1998	Como Calcio	15	(2)
1998–2001	Elfsborg	46	(6)
Total		128	(23)
- * Club domestic league appearances and goals

Stefan Andreasson (born 14 December 1968) is a former football player and since 2008 Director for the Allsvenskan football club IF Elfsborg.

== Playing career ==
Andreasson played almost his entire career from 1988 and 2001 for Elfsborg except for a short time as a professional in the Italian football club Como Calcio 1997 / 98. Overall Andreasson played 1292 matches for Elfsborg, of which 435 were in the first team, including 73 games in the Allsvenskan.

== Post-playing career ==
1999 Andreasson took over as sporting director in Elfsborg. He has been in the role of sporting director considered to be an important part of Elfsborg success during the second half of the 2000s, with victory in the Allsvenskan 2006 as the greatest success. He was behind recruitments of including Anders Svensson, Mathias Svensson and Stefan Ishizaki.

== Personal life ==
Andreasson's son Anton currently plays for IF Elfsborg.
