= Michael Parker (footballer) =

English footballer (born 2004)

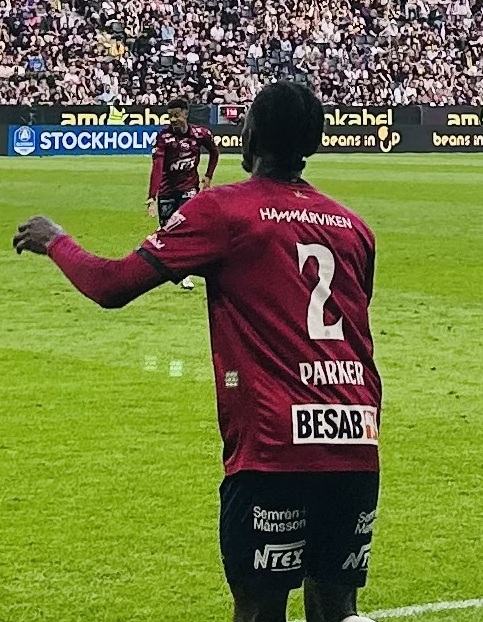
- Parker playing for Örgryte IS in 2026

Personal information
- Full name: Michael Parker
- Date of birth: 18 December 2004 (age 21)
- Place of birth: Greenwich, England
- Height: 6 ft 4 in (1.93 m)
- Position: Defender

Team information
- Current team: Örgryte IS
- Number: 2

Youth career
- –2021: Cray Valley Paper Mills
- 2021–2023: Huddersfield Town
- 2023: Shrewsbury Town
- 2024: Burnley
- 2024–2026: West Bromwich Albion

Senior career*
Years	Team	Apps	(Gls)
2025–2026	West Bromwich Albion	0	(0)
2025	→ Hereford (loan)	10	(1)
2026–	Örgryte IS	21	(0)
- * Club domestic league appearances and goals as of 21:24, 22 September 2026 (UTC)

Michael Parker (born 18 December 2004) is an English professional footballer who plays as a defender for Allsvenskan club Örgryte IS.

== Career ==
=== Early career ===
Parker played youth football for Cray Valley Paper Mills up to under-16 level, before joining the Huddersfield Town as a first-year scholar in May 2021. He was released by the club after two years in May 2023. Parker quickly found a new club, joining the academy of EFL League One club Shrewsbury Town later that month after impressing on trial, although his contract was terminated by mutual consent just over three months later. He subsequently found himself without a club for five months until, in February 2024, he signed for Burnley on a contract until the end of the season. He was released by the club after three months in May 2024. In September 2024, Parker signed a one-year contract with West Bromwich Albion. Towards the end of the 2024–25 season, he was named as a substitute for the first team in two Championship fixtures, but did not feature in either. In July 2025, Parker signed a new two-year contract with the club.

On 30 August 2025, Parker joined National League North club Hereford on a 28-day loan. He made his debut the same day, in what would be his first full senior legue appearance in football, in a 2–0 league win at home against Alfreton Town. He returned to his parent club at the end of his loan spell, but returned to Hereford on a two-month loan on 18 October 2025, but was recalled on 21 November, before the end of his loan spell.

=== Örgryte IS ===
On 2 February 2026, Parker moved to Sweden to join newly-promoted Allsvenskan club Örgryte IS, after impressing during a two-week trial.

== Style of play ==
Parker has been described as "quick, left-footed", "a big lad" and "can play as a left-back, centre-back or left wing-back" by his former academy directory at Shrewsbury, David Longwell.

== Personal life ==
Parker played Gaelic Football from the ages of 12 to 15.

== Career statistics ==
As of match played 19 September 2026

Appearances and goals by club, season and competition
Club	Season	League			National cup (Note: Includes FA Cup, Svenska Cupen)		EFL Cup		Other		Total	
Club	Season	Division	Apps	Goals	Apps	Goals	Apps	Goals	Apps	Goals	Apps	Goals
West Bromwich Albion	2024–25	Championship	0	0	0	0	0	0	0	0	0	0
West Bromwich Albion U21	2024–25	—			—		—		4 (Note: Appearances in National League Cup)	0	4	0
West Bromwich Albion U21	2025–26	—			—		—		2	0	2	0
West Bromwich Albion U21	Total		0	0	0	0	0	0	6	0	6	0
Hereford (loan)	2025–26	National League North	10	1	0	0	—		1 (Note: Appearance in FA Trophy)	0	11	1
Örgryte IS	2026	Allsvenskan	21	0	0	0	—		—		21	0
Career total			31	1	0	0	0	0	7	0	38	1
