= Anton Andreasson =

Swedish footballer

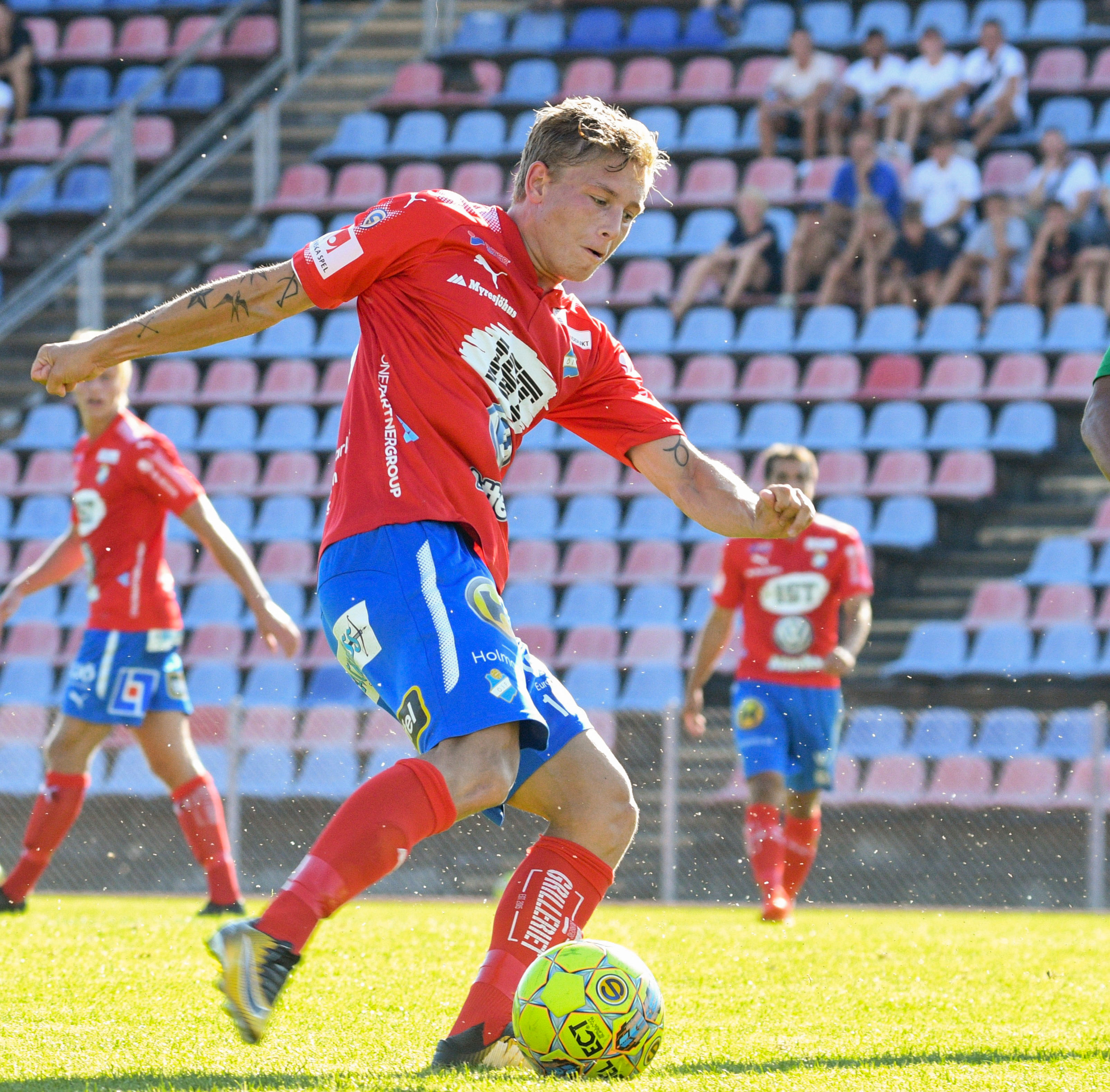

Personal information
- Full name: Anton Stefan Andreasson
- Date of birth: 26 July 1993 (age 33)
- Place of birth: Sweden
- Height: 1.75 m (5 ft 9 in)
- Position: Midfielder

Team information
- Current team: Örgryte IS
- Number: 19

Youth career
- –2013: IF Elfsborg

Senior career*
Years	Team	Apps	(Gls)
2014–2016	IF Elfsborg	8	(0)
2016–2017	Pro Patria	2	(0)
2017–2018	Jönköpings Södra	0	(0)
2018–2019	Östers IF	32	(1)
2020–	Örgryte IS	172	(17)
- * Club domestic league appearances and goals as of 8 July 2026

Anton Andreasson (born 26 July 1993) is a Swedish footballer who plays as a midfielder for Örgryte IS. He is the son of former IF Elfsborg and Como midfielder Stefan Andreasson, who since 1999 serves as the director of IF Elfsborg.
