= Erla Steina Arnardóttir =

Icelandic footballer

Personal information
- Full name: Erla Steina Arnardóttir
- Date of birth: 18 May 1983 (age 43)
- Place of birth: Iceland
- Position: Midfielder

Senior career*
Years	Team	Apps	(Gls)
2002	Breiðablik	12	(7)
2003–2004	Sunnanå SK		
2004	Stattena IF		
2005–2006	Mallbackens IF		
2007	Jersey Sky Blue		
2007–2011	Kristianstads DFF		

International career^{‡}
1999–2000	Sweden U-17	2	(0)
2002–2006	Iceland U-21	13	(1)
2004–2009	Iceland	40	(2)
- * Club domestic league appearances and goals as of 16 August 2009 ‡ National team caps and goals as of 24 October 2009

Erla Steina Arnardóttir (born 16 May 1983) is a retired Icelandic footballer who last played for Swedish Damallsvenskan club Kristianstads DFF. Erla Steina was part of Iceland's national team and competed in UEFA Women's Euro 2009. She played one season in the W-League with Jersey Sky Blue.
