= Gunnar Larsson (sports administrator) =

Swedish sports manager and politician (1940–2020)

13th Chairman of IFK Göteborg
- In office 1982–2000
- Preceded by: Bertil Westblad
- Succeeded by: Kurt Eliasson

Personal details
- Born: Gunnar Larsson; 29 March 1940 Gothenburg, Sweden
- Died: 4 May 2020 (aged 80) Gothenburg, Sweden
- Occupation: Politician
- Profession: Lawyer

Gunnar Larsson (29 March 1940 – 4 May 2020) was a Swedish football and sports administrator, and politician. He was chairman of the Swedish football club IFK Göteborg from 1982 to 2000, during which the club won the Swedish championships ten times, Svenska Cupen three times, the UEFA Cup twice, first in 1981–82 and again in 1986–87, reached the semi-finals in the 1985–86 European Cup, and participated in four UEFA Champions League group stages.

== Life and career ==
His father Torild Larsson played 117 matches for IFK Göteborg, and Gunnar represented the club on youth level, before playing for Lundby IF, where he also was chairman before being elected chairman for IFK Göteborg in 1982. He was also engaged in the Gothenburg Gymnastics Association (Göteborgs gymnastikförbund), and after left the board of IFK Göteborg he was president of the Swedish Sports Confederation, the umbrella organisation of the Swedish sports movement, from 2001 to 2005. He remained at IFK Göteborg as chairman of the election committee, and was awarded the title of honorary chairman.

He was active as a politician for the Swedish Social Democratic Party, first entering the Gothenburg municipal council in 1973. In 1976 he started working full-time as a politician, first as municipal commissioner, and from 1982 to 1985 chairman of the municipal council and as such the mayor of Gothenburg. Larsson has also been chairman of the Swedish pension fund Andra AP-Fonden and the Gothenburg opera house.

Larsson was sometimes called "Father Gunnar" ("Fader Gunnar") for his sharpness, knowledge and strong lead of IFK Göteborg. Former IFK player Torbjörn Nilsson called him a father figure, and saying that "he was IFK Göteborg". Larsson has also been referred to as the most successful club leader in Swedish football history.

Larsson died from COVID-19 on 4 May 2020, during the COVID-19 pandemic in Sweden at the age of 80.

== Honours and trophies won by IFK Göteborg during presidency ==
- Swedish Champions
  - Winners (10): 1982, 1983, 1984, 1987, 1990, 1991, 1993, 1994, 1995, 1996
- Allsvenskan:
  - Winners (8): 1982, 1984, 1990, 1991, 1993, 1994, 1995, 1996
  - Runners-up (3): 1986, 1988, 1997
- Mästerskapsserien:
  - Winners (1): 1991
- Svenska Cupen:
  - Winners (3): 1981–82, 1982–83, 1991
  - Runners-up (2): 1985–86, 1998–99
- Allsvenskan play-offs:
  - Winners (5): 1982, 1983, 1984, 1987, 1990
  - Runners-up (1): 1985
- UEFA Cup:
  - Winners (2): 1981–82, 1986–87
- European Cup/UEFA Champions League:
  - Semi-finals (2): 1985–86, 1992–93
  - Quarter-finals (3): 1984–85, 1988–89, 1994–95
