= 1897 in Swedish football =

The 1897 season in Swedish football, starting January 1897 and ending December 1897:

== Honours ==
=== Official titles ===
Title	Team	Reason
Swedish Champions 1897	Örgryte IS	Winners of Svenska Mästerskapet

=== Competitions ===
Level	Competition	Team
Championship Cup	Svenska Mästerskapet 1897	Örgryte IS

== Domestic results ==
=== Svenska Mästerskapet 1897 ===
Final

5 September 1897

Örgryte IS	1–0	Örgryte IS 2

Idrottsplatsen, Gothenburg
