= List of Örgryte IS players =

== Players ==
Matches of current players as of 27 March 2014.

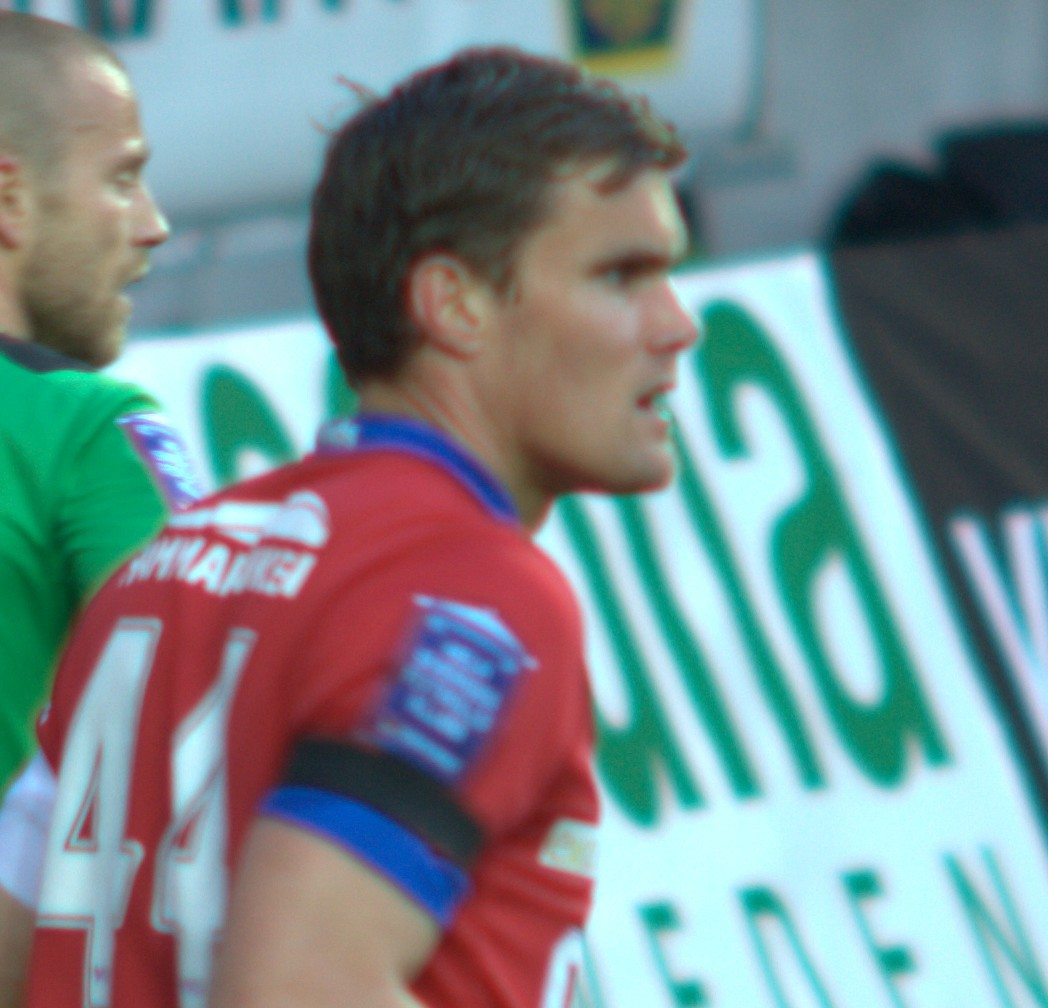
David Leinar has made 125 league appearances for Örgryte IS.

Name	Nationality	Position	Örgryte career	League apps	League goals	Total apps	Total goals
Magnus Källander	Sweden	MF	1996–2003; 2004–2010	292	15		
Niclas Sjöstedt	Sweden	DF	1987–2000	261			
Sven Andersson	Sweden	GK	1980–1991	247	0		
Marcus Allbäck	Sweden	FW	1992–1997; 1998–2000; 2008–2009; 2011	203	88		
Dick Last	Sweden	GK	2000–2008	198	0		
Örjan Persson	Sweden	MF	1961–1964; 1971–1974	168	24		
Markus Johannesson	Sweden	DF	1997–2004	164	11		
Agne Simonsson	Sweden	FW	1959–1960; 1963–1970	162	105		
Valter Tomaz Júnior	Brazil	DF	1998–2006; 2010–2011	157	3		
David Leinar	Sweden	DF	2009–	125	18		
Bengt Andersson	Sweden	GK	1993–1996; 2009	114	0		
Boyd Mwila	Zambia	FW	2003–2009	112	23		
