= 1914–15 Svenska Serien =

Svenska Serien
- Season: 1914–15

Svenska Serien 1914–15, part of the 1914–15 Swedish football season, was the fifth Svenska Serien season played. IFK Göteborg won the league ahead of runners-up AIK.

== League table ==
Pos	Team	Pld	W	D	L	GF	GA	GR	Pts
1	IFK Göteborg (C)	8	6	0	2	25	11	2.273	12
2	AIK	8	5	0	3	30	15	2.000	10
3	Örgryte IS	8	5	0	3	22	18	1.222	10
4	Djurgårdens IF	8	3	1	4	17	18	0.944	7
5	IFK Norrköping	8	0	1	7	7	37	0.189	1

Rules for classification: 1) points; 2) goal ratio.
(C) Champions
