= 1912–13 Svenska Serien =

Swedish Football Event

Svenska Serien
- Season: 1912–13

Svenska Serien 1912–13, part of the 1912–13 Swedish football season, was the third Svenska Serien season played. IFK Göteborg won the league ahead of runners-up Örgryte IS.

== League table ==
Pos	Team	Pld	W	D	L	GF	GA	GR	Pts
1	IFK Göteborg (C)	10	7	2	1	25	9	2.778	16
2	Örgryte IS	10	6	1	3	36	14	2.571	13
3	AIK	10	6	0	4	23	27	0.852	12
4	Djurgårdens IF	10	5	0	5	19	25	0.760	10
5	IFK Uppsala	10	3	1	6	22	23	0.957	7
6	IFK Norrköping	10	0	2	8	7	34	0.206	2

Rules for classification: 1) points; 2) goal ratio.
(C) Champions
