= 1922–23 Svenska Serien =

Svenska Serien
- Season: 1922–23

Svenska Serien 1922–23, part of the 1922–23 Swedish football season, was the ninth Svenska Serien season played. The league was divided into two regional divisions with AIK and GAIS winning the eastern and western divisions. GAIS won the competition after defeating AIK in a final play-off.

== League tables ==
=== Östra ===
Pos	Team	Pld	W	D	L	GF	GA	GR	Pts	Qualification or relegation
1	AIK (A)	10	7	1	2	28	17	1.647	15	Qualification to Championship play-offs
2	IFK Eskilstuna	10	4	2	4	21	17	1.235	10	
3	Hammarby IF	10	4	1	5	16	18	0.889	9	
4	Djurgårdens IF	10	3	3	4	16	19	0.842	9	
5	IK Sleipner	10	4	1	5	14	20	0.700	9	
6	IFK Norrköping (O)	10	4	0	6	15	19	0.789	8	Qualification to Relegation play-offs

Rules for classification: 1) points; 2) goal ratio.
(A) Advance to a further round; (O) Play-off winners

=== Västra ===
Pos	Team	Pld	W	D	L	GF	GA	GR	Pts	Qualification or relegation
1	GAIS (A)	10	5	3	2	15	10	1.500	13	Qualification to Championship play-offs
2	IFK Göteborg	10	5	3	2	18	9	2.000	13	
3	Örgryte IS	10	5	2	3	17	9	1.889	12	
4	Hälsingborgs IF	10	4	4	2	14	9	1.556	12	
5	IFK Malmö	10	3	1	6	8	22	0.364	7	
6	Malmö FF (R)	10	1	2	7	6	19	0.316	4	Qualification to Relegation play-offs

Rules for classification: 1) points; 2) goal ratio.
(A) Advance to a further round; (R) Relegated

=== Championship play-offs ===
June 17, 1923

GAIS	3–1	AIK

?, Gothenburg
July 8, 1923

AIK	0–2	GAIS

?, Stockholm

=== Relegation play-offs ===
May 27, 1923

Västerås IK	1–2	IFK Norrköping

?, Västerås
June 10, 1923

IFK Norrköping	4–1	Västerås IK

?, Norrköping

May 27, 1923

Malmö FF	1–1	Landskrona BoIS

?, Malmö
May 31, 1923

Landskrona BoIS	2–0	Malmö FF

?, Landskrona
