= 1915–16 Svenska Serien =

Svenska Serien
- Season: 1915–16

Svenska Serien 1915–16, part of the 1915–16 Swedish football season, was the sixth Svenska Serien season played. IFK Göteborg won the league ahead of runners-up AIK.

== League table ==
Pos	Team	Pld	W	D	L	GF	GA	GR	Pts	Qualification or relegation
1	IFK Göteborg (C)	10	6	3	1	27	9	3.000	15	
2	AIK	10	7	1	2	33	13	2.538	15	
3	Örgryte IS	10	5	1	4	21	15	1.400	11	
4	GAIS (R)	10	4	0	6	17	24	0.708	8	Relegation to Västsvenska Serien
5	IFK Norrköping	10	3	0	7	12	36	0.333	6	
6	Djurgårdens IF	10	2	1	7	15	28	0.536	5	

Rules for classification: 1) points; 2) goal ratio.
(C) Champions; (R) Relegated
