= 1923–24 Svenska Serien =

Soccer season

Svenska Serien
- Season: 1923–24

Svenska Serien 1923–24, part of the 1923–24 Swedish football season, was the tenth and last Svenska Serien season played, as it was replaced by Allsvenskan. Örgryte IS won the league ahead of runners-up AIK, while Djurgårdens IF were relegated.

== Participating clubs ==
Location of the participating clubs.
Västra serien. Östra serien.

Club	Last season	First season in league	First season of current spell
AIK	Runners-up, 1st (Svenska Serien Östra)	1910	1910
Djurgårdens IF	4th (Svenska Serien Östra)	1911–12	1911–12
IFK Eskilstuna	2nd (Svenska Serien Östra)	1910	1920–21
GAIS	Winners, 1st (Svenska Serien Västra)	1915–16	1920–21
IFK Göteborg	2nd (Svenska Serien Västra)	1910	1910
Hammarby IF	3rd (Svenska Serien Östra)	1920–21	1920–21
Helsingborgs IF	4th (Svenska Serien Västra)	1916–17	1916–17
Landskrona BoIS	No national league play	1923–24	1923–24
IFK Malmö	5th (Svenska Serien Västra)	1920–21	1920–21
IFK Norrköping	6th (Svenska Serien Östra)	1910	1910
IK Sleipner	5th (Svenska Serien Östra)	1922–23	1922–23
Örgryte IS	3rd (Svenska Serien Västra)	1910	1910

== League tables ==
=== Östra ===
Pos	Team	Pld	W	D	L	GF	GA	GR	Pts	Qualification or relegation
1	AIK (A)	10	6	2	2	29	20	1.450	14	Championship Playoffs, 1924–25 Allsvenskan
2	IK Sleipner	10	6	0	4	16	18	0.889	12	1924–25 Allsvenskan
3	IFK Eskilstuna	10	5	0	5	21	25	0.840	10	1924–25 Allsvenskan
4	Hammarby IF	10	3	3	4	16	18	0.889	9	1924–25 Allsvenskan
5	IFK Norrköping	10	3	2	5	14	15	0.933	8	1924–25 Allsvenskan
6	Djurgårdens IF (R)	10	3	1	6	18	18	1.000	7	Relegation to Division 2

Rules for classification: 1) points; 2) goal ratio.
(A) Advance to a further round; (R) Relegated

=== Västra ===
Pos	Team	Pld	W	D	L	GF	GA	GR	Pts	Qualification or relegation
1	Örgryte IS (A)	10	8	1	1	37	11	3.364	17	Championship Playoffs, 1924–25 Allsvenskan
2	GAIS	10	5	2	3	26	17	1.529	12	1924–25 Allsvenskan (Note: Fässberg who won their qualification play-off and which were supposed to replace Landskrona BoIS who finished last in their league, were not allowed promotion to Allsvenskan and it was decided that Landskrona BoIS would be given Fässberg's spot.)
3	Hälsingborgs IF	10	4	2	4	18	15	1.200	10	1924–25 Allsvenskan
4	IFK Göteborg	10	4	2	4	16	17	0.941	10	1924–25 Allsvenskan
5	IFK Malmö	10	4	0	6	6	25	0.240	8	1924–25 Allsvenskan
6	Landskrona BoIS	10	0	3	7	8	26	0.308	3	1924–25 Allsvenskan

Rules for classification: 1) points; 2) goal ratio.
(A) Advance to a further round

== Championship play-offs ==
July 13, 1924

AIK	0–1	Örgryte IS

?, Stockholm
July 20, 1924

Örgryte IS	1–0	AIK

?, Gothenburg

== Results ==
=== Östra ===
Home \ Away	AIK	DIF	IFKE	HIF	IFKN	IKS
AIK		5–4	6–1	3–3	3–1	3–1
Djurgårdens IF	2–0		–	3–0	–	–
IFK Eskilstuna	2–4	–		–	–	–
Hammarby IF	2–2	2–1	–		–	–
IFK Norrköping	0–1	–	–	–		–
IK Sleipner	4–2	–	–	–	–	

Legend: Blue = home team win; Yellow = draw; Red = away team win.

=== Västra ===
Home \ Away	GAI	IFKG	HIF	LBoIS	IFKM	ÖIS
GAIS		4–0	1–5	3–3	4–0	2–1
IFK Göteborg	3–1		0–3	5–0	2–0	1–1
Helsingborgs IF	0–0	0–3		4–0	2–0	1–5
Landskrona BoIS	1–2	1–1	1–1		0–1	1–5
IFK Malmö	0–6	2–1	1–0	2–0		0–4
Örgryte IS	4–3	5–0	4–2	2–1	6–0	

Legend: Blue = home team win; Yellow = draw; Red = away team win.
