= 1916–17 Svenska Serien =

Svenska Serien
- Season: 1916–17

Svenska Serien 1916–17, part of the 1916–17 Swedish football season, was the seventh Svenska Serien season played. IFK Göteborg won the league ahead of runners-up Örgryte IS.

== League table ==
Pos	Team	Pld	W	D	L	GF	GA	GR	Pts
1	IFK Göteborg (C)	10	8	0	2	34	8	4.250	16
2	Örgryte IS	10	6	1	3	27	15	1.800	13
3	AIK	10	4	2	4	17	24	0.708	10
4	Hälsingborgs IF	10	4	1	5	15	19	0.789	9
5	Djurgårdens IF	10	2	2	6	11	20	0.550	6
6	IFK Norrköping	10	2	2	6	15	33	0.455	6

Rules for classification: 1) points; 2) goal ratio.
(C) Champions
