= 1920–21 Svenska Serien =

Svenska Serien
- Season: 1920–21

Svenska Serien 1920–21, part of the 1920–21 Swedish football season, was the eighth Svenska Serien season played and the first since 1917. Örgryte IS won the league ahead of runners-up GAIS.

== League table ==
Pos	Team	Pld	W	D	L	GF	GA	GR	Pts
1	Örgryte IS (C)	18	10	5	3	27	10	2.700	25
2	GAIS	18	10	3	5	47	25	1.880	23
3	Hammarby IF	18	9	4	5	35	27	1.296	22
4	Hälsingborgs IF	18	9	4	5	23	27	0.852	22
5	IFK Göteborg	18	8	4	6	39	21	1.857	20
6	IFK Malmö	18	9	1	8	47	47	1.000	19
7	Djurgårdens IF	18	6	4	8	24	33	0.727	16
8	AIK	18	5	3	10	30	38	0.789	13
9	IFK Eskilstuna	18	4	3	11	23	45	0.511	11
10	IFK Norrköping	18	2	5	11	19	51	0.373	9

Rules for classification: 1) points; 2) goal ratio.
(C) Champions
