= 1913–14 Svenska Serien =

Svenska Serien
- Season: 1913–14

Svenska Serien 1913–14, part of the 1913–14 Swedish football season, was the fourth Svenska Serien season played. IFK Göteborg won the league ahead of runners-up Örgryte IS.

== League table ==
Pos	Team	Pld	W	D	L	GF	GA	GR	Pts	Qualification or relegation
1	IFK Göteborg (C)	10	8	1	1	37	11	3.364	17	
2	Örgryte IS	10	7	1	2	23	9	2.556	15	
3	Djurgårdens IF	10	3	4	3	16	17	0.941	10	
4	AIK	10	4	1	5	17	27	0.630	9	
5	IFK Norrköping	10	2	1	7	19	34	0.559	5	
6	IFK Uppsala (R)	10	1	2	7	14	28	0.500	4	Relegation to Mellansvenska Serien

Rules for classification: 1) points; 2) goal ratio.
(C) Champions; (R) Relegated
