= Stattena IF =

Swedish football club

- Full name: Stattena Idrottsförening
- Founded: 1922
- Ground: Olympiafältet, Helsingborg
- Chairman: Mats Jacobson
- Coach: Bo Svensson; Michael Ekstrand
- League: Division 6 Skåne Västra
- 2020: Division 6 Skåne Västra, 11th
- Website: http://www.stattenaif.se/
Home colours	Away colours

Stattena IF is a Swedish football club located in Helsingborg. The club played two seasons in the Allsvenskan in 1927–28 and 1929–30.

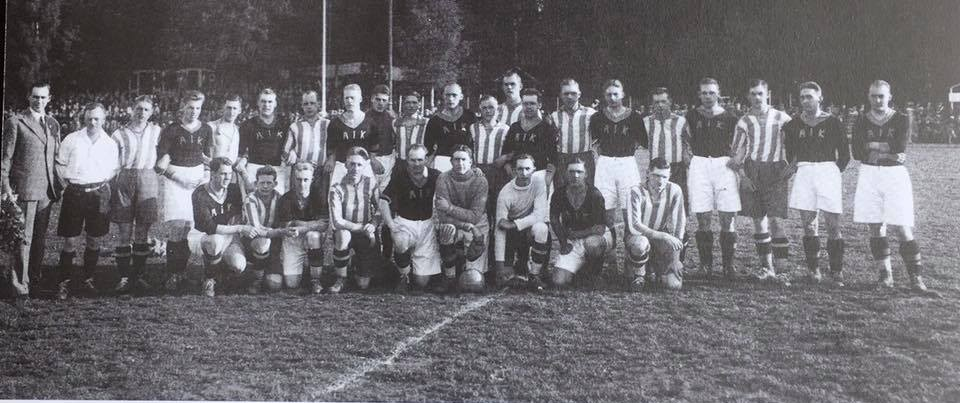
Yellow and blue striped Stattena against AIK 21 September 1927 at Råsunda.

== Background ==
The original club Stattena was one of the two clubs which in 1907 formed Helsingborgs IF. The present club was re-formed on 24 March 1922 and the ladies section was added in 1971.

The club was founded as a local neighborhood team from the Stattena district in Helsingborg. Originally a village, which was located outside the city, which probably contributed to the historical, local patriotic rivalry with Helsingborgs IF.

Since their foundation Stattena IF's men's team has participated in the upper and lower divisions of the Swedish football league system. In their early years the club played in the Allsvenskan for two seasons in 1927–28 and 1929–30. They play their home matches at the Olympiafältet in Helsingborg. The team colours today are blue and white, but historically blue and yellow striped shirts and blue shorts. The kit were later taken over by local competitor Eskilsminne IF. Eskilsminne previously played in a light and dark purple-striped shirt and white shorts.

When Stattena played in the best tier Allsvenskan in the 1920s and 1930s, they had an almost Southern European support group, who watched the training sessions, lively discussed lineups etc. at the beer cafes, and met the team at the train station when they returned to Helsingborg after away matches. Unfortunately, opposing supporters were also hit by a rain of beer bottles, which were thrown at them. When the star player and future national team player Knut Kroon was sold from Stattena to arch-rival Helsingborgs IF, he could barely show up in town.

When Stattena played the Allsvenskan Helsingborg derby against Helsingborgs IF at the Olympia season 1929–30, and Helsingborgs IF got a penalty kick, penalty taker Axel Alfredsson uttered the winged words, which illustrate the rivalry between the teams, despite Helsingborgs IF becoming champions and Stattena got relegated: "I put hatred behind the ball. Stattena has got to lose!"

Five years after their formation, in 1971, the ladies team climbed to the Damallsvenskan. More recently the team has played at the same level in 2003, 2004 and 2009.

Stattena IF are affiliated to the Skånes Fotbollförbund. The club is a member of the Helsingborgs Fotbollsklubbars Allians (Helsingborg Football Club Alliance) and has 900 members with 20 youth teams comprising 11 boys teams and 9 girls teams. The club also cooperates with Filbornaskolan to provide top-level female players with the opportunity to combine football development with a four-year secondary education.

== Season to season ==
=== Men's team ===
In their early history Stattena IF competed in the following divisions:

Season	Level	Division	Section	Position	Movements
1925–26	Tier 2	Division 2	Sydsvenska	2nd	
1926–27	Tier 2	Division 2	Sydsvenska	1st	Promotion Playoffs – Promoted
1927–28	Tier 1	Allsvenskan		12th	Relegated
1928–29	Tier 2	Division 2	Södra	1st	Promoted
1929–30	Tier 1	Allsvenskan		12th	Relegated
1930–31	Tier 2	Division 2	Södra	1st	
1931–32	Tier 2	Division 2	Södra	8th	
1932–33	Tier 2	Division 2	Södra	5th	
1933–34	Tier 2	Division 2	Södra	6th	
1934–35	Tier 2	Division 2	Södra	9th	Relegated
1935–36	Tier 3	Division 3	Sydsvenska	7th	
1936–37	Tier 3	Division 3	Sydsvenska	8th	
1937–38	Tier 3	Division 3	Sydsvenska	7th	
1938–39	Tier 3	Division 3	Sydsvenska	8th	
1939–40	Tier 3	Division 3	Sydsvenska	7th	
1940–41	Tier 3	Division 3	Sydsvenska Södra	10th	Relegated

In recent seasons Stattena IF have competed in the following divisions:

Season	Level	Division	Section	Position	Movements
1999	Tier 8	Division 7	Skåne Nordvästra B	1st	Promoted
2000	Tier 7	Division 6	Skåne Nordvästra B	8th	
2001	Tier 7	Division 6	Skåne Nordvästra A	5th	
2002	Tier 7	Division 6	Skåne Nordvästra B	5th	
2003	Tier 7	Division 6	Skåne Nordvästra A	8th	
2004	Tier 7	Division 6	Skåne Nordvästra B	11th	Relegated
2005	Tier 8	Division 7	Skåne Nordvästra B	2nd	Promotion Playoffs – Promoted
2006*	Tier 8	Division 6	Skåne Nordvästra B	9th	
2007	Tier 8	Division 6	Skåne Nordvästra B	2nd	Promotion Playoffs – Not Promoted
2008	Tier 8	Division 6	Skåne Västra	5th	
2009	Tier 8	Division 6	Skåne Västra	5th	
2010	Tier 8	Division 6	Skåne Nordvästra B	7th	
2011	Tier 8	Division 6	Skåne Nordvästra B	4th	
2012	Tier 8	Division 6	Skåne Nordvästra B	3rd	Promotion Playoffs – Not Promoted
2013	Tier 8	Division 6	Skåne Nordvästra B	3rd	Relegated to Division 7?
Did not compete in 2014
2015	Tier 9	Division 7	Skåne Västra	6th	
2016	Tier 9	Division 7	Skåne Västra	4th	Promotion Playoffs – Not Promoted
2017	Tier 9	Division 7	Skåne Nordvästra	2nd	Promoted
2018	Tier 8	Division 6	Skåne Västra	7th	
2019	Tier 8	Division 6	Skåne Västra	3rd	Promotion Playoffs - Not Promoted
2020	Tier 8	Division 6	Skåne Västra	11th	

* League restructuring in 2006 resulted in a new division being created at Tier 3 and subsequent divisions dropping a level.

=== Ladies Team ===
Season	Level	Division	Section	Position	Movements
1999	Tier 3	Division 2	Södra Götaland	1st	Promoted
2000	Tier 2	Division 1	Södra	5th	
2001	Tier 2	Division 1	Södra	4th	
2002	Tier 2	Division 1	Söderettan	2nd	Promoted
2003	Tier 1	Damallsvenskan		10th	
2004	Tier 1	Damallsvenskan		12th	Relegated
2005	Tier 2	Division 1	Söderettan	5th	
2006	Tier 2	Division 1	Söderettan	5th	
2007	Tier 2	Division 1	Söderettan	4th	
2008	Tier 2	Division 1	Söderettan	1st	Promoted
2009	Tier 1	Damallsvenskan		12th	Relegated
2010	Tier 2	Division 1	Söderettan	10th	Relegated

== Notable players ==
- (Sweden) Anders Linderoth
- (Sweden) Knut Kroon
- (Sweden) Pia Sundhage
- (Sweden) Caroline Seger
- (Sweden) Zećira Mušović
- (Iceland) Erla Steina Arnardóttir
- (United States) Nancy Augustyniak Goffi
