= 1927–28 Allsvenskan =

4th season of Allsvenskan

Allsvenskan
- Season: 1927–28
- Champions: Örgryte IS
- Relegated: Djurgårdens IF; Stattena IF
- Top goalscorer: Carl-Erik Holmberg, Hälsingborgs IF (27)
- Average attendance: 4,767

Allsvenskan 1927–28, part of the 1927–28 Swedish football season, was the fourth Allsvenskan season played. The first match was played 31 July 1927 and the last match was played 3 June 1928. Örgryte IS won the league ahead of runners-up Hälsingborgs IF, while Djurgårdens IF and Stattena IF were relegated.

== Participating clubs ==
Location of the participating clubs

Club	Last season	First season in league	First season of current spell
AIK	5th	1924–25	1924–25
Djurgårdens IF	1st (Div. 2 Östsvenska Serien)	1927–28	1927–28
IF Elfsborg	10th	1926–27	1926–27
IFK Eskilstuna	7th	1924–25	1924–25
GAIS	1st	1924–25	1924–25
IFK Göteborg	2nd	1924–25	1924–25
Hälsingborgs IF	3rd	1924–25	1924–25
Landskrona BoIS	9th	1924–25	1924–25
IFK Norrköping	8th	1924–25	1924–25
IK Sleipner	6th	1924–25	1924–25
Stattena IF	1st (Div. 2 Sydsvenska Serien)	1927–28	1927–28
Örgryte IS	4th	1924–25	1924–25

== League table ==
Pos	Team	Pld	W	D	L	GF	GA	GD	Pts	Qualification or relegation
1	Örgryte IS (C)	22	14	5	3	69	29	+40	33	
2	Hälsingborgs IF	22	14	5	3	64	27	+37	33	
3	GAIS	22	11	6	5	45	29	+16	28	
4	IFK Göteborg	22	10	6	6	39	33	+6	26	
5	IF Elfsborg	22	10	3	9	48	35	+13	23	
6	IK Sleipner	22	8	5	9	50	44	+6	21	
7	AIK	22	8	4	10	49	47	+2	20	
8	IFK Norrköping	22	6	7	9	36	63	−27	19	
9	Landskrona BoIS	22	8	2	12	49	52	−3	18	
10	IFK Eskilstuna	22	7	4	11	42	65	−23	18	
11	Djurgårdens IF (R)	22	4	6	12	43	66	−23	14	Relegation to Division 2
12	Stattena (R)	22	5	1	16	30	74	−44	11	Relegation to Division 2

Rules for classification: 1) points; 2) goal difference; 3) number of goals scored.
(C) Champions; (R) Relegated

== Results ==
Home \ Away	AIK	DIF	IFE	IFKE	GAIS	IFKG	HIF	LBoIS	IFKN	IKS	SIF	ÖIS
AIK		2–1	2–0	8–4	0–1	2–2	1–2	4–2	2–3	2–0	5–1	1–3
Djurgårdens IF	3–3		2–2	4–1	1–2	1–4	1–9	7–0	3–3	2–2	3–2	2–2
IF Elfsborg	2–1	3–1		1–1	3–1	1–0	0–2	6–1	4–1	4–1	4–1	2–5
IFK Eskilstuna	3–1	4–1	2–1		2–2	2–1	1–2	2–1	4–1	1–1	0–1	1–1
GAIS	3–3	1–2	2–0	6–0		1–2	1–2	5–0	1–0	2–1	2–1	2–2
IFK Göteborg	1–1	3–0	1–0	4–2	1–2		1–1	2–1	0–2	2–1	4–1	3–2
Hälsingborgs IF	1–2	5–2	2–0	4–2	2–2	1–1		3–1	5–0	1–3	7–0	6–1
Landskrona BoIS	3–1	4–1	2–1	11–0	0–2	6–1	2–3		3–1	1–1	5–0	2–4
IFK Norrköping	2–0	3–3	2–2	4–2	2–2	2–2	2–2	1–1		0–5	3–1	0–3
IK Sleipner	3–1	4–1	2–3	4–1	2–3	2–1	0–0	1–3	7–2		6–4	3–3
Stattena IF	3–6	3–1	1–9	2–6	2–2	0–1	2–3	2–0	0–2	2–1		0–4
Örgryte IS	4–1	4–1	2–0	4–1	1–0	2–2	2–1	4–0	11–0	5–0	0–1	

Legend: Blue = home team win; Yellow = draw; Red = away team win.

== Attendances ==
	Club	Home average	Away average	Home high
1	Örgryte IS	8,218	5,516	22,082
2	AIK	7,232	4,772	10,093
3	Djurgårdens IF	6,755	4,331	12,202
4	GAIS	6,714	4,752	16,748
5	IFK Göteborg	6,475	4,694	14,578
6	Hälsingborgs IF	4,582	9,043	6,885
7	IF Elfsborg	3,739	4,083	5,222
8	Stattena IF	3,193	3,922	4,885
9	IK Sleipner	3,093	4,420	3,913
10	IFK Eskilstuna	2,529	3,973	4,356
11	IFK Norrköping	2,510	3,383	4,509
12	Landskrona BoIS	2,259	4,410	6,805
—	Total	4,775	—	22,082

== Top scorers ==
	Player	Nat	Club	Goals
1	Carl-Erik Holmberg	(Sweden)	Örgryte IS	27
2	Harry Lundahl	(Sweden)	Hälsingborgs IF	24
3	Sven Rydell	(Sweden)	Örgryte IS	21
4	Harry Dahl	(Sweden)	Landskrona BoIS	20
4	Sven Jonasson	(Sweden)	IF Elfsborg	20
