= Svenska Serien =

Football league in Sweden

Svenska Serien (literally, "The Swedish Series", also Svenska Fotbollserien, "The Swedish Football Series") was the highest league in Swedish football and was played since 1910–1917, 1920–1921, and 1922–1924. It was then replaced by the current-day league Allsvenskan. Despite being the highest league, the winner of Svenska Serien did not become Swedish Champions; instead that title was awarded to the winner of the cup tournament Svenska Mästerskapet between 1896 and 1925.

== Champions ==
Season	Winners	Runners-up
1910	Örgryte IS (1)	AIK
1911–12	Örgryte IS (2)	Djurgårdens IF
1912–13	IFK Göteborg (1)	Örgryte IS
1913–14	IFK Göteborg (2)	Örgryte IS
1914–15	IFK Göteborg (3)	AIK
1915–16	IFK Göteborg (4)	AIK
1916–17	IFK Göteborg (5)	Örgryte IS
1917–18	No competition	
1918–19	No competition	
1919–20	No competition	
1920–21	Örgryte IS (3)	GAIS
1921–22	No competition	
1922–23	GAIS (1)	AIK
1923–24	Örgryte IS (4)	AIK

== League champions ==
Titles	Club
5	IFK Göteborg
4	Örgryte IS
1	GAIS

== See also ==
- All-time Svenska Serien table
