= Örgryte IS =

Swedish football club

Örgryte
- Full name: Örgryte Idrottsällskap
- Nickname: Sällskapet (lit. 'The Society')
- Short name: ÖIS
- Founded: December 4, 1887; 138 years ago
- Ground: Gamla Ullevi, Gothenburg
- Capacity: 18,416
- Chairman: Terje Johansson
- Head coach: Andreas Holmberg
- League: Allsvenskan
- 2025: Superettan, 3rd of 16 (promoted via play-offs)
- Website: fotboll.ois.se
| Home colours | Away colours |

Örgryte Idrottssällskap, commonly referred to as Örgryte IS, Örgryte (Swedish: [ˈœ̂ːrˌɡryːtɛ]) or (especially locally) ÖIS or Öis, (Note: In the media, the name of the club is normally abbreviated "Öis", in accordance with Swedish writing standards that state that acronyms that are pronounced as a word, as opposed to letter by letter, should be spelled with the first letter in upper case and the remaining in lower case, thus "Öis". However, some fans of the club, as well as the club itself, prefer to use only uppercase, "ÖIS", even though they also pronounce it as a word: [ˈœjs].) is a Swedish sports club based in Gothenburg. It consists of four departments, namely bowling, football, athletics and wrestling. However, the club is best known for its football department. The club was founded in 1887 which makes it the oldest active sports club in the country.

== History ==
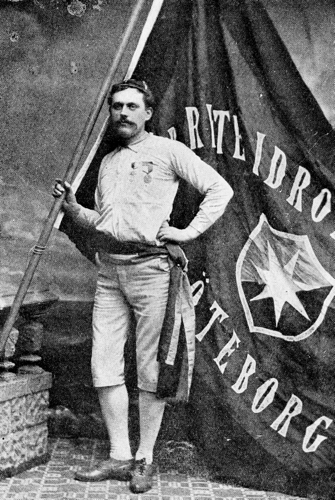
Wilhelm Friberg holding the Örgryte flag in the 1890s.

The club was founded on 4 December 1887 by Willhem Friberg and participated in the first football match in Sweden on 22 May 1892; football had been brought to the club by lacemakers from the Newmilns club in Ayrshire in 1891. Today, a memorial on Heden in central Gothenburg reminiscent of this match. Another memorial has been erected inside the amusement park Liseberg. Örgryte IS came to dominate the childhood of Swedish football. In 1904 Örgyte IS met a friendly match between the English Corinthian FC, thanks for the hospitality donated a silver cup – Corinthian Bowl that next year became the prize in a contest between Sweden's best teams.

In 1908 Örgyte IS officially opened its facility Walhalla stadium. Hugo Levin, football player and the secretary of Örgyte IS, was one of many involved in the building of Walhalla and had several positions in Gothenburg football. Walhalla was inaugurated by a match between Örgryte and German champions Viktoria Berlin. Between 1910 and 1924 Örgryte IS played in the Swedish series, a series that lacked national status despite participation by leading teams. Öis won the series in 1910, 1912 and 1924 the team won the 1924 Western series, and then the final against AIK. Player Sven Rydell who became Sweden's first major football star and became known for his fast play and creative dribbling, but above all for his ability to score. Carl-Erik Holmberg was a contributor to its success, with its total of 193 goals in the Swedish League for Örgryte IS. 1926 the team celebrated a major success when beating Aston Villa 5–2, which was unusual.

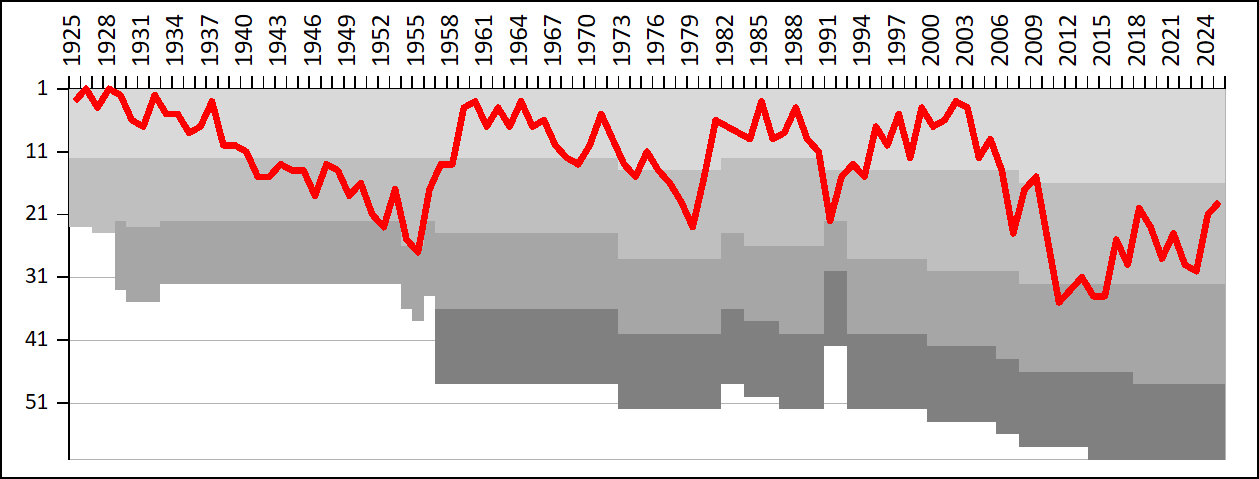
A chart showing the progress of Örgryte IS through the swedish football league system. The different shades of gray represent league divisions.

In the first decades of the 20th century, Örgryte IS also played bandy. The club became Gothenburg district champions in this sport in 1917.

In the late 1930s the fortunes began to decline for the team. They finished 10th out of 12 teams in both 1938 and 1939, and avoided relegation. In 1940 Örgyte IS relegated from allsvenskan to Division II Västra. During the 1940s and 1950s the team played in Division 2 but would enjoy greater success in the 1950s. Örgryte attracted record crowds despite the low status in the second division. The team recruited Gunnar Gren and in 1956 he becomes the player-coach for the offensive teams that attracted large crowds to ÖIS matches. In 1958 the team was becoming more competitive. A young player at the time was Agne Simonsson who would later play in the Sweden national team.

Örgryte IS has won 12 national championship titles and one national cup title. After having economic problems Örgryte Fotboll AB went into bankruptcy in February 2011. The upshot of the bankruptcy was that Örgryte was relegated to the third Swedish division, Division 1 Södra. Their home arena is Gamla Ullevi. The club is affiliated to the Göteborgs Fotbollförbund.

In 2007 after 120 years of solely male membership, the youth faction of the football section would accept girls.

Örgryte IS played for a long time in red shirts and blue shorts, but in 2018 they went back to using their older claret shirts.

== Supporters ==
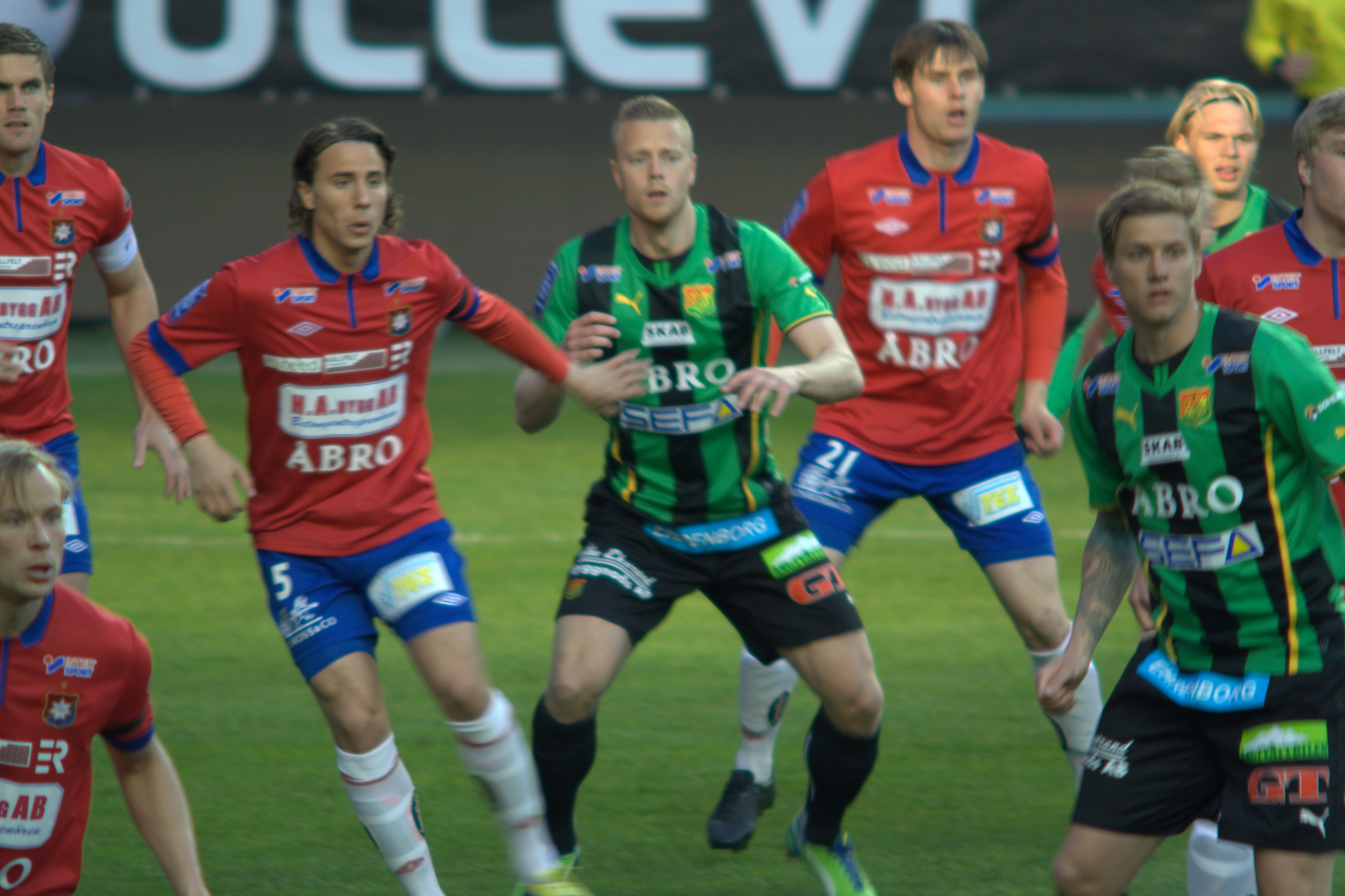
Örgryte playing a Gothenburg derby against GAIS in the 2013 Superettan.

The name of the official supporter club is ÖIS Supporterklubb Balders Hage. There are also other groups of fans. The second largest supporter group is the Ultras-influenced Inferno Örgryte.

According to a recent survey, Örgryte IS is the fourth most popular team in Gothenburg, with 9% of the football fans supporting them. The other local teams with a notable following are IFK Göteborg, GAIS and BK Häcken.

Notable fans of the club include Marcus and Peter Birro, Weiron Holmberg, Fredrik Ohlsson, Björn Afzelius and Leif Pagrotsky.

=== Rivalries ===
The strongest rivalry is with IFK Göteborg, also from Gothenburg. The derbies between the two teams have attracted some of the highest attendance in Swedish football. The fixture attracted 52,194 spectators in 1959, an all time Allsvenskan record. The other big rivalry is with GAIS.

== Players ==
=== First-team squad ===
As of 3 September 2026

Note: Flags indicate national team as defined under FIFA eligibility rules; some limited exceptions apply. Players may hold more than one non-FIFA nationality.

| No. | Pos. | Nation | Player |
|---|---|---|---|
| 2 | DF | ENG | Michael Parker |
| 3 | DF | SWE | Jonathan Azulay |
| 5 | DF | SWE | Christoffer Styffe |
| 6 | DF | GUI | Mikael Dyrestam |
| 7 | MF | SWE | Charlie Vindehall |
| 8 | MF | CAN | Benjamin Laturnus |
| 9 | FW | SWE | Liam Filip Andersson |
| 10 | FW | SWE | Rasmus Alm |
| 11 | FW | ENG | David Obou |
| 14 | FW | SWE | Daniel Paulson (captain) |
| 15 | FW | NGR | Jerome Tibbling Ugwo |
| 16 | DF | SWE | Hampus Dahlqvist |
| 17 | FW | SWE | William Hofvander |
| 18 | DF | SWE | Adam Andersson |

| No. | Pos. | Nation | Player |
|---|---|---|---|
| 19 | MF | SWE | Anton Andreasson |
| 21 | MF | SWE | William Kenndal |
| 22 | FW | SWE | Tobias Sana |
| 23 | MF | NZL | Owen Parker-Price |
| 24 | DF | SWE | William Svensson |
| 25 | DF | SWE | Johan Hammar |
| 29 | FW | SWE | Marlon Ebietomere |
| 30 | GK | SWE | Mathias Nilsson |
| 31 | MF | SOM | Aydarus Abukar |
| 32 | FW | SWE | Viktor Ekblom (on loan from Tromsø) |
| 33 | DF | SWE | Sebastian Lagerlund |
| 34 | GK | SWE | Alex Rahm |
| 44 | GK | SWE | Hampus Gustafsson |

=== Out on loan ===
Note: Flags indicate national team as defined under FIFA eligibility rules; some limited exceptions apply. Players may hold more than one non-FIFA nationality.

| No. | Pos. | Nation | Player |
|---|---|---|---|
| — | DF | SWE | Philip Bergqvist (at Jonsereds IF until 30 November 2026) |
| — | DF | SWE | Carl Millard Javette (at Jonsereds IF until 30 November 2026) |
| — | FW | SWE | Månz Karlsson (at Torslanda until 30 November 2026) |

=== Retired numbers ===
4 – Niclas Sjöstedt, defender (1987–2000)

== Honours ==
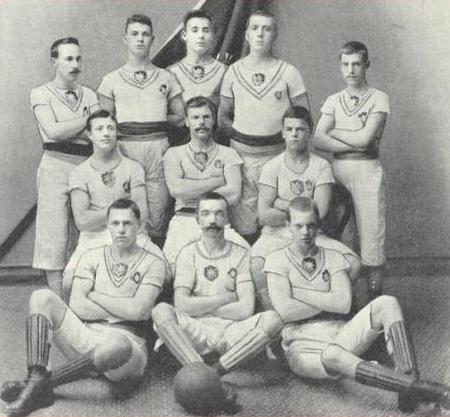
Örgryte IS team of year 1896, that won the first Swedish championship final.

- Swedish Champions (Note: The title of "Swedish Champions" has been awarded to the winner of four different competitions over the years. Between 1896 and 1925 the title was awarded to the winner of Svenska Mästerskapet, a stand-alone cup tournament. No club were given the title between 1926 and 1930 even though the first-tier league Allsvenskan was played. In 1931 the title was reinstated and awarded to the winner of Allsvenskan. Between 1982 and 1990 a play-off in cup format was held at the end of the league season to decide the champions. After the play-off format in 1991 and 1992 the title was decided by the winner of Mästerskapsserien, an additional league after the end of Allsvenskan. Since the 1993 season the title has once again been awarded to the winner of Allsvenskan.)
  - Winners (12): 1896, 1897, 1898, 1899, 1902, 1904, 1905, 1906, 1907, 1909, 1913, 1985

=== League ===
- Allsvenskan:
  - Winners (2): 1925–26, 1927–28
  - Play-off winners (1): 1985
  - Runners-up (2): 1928–29, 1931–32
- Svenska Serien:
  - Winners (4): 1910, 1911–12, 1920–21, 1923–24
  - Runners-up (3): 1912–13, 1913–14, 1916–17
- Superettan:
  - Winners (1): 2008
- Division 1 Södra:
  - Winners (2): 1994, 2012
  - Runners-up (2): 2014, 2015
- Division 1 Västra:
  - Runners-up (1): 1991
- Fyrkantserien:
  - Runners-up (2): 1918, 1919

=== Cups ===
- Svenska Cupen:
  - Winners (1): 1999–2000
  - Runners-up (1): 1997–98
- Svenska Mästerskapet:
  - Winners (11): 1896, 1897, 1898, 1899, 1902, 1904, 1905, 1906, 1907, 1909, 1913
  - Runners-up (5): 1897 (reserve team), 1900, 1901 (reserve team), 1912, 1915
- Corinthian Bowl:
  - Winners (7): 1906, 1907, 1908, 1909, 1911, 1912, 1913
  - Runners-up (1): 1910
- Svenska Fotbollspokalen:
  - Winners (2): 1903 I, 1903 II

== See also ==
- List of Örgryte IS players
