= 1919 in Swedish football =

The 1919 season in Swedish football, starting January 1919 and ending December 1919:

== Honours ==
=== Official titles ===
Title	Team	Reason
1919 Swedish Champions	GAIS	Winners of Svenska Mästerskapet

=== Competitions ===
Level	Competition	Team
1st level	Fyrkantserien 1919	IFK Göteborg
Championship Cup	Svenska Mästerskapet 1919	GAIS
Cup competition	Kamratmästerskapen 1919	IFK Hässleholm

== Promotions, relegations and qualifications ==
=== Promotions ===
Promoted from	Promoted to	Team	Reason
Unknown	Division 1 Svenska Serien 1920–21	AIK	Unknown
Unknown	Division 1 Svenska Serien 1920–21	Djurgårdens IF	Unknown
Unknown	Division 1 Svenska Serien 1920–21	IFK Eskilstuna	Unknown
Unknown	Division 1 Svenska Serien 1920–21	GAIS	Unknown
Unknown	Division 1 Svenska Serien 1920–21	IFK Göteborg	Unknown
Unknown	Division 1 Svenska Serien 1920–21	Hammarby IF	Unknown
Unknown	Division 1 Svenska Serien 1920–21	Helsingborgs IF	Unknown
Unknown	Division 1 Svenska Serien 1920–21	IFK Malmö	Unknown
Unknown	Division 1 Svenska Serien 1920–21	IFK Norrköping	Unknown
Unknown	Division 1 Svenska Serien 1920–21	Örgryte IS	Unknown
Unknown	Division 2 Uppsvenska Serien 1920–21	Järva IS	Unknown
Unknown	Division 2 Uppsvenska Serien 1920–21	IF Linnéa	Unknown
Unknown	Division 2 Uppsvenska Serien 1920–21	IK Sirius	Unknown
Unknown	Division 2 Uppsvenska Serien 1920–21	Stockholms BK	Unknown
Unknown	Division 2 Uppsvenska Serien 1920–21	Uppsala IF	Unknown
Unknown	Division 2 Uppsvenska Serien 1920–21	IF Vesta	Unknown
Unknown	Division 2 Uppsvenska Serien 1920–21	Westermalms IF	Unknown
Unknown	Division 2 Mellansvenska Serien 1920–21	IFK Arboga	Unknown
Unknown	Division 2 Mellansvenska Serien 1920–21	IK City	Unknown
Unknown	Division 2 Mellansvenska Serien 1920–21	Köpings IS	Unknown
Unknown	Division 2 Mellansvenska Serien 1920–21	Mariebergs IK	Unknown
Unknown	Division 2 Mellansvenska Serien 1920–21	IK Sleipner	Unknown
Unknown	Division 2 Mellansvenska Serien 1920–21	IFK Stockholm	Unknown
Unknown	Division 2 Mellansvenska Serien 1920–21	IFK Västerås	Unknown
Unknown	Division 2 Mellansvenska Serien 1920–21	Örebro SK	Unknown
Unknown	Division 2 Västsvenska Serien 1920–21	IF Elfsborg	Unknown
Unknown	Division 2 Västsvenska Serien 1920–21	Fässbergs IF	Unknown
Unknown	Division 2 Västsvenska Serien 1920–21	IF Heimer	Unknown
Unknown	Division 2 Västsvenska Serien 1920–21	Skara IF	Unknown
Unknown	Division 2 Västsvenska Serien 1920–21	IFK Skövde	Unknown
Unknown	Division 2 Västsvenska Serien 1920–21	IFK Uddevalla	Unknown
Unknown	Division 2 Västsvenska Serien 1920–21	IK Virgo	Unknown
Unknown	Division 2 Västsvenska Serien 1920–21	Vänersborgs IF	Unknown
Unknown	Division 2 Sydsvenska Serien 1920–21	IS Halmia	Unknown
Unknown	Division 2 Sydsvenska Serien 1920–21	IFK Helsingborg	Unknown
Unknown	Division 2 Sydsvenska Serien 1920–21	Husqvarna IF	Unknown
Unknown	Division 2 Sydsvenska Serien 1920–21	Jönköpings IS	Unknown
Unknown	Division 2 Sydsvenska Serien 1920–21	Landskrona BoIS	Unknown
Unknown	Division 2 Sydsvenska Serien 1920–21	Malmö FF	Unknown

=== Relegations ===
Relegated from	Relegated to	Team	Reason
Fyrkantserien 1919	Unknown	AIK	No Fyrkantserien next season
Fyrkantserien 1919	Unknown	Djurgårdens IF	No Fyrkantserien next season
Fyrkantserien 1919	Unknown	IFK Göteborg	No Fyrkantserien next season
Fyrkantserien 1919	Unknown	Örgryte IS	No Fyrkantserien next season

== Domestic results ==
=== Fyrkantserien 1919 ===
1919 clubs

Pos	Team	Pld	W	D	L	GF	GA	GR	Pts	IFKG	ÖIS	AIK	DIF
1	IFK Göteborg	5	3	0	2	8	6	1.333	6	—	2–1	4–1	(Note: The league was abandoned because of the Spanish flu pandemic, however the incomplete table is considered the final table. The following three matches were not played: AIK–Örgryte IS, Örgryte IS–AIK and IFK Göteborg–Djurgårdens IF.)
2	Örgryte IS	4	2	0	2	10	6	1.667	4	0–2	—	(Note: The league was abandoned because of the Spanish flu pandemic, however the incomplete table is considered the final table. The following three matches were not played: AIK–Örgryte IS, Örgryte IS–AIK and IFK Göteborg–Djurgårdens IF.)	?
3	AIK	4	1	2	1	6	8	0.750	4	1–0	(Note: The league was abandoned because of the Spanish flu pandemic, however the incomplete table is considered the final table. The following three matches were not played: AIK–Örgryte IS, Örgryte IS–AIK and IFK Göteborg–Djurgårdens IF.)	—	1–1
4	Djurgårdens IF	5	1	2	2	9	13	0.692	4	3–0	?	3–3	—

Rules for classification: 1) points; 2) goal ratio

=== Svenska Mästerskapet 1919 ===
Final

October 19, 1919

GAIS	4–1	Djurgårdens IF

Stockholms Stadion, Stockholm

=== Kamratmästerskapen 1919 ===
Final

June 6, 1920

IFK Hässleholm	w.o.	IFK Stockholm

Hässleholms IP, Hässleholm

== National team results ==
May 29, 1919
Friendly
№ 48

Sweden	1–0	Finland
Svedberg 71' (p)

Stockholms Stadion, Stockholm
Attendance: 8,000
Referee: Vestergaard (Denmark)

Sweden: Frithiof Rudén - Ragnar Wicksell, Einar Hemming - Gustaf Carlson, Bruno Lindström, Thore Sundberg - Rune Bergström, Rudolf Kock, Helmer Svedberg, Sten Söderberg, Carl Karlstrand.

June 5, 1919
Friendly
№ 49

Denmark	3–0	Sweden
Nielsen 8', 60'; Thorsteinsson 34'

Idrætsparken, Copenhagen
Attendance: 22,000
Referee: Mutters (Netherlands)

Sweden: Robert Zander - Albert Andersson, Valdus Lund - Gustaf Carlson, Sven Friberg, Ivar Klingström - Erik Eiserman, Herbert Karlsson, Erik Börjesson, Erik Hjelm, Mauritz Sandberg.

June 9, 1919
Friendly
№ 50

Netherlands	3–1	Sweden
Brokmann 82'; Kessler 84'; Gupffert 89'		Karlsson 22'

Oude Stadion, Amsterdam
Attendance: 32,000
Referee: Howcroft (England)

Sweden: Sven Rylander - Albert Andersson, Erik Lillienberg - Carl Ohlsson, Sven Friberg, Ivar Klingström - Erik Eiserman, Sjunne Hallberg, Herbert Karlsson, Erik Hjelm, Mauritz Sandberg.

June 29, 1919
Friendly
№ 51

Norway	4–3	Sweden
Engebretsen 2', 80'; Gundersen 6'; Wold 47'		Karlsson 25'; Aulie 58' (og); Bergström 63'

Gressbanen, Kristiania
Attendance: 14,000
Referee: Vestergaard (Denmark)

Sweden: Frithiof Rudén - Theodor Malm, Ragnar Wicksell - Oskar Berndtsson, Bruno Lindström, Einar Hemming - Rune Bergström, Herbert Karlsson, Karl Gustafsson, Helge Ekroth, Thore Sundberg.

August 24, 1919
Friendly
№ 52

Sweden	4–1	Netherlands
Karlsson 6', 20', 43'; Svedberg 7'		Buitenweg 24'

Stockholms Stadion, Stockholm
Attendance: 20,000
Referee: Vestergaard (Denmark)

Sweden: Robert Zander - Albert Andersson, Henning Svensson - Gustaf Carlson, Ragnar Wicksell, Axel Corall - Rune Bergström, Herbert Karlsson, Helmer Svedberg, Erik Hjelm, Mauritz Sandberg.

September 14, 1919
Friendly
№ 53

Sweden	1–5	Norway
Svedberg 8'		Engebretsen 20', 21', 32'; Wold 54'; Gundersen 80'

Ullevi, Gothenburg
Attendance: 12,000
Referee: Vestergaard (Denmark)

Sweden: Robert Zander - Albert Andersson, Henning Svensson - Gustaf Carlson, Ragnar Wicksell, Axel Corall - Rune Bergström, Herbert Karlsson, Helmer Svedberg, Erik Hjelm, Mauritz Sandberg.

September 28, 1919
Friendly
№ 54

Finland	3–3	Sweden
Wickström 22', 37'; Thorn 75'		Kock 78', 88'; Arontzon 83'

Tölö bollplan, Helsinki
Attendance: 5,000
Referee: Vestergaard (Denmark)

Sweden: Erik Hillerström - Theodor Malm, Gösta Wihlborg - Bruno Lindström, Emanuel Samuelsson, Axel Corall - Rune Bergström, Rudolf Kock, David Jonason, Albin Dahl (87' Ivar Carleson), Bror Arontzon.

October 12, 1919
Friendly
№ 55

Sweden	3–0	Denmark
Karlsson 2', 35', 88'

Stockholms Stadion, Stockholm
Attendance: 18,663
Referee: Howcroft (England)

Sweden: Robert Zander - Valdus Lund, Henning Svensson - Carl Ohlsson, Konrad Törnqvist, Nils Karlsson - Rune Wenzel, Albert Olsson, Herbert Karlsson, Joel Björkman, Mauritz Sandberg.

== National team players in season 1919 ==
name	pos.	caps	goals	club
Albert "Banjo" Andersson	DF	4	0	Örgryte IS
Bror Arontzon	FW	1	1	IF Elfsborg
Rune Bergström	FW	5	1	AIK
Oskar Berndtsson	MF	1	0	AIK
Joel "Jylle" Björkman	FW	1	0	GAIS
Erik "Börje" Börjesson	FW	1	0	IFK Göteborg
Ivar "Iffa" Carleson (Carlesson)	FW	1	0	AIK
Gustaf "Gurra" Carlson	MF	4	0	Mariebergs IK
Axel Corall	MF	3	0	Hammarby IF
Albin Dahl	FW	1	0	Landskrona BoIS
Erik Eiserman	FW	2	0	IFK Göteborg
Helge "Ekis" Ekroth	FW	1	0	AIK
Sven Friberg	MF	2	0	Örgryte IS
Karl "Köping" Gustafsson	FW	1	0	Djurgårdens IF
Sjunne Hallberg	FW	1	0	Örgryte IS
Einar "Hacko" Hemming	DF/MF	2	0	Djurgårdens IF
Erik "Hiller" Hillerström	GK	1	0	AIK
Erik Hjelm	FW	4	0	IFK Göteborg
David "Mr. Jones" Jonason (Jonasson)	FW	1	0	Mariebergs IK
Herbert "Murren" Karlsson	FW	6	8	IFK Göteborg
Nils Karlsson	MF	1	0	GAIS
Carl Karlstrand	FW	1	0	Djurgårdens IF
Ivar "Klinga" Klingström	MF	2	0	Örgryte IS
Rudolf "Putte" Kock	FW	2	2	AIK
Erik "Flintis" Lillienberg	DF	1	0	Örgryte IS
Bruno Lindström	MF	3	0	AIK
Valdus "Gobben" Lund	DF	2	0	IFK Göteborg
Theodor "Todde" Malm	DF	2	0	AIK
Carl "Kalle Kill" Ohlsson	MF	2	0	IFK Göteborg
Albert "Abben" Olsson	FW	1	0	GAIS
Frithiof "Fritte" Rudén	GK	2	0	Djurgårdens IF
Sven Rylander	GK	1	0	IFK Göteborg
Emanuel "Manne" Samuelsson	MF	1	0	IFK Norrköping
Mauritz "Moje" Sandberg	FW	5	0	IFK Göteborg
Sten "Knata" Söderberg	FW	1	0	Djurgårdens IF
Thore Sundberg	MF/FW	2	0	AIK
Helmer "Pysen" Svedberg	FW	3	3	AIK
Henning Svensson	DF	3	0	IFK Göteborg
Konrad Törnqvist	MF	1	0	IFK Göteborg
Rune Wenzel	FW	1	0	GAIS
Ragnar "Ragge" Wicksell	DF/MF	4	0	Djurgårdens IF
Gösta "Pysen" Wihlborg	DF	1	0	Hammarby IF
Robert Zander	GK	4	0	Örgryte IS
