= 1916–17 in Swedish football =

The 1916-17 season in Swedish football, starting August 1916 and ending December 1917:

== Honours ==
=== Official titles ===
Title	Team	Reason
1916 Swedish Champions	AIK	Winners of Svenska Mästerskapet
1917 Swedish Champions	Djurgårdens IF	Winners of Svenska Mästerskapet

=== Competitions ===
Level	Competition	Team
1st level	Svenska Serien 1916–17	IFK Göteborg
2nd level	Uppsvenska Serien 1916–17	Hammarby IF
2nd level	Mellansvenska Serien 1916–17	IFK Eskilstuna
2nd level	Östsvenska Serien 1916–17	IK City
2nd level	Västsvenska Serien 1916–17	GAIS
Championship Cup	Svenska Mästerskapet 1916	AIK
Championship Cup	Svenska Mästerskapet 1917	Djurgårdens IF
Cup competition	Kamratmästerskapen 1916	IFK Malmö
Cup competition	Kamratmästerskapen 1917	IFK Eskilstuna
Cup competition	Wicanderska Välgörenhetsskölden 1916	AIK

== Promotions, relegations and qualifications ==
=== Promotions ===
Promoted from	Promoted to	Team	Reason
Unknown	Fyrkantserien 1918	AIK	Unknown
Unknown	Fyrkantserien 1918	Djurgårdens IF	Unknown
Unknown	Fyrkantserien 1918	IFK Göteborg	Unknown
Unknown	Fyrkantserien 1918	Örgryte IS	Unknown

=== Relegations ===
Relegated from	Relegated to	Team	Reason
Svenska Serien 1916–17	Unknown	AIK	No Svenska Serien next season
Svenska Serien 1916–17	Unknown	Djurgårdens IF	No Svenska Serien next season
Svenska Serien 1916–17	Unknown	IFK Göteborg	No Svenska Serien next season
Svenska Serien 1916–17	Unknown	Helsingborgs IF	No Svenska Serien next season
Svenska Serien 1916–17	Unknown	IFK Norrköping	No Svenska Serien next season
Svenska Serien 1916–17	Unknown	Örgryte IS	No Svenska Serien next season
Uppsvenska Serien 1916–17	Unknown	Gefle IF	No Uppsvenska Serien next season
Uppsvenska Serien 1916–17	Unknown	IFK Gävle	No Uppsvenska Serien next season
Uppsvenska Serien 1916–17	Unknown	Hammarby IF	No Uppsvenska Serien next season
Uppsvenska Serien 1916–17	Unknown	Johanneshofs IF	No Uppsvenska Serien next season
Uppsvenska Serien 1916–17	Unknown	Sandvikens AIK	No Uppsvenska Serien next season
Uppsvenska Serien 1916–17	Unknown	IK Sirius	No Uppsvenska Serien next season
Mellansvenska Serien 1916–17	Unknown	IFK Eskilstuna	No Mellansvenska Serien next season
Mellansvenska Serien 1916–17	Unknown	Köpings IS	No Mellansvenska Serien next season
Mellansvenska Serien 1916–17	Unknown	Mariebergs IK	No Mellansvenska Serien next season
Mellansvenska Serien 1916–17	Unknown	IK Sleipner	No Mellansvenska Serien next season
Mellansvenska Serien 1916–17	Unknown	IFK Stockholm	No Mellansvenska Serien next season
Mellansvenska Serien 1916–17	Unknown	IFK Uppsala	No Mellansvenska Serien next season
Mellansvenska Serien 1916–17	Unknown	IFK Västerås	No Mellansvenska Serien next season
Mellansvenska Serien 1916–17	Unknown	Westermalms IF	No Mellansvenska Serien next season
Östsvenska Serien 1916–17	Unknown	IK City	No Östsvenska Serien next season
Östsvenska Serien 1916–17	Unknown	Enköpings AIF	No Östsvenska Serien next season
Östsvenska Serien 1916–17	Unknown	IF Swithiod	No Östsvenska Serien next season
Östsvenska Serien 1916–17	Unknown	IF Verdandi	No Östsvenska Serien next season
Östsvenska Serien 1916–17	Unknown	Västerås SK	No Östsvenska Serien next season
Östsvenska Serien 1916–17	Unknown	Södermalms IK	Withdrew
Västsvenska Serien 1916–17	Unknown	IF Elfsborg	No Västsvenska Serien next season
Västsvenska Serien 1916–17	Unknown	GAIS	No Västsvenska Serien next season
Västsvenska Serien 1916–17	Unknown	IS Halmia	No Västsvenska Serien next season
Västsvenska Serien 1916–17	Unknown	IFK Halmstad	No Västsvenska Serien next season
Västsvenska Serien 1916–17	Unknown	Jönköpings IS	No Västsvenska Serien next season
Västsvenska Serien 1916–17	Unknown	IFK Uddevalla	No Västsvenska Serien next season
Västsvenska Serien 1916–17	Unknown	IK Wega	No Västsvenska Serien next season

== Domestic results ==
=== Svenska Serien 1916–17 ===

	Team	Pld	W	D	L	GF		GA	GD	Pts
1	IFK Göteborg	10	8	0	2	34	–	8	+26	16
2	Örgryte IS	10	6	1	3	27	–	15	+12	13
3	AIK	10	4	2	4	17	–	24	-7	10
4	Helsingborgs IF	10	4	1	5	15	–	19	-4	9
5	Djurgårdens IF	10	2	2	6	11	–	20	-9	6
6	IFK Norrköping	10	2	2	6	15	–	33	-18	6

=== Uppsvenska Serien 1916–17 ===

	Team	Pld	W	D	L	GF		GA	GD	Pts
1	Hammarby IF	10	6	4	0	23	–	11	+12	16
2	IK Sirius	10	7	1	2	28	–	18	+10	15
3	Gefle IF	10	5	2	3	21	–	17	+4	12
4	Johanneshofs IF	10	3	3	4	16	–	16	0	9
5	Sandvikens AIK	10	3	1	6	13	–	18	-5	7
6	IFK Gävle	10	0	1	9	5	–	26	-21	1

=== Mellansvenska Serien 1916–17 ===
	Team	Pld	W	D	L	GF		GA	GD	Pts
1	IFK Eskilstuna	14	11	1	2	48	–	18	+30	23
2	Mariebergs IK	14	9	4	1	38	–	13	+25	22
3	IK Sleipner	14	7	4	3	31	–	22	+9	18
4	Westermalms IF	14	7	4	3	31	–	27	+4	18
5	IFK Stockholm	14	5	2	7	24	–	39	-15	12
6	IFK Västerås	14	3	3	8	19	–	29	-10	9
7	IFK Uppsala	14	2	2	10	10	–	28	-18	6
8	Köpings IS	14	1	2	11	10	–	35	-25	4

=== Östsvenska Serien 1916–17 ===
	Team	Pld	W	D	L	GF		GA	GD	Pts
1	IK City	8	5	2	1	22	–	6	+16	12
2	IF Verdandi	8	2	4	2	16	–	9	+7	8
3	Västerås SK	8	4	0	4	12	–	16	-4	8
4	IF Swithiod	8	3	1	4	17	–	22	-5	7
5	Enköpings AIF	8	1	3	4	11	–	25	-14	5
–	Södermalms IK	6	4	0	2	16	–	9	+7	8

=== Västsvenska Serien 1916–17 ===
	Team	Pld	W	D	L	GF		GA	GD	Pts
1	GAIS	12	11	0	1	77	–	8	+69	22
2	IFK Uddevalla	12	10	0	2	40	–	20	+20	20
3	IS Halmia	12	8	1	3	32	–	11	+21	17
4	IF Elfsborg	12	6	0	6	26	–	33	-7	12
5	IK Wega	12	2	1	9	12	–	31	-19	5
6	IFK Halmstad	12	1	2	9	11	–	43	-32	4
7	Jönköpings IS	12	1	2	9	13	–	65	-52	4

=== Svenska Mästerskapet 1916 ===
Final

October 22, 1916

AIK	3–1	Djurgårdens IF

Stockholms Stadion, Stockholm

=== Svenska Mästerskapet 1917 ===
Final

November 11, 1917

Djurgårdens IF	3–1	AIK

Stockholms Stadion, Stockholm

=== Kamratmästerskapen 1916 ===
Final

December 10, 1916

IFK Malmö	4–3	IFK Eskilstuna

Malmö IP, Malmö

=== Kamratmästerskapen 1917 ===
Final

November 11, 1917

IFK Eskilstuna	w.o.	IFK Malmö

?, Eskilstuna

=== Wicanderska Välgörenhetsskölden 1916 ===
Final

December 3, 1916

AIK	5–1	Djurgårdens IF

Råsunda IP, Solna

== National team results ==
August 20, 1916
Friendly
№ 37

Sweden	2–3	United States
Törnqvist 7', 81'		Spalding 22'; Ellis 53'; Cooper 68'

Stockholms Stadion, Stockholm
Attendance: 15,000
Referee: Vestergaard (Denmark)

Sweden: Frithiof Rudén - Valdus Lund, Henning Svensson - Ragnar Wicksell, Konrad Törnqvist, Louis Groth - Harry Magnusson, Caleb Schylander, Karl Gustafsson, Erik Hjelm, Josef Appelgren.

October 1, 1916
Friendly
№ 38

Norway	0–0	Sweden

Gamle Frogner Stadion, Kristiania
Attendance: 12,000
Referee: Vestergaard (Denmark)

Sweden: Herbert Almqvist - Torsten Husén, Johannes Hellgren - Helmer Lundberg, Nils Wiklund, Verner Carlsson - Albin Sellin, Tor Levin, Ragnar Gunnarsson, Oskar Dahlström, Birger Carlsson.

October 8, 1916
Friendly
№ 39

Sweden	4–0	Denmark
Karlstrand 3'; Gustafsson 28'; Swensson 49'; Bergström 75'

Stockholms Stadion, Stockholm
Attendance: 20,000
Referee: Meerum-Terwogt (Netherlands)

Sweden: Herbert Almqvist - Theodor Malm, Ragnar Wicksell - Bruno Lindström, Götrik Frykman, Louis Groth - Rune Bergström, Karl Gustafsson, Iwar Swensson, Sten Söderberg, Carl Karlstrand.

June 3, 1917
Friendly
№ 40

Denmark	1–1	Sweden
Nielsen 75'		Börjesson 44'

Idrætsparken, Copenhagen
Attendance: 22,000
Referee: Vestergaard (Denmark)

Sweden: John Karlsson-Nottorp - Valdus Lund, Fritjof Hillén - Sven Friberg, Konrad Törnqvist, Henry Almén - Harry Magnusson, Caleb Schylander, Erik Börjesson, Erik Hjelm, Josef Appelgren.

August 19, 1917
Friendly
№ 41

Sweden	3–3	Norway
Ström 15', 47'; Malm 54'		Aas 22'; Gundersen 64', 81'

Olympia, Helsingborg
Attendance: 4,000
Referee: Vestergaard (Denmark)

Sweden: Erik Sjöstrand - Henry Svensson, Carl Carlsson - Thure Carlsson, Erik Sandberg, Thure Pettersson - Georg Bengtsson, Carl Ström, Otto Malm, Eric Bengtsson, Gustav Lundström.

September 16, 1917
Friendly
№ 42

Norway	0–2	Sweden
		Ekroth 8'; Gustafsson 77'

Gamle Frogner Stadion, Kristiania
Attendance: 18,000
Referee: Vestergaard (Denmark)

Sweden: Herbert Almqvist - Theodor Malm, Vidar Stenborg - Gustaf Carlson, Ragnar Wicksell, Einar Halling-Johansson - Rune Bergström, Walfrid Gunnarsson, Karl Gustafsson, Helge Ekroth, Gunnar Linder.

October 14, 1917
Friendly
№ 43

Sweden	1–2	Denmark
Gustafsson 47'		Olsen 9'; Grøthan 79'

Stockholms Stadion, Stockholm
Attendance: 20,000
Referee: Meerum-Terwogt (Netherlands)

Sweden: Herbert Almqvist - Theodor Malm, Valdus Lund - Gustaf Carlson, Ragnar Wicksell, Einar Halling-Johansson - Rune Bergström, Caleb Schylander, Karl Gustafsson, Helge Ekroth, Gunnar Linder.

== National team players in season 1916/17 ==
name	pos.	caps	goals	club
Henry "Tandpetarn" Almén	MF	1	0	IFK Göteborg
Herbert "Peta" Almqvist	GK	4	0	Westermalms IF
Josef "Päron" Appelgren	FW	2	0	Örgryte IS
Eric Bengtsson	FW	1	0	Hälsingborgs IF
Georg "Joije" Bengtsson	FW	1	0	Hälsingborgs IF
Rune Bergström	FW	3	1	AIK
Erik "Börje" Börjesson	FW	1	1	IFK Göteborg
Gustaf "Gurra" Carlson	MF	2	0	Mariebergs IK
Birger Carlsson	FW	1	0	Westermalms IF
Carl Carlsson	DF	1	0	Hälsingborgs IF
Thure Carlsson	MF	1	0	Hälsingborgs IF
Verner Carlsson	MF	1	0	Westermalms IF
Oskar "Nicke" Dahlström	FW	1	0	Mariebergs IK
Helge "Ekis" Ekroth	FW	2	1	AIK
Sven Friberg	MF	1	0	Örgryte IS
Götrik "Putte" Frykman	MF	1	0	Djurgårdens IF
Louis "Grålle" Groth	MF	2	0	AIK
Ragnar Gunnarsson	FW	1	0	Hammarby IF
Walfrid "Valle" Gunnarsson	FW	1	0	AIK
Karl "Köping" Gustafsson	FW	4	3	Djurgårdens IF
Einar Halling-Johansson	MF	2	0	IFK Eskilstuna
Johannes "Janne" Hellgren	DF	1	0	IFK Uppsala
Fritjof "Fritte" Hillén	DF	1	0	GAIS
Erik Hjelm	FW	2	0	IFK Göteborg
Torsten "Hussa" Husén	DF	1	0	IFK Stockholm
John "Stjärna" Karlsson-Nottorp	GK	1	0	IFK Göteborg
Carl Karlstrand	FW	1	1	Djurgårdens IF
Tor (Thore) Levin	FW	1	0	Mariebergs IK
Gunnar "Max" Linder	FW	2	0	Mariebergs IK
Bruno Lindström	MF	1	0	AIK
Valdus "Gobben" Lund	DF	3	0	IFK Göteborg
Helmer Lundberg	MF	1	0	Mariebergs IK
Gustav Lundström	FW	1	0	Hälsingborgs IF
Harry "Dicko" Magnusson	FW	2	0	Örgryte IS
Otto "Petter" Malm	FW	1	1	Hälsingborgs IF
Theodor "Todde" Malm	DF	3	0	AIK
Thure Pettersson	MF	1	0	IFK Malmö
Frithiof "Fritte" Rudén	GK	1	0	Djurgårdens IF
Erik Sandberg	MF	1	0	Hälsingborgs IF
Caleb "Kairo" Schylander	FW	3	0	IFK Göteborg
Albin Sellin	FW	1	0	Hammarby IF
Erik "Jack" Sjöstrand	GK	1	0	Hälsingborgs IF
Sten "Knata" Söderberg	FW	1	0	Djurgårdens IF
Vidar Stenborg	DF	1	0	IFK Eskilstuna
Carl Ström	FW	1	2	Hälsingborgs IF
Henning Svensson	DF	1	0	IFK Göteborg
Henry Svensson	DF	1	0	IFK Malmö
Iwar "Iffa-Sven" Swensson	FW	1	1	AIK
Konrad Törnqvist	MF	2	2	IFK Göteborg
Ragnar "Ragge" Wicksell	MF	4	0	Djurgårdens IF
Nils Wiklund	MF	1	0	Westermalms IF
