= 1918 in Swedish football =

The 1918 season in Swedish football, starting January 1918 and ending December 1918:

== Honours ==
=== Official titles ===
Title	Team	Reason
1918 Swedish Champions	IFK Göteborg	Winners of Svenska Mästerskapet

=== Competitions ===
Level	Competition	Team
1st level	Fyrkantserien 1918	IFK Göteborg
Championship Cup	Svenska Mästerskapet 1918	IFK Göteborg
Cup competition	Kamratmästerskapen 1918	IFK Eskilstuna

== Domestic results ==
=== Fyrkantserien 1918 ===

	Team	Pld	W	D	L	GF		GA	GD	Pts
1	IFK Göteborg	6	5	1	0	21	–	4	+17	11
2	Örgryte IS	6	3	2	1	13	–	4	+9	8
3	AIK	6	1	1	4	7	–	17	-10	3
4	Djurgårdens IF	6	0	2	4	3	–	19	-16	2

=== Svenska Mästerskapet 1918 ===
Final

October 6, 1918

IFK Göteborg	3–1	Helsingborgs IF

Stockholms Stadion, Stockholm

=== Kamratmästerskapen 1918 ===
Final

October 20, 1918

IFK Eskilstuna	5–0	IFK Hässleholm

Eskilstuna IP, Eskilstuna

== National team results ==
May 26, 1918
Friendly
№ 44

Sweden	2–0	Norway
Gustafsson 23'; Sterne 73'

Stockholms Stadion, Stockholm
Attendance: 10,000
Referee: Vestergaard (Denmark)

Sweden: Herbert Almqvist - Theodor Malm, Axel Larsson - Gustaf Carlson, Ragnar Wicksell, Einar Halling-Johansson - Thure Sterne, Vigor Lindberg, Karl Gustafsson, Helge Ekroth, Birger Carlsson.

June 2, 1918
Friendly
№ 45

Denmark	3–0	Sweden
Hansen 27', 52'; Nielsen 73'

Idrætsparken, Copenhagen
Attendance: 22,000
Referee: Andersen (Norway)

Sweden: John Karlsson-Nottorp - Valdus Lund, Henning Svensson - Bruno Lindström, Sven Friberg, Henry Almén - Harry Magnusson, Caleb Schylander, Erik Börjesson, Erik Hjelm, Josef Appelgren.

September 15, 1918
Friendly
№ 46

Norway	2–1	Sweden
Gundersen 49', 55'		Börjesson 68'

Gamle Frogner Stadion, Kristiania
Attendance: 20,000
Referee: Vestergaard (Denmark)

Sweden: Erik Sjöstrand - Valdus Lund, Henning Svensson - Karl Johansson, Sven Friberg, Henry Almén - Harry Magnusson, Herbert Karlsson, Erik Börjesson, Erik Hjelm, Mauritz Sandberg.

October 20, 1918
Friendly
№ 47

Sweden	1–2	Denmark
Hjelm 54'		Laursen 35'; Aaby 80'

Ullevi, Gothenburg
Attendance: 10,940
Referee: Andersen (Norway)

Sweden: Robert Zander - Valdus Lund, Henning Svensson - Karl Johansson, Konrad Törnqvist, Henry Almén - Harry Magnusson, Caleb Schylander, Herbert Karlsson, Erik Hjelm, Mauritz Sandberg.

== National team players in season 1918 ==
name	pos.	caps	goals	club
Henry "Tandpetarn" Almén	MF	3	0	IFK Göteborg
Herbert "Peta" Almqvist	GK	1	0	Westermalms IF
Josef "Päron" Appelgren	FW	1	0	Örgryte IS
Erik "Börje" Börjesson	FW	2	1	IFK Göteborg
Gustaf "Gurra" Carlson	MF	1	0	Mariebergs IK
Birger Carlsson	FW	1	0	Westermalms IF
Helge "Ekis" Ekroth	FW	1	0	AIK
Sven Friberg	MF	2	0	Örgryte IS
Karl "Köping" Gustafsson	FW	1	1	Djurgårdens IF
Einar Halling-Johansson	MF	1	0	IFK Eskilstuna
Erik Hjelm	FW	3	1	IFK Göteborg
Karl "Kalle Makarn" Johansson	MF	2	0	IFK Göteborg
Herbert "Murren" Karlsson	FW	2	0	IFK Göteborg
John "Stjärna" Karlsson-Nottorp	GK	1	0	IFK Göteborg
Axel "Back-Lasse" Larsson	DF	1	0	IF Elfsborg
Vigor "Kuta" Lindberg	FW	1	0	IK Sleipner
Bruno Lindström	MF	1	0	AIK
Valdus "Gobben" Lund	DF	3	0	IFK Göteborg
Harry "Dicko" Magnusson	FW	3	0	Örgryte IS
Theodor "Todde" Malm	DF	1	0	AIK
Mauritz "Moje" Sandberg	FW	2	0	IFK Göteborg
Caleb "Kairo" Schylander	FW	2	0	IFK Göteborg
Erik "Jack" Sjöstrand	GK	1	0	IFK Malmö
Thure "Turken" Sterne	FW	1	1	IFK Uppsala
Henning Svensson	DF	3	0	IFK Göteborg
Konrad Törnqvist	MF	1	0	IFK Göteborg
Ragnar "Ragge" Wicksell	MF	1	0	Djurgårdens IF
Robert Zander	GK	1	0	Örgryte IS
