= 1917 Svenska Mästerskapet final =

- Event: 1917 Svenska Mästerskapet
| Djurgårdens IF | AIK |
| 3 | 1 |
- Date: 11 November 1917
- Venue: Stockholm Olympic Stadium, Stockholm
- Referee: Erik Alstam, Gothenburg
- Attendance: 7,256

The 1917 Svenska Mästerskapet final was played on 11 November 1917 between the ninth-time finalists Djurgårdens IF and the seventh-time finalists AIK. The match decided the winner of 1917 Svenska Mästerskapet, the football cup to determine the Swedish champions. Djurgårdens IF won their third title with a 3–1 victory at Stockholm Olympic Stadium in Stockholm.

== Route to the final ==
=== Djurgårdens IF ===
Djurgårdens IF's route to the final
| | Opponent | Result |
|---|---|---|
| PR | Mariebergs IK (H) | 3–2 |
| QF | Sandvikens AIK (A) | 6–1 |
| SF | IFK Göteborg (H) | 0–0 |
| SF | IFK Göteborg (A, replay) | 2–1 |

In the preliminary round, Djurgårdens IF played Mariebergs IK at home in Stockholm on 14 August 1917 and won, 3–2. On 2 September 1917, Djurgården won the away-game quarter-final against Sandvikens AIK, 6–1 in Gävle. Djurgården then played IFK Göteborg in the semi-final, where the match at home on 21 October 1917 ended in a goalless draw and the away-game replay in Gothenburg on 4 November 1917 was won, 2–1.

Djurgårdens IF made their ninth appearance in a Svenska Mästerskapet final, having won two and lost six, including one to final opponents AIK in 1916.

=== AIK ===
AIK's route to the final
| | Opponent | Result |
|---|---|---|
| PR | Örgryte IS (H) | 5–1 |
| QF | IFK Eskilstuna (H) | 2–0 |
| SF | IK Sirius (A) | 1–0 |

In the preliminary round, AIK at home beat Örgryte IS, 5–1, on 12 August 1917. On 2 September 1917, AIK won the quarter-final against IFK Eskilstuna at home with 2–0. AIK then won the away-game semi-final against IK Sirius of Uppsala with 1–0 on 23 September 1917.

AIK were reigning champions by winning the previous final against final opponents Djurgården and made their seventh appearance in a Svenska Mästerskapet final, having won five, including the one against final opponents Djurgården, and lost one.

== Match details ==
11 November 1917

| Djurgårdens IF | 3–1 | AIK |
|---|---|---|
| Englund 45'; G. Johansson 78'; Olsson 85' | | Svedberg 25' |

Stockholm Olympic Stadium, Stockholm
Attendance: 7,256
Referee: Erik Alstam, Gothenburg

| GK | (Sweden) Frithiof Rudén |
| DF | (Sweden) Melcher Johansson |
| DF | (Sweden) Einar Hemming |
| MF | (Sweden) Bertil Nordenskjöld |
| MF | (Sweden) Ragnar Wicksell |
| MF | (Sweden) Karl Gustafsson |
| FW | (Sweden) Gottfrid Johansson |
| FW | (Sweden) Einar Olsson |
| FW | (Sweden) David Englund |
| FW | (Sweden) Sten Söderberg |
| FW | (Sweden) Henry Fredberg |

| GK | (Sweden) Erik Hillerström |
| DF | (Sweden) Theodor Malm |
| DF | (Sweden) Runo Olsson |
| MF | (Sweden) Bruno Lindström |
| MF | (Sweden) Knut Nilsson |
| MF | (Sweden) Thore Sundberg |
| FW | (Sweden) Rune Bergström |
| FW | (Sweden) Valfrid Gunnarsson |
| FW | (Sweden) Helmer Svedberg |
| FW | (Sweden) Helge Ekroth |
| FW | (Sweden) Edvin Holm |
