= 1920 Svenska Mästerskapet final =

- Event: 1920 Svenska Mästerskapet
Djurgårdens IF	IK Sleipner
1	0
- Date: 24 October 1920
- Venue: Stockholm Olympic Stadium, Stockholm
- Referee: David Andersson, Gothenburg
- Attendance: 8,000

The 1920 Svenska Mästerskapet final was played on 24 October 1920 between the eleventh-time finalists Djurgårdens IF and the first-time finalists IK Sleipner. The match decided the winner of 1920 Svenska Mästerskapet, the football cup to determine the Swedish champions. Djurgårdens IF won their fourth title with a 1–0 victory at Stockholm Olympic Stadium in Stockholm.

== Route to the final ==
=== Djurgårdens IF ===
Djurgårdens IF's route to the final
	Opponent	Result
PR	Mariebergs IK (H)	5–1
QF	Helsingborgs IF (A)	2–1
SF	IFK Göteborg (H)	1–0

Djurgården beat Mariebergs IK 5–1 in the preliminary round on 13 August 1920 at home. In the quarter-final, Djurgården won against Helsingborgs IF away, 2–1 on 19 September 1920. On 17 October 1920, Djurgården won the semi-final against IFK Göteborg at home in Stockholm, 1–0.

Djurgårdens IF made their eleventh appearance in a Svenska Mästerskapet final, having won three and lost seven, including the previous final against GAIS.

=== GAIS ===
IK Sleipner's route to the final
	Opponent	Result
2QR	IK City (H)	3–1
3QR	Kalmar IS (H)	3–1 (a.e.t.)
PR	IFK Norrköping (A)	4–0
QF	AIK (A)	1–1
QF	AIK (H, replay)	5–1
SF	IFK Uddevalla (H)	2–0

IK Sleipner entered in the second qualifying round and on 25 July 1920, beating IK City at home with 3–1. In the third qualifying round on 1 August 1920, IK Sleipner drew against Kalmar IS at home but won 3–1 after extra time. IK Sleipner was drawn against IFK Norrköping in the preliminary round, and the away-game match on 10 August 1920 ended in a 4–0 win. The away-game quarter-final against AIK on 3 October 1920 ended in a 1–1 draw and one week later, on 10 October 1920, IK Sleipner won the replay at home, 5–1. On 17 October 1920, IK Sleipner won the semi-final at home in Norrköping against IFK Uddevalla with 2–0.

IK Sleipner made their first Svenska Mästerskapet final.

== Match details ==
24 October 1920

Djurgårdens IF	1–0	IK Sleipner
Sundberg 30' (pen.)

Stockholm Olympic Stadium, Stockholm
Attendance: 8,000
Referee: David Andersson, Gothenburg

GK	(Sweden) Frithiof Rudén
DF	(Sweden) Bertil Nordenskjöld
DF	(Sweden) Einar Hemming
MF	(Sweden) Albert Öijermark
MF	(Sweden) Ragnar Wicksell
MF	(Sweden) Karl Gustafsson
FW	(Sweden) Gottfrid Johansson
FW	(Sweden) Sten Söderberg
FW	(Sweden) Harry Sundberg
FW	(Sweden) Edvin Fagerberg
FW	(Sweden) Karl Karlstrand

GK	(Sweden) Sven Jonsson
DF	(Sweden) Wilhelm Pettersson
DF	(Sweden) Einar Pettersson
MF	(Sweden) Nils Magnusson
MF	(Sweden) Sven Andersson
MF	(Sweden) Axel Corall	(substituted off) 20'
FW	(Sweden) Oskar Hagelin
FW	(Sweden) Gustav Edlund
FW	(Sweden) Bertil Appelskog
FW	(Sweden) Helmer Edlund
FW	(Sweden) David Pettersson
Substitutions:
	(Sweden) Axel Persson	(substituted in) 20'
