= 1916 Svenska Mästerskapet final =

- Event: 1916 Svenska Mästerskapet
AIK	Djurgårdens IF
3	1
- Date: 22 October 1916
- Venue: Stockholm Olympic Stadium, Stockholm
- Referee: Ernst Albihn, Norrköping
- Attendance: 7,500

The 1916 Svenska Mästerskapet final was played on 22 October 1916 between the sixth-time finalists AIK and the eight-time finalists Djurgårdens IF. The match decided the winner of 1916 Svenska Mästerskapet, the football cup to determine the Swedish champions. AIK won their fifth title with a 3–1 victory at Stockholm Olympic Stadium in Stockholm.

== Route to the final ==
=== AIK ===
AIK's route to the final
PR	IFK Västerås (H)	7–1
QF	Helsingborgs IF (H)	7–3
SF	IFK Göteborg (H)	2–1

AIK entered in the preliminary round and won, 7–1, against IFK Västerås at home in Stockholm on 13 August 1916. On 3 September 1916, AIK played the quarter-final against Helsingborgs IF at home and won, 7–3. In the semi-final on 24 September 1916, AIK won against IFK Göteborg at home, 2–1.

AIK made their sixth appearance in a Svenska Mästerskapet final, having won four and lost one.

=== Djurgårdens IF ===
Djurgårdens IF's route to the final
	Opponent	Result
PR	Hammarby IF (H)	7–1
QF	IFK Norrköping (H)	2–1
SF	Örgryte IS (A)	2–0

Djurgårdens IF entered in the preliminary round, where the team beat Hammarby IF, 7–1, at home in Stockholm on 10 August 1916. In the quarter-final, Djurgården won against IFK Norrköping, 2–1, at home on 3 September 1916. On 24 September 1916, Djurgården reached the final by winning an away-game semi-final against Örgryte IS with 2–0.

Djurgårdens IF were reigning champions by winning the previous final against Örgryte IS and made their eight appearance in a Svenska Mästerskapet final, having won two and lost five.

== Match details ==
22 October 1916

AIK	3–1	Djurgårdens IF
Ansén 10'; Bergström 21'; Gunnarsson 37'		Söderberg 74'; Nordenskjöld (red card)

Stockholm Olympic Stadium, Stockholm
Attendance: 7,500
Referee: Ernst Albihn, Norrköping

GK	(Sweden) Erik Hillerström
DF	(Sweden) Theodor Malm
DF	(Sweden) Runo Olsson
MF	(Sweden) Bruno Lindström
MF	(Sweden) Knut Nilsson
MF	(Sweden) Louis Groth
FW	(Sweden) Rune Bergström
FW	(Sweden) Valfrid Gunnarsson
FW	(Sweden) Ivar Svensson
FW	(Sweden) Helge Ekroth
FW	(Sweden) Karl Ansén

GK	(Sweden) Frithiof Rudén
DF	(Sweden) Gösta Backlund
DF	(Sweden) Einar Hemming
MF	(Sweden) Bertil Nordenskjöld
MF	(Sweden) Ragnar Wicksell
MF	(Sweden) Karl Gustafsson
FW	(Sweden) Gottfrid Johansson
FW	(Sweden) Einar Olsson
FW	(Sweden) Götrik Frykman
FW	(Sweden) Sten Söderberg
FW	(Sweden) Karl Karlstrand
