= 1918 Svenska Mästerskapet final =

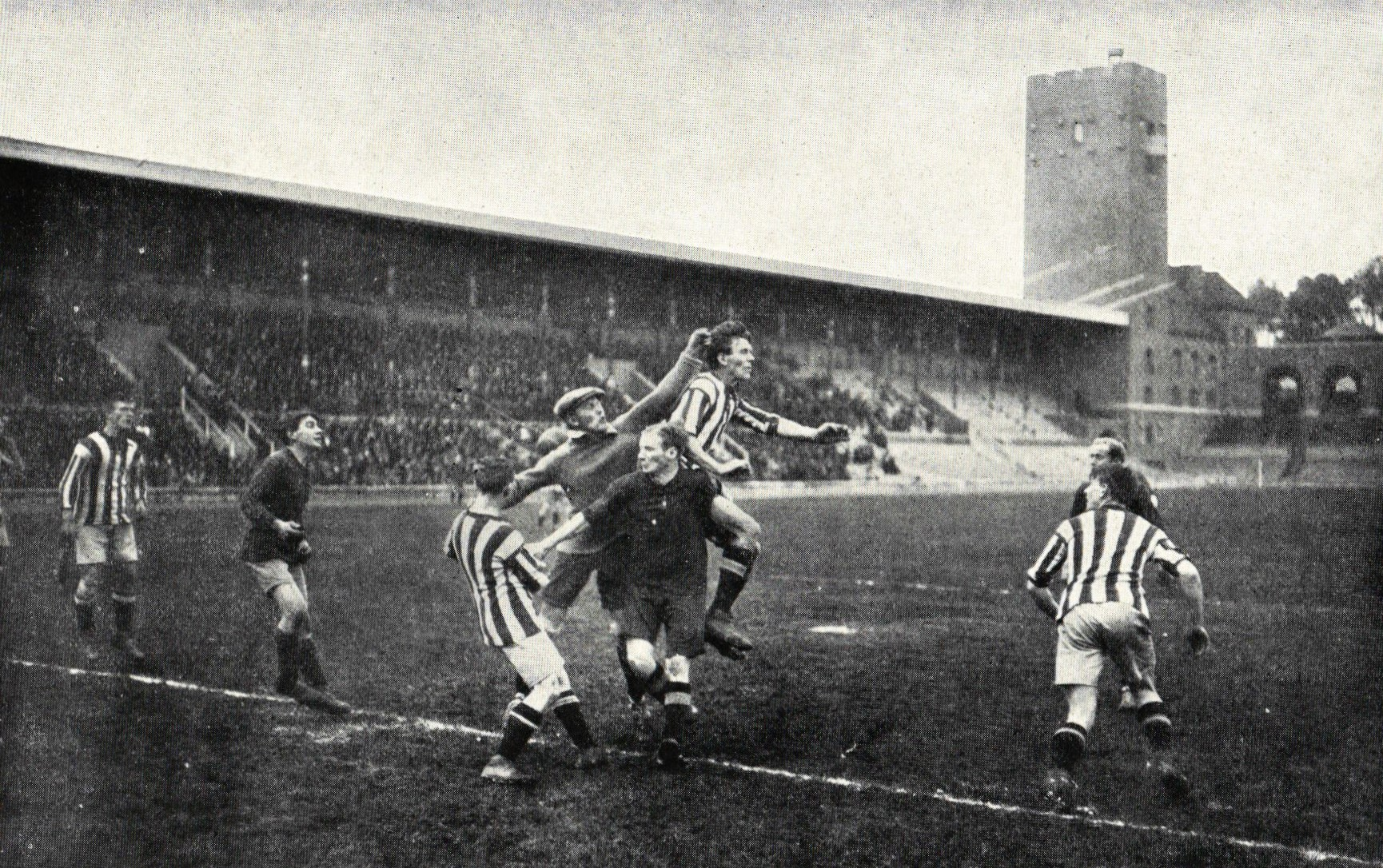
- The 1918 final at Stockholm Olympic Stadium
- Event: 1918 Svenska Mästerskapet
IFK Göteborg	Helsingborgs IF
5	0
- Date: 6 October 1918
- Venue: Stockholm Olympic Stadium, Stockholm
- Referee: Nils Gustafsson, Uppsala
- Attendance: 6,009

The 1918 Svenska Mästerskapet final was played on 6 October 1918 between the three-time finalists IFK Göteborg and the first-time finalists Helsingborgs IF. The match decided the winner of 1918 Svenska Mästerskapet, the football cup to determine the Swedish champions. IFK Göteborg won their third title with a 5–0 victory.

== Route to the final ==
=== IFK Göteborg ===
IFK Göteborg's route to the final
	Opponent	Result
PR	GAIS (H)	5–3
QF	Örgryte IS (H)	2–0
SF	IK Sirius (H)	6–1

IFK Göteborg entered in the preliminary round and won, 5–3, against GAIS on 21 August 1918 at home in Gothenburg. On 1 September 1918, IFK Göteborg won the quarter-final against Örgryte IS at home, 2–0. The semi-final against IK Sirius was played at home on 22 September 1918, and ended in a 6–1 win.

IFK Göteborg made their third appearance in a Svenska Mästerskapet final, having won their previous two.

=== Helsingborgs IF ===
Helsingborgs IF's route to the final
	Opponent	Result
PR	IFK Malmö (H)	4–1
QF	IFK Norrköping (A)	3–1
SF	Mariebergs IK (A)	2–1

Helsingborgs IF entered in the preliminary round against IFK Malmö and won 4–1 on 18 August 1918 at home in Helsingborg. On, 1 September 1918, Helsingborgs IF won the away-game quarter-final against IFK Norrköping in Norrköping, 3–1. The away-game semi-final against Mariebergs IK was played in Stockholm on 22 September 1918 and resulted in a Helsingborg win, 2–1.

Helsingborgs IF made their second appearance in a Svenska Mästerskapet final, having lost their previous in 1914 .

== Match details ==
6 October 1918

IFK Göteborg	5–0	Helsingborgs IF
Hjelm 26'; Eiserman 2–0; Törnkvist 3–0; Carlsson 4–0, 5–0 (pen.)

Stockholm Olympic Stadium, Stockholm
Attendance: 6,009
Referee: Nils Gustafsson, Uppsala

IFK Göteborg	Helsingborgs IF

GK	(Sweden) Sven Rylander
DF	(Sweden) Valdus Lund
DF	(Sweden) Henning Svensson
MF	(Sweden) Carl Ohlsson
MF	(Sweden) Konrad Törnkvist
MF	(Sweden) Henry Almén
FW	(Sweden) Erik Eiserman
FW	(Sweden) Caleb Schylander
FW	(Sweden) Herbert Carlsson
FW	(Sweden) Erik Hjelm
FW	(Sweden) Mauritz Sandberg

GK	(Sweden) Sigfrid Lindberg
DF	(Sweden) Otto Pettersson
DF	(Sweden) Gunnar Espling
MF	(Sweden) Carl Carlsson
MF	(Sweden) Erik Sandberg
MF	(Sweden) John Ljungkvist
FW	(Sweden) Georg Bengtsson
FW	(Sweden) Eric Bengtsson
FW	(Sweden) Otto Malm
FW	(Sweden) Harald Håkansson
FW	(Sweden) Carl Ström
