= 1919 Svenska Mästerskapet final =

- Event: 1919 Svenska Mästerskapet
| GAIS | Djurgårdens IF |
| 4 | 1 |
- Date: 19 October 1919
- Venue: Stockholm Olympic Stadium, Stockholm
- Referee: Arthur Björklund, Norrköping
- Attendance: 10,525

The 1919 Svenska Mästerskapet final was played on 19 October 1919 between the first-time finalists GAIS and the tenth-time finalists Djurgårdens IF. The match decided the winner of 1919 Svenska Mästerskapet, the football cup to determine the Swedish champions. GAIS won their first title with a 4–1 victory at Stockholm Olympic Stadium in Stockholm.

== Route to the final ==
=== GAIS ===
GAIS's route to the final
| | Opponent | Result |
|---|---|---|
| 2QR | IK Virgo (H) | 5–2 |
| 3QR | IS Halmia (A) | 1–1 |
| 3QR | IS Halmia (H, replay) | 3–0 |
| PR | IFK Göteborg (H) | 3–0 |
| QF | IFK Norrköping (A) | 3–1 |
| SF | Helsingborgs IF (H) | 7–1 |

GAIS entered in the second qualifying round and won at home in Gothenburg against IK Virgo, 5–2 on 13 June 1919. In third qualifying round, GAIS was drawn to an against IS Halmia of Halmstad and after away-game a draw, 1–1, on 27 July 1919, GAIS won the home-game replay in Gothenburg with 3–0 on 3 August 1919. On 13 August 1919, GAIS won against IFK Göteborg with 3–0 at home in preliminary round. In the quarter-final, GAIS played IFK Norrköping on 7 September 1919, winning the away-game in Norrköping with 3–1. On 28 September 1919, GAIS beat Helsingborgs IF in the semi-final at home, 7–1.

GAIS made their first Svenska Mästerskapet final.

=== Djurgårdens IF ===
Djurgårdens IF's route to the final
| | Opponent | Result |
|---|---|---|
| 3QR | IF Linnéa (H) | 4–0 |
| PR | Hammarby IF (H) | 1–1 |
| PR | Hammarby IF (A) | 2–1 (a.e.t.) |
| QF | Sandvikens AIK (H) | 2–0 |
| SF | IFK Eskilstuna (H) | 1–0 |

Djurgårdens IF entered in the third qualifying round, winning 4–0 against IF Linnéa at home on 16 July 1919. On 12 August 1919, Djurgården drew Hammarby IF, 1–1, at home in the preliminary round. The away-game replay on 29 August 1919 also ended in a draw after full time, with Djurgården winning 2–1 after extra time. Djurgården was drawn against Sandvikens AIK in the quarter-final and won 2–0 at home on 7 September 1919. On 28 September 1919, Djurgården won the semi-final against IFK Eskilstuna, 1–0 at home.

Djurgårdens IF made their tenth appearance in a Svenska Mästerskapet final, having won three and lost six.

== Match details ==
19 October 1919

| GAIS | 4–1 | Djurgårdens IF |
|---|---|---|
| Wenzel 7'; Bergman 13', 72'; Hillén 75' (pen.) | | Wicksell 62' |

Stockholm Olympic Stadium, Stockholm
Attendance: 10,525
Referee: Arthur Björklund, Norrköping

| GK | (Sweden) Ivan Holmdahl |
| DF | (Sweden) Wictor Björkman |
| DF | (Sweden) Fritjof Hillén |
| MF | (Sweden) Gustaf Johansson |
| MF | (Sweden) John Johansson |
| MF | (Sweden) Nils Karlsson |
| FW | (Sweden) Rune Wenzel |
| FW | (Sweden) Albert Olsson |
| FW | (Sweden) Anders Bergman |
| FW | (Sweden) Joel Björkman |
| FW | (Sweden) Fridolf Johnson |

| GK | (Sweden) Frithiof Rudén |
| DF | (Sweden) Otto Elmblad |
| DF | (Sweden) Einar Hemming |
| MF | (Sweden) Bertil Nordenskjöld |
| MF | (Sweden) Ragnar Wicksell |
| MF | (Sweden) Karl Gustafsson |
| FW | (Sweden) Gottfrid Johansson |
| FW | (Sweden) Albert Öijermark |
| FW | (Sweden) Sune Andersson |
| FW | (Sweden) Sten Söderberg |
| FW | (Sweden) Karl Karlstrand |
