= List of Sweden national football team hat-tricks =

This page is a list of hat-tricks scored by the Sweden men's national football team. Since Sweden's first international association football match on 12 July 1908 against Norway, there have been 92 recorded hat-tricks, with the first two being scored by Erik Bergström and Erik Börjesson in this first match. The most goals scored in a single match is six, achieved by Albin Hallbäck against Latvia in 1927 during a friendly.

The record for most hat-tricks scored for the Swedish national team is nine, a record held by Sven Rydell. The team which Sweden have scored the most hat-tricks against is Finland, scoring 25 different hat-tricks against them. Two Swedes have scored hat-tricks at the FIFA World Cup; with both Gustav Wetterström and Harry Andersson scoring hat-tricks against Cuba at the 1938 FIFA World Cup.

Sweden have conceded 31 hat-tricks in total, with England and Denmark scoring four each. The record for the most hat-tricks scored against Sweden is two, with the record being held by Sándor Kocsis of Hungary; with the most goals scored in a single game being six, achieved by Poul Nielsen of Denmark in 1913. The most notable hat-trick scored against Sweden was scored by Ademir de Menezes for Brazil at the 1950 FIFA World Cup, a game in which Sweden lost 1–7.

== Hat-tricks scored by Sweden ==
Scores and results list Sweden's goal tally first.

| No. | Player | Date | Opponent | Venue | Goals | Result | Competition | Ref. |
|---|---|---|---|---|---|---|---|---|
| 1 | Erik Bergström | 12 July 1908 | Norway | Balders Hage, Gothenburg, Sweden | 4 – (27', 29', 44', 89') | 11–3 | Friendly | |
| 2 | Erik Börjesson | 12 July 1908 | Norway | Balders Hage, Gothenburg, Sweden | 4 – (24', 60', 75', 86') | 11–3 | Friendly | |
| 3 | Hjalmar Lorichs | 27 June 1912 | Finland | Råsunda IP, Solna, Sweden | 3 – (11', 50', 65') | 7–1 | Friendly | |
| 4 | Karl Gustafsson | 8 June 1913 | Norway | Stockholm Olympic Stadium, Stockholm, Sweden | 4 – (23', 36', 50', 52') | 9–0 | Friendly | |
| 5 | Sten Söderberg | 25 October 1914 | Norway | Råsunda IP, Solna, Sweden | 3 – (20', 65', 68') | 7–0 | Friendly | |
| 6 | Helge Ekroth | 25 October 1914 | Norway | Råsunda IP, Solna, Sweden | 3 – (5', 80', 86') | 7–0 | Friendly | |
| 7 | Ivar Svensson | 24 October 1915 | Norway | Stockholm Olympic Stadium, Stockholm, Sweden | 3 – (10', 14', 61') | 5–2 | Friendly | |
| 8 | Karl Gustafsson (2) | 2 July 1916 | Norway | Stockholm Olympic Stadium, Stockholm, Sweden | 3 – (30', 61', 80') | 6–0 | Friendly | |
| 9 | Herbert Carlsson | 14 August 1919 | Netherlands | Stockholm Olympic Stadium, Stockholm, Sweden | 3 – (6', 20', 43') | 4–1 | Friendly | |
| 10 | Herbert Carlsson (2) | 12 October 1919 | Denmark | Stockholm Olympic Stadium, Stockholm, Sweden | 3 – (2', 35', 88') | 3–0 | Friendly | |
| 11 | Herbert Carlsson (3) | 28 August 1920 | Greece | Olympisch Stadion, Antwerp, Belgium | 5 – (15', 20', 21', 51', 85') | 9–0 | 1920 Summer Olympics | |
| 12 | Albin Dahl | 24 September 1922 | Norway | Gressbanen, Oslo, Norway | 3 – (30', 40', 75') | 5–0 | Friendly | |
| 13 | Gunnar Paulsson | 20 June 1923 | Finland | Strömvallen, Gävle, Sweden | 3 – (31', 48', 64') | 5–4 | Friendly | |
| 14 | Sven Rydell | 18 May 1924 | Poland | Råsunda IP, Solna, Sweden | 3 – (5', 61', 83') | 5–1 | Friendly | |
| 15 | Putte Kock | 29 May 1924 | Belgium | Stade olympique, Colombes, France | 3 – (8', 24', 77') | 8–1 | 1924 Summer Olympics | |
| 16 | Sven Rydell (2) | 29 May 1924 | Belgium | Stade olympique, Colombes, France | 3 – (20', 61', 83') | 8–1 | 1924 Summer Olympics | |
| 17 | Sven Rydell (3) | 29 June 1924 | Egypt | Stockholm Olympic Stadium, Stockholm, Sweden | 4 – (19', 21', 24', 56') | 5–0 | Friendly | |
| 18 | Putte Kock (2) | 28 July 1924 | Finland | Helsinki, FInland | 3 – (35', 77', 84' pen.) | 7–5 | Friendly | |
| 19 | Sven Rydell (4) | 21 September 1924 | Norway | Råsunda IP, Solna, Sweden | 3 – (66', 78', 89') | 6–1 | Friendly | |
| 20 | Filip Johansson | 9 June 1925 | Finland | Slottsskogsvallen, Gothenburg, Sweden | 4 – (8', 23', 72' pen., 85') | 4–0 | Friendly | |
| 21 | Filip Johansson (2) | 12 July 1925 | Hungary | Råsunda IP, Solna, Sweden | 3 – (3'. 27', 50') | 6–2 | Friendly | |
| 22 | Sven Rydell (5) | 23 August 1925 | Norway | Gressbanen, Oslo, Norway | 4 – (22', 42', 44', 62') | 7–3 | Friendly | |
| 23 | Filip Johansson (3) | 1 November 1925 | Poland | Stadion Cracovii, Kraków, Poland | 3 – (5', 29', 31') | 6–2 | Friendly | |
| 24 | Albin Hallbäck | 29 May 1927 | Latvia | Råsunda IP, Solna, Sweden | 6 – (9', 30', 31', 44', 77', 84') | 12–0 | Friendly | |
| 25 | Sven Rydell (6) | 29 May 1927 | Latvia | Råsunda IP, Solna, Sweden | 3 – (11', 65', 85') | 12–0 | Friendly | |
| 26 | Sven Rydell (7) | 26 June 1927 | Norway | Gressbanen, Oslo, Norway | 3 – (18', 23', 65') | 5–3 | Friendly | |
| 27 | Tore Keller | 1 July 1927 | Estonia | Idrottsparken, Norrköping, Sweden | 3 – (2', 25', 79') | 3–1 | Friendly | |
| 28 | Ernst Lööf | 6 July 1928 | Latvia | Latvijas Universitātes stadions, Riga, Latvia | 3 – (14', 16', 35') | 4–0 | Friendly | |
| 29 | Sven Rydell (8) | 9 June 1929 | Netherlands | Råsunda IP, Solna, Sweden | 3 – (19', 73', 75') | 6–2 | Friendly | |
| 30 | Rupert Andersson | 28 July 1929 | Latvia | Malmö IP, Malmö, Sweden | 3 – (46', 77', 87') | 10–0 | Friendly | |
| 31 | Harry Lundahl | 6 July 1930 | Norway | Råsunda IP, Solna, Sweden | 3 – (5', 13', 48') | 6–3 | 1929–32 Nordic Football Championship | |
| 32 | John Sundberg | 18 July 1930 | Estonia | Kadriorg Stadium, Tallinn, Estonia | 3 – (10', 44', 73') | 5–1 | Friendly | |
| 33 | Bertil Karlsson | 28 September 1930 | Finland | Töölön Pallokenttä, Helsinki, Finland | 3 – (26', 53', 64') | 4–4 | Friendly | |
| 34 | Sune Zetterberg | 3 July 1931 | Finland | Råsunda IP, Solna, Sweden | 4 – (18', 25', 30', 55') | 8–2 | Friendly | |
| 35 | Evert Hansson | 3 July 1931 | Finland | Råsunda IP, Solna, Sweden | 3 – (35', 65', 73') | 8–2 | Friendly | |
| 36 | John Sundberg (2) | 26 July 1931 | Latvia | Arosvallen, Västerås, Sweden | 3 – (10', 44', 78') | 6–0 | Friendly | |
| 37 | Sven Rydell (9) | 16 May 1932 | Finland | Råsunda IP, Solna, Sweden | 3 – (12', 20', 62') | 7–1 | Friendly | |
| 38 | John Nilsson | 25 September 1932 | Lithuania | Råsunda IP, Solna, Sweden | 4 – (59', 60', 65', 75') | 8–1 | Friendly | |
| 39 | Tore Keller (2) | 23 May 1934 | Poland | Råsunda IP, Solna, Sweden | 3 – (40', 70', 76') | 4–2 | Friendly | |
| 40 | Bertil Ericsson | 17 June 1934 | Denmark | Parken, Copenhagen, Denmark | 3 – (35', 60', 62') | 5–3 | 1933–36 Nordic Football Championship | |
| 41 | Erik Persson | 23 September 1934 | Finland | Töölön Pallokenttä, Helsinki, Finland | 3 – (6', 42', 87') | 4–5 | 1933–36 Nordic Football Championship | |
| 42 | Axel Nilsson | 1 September 1935 | Romania | Råsunda IP, Solna, Sweden | 3 – (70', 73', 87') | 7–1 | Friendly | |
| 43 | Sven Jonasson | 21 June 1936 | Switzerland | Stockholm Olympic Stadium, Stockholm, Sweden | 3 – (27', 56', 59') | 5–2 | Friendly | |
| 44 | Gustav Wetterström | 20 June 1937 | Estonia | Råsunda Stadium, Solna, Sweden | 3 – (73', 77', 84') | 7–2 | 1938 FIFA World Cup qualification | |
| 45 | Gustav Wetterström (2) | 12 June 1938 | Cuba | Stade du Fort Carré, Antibes, France | 3 – (22', 37', 44') | 8–0 | 1938 FIFA World Cup | |
| 46 | Harry Andersson | 12 June 1938 | Cuba | Stade du Fort Carré, Antibes, France | 3 – (9', 61', 89') | 8–0 | 1938 FIFA World Cup | |
| 47 | Erik Persson (2) | 9 June 1939 | Finland | Råsunda Stadium, Solna, Sweden | 3 – (30', 64', 67') | 5–1 | 1937–47 Nordic Football Championship | |
| 48 | Knut Johansson | 29 August 1940 | Finland | Helsinki, Finland | 3 – (13', 34', 85') | 3–2 | Friendly | |
| 49 | Knut Johansson (2) | 22 September 1940 | Finland | Råsunda Stadium, Solna, Sweden | 3 – (58', 59', 74') | 5–0 | Friendly | |
| 50 | Henry Carlsson | 5 October 1941 | Germany | Råsunda Stadium, Solna, Sweden | 3 – (24', 49', 80') | 4–2 | Friendly | |
| 51 | Gunnar Gren | 26 August 1945 | Finland | Gamla Ullevi, Gothenburg, Sweden | 3 – (8', 60', 77') | 7–2 | Friendly | |
| 52 | Börje Tapper | 30 September 1945 | Finland | Helsinki, Finland | 5 – (36', 59', 81', 82', 88') | 6–1 | Friendly | |
| 53 | Gunnar Nordahl | 21 October 1945 | Norway | Råsunda Stadium, Solna, Sweden | 4 – (12', 26', 82', 89') | 10–0 | Friendly | |
| 54 | Gunnar Gren (2) | 7 July 1946 | Switzerland | Råsunda Stadium, Solna, Sweden | 4 – (30', 55', 61', 79') | 7–2 | Friendly | |
| 55 | Gustaf Nilsson | 15 September 1946 | Finland | Helsinki, Finland | 3 | 7–0 | Friendly | |
| 56 | Gunnar Nordahl (2) | 28 June 1947 | Norway | Olympia, Helsingborg, Sweden | 4 – (18', 56', 59', 85') | 5–1 | Friendly | |
| 57 | Gunnar Nordahl (3) | 24 August 1947 | Finland | Ryavallen, Borås, Sweden | 3 – (5', 30', 40') | 7–0 | 1937–47 Nordic Football Championship | |
| 58 | Gunnar Nordahl (4) | 5 August 1948 | South Korea | Selhurst Park, London, England | 4 | 12–0 | 1948 Summer Olympics | |
| 59 | Henry Carlsson (2) | 5 August 1948 | South Korea | Selhurst Park, London, England | 3 | 12–0 | 1948 Summer Olympics | |
| 60 | Gunnar Nordahl (5) | 19 September 1948 | Norway | Ullevaal Stadion, Oslo, Norway | 5 – (24', 44', 62', 74', 80') | 5–3 | 1948–51 Nordic Football Championship | |
| 61 | Egon Jönsson | 2 October 1949 | Finland | Malmö IP, Malmö, Sweden | 3 – (7', 9', 17') | 8–1 | 1948–51 Nordic Football Championship | |
| 62 | Ingvar Rydell | 2 October 1949 | Finland | Malmö IP, Malmö, Sweden | 3 – (24', 75', 83') | 8–1 | 1948–51 Nordic Football Championship | |
| 63 | Karl-Erik Palmér | 13 November 1949 | Republic of Ireland | Dalymount Park, Dublin, Ireland | 3 – (4', 40', 68') | 3–1 | 1950 FIFA World Cup qualification | |
| 64 | Lars Råberg | 21 September 1952 | Finland | Helsinki, Finland | 3 – (10', 48', 58') | 8–1 | 1952–55 Nordic Football Championship | |
| 65 | Hasse Persson | 21 September 1952 | Finland | Helsinki, Finland | 3 – (24', 50', 83') | 8–1 | 1952–55 Nordic Football Championship | |
| 66 | Birger Eklund | 15 August 1954 | Finland | Helsinki Olympic Stadium, Helsinki, London | 3 – (7', 30', 48') | 10–1 | 1952–55 Nordic Football Championship | |
| 67 | Kurt Hamrin | 15 August 1954 | Finland | Helsinki Olympic Stadium, Helsinki, London | 3 – (6', 71', 80') | 10–1 | 1952–55 Nordic Football Championship | |
| 68 | Nils-Åke Sandell | 10 October 1954 | Denmark | Råsunda Stadium, Solna, Sweden | 3 – (12', 38', 60') | 5–2 | 1952–55 Nordic Football Championship | |
| 69 | Henry Källgren | 19 June 1957 | Finland | Helsinki Olympic Stadium, Helsinki, London | 3 | 5–1 | Friendly | |
| 70 | Gunnar Gren (3) | 22 September 1957 | Finland | Råsunda Stadium, Solna, Sweden | 3 | 5–1 | 1956–59 Nordic Football Championship | |
| 71 | Torbjörn Jonsson | 20 August 1958 | Finland | Helsinki Olympic Stadium, Helsinki, London | 3 | 7–1 | 1956–59 Nordic Football Championship | |
| 72 | Leif Skiöld | 12 November 1962 | Israel | The National Stadium, Ramat Gan, Israel | 3 – (12', 82', 86') | 4–0 | Friendly | |
| 73 | Tom Turesson | 18 September 1966 | Norway | Ullevaal Stadion, Oslo, Norway | 3 – (60', 63', 70') | 4–2 | 1964–67 Nordic Football Championship | |
| 74 | Inge Ejderstedt | 19 February 1968 | Israel | Bloomfield Stadium, Tel Aviv, Israel | 3 – (25', 27', 44') | 3–0 | Friendly | |
| 75 | Ove Kindvall | 9 October 1968 | Norway | Råsunda Stadium, Solna, Sweden | 3 – (37', 58', 61') | 5–0 | 1970 FIFA World Cup qualification | |
| 76 | Ralf Edström | 6 August 1972 | Soviet Union | Råsunda Stadium, Solna, Sweden | 3 – (16', 54', 84') | 4–4 | Friendly | |
| 77 | Ralf Edström | 15 October 1972 | Malta | Gamla Ullevi, Gothenburg, Sweden | 3 – (2', 32', 64') | 7–0 | 1974 FIFA World Cup qualification | |
| 78 | Torbjörn Nilsson | 17 November 1979 | Singapore | National Stadium, Kallang, Singapore | 3 – (51', 81', 88') | 5–0 | Friendly | |
| 79 | Mats Jingblad | 16 November 1983 | Trinidad and Tobago | Queen's Park Oval, Port of Spain, Trinidad and Tobago | 3 – (48', 54', 88') | 5–0 | Friendly | |
| 80 | Mats Jingblad (2) | 19 November 1983 | Barbados | Barbados National Stadium, Saint Michael, Barbados | 3 – (75', 80', 85') | 4–0 | Friendly | |
| 81 | Kennet Andersson | 1 May 1991 | Austria | Råsunda Stadium, Solna, Sweden | 3 – (12', 34', 88') | 6–0 | Friendly | |
| 82 | Tomas Brolin | 2 June 1993 | Israel | Råsunda Stadium, Solna, Sweden | 3 – (16', 41', 66') | 5–0 | 1994 FIFA World Cup qualification | |
| 83 | Henrik Larsson | 6 June 2001 | Moldova | Gamla Ullevi, Gothenburg, Sweden | 4 – (38' pen., 58', 68' pen., 79' pen.) | 6–0 | 2002 FIFA World Cup qualification | |
| 84 | Mattias Jonson | 7 June 2003 | San Marino | San Marino Stadium, Serravalle, San Marino | 3 – (16', 60', 71') | 6–0 | UEFA Euro 2004 qualifying | |
| 85 | Zlatan Ibrahimović | 4 September 2004 | Malta | National Stadium, Ta' Qali, Malta | 4 – (4', 11', 14', 71') | 7–0 | 2006 FIFA World Cup qualification | |
| 86 | Zlatan Ibrahimović (2) | 7 June 2011 | Finland | Råsunda Stadium, Solna, Sweden | 3 – (31', 35', 53') | 5–0 | UEFA Euro 2012 qualifying | |
| 87 | Zlatan Ibrahimović (3) | 14 November 2012 | England | Nationalarenan, Stockholm, Sweden | 4 – (20', 77', 84', 91') | 4–2 | Friendly | |
| 88 | Zlatan Ibrahimović (4) | 14 August 2013 | Norway | Nationalarenan, Stockholm, Sweden | 3 – (2', 28', 57') | 4–2 | Friendly | |
| 89 | Marcus Berg | 7 October 2017 | Luxembourg | Nationalarenan, Stockholm, Sweden | 4 – (18', 37', 54', 71') | 8–0 | 2018 FIFA World Cup qualification | |
| 90 | Viktor Gyökeres | 19 November 2024 | Azerbaijan | Nationalarenan, Stockholm, Sweden | 4 – (26', 37', 58', 70') | 6–0 | 2024–25 UEFA Nations League C | |
| 91 | Ken Sema | 10 June 2025 | Algeria | Nationalarenan, Stockholm, Sweden | 3 – (14', 39', 50' pen.) | 4–3 | Friendly | |
| 92 | Viktor Gyökeres (2) | 26 March 2026 | Ukraine | Estadi Ciutat de València, Valencia, Spain | 3 – (6', 51', 73' pen.) | 3–1 | 2026 FIFA World Cup qualification | |

== Hat-tricks conceded by Sweden ==
Scores and results list Sweden's goal tally first.

| No. | Player | Date | Opponent | Venue | Goals | Result | Competition | Ref. |
|---|---|---|---|---|---|---|---|---|
| 1 | Arthur Berry | 8 September 1908 | England | Walhalla IP, Gothenburg, Sweden | 4 | 1–6 | Friendly | |
| 2 | Clyde Purnell | 20 October 1908 | Great Britain | White City Stadium, London, England | 4 – (25', 31', 64', 82') | 1–12 | 1908 Summer Olympics | |
| 3 | Harry Stapley | 6 November 1909 | England | Anlaby Road, Hull, England | 3 | 0–7 | Friendly | |
| 4 | Syd Owen | 6 November 1909 | England | Anlaby Road, Hull, England | 3 | 0–7 | Friendly | |
| 5 | Otto Dumke | 18 June 1911 | Germany | Råsunda IP, Solna, Sweden | 3 – (13', 44', 83') | 2–4 | Friendly | |
| 6 | Kristian Gyldenstein | 25 May 1913 | Denmark | Parken, Copenhagen, Denmark | 3 – (17', 56', 61') | 0–8 | Friendly | |
| 7 | Poul Nielsen | 5 October 1913 | Denmark | Stockholm Olympic Stadium, Stockholm, Sweden | 6 – (5', 10', 29', 47', 50', 53') | 0–10 | Friendly | |
| 8 | Kaare Engebretsen | 14 September 1919 | Norway | Gamla Ullevi, Gothenburg, Sweden | 3 – (20', 21', 32') | 1–5 | Friendly | |
| 9 | György Orth | 6 November 1921 | Hungary | Üllői úti stadion, Budapest, Hungary | 3 – (15', 49', 54') | 2–4 | Friendly | |
| 10 | Johann Horvath | 5 July 1925 | Austria | Råsunda IP, Solna, Sweden | 3 – (11', 22', 60') | 2–4 | Friendly | |
| 11 | Otto Harder | 20 June 1926 | Germany | Nuremberg, Germany | 3 – (21', 35', 43') | 3–3 | Friendly | |
| 12 | Richard Hofmann | 23 June 1929 | Germany | Cologne, Germany | 3 – (27', 63', 85') | 0–3 | Friendly | |
| 13 | Pauli Jørgensen | 22 June 1930 | Denmark | Parken, Copenhagen, Denmark | 3 – (17', 66', 87') | 1–6 | 1929–32 Nordic Football Championship | |
| 14 | Jørgen Juve | 6 July 1930 | Norway | Råsunda IP, Solna, Sweden | 3 – (16', 42', 47') | 3–6 | 1929–32 Nordic Football Championship | |
| 15 | Lauri Lehtinen | 28 September 1930 | Finland | Töölön Pallokenttä, Helsinki, Finland | 3 – (9', 40', 41') | 4–4 | Friendly | |
| 16 | Reidar Kvammen | 26 July 1936 | Norway | Råsunda IP, Solna, Sweden | 3 – (17' pen., 29', 65') | 3–4 | Friendly | |
| 17 | Freddie Steele | 17 May 1937 | England | Råsunda Stadium, Solna, Sweden | 3 – (15', 25', 33') | 0–4 | Friendly | |
| 18 | Josef Bican | 7 August 1938 | Czechoslovakia | Råsunda Stadium, Solna, Sweden | 3 – (28', 33', 75') | 2–6 | Friendly | |
| 19 | Kaj Hansen | 20 October 1940 | Denmark | Parken, Copenhagen, Denmark | 3 – (21', 35', 37') | 3–3 | Friendly | |
| 20 | Stan Mortensen | 19 November 1947 | England | Arsenal Stadium, London, England | 3 – (13', 26', 89') | 2–4 | Friendly | |
| 21 | Sándor Kocsis | 20 November 1949 | Hungary | Megyeri úti Stadion, Újpest, Hungary | 3 – (8', 49', 63') | 0–5 | Friendly | |
| 22 | Ademir de Menezes | 9 July 1950 | Brazil | Maracanã Stadium, Rio de Janeiro, Brazil | 4 – (17', 37', 51', 59') | 1–7 | 1950 FIFA World Cup | |
| 23 | Ríkharður Jónsson | 29 June 1951 | Iceland | Melavöllur, Reykjavík, Iceland | 4 – (32', 38', 47', 78') | 3–4 | Friendly | |
| 24 | Sándor Kocsis (2) | 11 May 1955 | Hungary | Råsunda Stadium, Solna, Sweden | 3 – (16', 30', 79') | 3–7 | Friendly | |
| 25 | Eduard Streltsov | 26 June 1955 | Soviet Union | Råsunda Stadium, Solna, Sweden | 3 – (3', 14', 43') | 0–6 | Friendly | |
| 26 | Dejan Savićević | 4 September 1991 | Yugoslavia | Råsunda Stadium, Solna, Sweden | 3 – (33', 66', 75') | 4–3 | Friendly | |
| 27 | Sacha Kljestan | 24 January 2009 | United States | Home Depot Center, Carson, United States | 3 – (17', 39' pen., 74') | 2–3 | Friendly | |
| 28 | André Schürrle | 15 October 2013 | Germany | Nationalarenan, Stockholm, Sweden | 3 – (57', 66', 76') | 3–5 | 2014 FIFA World Cup qualification | |
| 29 | Cristiano Ronaldo | 19 November 2013 | Portugal | Nationalarenan, Stockholm, Sweden | 3 – (50', 77', 79') | 2–3 | 2014 FIFA World Cup qualification | |
| 30 | Aleksandar Mitrović | 24 September 2022 | Serbia | Rajko Mitić Stadium, Belgrade, Serbia | 3 – (18', 46', 48') | 1–4 | 2022–23 UEFA Nations League B | |
| 31 | Romelu Lukaku | 24 March 2023 | Belgium | Nationalarenan, Stockholm, Sweden | 3 – (35', 49', 82') | 0–3 | UEFA Euro 2024 qualifying | |
