= AIK–IFK Göteborg rivalry =

Football rivalry in Sweden

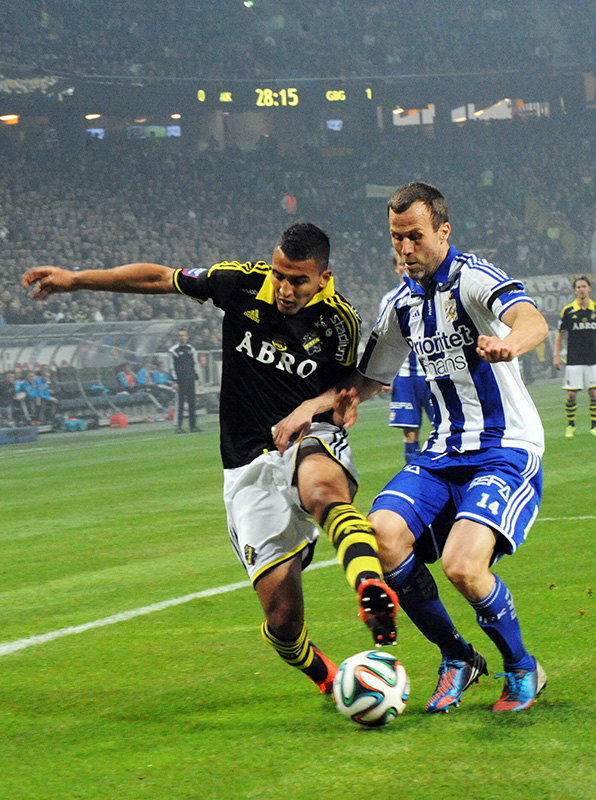
- AIK and IFK Göteborg in the 2014 Allsvenskan
- Location: Stockholm and Gothenburg
- Teams: AIK; IFK Göteborg
- First meeting: 5 May 1910
- Latest meeting: 17 August 2025; IFK Göteborg 2–1 AIK

Statistics
- Total meetings: Competitive: 199
- Most wins: Competitive: IFK Göteborg (97)
- Largest victory: 5 May 1910; AIK 9–1 IFK Göteborg

The fixture between football clubs AIK and IFK Göteborg is a fierce rivalry in Sweden, between the two largest clubs from the two largest cities. The rivalry does not have a unique name, but is sometimes called the "Swedish El Clásico". The two clubs have, besides some Swedish local derbies, the largest rivalry in Swedish football. Fixtures are usually called "hate matches" and gather the largest nationwide interest out of any Swedish club fixtures. Due to the long history in the top division for both clubs, no other rivals in Swedish football have played each other more times (excluding friendly matches).

== Honours ==
As of 1 November 2017

Honour	AIK	IFK Göteborg
Swedish Championship	11	18
Allsvenskan	5	13
Allsvenskan play-offs	0	5
Mästerskapsserien	1	1
Svenska Serien	0	5
Fyrkantserien	0	2
Svenska Cupen	8	7
Svenska Supercupen	1	1
Svenska Mästerskapet	6	3
Wicanderska Välgörenhetsskölden	4	0
UEFA Cup	0	2

== Matches ==
As of 1 November 2017

Competition	Matches	Wins		Draws
Competition	Matches	AIK	IFK Göteborg	Draws
Allsvenskan	163	49	80	34
Mästerskapsserien	4	1	3	0
Allsvenskan play-offs	4	1	1	2
Svenska Serien	16	7	8	1
Fyrkantserien	4	1	3	0
Svenska Cupen	7	3	2	2
Svenska Supercupen	1	1	0	0
Svenska Mästerskapet	1	1	0	0
Total	200	64	97	39

=== League ===
==== AIK at home ====
Date	Venue	Attendance	Score	Competition
5 May 1910	Stockholms IP	3,000	9–1	Svenska Serien
4 June 1911	Råsunda IP	500	3–1	Svenska Serien
20 April 1913	Stockholms stadion	3,000	4–1	Svenska Serien
5 April 1914	Råsunda IP	3,000	1–5	Svenska Serien
4 July 1915	Råsunda IP	2,500	2–0	Svenska Serien
30 April 1916	Råsunda IP	3,422	4–0	Svenska Serien
13 May 1917	Stockholms stadion	–	1–0	Svenska Serien
30 June 1918	Stockholms stadion	4,000	2–5	Fyrkantserien
18 May 1919	Stockholms stadion	9,000	1–0	Fyrkantserien
25 April 1920	Stockholms stadion	10,000	1–0	Svenska Serien
26 October 1924	Stockholms stadion	8,500	3–4	Allsvenskan
13 May 1926	Stockholms stadion	15,450	3–1	Allsvenskan
29 August 1926	Stockholms stadion	8,749	2–3	Allsvenskan
9 October 1927	Stockholms stadion	9,471	2–2	Allsvenskan
21 October 1928	Stockholms stadion	8,942	3–3	Allsvenskan
6 October 1929	Stockholms stadion	19,867	0–3	Allsvenskan
19 October 1930	Stockholms stadion	16,849	3–1	Allsvenskan
1 November 1931	Stockholms stadion	21,315	3–0	Allsvenskan
18 September 1932	Stockholms stadion	10,767	6–1	Allsvenskan
20 August 1933	Stockholms stadion	13,941	2–3	Allsvenskan
28 October 1934	Stockholms stadion	19,742	3–0	Allsvenskan
24 May 1936	Stockholms stadion	16,670	4–0	Allsvenskan
4 October 1936	Stockholms stadion	6,419	3–4	Allsvenskan
22 August 1937	Råsundastadion	18,320	1–1	Allsvenskan
5 November 1939	Råsundastadion	6,835	2–2	Allsvenskan
15 September 1940	Råsundastadion	10,808	3–0	Allsvenskan
28 September 1941	Råsundastadion	11,186	2–3	Allsvenskan
18 April 1943	Råsundastadion	15,386	2–2	Allsvenskan
19 September 1943	Råsundastadion	17,718	4–2	Allsvenskan
22 April 1945	Råsundastadion	13,962	2–7	Allsvenskan
14 October 1945	Råsundastadion	13,752	3–1	Allsvenskan
28 July 1946	Råsundastadion	17,210	4–4	Allsvenskan
6 June 1948	Råsundastadion	16,415	1–4	Allsvenskan
12 September 1948	Råsundastadion	26,352	0–3	Allsvenskan
25 September 1949	Råsundastadion	17,127	2–1	Allsvenskan
25 May 1953	Råsundastadion	11,860	4–0	Allsvenskan
30 August 1953	Råsundastadion	12,868	1–1	Allsvenskan
8 August 1954	Råsundastadion	13,601	5–1	Allsvenskan
3 June 1956	Råsundastadion	13,519	4–0	Allsvenskan
5 June 1957	Råsundastadion	2,201	2–0	Allsvenskan
27 October 1957	Råsundastadion	10,237	1–4	Allsvenskan
13 September 1959	Råsundastadion	12,292	1–1	Allsvenskan
4 September 1960	Råsundastadion	5,447	1–1	Allsvenskan
20 August 1961	Råsundastadion	12,560	2–4	Allsvenskan
12 May 1963	Råsundastadion	15,059	0–2	Allsvenskan
6 September 1964	Råsundastadion	9,751	1–2	Allsvenskan
2 May 1965	Råsundastadion	11,761	0–1	Allsvenskan
18 August 1966	Stockholms stadion	7,410	4–1	Allsvenskan
10 September 1967	Råsundastadion	6,192	0–1	Allsvenskan
8 August 1968	Råsundastadion	7,635	9–3	Allsvenskan
14 September 1969	Råsundastadion	8,994	1–0	Allsvenskan
20 September 1970	Råsundastadion	6,869	0–0	Allsvenskan
11 August 1977	Råsundastadion	16,822	3–6	Allsvenskan
15 April 1978	Råsundastadion	12,980	0–2	Allsvenskan
12 June 1979	Råsundastadion	8,691	1–3	Allsvenskan
8 June 1981	Råsundastadion	8,452	1–1	Allsvenskan
22 August 1982	Råsundastadion	9,712	0–0	Allsvenskan
28 August 1983	Råsundastadion	13,554	1–0	Allsvenskan
26 October 1983	Råsundastadion	16,118	2–0	Allsvenskan play-offs (semi-final)
28 April 1984	Råsundastadion	9,162	0–0	Allsvenskan
13 June 1985	Råsundastadion	6,488	1–1	Allsvenskan
18 June 1986	Råsundastadion	5,839	2–1	Allsvenskan
15 October 1986	Råsundastadion	10,000 (Note: The attendance was not counted due to a labour strike, 10,000 is an estimation.)	0–0	Allsvenskan play-offs (semi-final)
14 May 1987	Råsundastadion	7,004	1–2	Allsvenskan
2 May 1988	Råsundastadion	6,651	1–2	Allsvenskan
15 May 1989	Råsundastadion	6,068	0–0	Allsvenskan
1 October 1990	Råsundastadion	2,539	1–2	Allsvenskan
9 June 1991	Råsundastadion	5,250	0–0	Allsvenskan
27 October 1991	Råsundastadion	2,210	0–2	Mästerskapsserien
24 May 1992	Råsundastadion	5,937	3–0	Allsvenskan
12 September 1992	Råsundastadion	5,472	4–2	Mästerskapsserien
2 August 1993	Råsundastadion	13,847	1–5	Allsvenskan
24 September 1994	Råsundastadion	7,356	0–1	Allsvenskan
21 May 1995	Råsundastadion	4,889	3–1	Allsvenskan
11 August 1996	Råsundastadion	9,457	6–0	Allsvenskan
21 April 1997	Råsundastadion	12,578	0–0	Allsvenskan
10 September 1998	Råsundastadion	14,279	1–0	Allsvenskan
8 June 1999	Råsundastadion	14,304	2–0	Allsvenskan
30 July 2000	Råsundastadion	20,650	0–1	Allsvenskan
25 September 2001	Råsundastadion	15,720	1–1	Allsvenskan
29 July 2002	Råsundastadion	18,472	3–0	Allsvenskan
17 July 2003	Råsundastadion	18,511	0–2	Allsvenskan
15 July 2004	Råsundastadion	12,810	3–1	Allsvenskan
26 October 2006	Råsundastadion	19,153	4–0	Allsvenskan
22 October 2007	Råsundastadion	18,407	0–1	Allsvenskan
13 September 2008	Råsundastadion	12,417	0–0	Allsvenskan
13 July 2009	Råsundastadion	20,174	1–0	Allsvenskan
29 August 2010	Råsundastadion	12,465	1–2	Allsvenskan
21 April 2011	Råsundastadion	17,375	2–0	Allsvenskan
12 April 2012	Råsundastadion	15,702	1–1	Allsvenskan
6 May 2013	Friends Arena	24,211	3–1	Allsvenskan
31 March 2014	Friends Arena	30,650	0–2	Allsvenskan
26 October 2015	Friends Arena	43,713 (Note: Former attendance record for AIK.)	1–2	Allsvenskan
11 April 2016	Friends Arena	19,222	3–3	Allsvenskan
30 October 2017	Friends Arena	19,870	2–1	Allsvenskan
22 April 2018	Friends Arena	19,619	2–0	Allsvenskan

==== IFK Göteborg at home ====
Date	Venue	Attendance	Score	Competition
30 October 1910	Idrottsplatsen	3,000	6–4	Svenska Serien
5 November 1911	Walhalla IP	2,500	5–3	Svenska Serien
1 June 1913	Walhalla IP	3,000	3–0	Svenska Serien
9 November 1913	Walhalla IP	3,000	6–1	Svenska Serien
15 November 1914	Walhalla IP	3,840	4–3	Svenska Serien
21 May 1916	Walhalla IP	5,353	2–2	Svenska Serien
15 April 1917	Gamla Ullevi	3,706	8–1	Svenska Serien
21 April 1918	Gamla Ullevi	5,999	2–0	Fyrkantserien
25 May 1919	Gamla Ullevi	7,000	4–1	Fyrkantserien
5 June 1921	Gamla Ullevi	4,000	3–1	Svenska Serien
24 August 1924	Gamla Ullevi	7,000	1–0	Allsvenskan
18 October 1925	Gamla Ullevi	10,913	3–0	Allsvenskan
10 October 1926	Gamla Ullevi	6,517	2–0	Allsvenskan
3 June 1928	Slottsskogsvallen	4,019	1–1	Allsvenskan
14 October 1928	Gamla Ullevi	9,905	2–1	Allsvenskan
29 May 1930	Gamla Ullevi	13,005	3–1	Allsvenskan
31 May 1931	Slottsskogsvallen	14,531	2–2	Allsvenskan
25 October 1931	Slottsskogsvallen	21,580	2–1	Allsvenskan
25 May 1933	Gamla Ullevi	19,733	3–0	Allsvenskan
13 May 1934	Gamla Ullevi	16,026	3–3	Allsvenskan
21 October 1934	Gamla Ullevi	21,740	1–0	Allsvenskan
13 October 1935	Gamla Ullevi	19,388	1–0	Allsvenskan
25 April 1937	Gamla Ullevi	17,351	0–1	Allsvenskan
5 September 1937	Gamla Ullevi	13,541	1–2	Allsvenskan
20 August 1939	Gamla Ullevi	14,298	3–2	Allsvenskan
14 April 1941	Gamla Ullevi	8,976	2–0	Allsvenskan
10 August 1941	Gamla Ullevi	9,189	3–2	Allsvenskan
13 September 1942	Gamla Ullevi	14,648	1–1	Allsvenskan
23 April 1944	Gamla Ullevi	19,635	1–3	Allsvenskan
1 October 1944	Gamla Ullevi	15,253	2–0	Allsvenskan
22 April 1946	Gamla Ullevi	15,086	1–1	Allsvenskan
18 May 1947	Gamla Ullevi	13,128	1–0	Allsvenskan
12 October 1947	Gamla Ullevi	20,127	1–0	Allsvenskan
27 March 1949	Gamla Ullevi	15,667	3–2	Allsvenskan
21 May 1950	Gamla Ullevi	18,884	4–0	Allsvenskan
17 August 1952	Gamla Ullevi	10,366	5–3	Allsvenskan
11 April 1954	Gamla Ullevi	16,970	1–4	Allsvenskan
5 June 1955	Gamla Ullevi	8,951	5–3	Allsvenskan
10 August 1955	Gamla Ullevi	16,607	2–5	Allsvenskan
29 July 1956	Gamla Ullevi	18,543	0–1	Allsvenskan
11 August 1957	Gamla Ullevi	11,154	3–0	Allsvenskan
3 August 1958	Ullevi	20,581	2–3	Allsvenskan
14 June 1959	Ullevi	15,783	4–0	Allsvenskan
12 June 1960	Ullevi	9,779	1–1	Allsvenskan
22 May 1961	Ullevi	12,981	4–1	Allsvenskan
22 September 1963	Ullevi	13,749	4–0	Allsvenskan
4 June 1964	Ullevi	11,264	1–3	Allsvenskan
10 October 1965	Ullevi	13,058	3–1	Allsvenskan
11 August 1966	Ullevi	11,264	2–1	Allsvenskan
1 May 1967	Ullevi	16,223	2–3	Allsvenskan
19 June 1968	Ullevi	7,506	2–1	Allsvenskan
26 May 1969	Ullevi	15,554	2–0	Allsvenskan
19 April 1970	Ullevi	13,744	0–2	Allsvenskan
19 April 1977	Ullevi	22,279	1–1	Allsvenskan
14 October 1978	Ullevi	8,915	2–1	Allsvenskan
30 August 1979	Ullevi	12,541	3–1	Allsvenskan
13 September 1981	Ullevi	5,157	2–2	Allsvenskan
14 May 1982	Ullevi	5,568	1–0	Allsvenskan
23 May 1983	Ullevi	7,644	3–2	Allsvenskan
23 October 1983	Ullevi	19,693	3–0	Allsvenskan play-offs (semi-final)
12 August 1984	Ullevi	13,122	1–0	Allsvenskan
11 August 1985	Ullevi	9,337	4–0	Allsvenskan
16 July 1986	Ullevi	9,797	2–0	Allsvenskan
18 October 1986	Ullevi	8,823	1–1	Allsvenskan play-offs (semi-final)
5 September 1987	Ullevi	4,056	1–1	Allsvenskan
8 August 1988	Ullevi	6,283	3–1	Allsvenskan
27 August 1989	Ullevi	3,294	4–1	Allsvenskan
16 April 1990	Ullevi	3,528	5–0	Allsvenskan
20 May 1991	Ullevi	3,835	1–0	Allsvenskan
8 September 1991	Ullevi	4,684	1–0	Mästerskapsserien
12 July 1992	Gamla Ullevi	6,600	0–1	Allsvenskan
20 September 1992	Gamla Ullevi	3,708	2–0	Mästerskapsserien
12 April 1993	Gamla Ullevi	9,087	1–1	Allsvenskan
25 April 1994	Gamla Ullevi	10,257	3–1	Allsvenskan
25 September 1995	Gamla Ullevi	7,883	0–0	Allsvenskan
13 June 1996	Gamla Ullevi	5,960	0–1	Allsvenskan
6 October 1997	Gamla Ullevi	7,034	3–0	Allsvenskan
29 June 1998	Gamla Ullevi	6,393	0–1	Allsvenskan
11 September 1999	Gamla Ullevi	10,863	1–0	Allsvenskan
23 July 2000	Gamla Ullevi	10,370	2–2	Allsvenskan
7 May 2001	Gamla Ullevi	12,191	1–0	Allsvenskan
23 September 2002	Gamla Ullevi	8,133	2–0	Allsvenskan
7 July 2003	Gamla Ullevi	16,084	0–2	Allsvenskan
13 September 2004	Gamla Ullevi	10,637	1–0	Allsvenskan
31 July 2006	Gamla Ullevi	13,124	1–1	Allsvenskan
17 April 2007	Ullevi	18,162	1–2	Allsvenskan
21 April 2008	Ullevi	9,679	2–0	Allsvenskan
1 November 2009	Gamla Ullevi	17,233	1–2	Allsvenskan
6 May 2010	Gamla Ullevi	12,020	4–0	Allsvenskan
4 August 2011	Gamla Ullevi	13,918	3–1	Allsvenskan
21 October 2012	Gamla Ullevi	10,727	0–1	Allsvenskan
23 September 2013	Gamla Ullevi	16,206	3–1	Allsvenskan
4 August 2014	Gamla Ullevi	14,547	0–2	Allsvenskan
21 May 2015	Gamla Ullevi	14,682	3–0	Allsvenskan
24 October 2016	Gamla Ullevi	13,132	1–0	Allsvenskan
10 August 2017 (Note: The match was originally scheduled to be played on 18 May 2017.)	Gamla Ullevi	16,187	2–1	Allsvenskan

=== Cup ===
Date	Venue	Attendance	Matches			Competition
Date	Venue	Attendance	Team 1	Score	Team 2	Competition
26 September 1979	Ullevi	2,221	IFK Göteborg	4–1	AIK	Svenska Cupen (round 6)
10 April 1983	Råsundastadion	4,079	AIK	0–3	IFK Göteborg	Svenska Cupen (quarter-final)
2 November 1991	Råsundastadion (Note: Råsundastadion was designated a neutral venue for the cup final.)	2,151	AIK	2–2 (2–3 agg)	IFK Göteborg	Svenska Cupen (final)
4 May 1995	Råsundastadion	5,751	AIK	1–0	IFK Göteborg	Svenska Cupen (semi-final)
14 May 1999	Råsundastadion	9,151	AIK	1–0	IFK Göteborg	Svenska Cupen (final)
20 May 1999	Ullevi	13,853	IFK Göteborg	0–0	AIK	Svenska Cupen (final)
7 November 2009	Råsundastadion	24,365	AIK	2–0	IFK Göteborg	Svenska Cupen (final)
8 March 2010	Råsundastadion	2,537	AIK	1–0	IFK Göteborg	Svenska Supercupen (final)

=== Other competitions ===
Date	Venue	Attendance	Matches			Competition
Date	Venue	Attendance	Team 1	Score	Team 2	Competition
24 September 1916	Råsunda IP	5,000	AIK	2–1	IFK Göteborg	Svenska Mästerskapet (semi-final)

== Records ==
As of 1 November 2017

=== Biggest wins ===
Margin	Match			Date	Competition
Margin	Team 1	Score	Team 2	Date	Competition
8	AIK	9–1	IFK Göteborg	5 May 1910	Svenska Serien
7	IFK Göteborg	8–1	AIK	15 April 1917	Svenska Serien
6	AIK	9–3	IFK Göteborg	8 August 1968	Allsvenskan
6	AIK	6–0	IFK Göteborg	11 August 1996	Allsvenskan
5	IFK Göteborg	6–1	AIK	9 November 1913	Svenska Serien
5	AIK	6–1	IFK Göteborg	18 September 1932	Allsvenskan
5	AIK	2–7	IFK Göteborg	22 April 1945	Allsvenskan
5	IFK Göteborg	5–0	AIK	16 April 1990	Allsvenskan
4	AIK	1–5	IFK Göteborg	5 April 1914	Svenska Serien
4	AIK	4–0	IFK Göteborg	30 April 1916	Svenska Serien
4	AIK	4–0	IFK Göteborg	24 May 1936	Allsvenskan
4	IFK Göteborg	4–0	AIK	21 May 1950	Allsvenskan
4	AIK	4–0	IFK Göteborg	25 May 1953	Allsvenskan
4	AIK	5–1	IFK Göteborg	8 August 1954	Allsvenskan
4	AIK	4–0	IFK Göteborg	3 June 1956	Allsvenskan
4	IFK Göteborg	4–0	AIK	14 June 1959	Allsvenskan
4	IFK Göteborg	4–0	AIK	22 September 1963	Allsvenskan
4	IFK Göteborg	4–0	AIK	11 August 1985	Allsvenskan
4	AIK	1–5	IFK Göteborg	2 August 1993	Allsvenskan
4	AIK	4–0	IFK Göteborg	26 October 2006	Allsvenskan
4	IFK Göteborg	4–0	AIK	6 May 2010	Allsvenskan

=== Highest scoring matches ===
Goals	Match			Date	Competition
Goals	Team 1	Score	Team 2	Date	Competition
12	AIK	9–3	IFK Göteborg	8 August 1968	Allsvenskan
10	AIK	9–1	IFK Göteborg	5 May 1910	Svenska Serien
10	IFK Göteborg	6–4	AIK	30 October 1910	Svenska Serien
9	IFK Göteborg	8–1	AIK	15 April 1917	Svenska Serien
9	AIK	2–7	IFK Göteborg	22 April 1945	Allsvenskan
9	AIK	3–6	IFK Göteborg	11 August 1977	Allsvenskan
8	IFK Göteborg	5–3	AIK	5 November 1911	Svenska Serien
8	AIK	4–4	IFK Göteborg	28 July 1946	Allsvenskan
8	IFK Göteborg	5–3	AIK	17 August 1952	Allsvenskan
8	IFK Göteborg	5–3	AIK	5 June 1955	Allsvenskan

=== Highest attendances ===
Attendance	Date	Venue	Home team	Competition
43,713	26 October 2015	Friends Arena	AIK	Allsvenskan
30,650	31 March 2014	Friends Arena	AIK	Allsvenskan
26,352	12 September 1948	Råsundastadion	AIK	Allsvenskan
24,365	7 November 2009	Råsundastadion	AIK	Svenska Cupen (final)
24,211	6 May 2013	Friends Arena	AIK	Allsvenskan
21,740	21 October 1934	Gamla Ullevi	IFK Göteborg	Allsvenskan
21,580	25 October 1931	Slottsskogsvallen	IFK Göteborg	Allsvenskan
21,315	1 November 1931	Stockholms stadion	AIK	Allsvenskan
20,650	30 July 2000	Råsundastadion	AIK	Allsvenskan
20,581	3 August 1958	Ullevi	IFK Göteborg	Allsvenskan

== Shared player history ==
=== Managed both ===
Manager	Managed		Managed	
Manager	Team	Span	Team	Span
Mikael Stahre	AIK	2009–2010	IFK Göteborg	2012–2014
