= 1920 Svenska Mästerskapet =

Tournament details
- Country: Sweden

Final positions
- Champions: Djurgårdens IF
- Runners-up: IK Sleipner

The 1920 Svenska Mästerskapet was the 25th season of Svenska Mästerskapet, the football cup to determine the Swedish champions. Djurgårdens IF won the tournament by defeating IK Sleipner in the final with a 1–0 score.

== Qualifying rounds ==
=== First qualifying round ===
| Team 1 | Score | Team 2 |
|---|---|---|
| Järva IS | 3–2 | IF Olympia |
| IK Wega | 2–2 | IK Virgo |
| Stockholms BK | 4–0 | Värtans IK |
| IFK Västerås | 0–3 | Västerås IK |
| IF Vesta | 3–1 | Upsala IF |
| Jönköpings IS | 1–2 | Husqvarna IF |
Replays
| IK Virgo | 3–2 | IK Wega |

=== Second qualifying round ===
| Team 1 | Score | Team 2 |
|---|---|---|
| Westermalms IF | 2–3 | Stockholms BK |
| Tranebergs IF | 2–7 | IF Linnéa |
| AIK | 3–0 | IFK Stockholm |
| Gefle IF | 0–0 | Skutskärs IF |
| IF Elfsborg | 1–3 | Fässbergs IF |
| Örgryte IS | 4–0 | IS Halmia |
| Landskrona BoIS | 3–2 | Malmö FF |
| IFK Helsingborg | 2–0 | IFK Hässleholm |
| Kalmar IS | 4–1 | Husqvarna IF |
| Örebro SK | 3–0 | Västerås IK |
| Tunafors SK | 4–2 | IFK Arboga |
| Köpings IS | 6–0 | IF Verdandi |
| IF Vesta | 0–4 | IK Sirius |
| Järva IS | 1–3 | Hammarby IF |
| IK Wega | 0–3 | IFK Göteborg |
Replays
| Skutskärs IF | 3–1 | Gefle IF |

=== Third qualifying round ===
| Team 1 | Score | Team 2 |
|---|---|---|
| AIK | 6–1 | Hammarby IF |
| Örebro SK | 1–1 | Fässbergs IF |
| IK Sleipner | 3–1 | Kalmar IS |
| Köpings IS | 3–1 | Tunafors SK |
| Skutskärs IF | 1–3 | IK Sirius |
| IF Linnéa | 3–1 | Stockholms BK |
| IFK Helsingborg | 1–1 | Landskrona BoIS |
| IFK Göteborg | 1–1 | Örgryte IS |
Replays
| Fässbergs IF | 1–2 | Örebro SK |
| Landskrona BoIS | 1–9 | IFK Helsingborg |
| Örgryte IS | 0–2 | IFK Göteborg |

== Main tournament ==
=== Preliminary round ===
| Team 1 | Score | Team 2 |
|---|---|---|
| IFK Eskilstuna | 8–0 | Köpings IS |
| Sandvikens AIK | 2–0 | IK Sirius |
| IFK Norrköping | 0–4 | IK Sleipner |
| Djurgårdens IF | 5–1 | Mariebergs IK |
| Hälsingborgs IF | 0–0 | IFK Helsingborg |
| Örebro SK | 0–2 | IFK Uddevalla |
| AIK | 5–0 | IF Linnéa |
| IFK Göteborg | 2–1 | GAIS |
Replays
| IFK Helsingborg | 0–0 (a.e.t.) | Hälsingborgs IF |
| Hälsingborgs IF | 2–1 | IFK Helsingborg |

=== Quarter-finals ===
| Team 1 | Score | Team 2 |
|---|---|---|
| Hälsingborgs IF | 1–2 | Djurgårdens IF |
| IFK Uddevalla | 4–1 | IFK Eskilstuna |
| IFK Göteborg | 2–0 | Sandvikens AIK |
| AIK | 1–1 | IK Sleipner |
Replays
| IK Sleipner | 5–2 | AIK |

=== Semi-finals ===
| Team 1 | Score | Team 2 |
|---|---|---|
| Djurgårdens IF | 1–0 | IFK Göteborg |
| IK Sleipner | 2–0 | IFK Uddevalla |

=== Final ===
24 October 1920

| Djurgårdens IF | 1–0 | IK Sleipner |
|---|---|---|
| Sundberg 30' (pen.) |

Stockholm Olympic Stadium, Stockholm
Attendance: 8,000
Referee: David Andersson, Gothenburg
