= Torsten Husén =

Swedish educator (1916–2009)

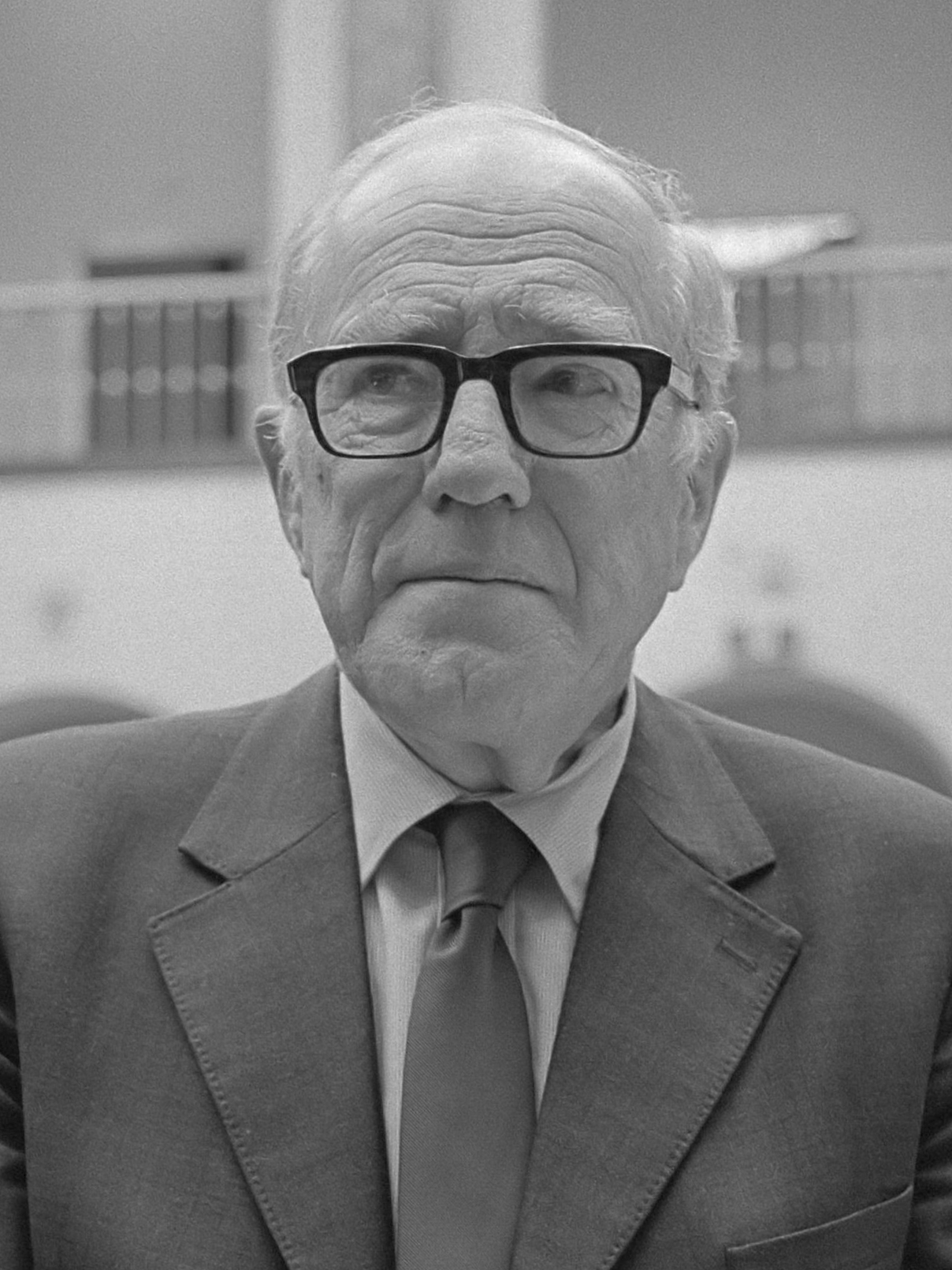
Torsten Husén (1982)

Torsten Husén (1 March 1916 in Lund – 2 July 2009) was a Swedish educator. Husén became Master of Arts in 1938, was an assistant at the Department of Psychology at Lund University from 1938 to 1943, became Doctor of Philosophy in Lund in 1944, and associate professor of education at Stockholm University in 1947. He was professor of education and educational psychology at Stockholm University 1953–1955, 1956–1971 in practical pedagogy at Stockholm Institute of Education and in education at Stockholm University from 1971 to 1981.

Husén was a pioneer in the field of military psychology in Sweden during the 1940s. In 1941 he published the book Militär psykologi (Military Psychology) and Psykologisk krigföring in 1942 (Psychological Warfare). He was a psychology expert at the army headquarter 1942–1944, became a military psychologist in 1944, was assistant professor of psychology at the Central Conscription Agency from 1948 to 1953 and lecturer at the Military Academy from 1949 to 1953. He was also a lecturer at the Social Institute (Socialhögskolan) in Stockholm 1950–1954.

Husén participated in the preparations for the implementation of the Swedish compulsory school system, and was a prolific author. He went on several foreign missions, not least for his research in the 1960s focused on comparison of school results in different countries.

Husén became a member of the Royal Swedish Academy of War Sciences in 1956, the Royal Swedish Academy of Sciences in 1972, the Finnish Academy of Sciences in 1973 and the Polish Academy of Sciences 1977. He was awarded an honorary doctorate from the University of Chicago in 1967.
