= Ragnar Gunnarsson =

Swedish footballer (1891–1967)

Ragnar Gunarsson
Personal information
- Date of birth: 7 December 1891
- Place of birth: Stockholm, Sweden
- Date of death: 13 March 1967 (aged 75)
- Place of death: Stockholm, Sweden
- Position: Forward

Senior career*
| Years | Team | Apps | (Gls) |
| 1910–1915 | Klara SK | | |
| 1915–1918 | Hammarby IF | | |

International career
| 1916 | Sweden | 1 | (0) |
- * Club domestic league appearances and goals

Ragnar Gunnarsson (7 December 1891 – 13 March 1967) was a Swedish footballer who played as a forward, known for scoring the first goal in Hammarby IF's history in 1915. He won one cap for the Sweden men's national football team.

== Athletic career ==
=== Football ===
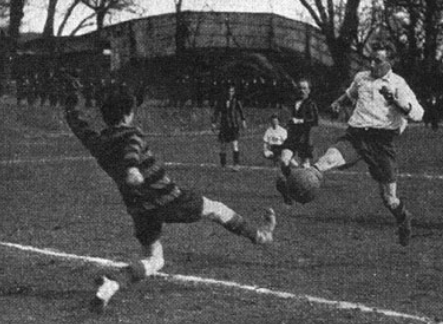
Gunnarsson (right) scoring for Hammarby IF in a game against Johanneshofs IF on 6 May 1917.

On 15 August 1915, Gunnarsson scored the first ever competitive goal in Hammarby IF's history, in a 5–0 home win against Västerås SK. Earlier the same year, it had merged with local club Klara SK, where Gunnarsson had started his career.

During the first seasons, Hammarby failed to reach the later stages of Svenska Mästerskapet, a cup by then held to decide the Swedish Champions. Known as a prolific goalscorer, Gunnarsson was one of the club's early key players together with goalkeeper Victor Olsson and defender Gösta Wihlborg.

He won one cap for the Swedish football team, on 1 October 1916, playing the whole game in a 0–0 draw against Norway. Gunnarsson left Hammarby at the end of 1918.

=== Bandy ===
Like many other footballers at the time, Gunnarsson also played bandy with Hammarby IF between 1915 and 1918.

== Works cited ==
- Persson, Gunnar (1996). Hammarby IF: En klubbhistoria 1897–1997 (in Swedish). Strömbergs Bokförlag. ISBN 91-7151-097-4.
