= Wim Gupffert =

Dutch footballer (1894–1958)

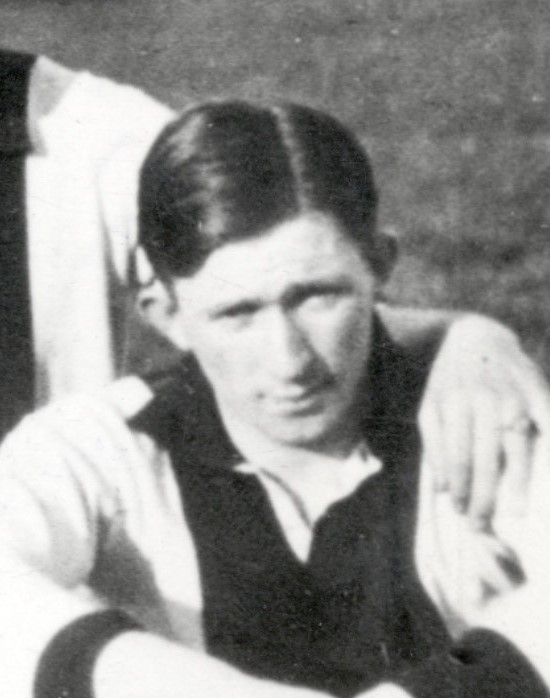
- Wim Gupffert in 1917

Personal information
- Full name: Willem Hendrikus Antonius Gupffert
- Date of birth: 18 October 1894
- Place of birth: Amsterdam, Netherlands
- Date of death: 27 December 1958 (aged 64)
- Place of death: Amsterdam, Netherlands
- Height: 1.71 m (5 ft 7 1/2 in)
- Position: Left winger

Senior career*
Years	Team	Apps	(Gls)
19??–1914	RCA Amsterdam		
1914–1915	Blauw-Wit		
1915–1921	Ajax	126	(62)

International career
1919–1921	Netherlands	3	(2)
- * Club domestic league appearances and goals

Wim Gupffert (18 October 1894 – 27 December 1958) was a Dutch footballer. He was part of the Netherlands national football team, playing 3 matches and scoring 2 goals. He played his first match on 9 June 1919, a friendly match against Sweden where he scored one goal. Two other Ajax players debuted in this match as well, namely Theo Brokmann and Henk Hordijk. On club level he played for Blauw-Wit and Ajax. He scored 3 goals in 5 matches during the 1916-17 KNVB Cup.

== Personal life ==
Wim was born in Amsterdam, the son of Johan Gupffert and Johanna Jacomina Melchers. He was married to Aaltje Visser.

== Career statistics ==
Club	Season	League		KNVB Cup		Total	
Club	Season	Apps	Goals	Apps	Goals	Apps	Goals
Ajax	1915–16	17	11	—		17	11
Ajax	1916–17	17	8	5	3	22	11
Ajax	1917–18	28	14	0	0	28	14
Ajax	1918–19	24	11	—		24	11
Ajax	1919–20	11	5	—		11	5
Ajax	1920–21	28	13	0	0	28	13
Ajax	1921–22	1	0	—		1	0
Total		126	62	5	3	131	65

== Sources ==
- Vermeer, Evert; van Hoof, Marcelle (1999). Ajax 100 Jaar Jubileumboek 1900-2000 (in Dutch). Amsterdam: Luitingh-Sijthoff. ISBN 90-245-3497-6.

== See also ==
- List of Dutch international footballers
