= Fyrkantserien =

- Organising body: Private (IFK Göteborg, Örgryte IS, AIK and Djurgårdens IF)
- Founded: 24 March 1918; 108 years ago
- First season: 1918
- Folded: 1919
- Country: Sweden
- Number of clubs: 4
- Last champions: IFK Göteborg (1918 or 1919 (Note: Sources treat the unfinished 1919 league season differently in terms of naming a winner or not. See the "History" section.))
- Most championships: IFK Göteborg (1 or 2 titles)

Fyrkantserien was an interim and privately run association football league in Sweden played in 1918 and 1919 when the national league Svenska Serien was not played due to various circumstances. The league featured four teams, two from Stockholm—AIK and Djurgårdens IF—and two from Gothenburg—IFK Göteborg and Örgryte IS.

== History ==
A national league in Sweden had existed since 1910 as Svenska Serien, sanctioned from the start by the Swedish Football Association, but not organised by the football association for the first two seasons. The 1912–13 Svenska Serien season start marked the first occasion of an officially organised national league. League play continued during the first years of World War I, but at a board meeting of the football association in September 1917 it was decided to cancel the 1917–18 season, due to multiple factors. Even though Sweden was neutral during the war, food shortages were commonplace, travel costs had risen markedly, and night trains were cancelled, complicating league play both financially and logistically. The association tried to restart league play in early 1918, but on 28 April the board took a decision to not arrange any leagues at all during the year.

The four leading clubs from Gothenburg and Stockholm—IFK Göteborg, Örgryte IS, AIK and Djurgårdens IF—who also participated in the 1916–17 Svenska Serien season met in Stockholm on 23/24 March 1918. They decided to continue league play privately on their own initiative, organised without involvement by the Swedish Football Association. A trophy—named Sydowska Pokalen or Von Sydows Pokal—was donated by Oscar von Sydow, the governor of Gothenburg and Bohus County. The clubs agreed to arrange the four-team league "to the extent that the conditions allow". Train travel between the two cities was still relatively well-functioning which simplified matters.

The first season kicked off in April 1918 and continued play through the year, with the last matches played in November. IFK Göteborg continued to dominate in domestic play—they had won Svenska Serien the previous five seasons—and were undefeated throughout the season, winning 5 out of 6 matches while also simultaneously winning the Swedish championship (Note: At the time, the title of "Swedish champions" was awarded to the winner of Svenska Mästerskapet, a stand-alone cup tournament.). The 1919 version once again kicked off without any official league being arranged by the football association. This time, the Spanish flu and financial issues caused three matches to be left unplayed, despite an attempt to restart league play late in the year. While the Swedish Football Association 100 year anniversary book lists a winning IFK Göteborg team for 1919 in the second volume, and mentions IFK Göteborg winning seven league titles (1913–1919) in a row in the first volume despite the unfinished league, the official IFK Göteborg 50 year anniversary book only lists the 1918 title and no title for 1919 in its statistics.

On 25 April 1920, national league play under football association supervision after the two-year interruption restarted in the form of Svenska Serien once again. To reduce the risk taken by the association, the financial risk—and potential reward—was assumed by the participating clubs rather than by the organiser.

== Names ==
As an interim league arranged privately without sanction from the football association, the competition has been described by several different names. The official Swedish Football Association 100 year anniversary book lists the competition by the name Fyrkantserien ("the Square league") in the second volume detailing the competition and results, but includes the competition as part of Svenska Serien in a mention in the first volume. The slightly different spelling Fyrkantsserien with an interfix -s- is used by some other sources, and further names listed include Fyrväpplingstävlingen ("the Four-leaf clover competition") or Fyrväpplingsserien, Serien "Stockholm–Göteborg", Svenska Serien (Stockholm–Göteborg), and in a matchday programme from 1919 the league is mentioned as Serien "Göteborg–Stockholm". The Gothenburg newspaper Göteborgs-Tidningen mockingly named it Surrogatserien ("the Surrogate league").

== Previous winners ==
Season	Winners	Runners-up
1918	IFK Göteborg (1)	Örgryte IS
1919	IFK Göteborg (2)	Örgryte IS

== League champions ==
Titles	Club
2	IFK Göteborg
