= Frithiof Rudén =

Swedish footballer

Personal information
- Date of birth: 12 March 1897
- Date of death: 10 March 1972 (aged 74)
- Position: Goalkeeper

Senior career*
Years	Team	Apps	(Gls)
- Djurgården

International career
1916–1922	Sweden	5	(0)
- * Club domestic league appearances and goals

Frithiof Rudén (12 March 1897 – 10 March 1972) was a Swedish football goalkeeper. Rudén was part of the Djurgården Swedish champions' team of 1917 and 1920.

Rudén debuted for the Sweden in a 1916 friendly against United States, which Sweden lost 2–3. In the 1919 friendly against Finland, he played together with fellow Djurgården teammates Ragnar Wicksell, Einar Hemming, Sten Söderberg, and Carl Karlstrand, and delivered a clean sheet in the 1–0 win. In total, Rudén made 5 appearances for the national team and scored 0 goals.

== Honours ==
=== Club ===
Djurgårdens IF

- Svenska Mästerskapet (2): 1917, 1920
