= Einar Halling-Johansson =

Swedish footballer

Einar Halling-Johansson, 1917

Einar Alexius Halling-Johansson (October 14, 1893 - February 4, 1958) was a Swedish amateur football (soccer) player who competed in the 1912 Summer Olympics, as well as in the 1920 Summer Olympics as a reserve player.

He was a member of the Swedish Olympic squad. He did not play in a match, but was a reserve player.
