= Herbert Carlsson =

Swedish footballer

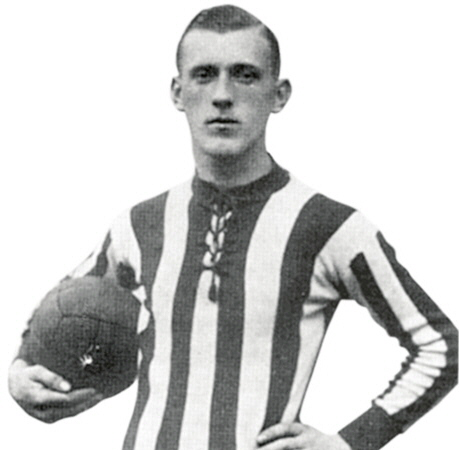

Personal information
- Full name: Knut Herbert Karlsson
- Date of birth: August 9, 1896
- Place of birth: Gothenburg, Sweden
- Date of death: October 12, 1952 (aged 56)
- Place of death: Gothenburg, Sweden
- Position: Inside forward

Senior career*
Years	Team	Apps	(Gls)
- Annedals FF
- IK Niord
- IK Vega
1917–1922	IFK Göteborg	28	(29)
1922–1924	New York Vikings		
1924–1927	Indiana Flooring	110	(56)
1927–1930	New York Nationals	109	(31)
1930–1931	New York Giants	49	(20)

International career
1918–1922	Sweden	20	(19)
- * Club domestic league appearances and goals

Knut Herbert "Murren" Karlsson (8 September 1896 – 21 October 1952), better known as Herbert Carlsson, was a Swedish footballer who played as an inside forward. He played professionally in both Sweden and the United States. He also earned twenty caps, scoring nineteen goals, with the Sweden national team between 1918 and 1922. He represented his country at the 1920 Summer Olympics where he was the tournament top scorer.

== Club career ==
After starting his career playing for three local clubs, he joined IFK Göteborg in 1917 and won a Swedish Championship with the club the year after. He became the club's first big star. He emigrated to United States in 1922 where he played in for the New York Vikings in the New York State League. In 1924, he signed with Indiana Flooring in the American Soccer League. In 1927, he toured with the Vikings of Scandinavia. When he returned to the United States, he found that his team had been sold to Charles Stoneham and renamed the New York Nationals. In 1930, Stoneham renamed the team the New York Giants. Carlsson left the Giants and the ASL following the 1931 fall season. He returned to Sweden in 1936 to end his career when he died in 1952.

== International career ==
Carlsson earned twenty caps, scoring nineteen goals, for Sweden. In 1920, he played for the Swedish soccer team at the 1920 Summer Olympics. He led the team in scoring with nine goals.

== Career statistics ==
=== Club ===
Appearances and goals by club, season and competition
Club	Season	League			National Cup		Total	
Club	Season	Division	Apps	Goals	Apps	Goals	Apps	Goals
IFK Göteborg	1917	Triangelserien	0	0	4	2	4	2
IFK Göteborg	1918	Fyrkantserien	5	4	3	4	8	8
IFK Göteborg	1919	Fyrkantserien	5	4	1	0	6	4
IFK Göteborg	1920-21	Swedish Series	12	19	8	6	20	25
IFK Göteborg	1921-22	Swedish Series	0	0	1	0	1	0
IFK Göteborg	1922-23	Swedish Series	6	2	2	1	8	3
IFK Göteborg	Total		28	29	19	13	47	46
Indiana Flooring	1924-25	ASL	40	24	0	0	40	24
Indiana Flooring	1925-26	ASL	36	19	0	0	36	19
Indiana Flooring	1926-27	ASL	34	13	0	0	34	13
Indiana Flooring	Total		110	56	0	0	110	56
New York Nationals	1927-28	ASL	13	2	0	0	13	2
New York Nationals	1928-29	ASL	45	18	0	0	45	18
New York Nationals	1929	ASL	20	4	0	0	20	4
New York Nationals	1930	ACSL	31	7	0	0	31	7
New York Nationals	Total		109	31	0	0	109	31
New York Giants	1930	ASL	15	10	0	0	15	10
New York Giants	1931	ASL	34	10	0	0	34	10
New York Giants	Total		49	20	0	0	49	25
Career total			296	136	19	13	315	151

=== International ===
Appearances and goals by national team and year
National team	Year	Apps	Goals
Sweden	1918	2	0
Sweden	1919	6	8
Sweden	1920	5	8
Sweden	1921	4	3
Sweden	1922	3	0
Total		20	19

== Honours ==
IFK Göteborg

- Swedish Champion: 1918

New York Giants

- American Soccer League: 1931

New York Nationals

- National Challence Cup: 1928
- Lewis Cup: 1929

Individual

- Summer Olympics top scorer: 1920
- Stor Grabb: 1926
