= Valdus Lund =

Swedish footballer (1895–1962)

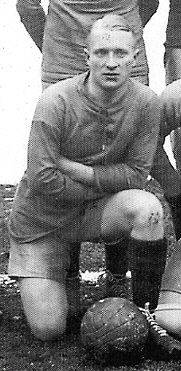
- Valdus Lund in 1915

Personal information
- Full name: Manne Valdus Lund
- Date of birth: 4 April 1895
- Place of birth: Gothenburg, Sweden
- Date of death: 9 May 1962 (aged 67)
- Place of death: Gothenburg, Sweden
- Position: Defender

Youth career
- –1911: IFK Göteborg

Senior career*
Years	Team	Apps	(Gls)
1912–1928	IFK Göteborg	144	(1)

International career
1915–1923	Sweden	29	(0)
- * Club domestic league appearances and goals

Manne Valdus Lund (4 April 1895 – 9 May 1962) was a Swedish footballer who played as a defender. He represented IFK Göteborg between 1912 and 1928, playing in a total of 341 games in all competitions. He won a total of 29 caps for the Sweden national team between 1915 and 1923 and competed in the men's tournament at the 1920 Summer Olympics.

== Career statistics ==
=== International ===
Appearances and goals by national team and year
National team	Year	Apps	Goals
Sweden	1915	2	0
Sweden	1916	2	0
Sweden	1917	2	0
Sweden	1918	3	0
Sweden	1919	2	0
Sweden	1920	4	0
Sweden	1921	0	0
Sweden	1922	7	0
Sweden	1923	7	0
Total		29	0

== Honours ==
IFK Göteborg

- Swedish Championship: 1918

Individual

- Stor Grabb: 1926
