= IK Virgo =

- Full name: Idrottsklubben Virgo
- Founded: 17 June 1909
- Ground: Mossens IP, Gothenburg

Idrottsklubben Virgo is a Swedish association football club from Gothenburg.

The club was founded on 17 June 1909 as Örgryte BK. Following a protest from Örgryte IS, the name was changed to IK Virgo since the foundation happened in Café Virgo. The club was successful during the late 1910s and 1920s, with 9 players featuring internationally for Sweden. The club colours were the same as AC Milan.

The men's football team plays in the Division 4B as per 2021. The women's football team plays in Division 4.
