= Gustaf Carlson (footballer) =

Swedish footballer (1894–1942)

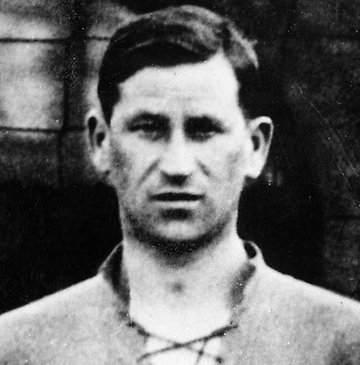
- Carlson in the 1920s

Personal information
- Date of birth: 22 July 1894
- Place of birth: Stockholm, Sweden
- Date of death: 12 August 1942 (aged 48)
- Position: Defender

Senior career*
Years	Team	Apps	(Gls)
1914–1925	Mariebergs IK		

International career
1915–1924	Sweden	13	(0)
Medal record
Olympic medal record
Men's Football
Bronze medal – third place	1924 Paris	Team competition
- * Club domestic league appearances and goals

Gustaf Johannes Carlson (22 July 1894 – 12 August 1942) was a Swedish footballer who competed in the 1924 Summer Olympics. A defender, he was a member of the Swedish team which won the bronze medal in the football tournament.
