= Mauritz Sandberg =

Swedish footballer

- Sandberg at the 1920 Olympics

Personal information
- Date of birth: 15 November 1895
- Place of birth: Munkedal, Sweden
- Date of death: 4 November 1981 (aged 85)
- Place of death: Stenungsund, Sweden

International career
Years	Team	Apps	(Gls)
- Sweden

Mauritz Sandberg (15 November 1895 – 4 November 1981) was a Swedish footballer. He competed in the men's tournament at the 1920 Summer Olympics.
