= Caleb Schylander =

Swedish footballer

Personal information
- Date of birth: June 2, 1895
- Place of birth: Sweden
- Date of death: August 4, 1977
- Place of death: Florida
- Position: Inside forward

Senior career*
Years	Team	Apps	(Gls)
1913–1923	IFK Göteborg	329	
1924–1927	Indiana Flooring	96	(24)

International career
1915–1918	Sweden	7	
- * Club domestic league appearances and goals

Caleb "Kairo" Schylander (1895–1977) was a Swedish association football inside forward who earned seven caps with the Sweden men's national football team. He played professionally in Sweden and the United States player.

In 1913, Schylander began his career with IFK Göteborg. In 1924, he moved to the United States where he signed with Indiana Flooring of the American Soccer League. In his first season (1924–25), he scored thirteen goals in forty-three games. By his third and final season with Indiana, both his appearances and goalscoring had fallen to sixteen games and two goals.

Schylander earned seven caps with the Sweden men's national football team between 1915 and 1918.
