= Konrad Törnqvist =

Swedish footballer

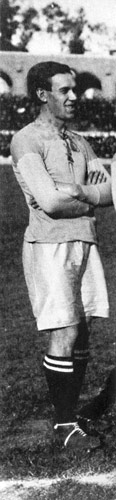
- Törnqvist in 2013

Personal information
- Full name: Konrad Emanuel Törnqvist
- Date of birth: 17 July 1888
- Place of birth: Falköping, Sweden
- Date of death: 12 July 1952 (aged 63)
- Position: Defender

Senior career*
Years	Team	Apps	(Gls)
1907–1924	IFK Göteborg		

International career
1909–1919	Sweden	13	(2)
- * Club domestic league appearances and goals

Konrad Emanuel Törnqvist (17 July 1888 – 12 July 1952) was a Swedish footballer who competed at the 1912 Summer Olympics. He was a member of the Swedish Olympic squad in 1912. A defender, he played one match in the consolation tournament.
