= Rune Bergström =

Swedish footballer (1891–1964)

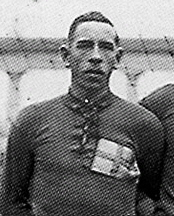
Rune Bergström (1920)

Karl Rune Valerius Bergström (September 5, 1891 – May 7, 1964) was a Swedish football player who competed in the 1920 Summer Olympics. In the 1920 tournament he was a part of the Swedish football team that finished in 5th place. He won a total of 26 caps and scored five goals for the Sweden national team.
