= Henning Svensson =

Swedish footballer (1891–1979)

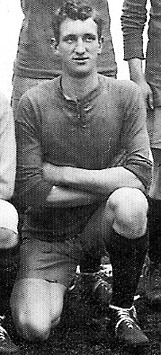
- Svensson in 1915

Personal information
- Date of birth: 19 October 1891
- Place of birth: Sweden
- Date of death: 23 January 1979 (aged 87)
- Position: Defender

Senior career*
Years	Team	Apps	(Gls)
- IFK Göteborg

International career
1912–1923	Sweden	20	(0)

Managerial career
- 1924–1929: IFK Göteborg
- 1931–1932: IFK Göteborg
- 1932–1933: Falkenbergs FF
- 1943: IFK Göteborg
- * Club domestic league appearances and goals

Henning Svensson (born 19 October 1891 – 23 January 1979) was a Swedish amateur football defender who competed in the 1912 Summer Olympics. He was a member of the Swedish Olympic squad. He did not play in a match, but was a reserve player.

He played a total of 20 full international games for Sweden. He represented his country from 1912 to 1923.

He played his club football for IFK Göteborg. He managed IFK Göteborg and Falkenbergs FF.
