= Erik Hjelm =

Swedish footballer

Personal information
- Date of birth: 22 May 1893
- Place of birth: Alingsås, Sweden
- Date of death: 30 June 1975 (aged 82)

International career
Years	Team	Apps	(Gls)
1913–1923	Sweden	19	(2)

Erik Hjelm (22 May 1893 – 30 June 1975) was a Swedish footballer. He played in 19 matches for the Sweden men's national football team from 1913 to 1923. He was also part of Sweden's squad for the football tournament at the 1920 Summer Olympics, but he did not play in any matches.
