= Erik Börjesson =

Swedish footballer and manager

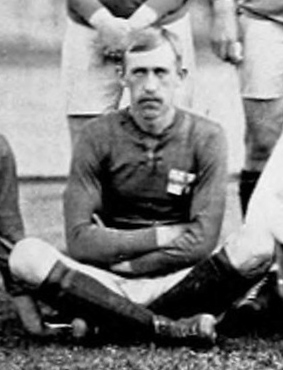
- Börjesson in 1912

Personal information
- Date of birth: 1 December 1886
- Place of birth: Jonsered, Sweden
- Date of death: 17 July 1983 (aged 96)
- Place of death: Partille, Sweden

International career
Years	Team	Apps	(Gls)
1908–1922	Sweden	17	(14)

Erik Oskar "Börje" Börjesson (1 December 1886 – 17 July 1983) was a Swedish football striker in the early 20th century.

He was born in Jonsered, outside Gothenburg. After starting his career playing for the local club Jonsereds GIF, he joined IFK Göteborg in 1907. His outstanding technique and good shooting skills made him the most important player in the team, which often stood and fell with him. Between 1910 and 1912, Börjesson played for Örgryte IS but then he returned to IFK Göteborg. After a friendly between IFK Göteborg and the English team Liverpool in 1914, he was offered a pro contract with the English club, which he declined. He continued playing for IFK Göteborg until 1920 when he retired. He made a short comeback in 1923 and was active for two years as playing manager in Örgryte IS. He had 17 caps for the Sweden national team, scoring 14 goals.

Börjesson was a member of the Swedish Olympic squad in 1912. He played as forward one match in the main tournament as well as one match in the consolation tournament. In the main tournament he scored one goal.

== Clubs ==
- Jonsereds GIF (–1907)
- IFK Göteborg (1907–1910, 1912–1920)
- Örgryte IS (1910–1912, 1923–1925)
