= Theodor Malm =

Swedish footballer and bandy player (1889–1950)

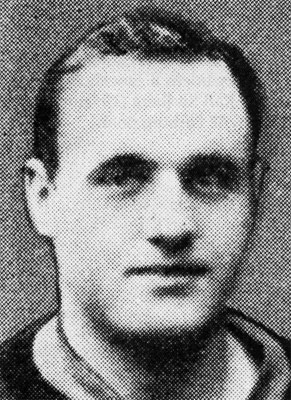
- Malm in 1916

Personal information
- Full name: Bror Theodor Malm
- Date of birth: 23 October 1889
- Place of birth: Stockholm, Sweden
- Date of death: 2 October 1950 (aged 60)
- Position: Right-back

Senior career*
Years	Team	Apps	(Gls)
1905–1921	AIK		

International career
1908–1920	Sweden	23	(0)
- * Club domestic league appearances and goals

Theodor "Todde" Malm (23 October 1889 – 2 October 1950) was a Swedish amateur footballer and bandy player. He competed in the 1908 Summer Olympics and in the 1912 Summer Olympics. In the 1908 tournament he was a part of the Swedish football team and played in the only match for Sweden. Four years later he was a member of the Swedish Olympic squad. He did not play in a match, but was a reserve player.
