= Helge Ekroth =

Swedish footballer and bandy player

Personal information
- Born: 26 February 1892 Stallarholmen, Sweden
- Died: 29 November 1950 (aged 58) Stockholm, Sweden

Sport
- Sport: Football
- Club: AIK

August Helge "Ekis" Ekroth (26 February 1892 – 29 November 1950) was a Swedish football and bandy player. He competed in the 1912 Summer Olympics, playing as forward in one match in the main tournament. He won the Swedish league four times (1911, 1914, 1916 and 1923), making him the only football player in AIK with four national league titles. He scored 10 goals in 18 international games for Sweden.
