= Einar Hemming =

Swedish footballer

Personal information
- Date of birth: 4 April 1893
- Position: Defender

Senior career*
Years	Team	Apps	(Gls)
1913–1926	Djurgården		

International career
1919–1922	Sweden	6	(0)
- * Club domestic league appearances and goals

Einar Hemming (born 4 April 1893) was a Swedish footballer. Hemming was part of the Djurgården Swedish champions' team of 1917 and 1920. A defender, Hemming made six appearances for Sweden.

== Honours ==
Djurgårdens IF

- Svenska Mästerskapet: 1917, 1920
