= Ragnar Wicksell =

Swedish footballer

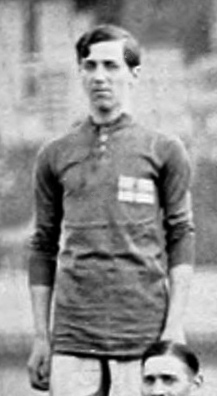
- Wicksell at the 1912 Olympics

Personal information
- Full name: Per Edgar Ragnar Wicksell
- Date of birth: 26 September 1892
- Place of birth: Litslena, Sweden
- Date of death: 31 July 1974 (aged 81)
- Place of death: Stockholm, Sweden
- Position: Half back

Senior career*
Years	Team	Apps	(Gls)
- Mariebergs IK
1911–	Djurgårdens IF		

International career
1911–1921	Sweden	32	(3)
- * Club domestic league appearances and goals

Per Edgar Ragnar "Ragge" Wicksell (26 September 1892 – 31 July 1974) was a Swedish football and bandy player. He competed in the 1912 Summer Olympics and in the 1920 Summer Olympics. In 1912, he played as midfielder one match in the main tournament as well as one match in the consolation tournament.

As a footballer, Wicksell started his career in Mariebergs IK and played for Djurgårdens IF Fotboll, beginning in 1911, becoming Swedish champion in 1912, 1915, 1917, and 1920. He also played in the 1916 and 1919 finals. He played mainly as a right and centre half back.

Wicksell made 32 appearances for Sweden and scored 3 goals. In 1926, he became Stor grabb.

As a bandy player, Wicksell played for Djurgårdens IF Bandy, becoming Swedish champion in 1912.

== Honours ==
=== Football ===
Djurgårdens IF

- Svenska Mästerskapet: 1912, 1915, 1917, 1920

=== Bandy ===
Djurgårdens IF

- Svenska Mästerskapet: 1912
