= Karl Karlstrand =

Swedish footballer (1893–1942)

Personal information
- Date of birth: 3 January 1893
- Date of death: 9 January 1942 (aged 49)

Senior career*
Years	Team	Apps	(Gls)
1908–1913	Rantens IF		
1913–1924	Djurgården		

International career
1914–1921	Sweden	8	(2)
- * Club domestic league appearances and goals

Karl Karlstrand (3 January 1893 – 9 January 1942) was a Swedish footballer. Karlstrand was part of the Djurgården Swedish champions' team of 1915 and 1920. Karlstrand made eight appearances for Sweden and scored two goals.

== Honours ==
Djurgårdens IF

- Svenska Mästerskapet: 1915, 1920
