= Mariebergs IK =

Swedish football and bandy club

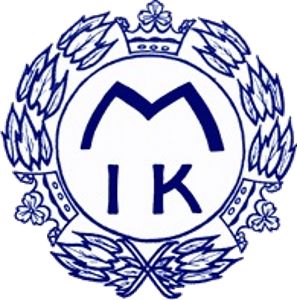
- Founded: 1902
- Based in: Stockholm, Sweden

Mariebergs IK was a Swedish sport club which in Stockholm. It was founded in 1902, mainly by students of Norra Latin living in Marieberg, among them brothers Rolf and S. Smedmark.

The club competed in several sports, bandy was dropped in 1926, football and ice hockey in 1927 and athletics in 1929. The club continued operation in bowling, curling and tennis.

In football, Mariebergs IK played one season in the highest level of the time, Svenska Serien, in the 1911–12 season. The Mariebergs IK football team was considered though and physical at the time. During the season Mariebergs IK was excluded and reinstated until they were excluded again as it was decided Stockholm could only have two clubs in the league – AIK and Djurgårdens IF. Among Mariebergs IK international footballers for Sweden were Gustaf Carlson, Sven Klang, Sven Ohlsson, Sixten Öberg, Knut Gustavsson, Gunnar Linder, and David Jonason.

In bandy, they reached the national championship semifinal in 1919, which they lost to IK Göta.

In athletics, it was the club for sprinter Rolf Smedmark and middle-distance runner John Zander. Axel Wiegandt won their first national championship title in 1908. The club won Mästerskapsstandaret as the best club at the 1916 Swedish Athletics Championships.

== Achievements ==
- Wicanderska Välgörenhetsskölden:
  - Runners-up (3): 1907, 1909, 1912
