= Karl Gustafsson =

Swedish footballer (1888–1960)

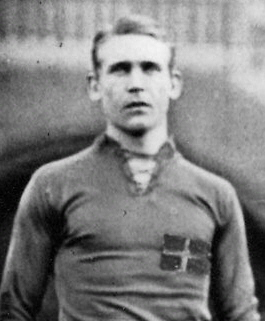
- Karl Gustafsson at the 1912 Olympics

Personal information
- Date of birth: 16 September 1888
- Place of birth: Köping, Sweden
- Date of death: 20 February 1960 (aged 71)
- Place of death: Köping, Sweden

Senior career*
Years	Team	Apps	(Gls)
1903–1909	IFK Köping		
1910–1920	Köpings IS		
1916–1925	Djurgården		
1926–1929	Köpings IS		
1929	Hallstahammar		
1930–1931	Westmannia		
1932	Hallstahammar		
1933–1935	Westmannia		

International career
1908–1924	Sweden	32	(22)
- * Club domestic league appearances and goals

Karl "Köping" Gustafsson (16 September 1888 – 20 February 1960) was a Swedish football player who competed at the 1908, 1912, and 1920 Summer Olympics.

== Career ==
=== Club career ===
On club level, Gustafsson represented IFK Köping, Köpings IS, Djurgården, Hallstahammar, and Westmannia. He won two Svenska Mästerskapet with Djurgården.

=== International career ===
On 12 July 1908, Gustafsson scored Sweden's first ever international goal in the team's first match, an 11–3 win over Norway. In 1912 he played as a midfielder in one match in the main tournament as well as one match in the consolation tournament. In the 1920 tournament he was also a part of the Swedish football team, as well as in the 1924 tournament, where he did not play.

In total, Gustafsson made 32 appearances for Sweden and scored 22 goals.

== Career statistics ==
=== International goals ===
Scores and results list Sweden's goal tally first and score column indicates the score after each Gustafsson goal.

List of international goals scored by Gustafsson
No.	Cap	Date	Venue	Opponent	Score	Result	Competition	Ref.
1	1	12 July 1908	Idrottsplatsen, Gothenburg, Sweden	Norway	1–1	11–3	Friendly	
2	1	12 July 1908	Idrottsplatsen, Gothenburg, Sweden	Norway	9–3	11–3	Friendly	
3	5	25 October 1908	De Diepput, The Hague, Netherlands	Netherlands	1–1	3–5	Friendly	
4	5	25 October 1908	De Diepput, The Hague, Netherlands	Netherlands	3–1	3–5	Friendly	
5	6	26 October 1908	Vivier d´Oie, Brussels, Belgium	Belgium	1–2	1–2	Friendly	
6	7	11 September 1910	Gamle Frogner Stadion, Oslo, Norway	Norway	2–0	4–0	Friendly	
7	7	11 September 1910	Gamle Frogner Stadion, Oslo, Norway	Norway	4–0	4–0	Friendly	
8	8	18 June 1911	Råsunda IP, Solna, Sweden	Germany	1–1	2–4	Friendly	
9	8	18 June 1911	Råsunda IP, Solna, Sweden	Germany	2–1	2–4	Friendly	
10	14	4 May 1913	Sokolniki Sports Club, Moscow, Russia	Russia	2–1	4–1	Friendly	
11	17	8 June 1913	Stockholm Olympic Stadium, Stockholm, Sweden	Norway	3–0	9–0	Friendly	
12	17	8 June 1913	Stockholm Olympic Stadium, Stockholm, Sweden	Norway	4–0	9–0	Friendly	
13	17	8 June 1913	Stockholm Olympic Stadium, Stockholm, Sweden	Norway	5–0	9–0	Friendly	
14	17	8 June 1913	Stockholm Olympic Stadium, Stockholm, Sweden	Norway	6–0	9–0	Friendly	
15	17	8 June 1913	Stockholm Olympic Stadium, Stockholm, Sweden	Norway	8–0	9–0	Friendly	
16	21	2 July 1916	Stockholm Olympic Stadium, Stockholm, Sweden	Norway	2–0	6–0	Friendly	
17	21	2 July 1916	Stockholm Olympic Stadium, Stockholm, Sweden	Norway	4–0	6–0	Friendly	
18	21	2 July 1916	Stockholm Olympic Stadium, Stockholm, Sweden	Norway	6–0	6–0	Friendly	
19	23	8 October 1916	Stockholm Olympic Stadium, Stockholm, Sweden	Denmark	2–0	4–0	Friendly	
20	24	16 September 1917	Frogner stadion, Oslo, Norway	Norway	2–0	2–0	Friendly	
21	25	14 October 1917	Stockholm Olympic Stadium, Stockholm, Sweden	Denmark	1–1	1–2	Friendly	
22	26	26 May 1918	Stockholm Olympic Stadium, Stockholm, Sweden	Norway	1–0	2–0	Friendly	

== Honours ==
Djurgårdens IF

- Svenska Mästerskapet: 1917, 1920
