= Sten Söderberg =

Swedish footballer and bandy player

Personal information
- Date of birth: 13 March 1893
- Date of death: 1969 (aged 75–76)

Senior career*
Years	Team	Apps	(Gls)
- Djurgården

International career
1913–1920	Sweden	9	(3)
- * Club domestic league appearances and goals

Sten Söderberg (13 March 1893 – 1969) was a Swedish footballer and bandy player. He made nine appearances and scored three goals for Sweden national team. As a footballer, he played as an inside forward.

In 1921, Söderberg moved to the United States.

Sten Söderberg's brother Jean Söderberg also played for Djurgårdens IF Bandy and Djurgårdens IF Fotboll, while his other brother Herman Söderberg represented Järva IS.

== Career ==
Söderberg represented Djurgården. He was part of the Svenska Mästerskapet winning teams of 1915, 1917, 1920.

== Honours ==
=== Football ===
Djurgårdens IF

- Svenska Mästerskapet (3): 1915, 1917, 1920

=== Bandy ===
Djurgårdens IF

- Svenska Mästerskapet: 1912
