= Football at the 1920 Summer Olympics – Men's team squads =

The following squads were named for the 1920 Summer Olympics tournament.

== Belgium ==
Head coach: Raoul Daufresne de la Chevalerie

No.	Pos.	Player	Date of birth (age)	Caps	Club
	MF	Félix Balyu	5 August 1891 (aged 29)		(Belgium) Club Brugge
	MF	Désiré Bastin	4 March 1900 (aged 20)		(Belgium) Royal Antwerp
	MF	Mathieu Bragard	10 March 1895 (aged 25)		(Belgium) R.C.S. Verviétois
	MF	Julien Cnudde	22 May 1897 (aged 23)		(Belgium) Union St. Gilloise
	FW	Robert Coppée	22 April 1895 (aged 25)		(Belgium) Union St. Gilloise
	GK	Jean De Bie	9 May 1892 (aged 28)		(Belgium) R.R.C. de Bruxelles
	DF	Léopold De Groof	2 February 1896 (aged 24)		(Belgium) Royal Antwerp
	FW	François Dogaer	6 July 1897 (aged 23)		(Belgium) K.R.C. Mechelen
	MF	André Fierens	8 February 1898 (aged 22)		(Belgium) Beerschot
	MF	Émile Hanse	10 August 1892 (aged 28)		(Belgium) Union St. Gilloise
	FW	Georges Hebdin	19 April 1889 (aged 31)		(Belgium) Union St. Gilloise
	MF	Henri Larnoe	18 May 1897 (aged 23)		(Belgium) Beerschot
	FW	Georges Michel	29 April 1898 (aged 22)		(Belgium) Léopold Football Club
	DF	Joseph Musch	12 October 1893 (aged 26)		(Belgium) Union St. Gilloise
	FW	Fernand Nisot	11 April 1895 (aged 25)		(Belgium) Leopold Football Club
	MF	August Pelsmaeker	15 November 1899 (aged 20)		(Belgium) Beerschot
	DF	Armand Swartenbroeks	30 June 1892 (aged 28)		(Belgium) Daring Club
	FW	Ivan Thys	29 April 1897 (aged 23)		(Belgium) Beerschot
	MF	Louis van Hege	8 May 1889 (aged 31)		(Belgium) Union St. Gilloise
	GK	Léon Vandermeiren	8 January 1896 (aged 24)		(Belgium) Daring Club
	DF	Oscar Verbeeck	6 June 1891 (aged 29)		(Belgium) Union St. Gilloise
	FW	Fernand Wertz	29 January 1894 (aged 26)		(Belgium) Royal Antwerp

== Czechoslovakia ==
Head coach: Josef Fanta

No.	Pos.	Player	Date of birth (age)	Caps	Club
	DF	Antonín Hojer	13 March 1894 (aged 26)	0	(Czechoslovakia) AC Sparta Prague
	FW	Antonín Janda-Očko	21 September 1892 (aged 27)	0	(Czechoslovakia) AC Sparta Prague
	GK	Rudolf Klapka	24 February 1885 (aged 35)	0	(Czechoslovakia) SK Viktoria Žižkov
	MF	František Kolenatý	29 January 1900 (aged 20)	0	(Czechoslovakia) AC Sparta Prague
	MF	Antonín Perner	29 January 1899 (aged 21)	0	(Czechoslovakia) AC Sparta Prague
	MF	Karel Pešek-Káďa	20 September 1895 (aged 24)	0	(Czechoslovakia) AC Sparta Prague
	GK	František Peyr	5 August 1896 (aged 24)	0	(Czechoslovakia) AC Sparta Prague
	FW	Václav Pilát	6 May 1888 (aged 32)	0	(Czechoslovakia) AC Sparta Prague
	FW	Jan Plaček	5 October 1894 (aged 25)	0	(Czechoslovakia) AC Sparta Prague
	DF	Miroslav Pospíšil	27 September 1890 (aged 29)	0	(Czechoslovakia) AC Sparta Prague
	FW	Josef Sedláček I	15 December 1893 (aged 26)	0	(Czechoslovakia) AC Sparta Prague
	MF	Emil Seifert	28 April 1900 (aged 20)	0	(Czechoslovakia) SK Viktoria Žižkov
	FW	Otakar Škvajn-Mazal	3 June 1894 (aged 26)	0	(Czechoslovakia) AC Sparta Prague
	DF	Karel Steiner	26 January 1895 (aged 25)	0	(Czechoslovakia) SK Viktoria Žižkov
	FW	Jan Vaník	7 May 1891 (aged 29)	0	(Czechoslovakia) SK Slavia Praha
	MF	Karel Hromadník		0	(Czechoslovakia) AFK Union Žižkov
	MF	Josef Kuchař	2 April 1901	0	(Czechoslovakia) AFK Union Žižkov
	FW	Václav Šubrt		0	(Czechoslovakia) SK Slavia Praha
	FW	Josef Janík		0	(Czechoslovakia) SK Slavia Praha
	FW	Václav Prošek		0	(Czechoslovakia) AFK Union Žižkov

== Denmark ==
Head coach: Jack Carr

No.	Pos.	Player	Date of birth (age)	Caps	Club
	MF	Gunnar Aaby	9 July 1895 (aged 25)	5	(Denmark) AB
	FW	Bernhard Andersen	5 February 1892 (aged 28)	4	(Denmark) BK Frem
	MF	Paul Berth	7 April 1890 (aged 30)	22	(Denmark) AB
	DF	Steen Steensen Blicher	11 January 1899 (aged 21)	2	(Denmark) KB
	FW	Leo Dannin	26 March 1898 (aged 22)	2	(Denmark) KB
	GK	Poul Graae	20 October 1899 (aged 20)	0	(Denmark) KB
	DF	Christian Grøthan	19 November 1890 (aged 29)	19	(Denmark) B.93
	FW	Carl Hansen	17 May 1898 (aged 22)	5	(Denmark) B 1903
	GK	Sophus Hansen	16 November 1889 (aged 30)	30	(Denmark) BK Frem
	MF	Jens Jensen	15 November 1890 (aged 29)	0	(Denmark) B 1903
	FW	Viggo Jørgensen	8 August 1899 (aged 21)	0	(Denmark) B 1903
	DF	Vilhelm Jørgensen	27 May 1897 (aged 23)	12	(Denmark) B 1903
	DF	Ivar Lykke	7 March 1889 (aged 31)	26	(Denmark) KB
	FW	Holger Forchhammer			
	DF	Kristian Middelboe	24 March 1881 (aged 39)		(Denmark) KB
	MF	Nils Middelboe	5 October 1887 (aged 32)	14	(England) Chelsea
	FW	Poul Nielsen	17 June 1895 (aged 25)	0	(Denmark) ØB
	FW	Alf Olsen	3 September 1893 (aged 26)	8	(Denmark) KB
	DF	Svend Ringsted	30 August 1893 (aged 26)	3	(Denmark) AB
	FW	Michael Rohde	3 March 1894 (aged 26)	13	(Denmark) B.93
	DF	Fritz Tarp	2 August 1899 (aged 21)	2	(Denmark) B.93
	MF	Samuel Thorsteinsson	1 January 1893 (aged 27)		(Denmark) AB

== Egypt ==
NOTE: The Egyptian Football Association was established in 1921, so this squad can not be considered a proper national team, but rather an Egyptian Select XI.

Head coach:

No.	Pos.	Player	Date of birth (age)	Caps	Club
	MF	Tewfik Abdullah	23 June 1897 (aged 23)	0	(Egypt) Zamalek
	FW	Sayed Abaza		0	(Egypt) Zamalek
	MF	Hassan Allouba		0	(Egypt) Tersana
	MF	Ali El-Hassani	1897	0	(Egypt) Zamalek
	DF	Mohamed El-Sayed		0	(Egypt) Al-Sekka Al-Hadid ^{El Sekka El Hadid}
	DF	Abdel Salam Hamdy	1894	0	(Egypt) Zamalek
	FW	Hussein Hegazi	14 September 1891 (aged 28)	0	(Egypt) Zamalek
	MF	Gamil Osman		0	(Egypt) Zamalek
	FW	Zaki Osman	14 October 1898 (aged 21)	0	(Egypt) Al Ahly
	MF	Riadh Shawki	1893	0	(Egypt) Al Ahly
	GK	Kamel Taha	1897	0	(Egypt) Al Ahly
	FW	Khalil Housny		0	(Egypt) Zamalek
	DF	Mohammed Gaber		0	(Egypt) Zamalek
	FW	Mahmoud Saqr Mokhtar		0	(Egypt) Al Ahly
	FW	Abbas Safwat		0	(Egypt) Al Ahly
	GK	Mohammed El-Anwar		0	(Egypt) Zamalek

== France ==
Head coach: (England) Fred Pentland

No.	Pos.	Player	Date of birth (age)	Caps	Club
	MF	Henri Bard	29 April 1892 (aged 28)		(France) CA Paris
	MF	Jean Batmale	18 September 1895 (aged 24)		(France) US Clichy
	DF	Édouard Baumann	4 March 1895 (aged 25)		(France) RC Paris
	FW	Oscar Bongard	10 April 1894 (aged 26)		(France) AS Strasbourg
	MF	Philippe Bonnardel	28 July 1899 (aged 21)		(France) Gallia Club Paris
	FW	Jean Boyer	2 February 1901 (aged 19)		(France) CASG Paris
	FW	Jules Dewaquez	9 March 1899 (aged 21)		(France) Olympique de Paris
	FW	Raymond Dubly	5 November 1893 (aged 26)		(France) RC Roubaix
	FW	Maurice Gastiger	3 October 1896 (aged 23)		(France) FEC Levallois
	MF	Pierre Gastiger	28 February 1893 (aged 27)		(France) FEC Levallois
	MF	Maurice Gravelines	17 July 1891 (aged 29)		(France) Olympique Lillois
	MF	François Hugues	13 August 1896 (aged 24)		(France) Red Star
	DF	Léon Huot	31 December 1898 (aged 21)		(France) CA Vitry
	FW	André Lassalle			(France) Stade Bordelais
	GK	Jean Le Bidois			(France) Sotteville FC
	MF	Maurice Leroux			(France) FC Dieppe
	MF	Nicolas Margueres			(France) AS Brest
	DF	Pierre Mony	23 March 1896 (aged 24)		(France) US Boulogne
	FW	Paul Nicolas	4 November 1899 (aged 20)		(France) Red Star
	GK	Albert Parsis	2 June 1890 (aged 30)		(France) US Tourcoing
	MF	René Petit	8 October 1899 (aged 20)		(France) Stade Bordelais
	DF	Alfred Roth	17 August 1891 (aged 29)		(France) AS Strasbourg

^{Maurice Gastiger and Pierre Gastiger – two brothers}

== Great Britain ==
Head coach: George Latham

No.	Pos.	Player	Date of birth (age)	Caps	Club
	MF	George Atkinson		3	(England) Bishop Auckland F.C.
	MF	Jack Brennan		0	(England) Manchester City F.C.
	FW	Harry Buck		0	(England) Millwall F.C.
	FW	Maurice Bunyan	14 October 1894 (aged 25)	0	(England) Chelsea F.C.
	DF	Basil H. Gates		2	(England) London Caledonians
	FW	Herbert Hambleton		0	(England) Corinthian F.C.
	MF	Charles Harbidge	15 July 1891 (aged 29)	4	(England) Reading F.C.
	FW	Wesley Eldred Harding		1	(England) Cambridge University
	FW	Jackie Hegan	24 January 1901 (aged 19)	1	(England) Corinthian F.C.
	MF	Kenneth Hunt	24 February 1884 (aged 36)	2	(England) Corinthian F.C.
	FW	Charles Robert Julian		0	(England) Old Westminsters
	DF	Arthur Knight	7 September 1887 (aged 32)	29	(England) Portsmouth F.C.
	GK	James Mitchell	18 November 1897 (aged 22)	2	(England) Manchester University
	FW	Frederick Nicholas	25 July 1893 (aged 27)	3	(England) Corinthian F.C.
	MF	John Payne	28 August 1889 (aged 31)	2	(England) Leytonstone F.C.
	FW	Herbert Prince	14 January 1892 (aged 28)	3	(England) Royal Army Medical Corps Aldershot
	FW	Richard Sloley	20 August 1891 (aged 29)	4	(England) Corinthian F.C.
	DF	Humphrey Ward	20 January 1899 (aged 21)	0	(England) Oxford University
	GK	George Wiley		0	(England) Belmont Mines Athletic

== Greece ==
Head coach: Georgios Kalafatis

No.	Pos.	Player	Date of birth (age)	Caps	Club
	FW	Georgios Andrianopoulos	25 October 1903 (aged 16)	0	(Greece) Piraikos Syndesmos
	FW	Giannis Andrianopoulos	0 December 1900 (aged 19–20)	0	(Greece) Piraiki Enosis
	FW	Georgios Chatziandreou	0 December 1899 (aged 20–21)	0	(Greece) Piraikos Syndesmos
	GK	Dimitris Demertzis		0	(Greece) P.P.A.O.
	MF	Sotiris Despotopoulos		0	(Greece) Panionios
	FW	Theodoros Dimitriou	0 December 1898 (aged 21–22)	0	(Greece) Panionios
	GK	Antonis Fotiadis	0 December 1899 (aged 20–21)	0	(Greece) Apollon Athens
	DF	Agamenon Gilis	0 December 1899 (aged 20–21)	0	(Greece) Apollon Athens
	MF	Dimitris Gotis	0 December 1899 (aged 20–21)	0	(Greece) Apollon Athens
	FW	Georgios Kalafatis	17 March 1890 (aged 30)	0	(Greece) P.P.A.O.
	DF	Nikolaos Kaloudis	0 December 1899 (aged 20–21)	0	(Greece) Piraiki Enosis
	MF	Apostolos Nikolaidis	19 April 1896 (aged 24)	0	(Greece) P.P.A.O.
	FW	Theodoros Nikolaidis	0 December 1899 (aged 20–21)	0	(Greece) Goudi Athens
	MF	Christos Peppas	0 December 1899 (aged 20–21)	0	(Greece) Piraiki Enosis
	FW	Vassilis Samios		0	(Greece) Apollon Athens
	FW	Giannis Stavropoulos		0	(Greece) P.P.A.O.

== Italy ==
Head coach: Giuseppe Milano

No.	Pos.	Player	Date of birth (age)	Caps	Club
	MF	Guido Ara		0	(Italy) U.S. Pro Vercelli
	FW	Emilio Badini	4 August 1897 (aged 23)	0	(Italy) Bologna F.C.
	FW	Adolfo Baloncieri	27 July 1897 (aged 23)	1	(Italy) U.S. Alessandria
	FW	Guglielmo Brezzi	24 December 1898 (aged 21)	3	(Italy) Genoa C.F.C.
	DF	Antonio Bruna	14 February 1895 (aged 25)	1	(Italy) F.C. Juventus
	MF	Luigi Burlando	23 January 1899 (aged 21)	0	(Italy) S.G. Andrea Doria
	GK	Piero Campelli	20 December 1893 (aged 26)	5	(Italy) F.C. Internazionale Milano
	FW	Adevildo De Marchi	24 August 1894 (aged 26)	0	(Italy) S.G. Andrea Doria
	MF	Gracco De Nardo	1893	0	(Italy) Spes Genova
	DF	Renzo De Vecchi	3 February 1894 (aged 26)	20	(Italy) Genoa C.F.C.
	FW	Pio Ferraris	19 May 1899 (aged 21)	0	(Italy) F.C. Juventus
	FW	Giuseppe Forlivesi	28 March 1894 (aged 26)	1	(Italy) Modena F.C.
	GK	Giuseppe Giaccone	9 September 1900 (aged 19)	2	(Italy) F.C. Juventus
	MF	Cesare Lovati	25 December 1894 (aged 25)	3	(Italy) A.C. Milan
	FW	Giustiniano Marucco	22 August 1899 (aged 21)	0	(Italy) Novara Calcio
	MF	Mario Meneghetti	4 February 1893 (aged 27)	1	(Italy) Novara Calcio
	MF	Giuseppe Parodi	17 December 1892 (aged 27)	2	(Italy) U.S. Pro Vercelli
	MF	Ettore Reynaudi	4 November 1895 (aged 24)	1	(Italy) Novara Calcio
	FW	Rinaldo Roggero	1891	0	(Italy) Savona F.B.C.
	DF	Virginio Rosetta	25 February 1902 (aged 18)	0	(Italy) U.S. Pro Vercelli
	FW	Aristodemo Santamaria	9 February 1892 (aged 28)	1	(Italy) Genoa C.F.C.
	MF	Enrico Sardi	1 April 1891 (aged 29)	4	(Italy) Genoa C.F.C.

== Luxembourg ==
Head coach:

No.	Pos.	Player	Date of birth (age)	Caps	Club
	MF	Robert Elter	20 April 1899 (aged 21)	0	Sporting Club Luxembourg
	MF	Émile Hamilius	16 May 1897 (aged 23)	0	(Luxembourg) CS Fola Esch
	FW	Charles Kieffer		0	(Luxembourg) Jeunesse Esch
	FW	Jean Kieffer		0	(Luxembourg) CS Fola Esch
	DF	Joseph Koetz	29 May 1897 (aged 23)	0	(Luxembourg) CS Fola Esch
	MF	Dominique Kelsen		0	(Luxembourg) CS Fola Esch
	GK	Charles Krüger	9 March 1896 (aged 24)	0	(Luxembourg) Stade Düdelingen
	MF	François Langers	16 March 1896 (aged 24)	0	(Luxembourg) Jeunesse Esch
	FW	Arthur Leesch	23 January 1894 (aged 26)	0	(Luxembourg) US Hollerich-Bonneweg
	FW	Jean Massard	17 September 1894 (aged 25)	2	(Luxembourg) CS Fola Esch
	MF	Léon Metzler	4 June 1896 (aged 24)	0	(Luxembourg) FCM Young Boys Diekirch
	DF	Thomas Schmit	26 April 1894 (aged 26)	1	(Luxembourg) US Hollerich-Bonneweg
	MF	Camille Schumacher	6 May 1896 (aged 24)	0	(Luxembourg) CS Fola Esch
	DF	J. Remy		0	(Luxembourg) FC The National
	DF	Michel Ungeheuer	16 June 1890 (aged 30)	2	(Luxembourg) US Hollerich-Bonneweg
	GK	Jean Valin		0	(Luxembourg) US Hollerich-Bonneweg

== Netherlands ==
Head coach: (England) Frederick Warburton

No.	Pos.	Player	Date of birth (age)	Caps	Club
	FW	Tinus van Beurden	30 April 1893 (aged 27)		(Netherlands) Willem II
	FW	Arie Bieshaar	15 March 1889 (aged 31)		(Netherlands) Haarlem
	MF	Koos Boerdam	9 June 1892 (aged 28)		(Netherlands) Sparta Rotterdam
	MF	Leo Bosschart	24 August 1888 (aged 32)		(Netherlands) HVV Quick
	FW	Evert Jan Bulder	24 December 1894 (aged 25)		(Netherlands) Be Quick
	FW	Jaap Bulder	27 September 1896 (aged 23)		(Netherlands) Be Quick
	DF	Harry Dénis	28 August 1896 (aged 24)		(Netherlands) HBS Craeyenhout
	FW	Joop van Dort	25 May 1893 (aged 27)		(Netherlands) Ajax
	FW	Ber Groosjohan	16 June 1897 (aged 23)		(Netherlands) VOC Rotterdam
	FW	Felix von Heijden	11 April 1890 (aged 30)		(Netherlands) Quick Nijmegen
	DF	Eb van der Kluft	23 May 1899 (aged 21)		(Netherlands) Blauw Wit
	MF	Frits Kuipers	11 July 1899 (aged 21)		(Netherlands) HFC
	MF	Evert van Linge	19 November 1895 (aged 24)		(Netherlands) Be Quick
	MF	Herman Legger	7 July 1895		(Netherlands) Be Quick
	GK	Dick MacNeill	7 January 1898 (aged 22)		(Netherlands) HVV
	FW	Jan de Natris	13 November 1895 (aged 24)		(Netherlands) Ajax
	FW	Piet Peereboom	14 January 1897 (aged 23)		(Netherlands) HBS Craeyenhout
	FW	Oscar van Rappard	2 April 1896 (aged 24)		(Netherlands) HBS Craeyenhout
	MF	Henk Steeman	15 January 1894 (aged 26)		(Netherlands) Sparta Rotterdam
	GK	Frans Tempel	20 March 1898 (aged 22)		(Netherlands) HVV Tubantia
	DF	Ben Verweij	31 August 1895 (aged 24)		(Netherlands) HFC
	MF	Jan de Vries			(Netherlands) ZAC Zwolle

== Norway ==
Head coach: (Scotland) James McPherson

No.	Pos.	Player	Date of birth (age)	Caps	Club
	FW	Rolf Aas	12 October 1891 (aged 28)		(Norway) Mercantile
	FW	Arne Andersen	21 April 1900 (aged 20)		(Norway) Kvik (Fredrikshald)
	MF	Gunnar Andersen	18 March 1890 (aged 30)		(Norway) Lyn
	DF	Otto Aulie	27 September 1894 (aged 25)		(Norway) Lyn
	FW	Einar Gundersen	20 September 1896 (aged 23)		(Norway) Odd
	MF	Asbjørn Halvorsen	3 December 1898 (aged 21)		(Norway) Sarpsborg
	FW	Johnny Helgesen	1 January 1897 (aged 23)		(Norway) Kvik (Fredrikshald)
	FW	Per Holm	10 January 1899 (aged 21)		(Norway) Sarpsborg
	DF	John Johnsen	17 March 1895 (aged 25)		(Norway) Brann
	GK	Alf Lagesen	24 June 1897 (aged 23)		(Norway) Drammen
	MF	Ellef Mohn	13 August 1894 (aged 26)		(Norway) Frigg
	FW	Michael Paulsen	1 March 1899 (aged 21)		(Norway) Ørn
	FW	Rolf Semb-Thorstvedt	3 April 1898 (aged 22)		(Norway) Frigg
	DF	Per Skou	20 May 1891 (aged 29)		(Norway) Lyn
	GK	Sigurd Wathne	12 February 1898 (aged 22)		(Norway) Brann
	FW	Einar Wilhelms	2 August 1895 (aged 25)		(Norway) Fredrikstad
	MF	Adolph Wold	30 September 1892 (aged 27)		(Norway) Ready

The following players were also named as reserves, but did not play in any matches: Kaare Engebretsen, Erich Graff-Wang and Alexander Olsen

== Spain ==
Head coach: Francisco Bru

No.	Pos.	Player	Date of birth (age)	Caps	Club
	FW	Patricio Arabolaza	17 March 1893 (aged 27)	0	(Spain) Real Unión
	DF	Mariano Arrate	12 August 1892 (aged 28)	0	(Spain) Real Sociedad
	MF	Juan Artola	29 November 1895 (aged 24)	0	(Spain) Real Sociedad
	DF	José María Belausteguigoitia «Belauste»	3 September 1889 (aged 30)	0	(Spain) Athletic Bilbao
	MF	Sabino Bilbao	11 December 1897 (aged 22)	0	(Spain) Athletic Bilbao
	DF	Manuel Carrasco	27 January 1894 (aged 26)	0	(Spain) Real Unión
	GK	Agustín Eizaguirre	7 October 1897 (aged 22)	0	(Spain) Real Sociedad
	MF	Ramón Eguiazábal	14 April 1896 (aged 24)	0	(Spain) Real Unión
	MF	Roman Emery	1902	0	(Spain) Real Unión
	FW	Ramón Gil «Moncho Gil»	16 August 1897 (aged 23)	0	(Spain) Real Vigo Sporting
	FW	Domingo Acedo	6 June 1898 (aged 22)	0	(Spain) Athletic Bilbao
	FW	Ramón González	1898	0	(Spain) Real Vigo Sporting
	FW	Silverio Izaguirre	26 April 1898 (aged 22)	0	(Spain) Real Sociedad
	FW	Rafael Moreno «Pichichi»	23 May 1892 (aged 28)	0	(Spain) Athletic Bilbao
	DF	Luis Otero	22 October 1893 (aged 26)	0	(Spain) Real Vigo Sporting
	FW	Francisco Pagazaurtundúa «Pagaza»	20 October 1894 (aged 25)	0	(Spain) Racing de Santander
	MF	José Samitier	2 February 1902 (aged 18)	0	(Spain) FC Barcelona
	MF	Agustín Sancho	3 September 1896 (aged 23)	0	(Spain) FC Barcelona
	FW	Félix Sesúmaga	12 October 1898 (aged 21)	0	(Spain) FC Barcelona
	DF	Pedro Vallana	29 November 1897 (aged 22)	0	(Spain) Arenas de Guecho
	FW	Joaquín Vázquez	9 November 1897 (aged 22)	0	(Spain) Racing de Ferrol
	GK	Ricardo Zamora	21 January 1901 (aged 19)	0	(Spain) FC Barcelona

== Sweden ==
Head coach: Anton Johanson

No.	Pos.	Player	Date of birth (age)	Caps	Club
	FW	Rune Bergström	5 September 1891 (aged 28)	17	(Sweden) AIK
	FW	Albin Dahl	2 January 1900 (aged 20)	3	(Sweden) Landskrona BoIS
	MF	Karl «Köping» Gustafsson	16 September 1888 (aged 31)	28	(Sweden) Djurgårdens IF
	DF	Fritjof «Fritte» Hillén	19 May 1893 (aged 27)	1	(Sweden) GAIS
	FW	Herbert «Murren» Karlsson	8 September 1896 (aged 23)	10	(Sweden) IFK Göteborg
	DF	Valdus «Gobben» Lund	4 April 1895 (aged 25)	12	(Sweden) IFK Göteborg
	DF	Bertil «Nocke» Nordenskjöld	24 May 1891 (aged 29)	6	(Sweden) Djurgårdens IF
	MF	Albert «Abbe» Öijermark	16 February 1900 (aged 20)	0	(Sweden) Djurgårdens IF
	FW	Albert «Abben» Olsson	28 November 1896 (aged 23)	2	(Sweden) GAIS
	FW	Mauritz «Moje» Sandberg	15 November 1895 (aged 24)	8	(Sweden) IFK Göteborg
	MF	Ragnar «Ragge» Wicksell	26 September 1892 (aged 27)	28	(Sweden) Djurgårdens IF
	GK	Robert Zander	18 September 1895 (aged 24)	8	(Sweden) Örgryte IS

The following players were also named as reserves, but did not play in any matches: Fritz Carlsson, Erik Dahlström, Einar Halling-Johansson, Erik Hjelm, Nils Karlsson, Sven Klang, Vidar Stenborg, Henning Svensson, John Torstensson and Rune Wenzel.

== Yugoslavia ==
Head coach: Veljko Ugrinić

No.	Pos.	Player	Date of birth (age)	Caps	Club
	FW	Slavin Cindrić	10 August 1901 (aged 19)	0	(Kingdom of Yugoslavia) Concordia Zagreb
	MF	Artur Dubravčić	15 September 1894 (aged 25)	0	(Kingdom of Yugoslavia) Concordia Zagreb
	MF	Ivan Granec	8 September 1897 (aged 22)	0	(Kingdom of Yugoslavia) Građanski Zagreb
	FW	Andrija Kojić	28 August 1896 (aged 24)	0	(Kingdom of Yugoslavia) BSK Belgrade
	FW	Emil Perška	20 June 1897 (aged 23)	0	(Kingdom of Yugoslavia) Građanski Zagreb
	DF	Branimir Porobić	5 January 1901 (aged 19)	0	(Kingdom of Yugoslavia) BSK Belgrade
	DF	Rudolf Rupec	17 September 1895 (aged 24)	0	(Kingdom of Yugoslavia) Građanski Zagreb
	FW	Jovan Ružić	12 December 1898 (aged 21)	0	(Kingdom of Yugoslavia) Jugoslavija Belgrade
	DF	Jaroslav Šifer	12 August 1895 (aged 25)	0	(Kingdom of Yugoslavia) Građanski Zagreb
	MF	Nikola Simić	2 December 1897 (aged 22)	0	(Kingdom of Yugoslavia) BSK Belgrade
	MF	Josip Šolc	30 January 1898 (aged 22)	0	(Kingdom of Yugoslavia) Concordia Zagreb
	DF	Stanko Tavčar	2 February 1898 (aged 22)	0	(Kingdom of Yugoslavia) Ilirija Ljubljana
	MF	Dragutin Vragović	18 September 1897 (aged 22)	0	(Kingdom of Yugoslavia) Građanski Zagreb
	GK	Dragutin Vrđuka	3 April 1895 (aged 25)	0	(Kingdom of Yugoslavia) Građanski Zagreb
	DF	Vjekoslav Župančić	7 February 1900 (aged 20)	0	(Kingdom of Yugoslavia) HAŠK Zagreb

The following players were also named as reserves, but did not play in any matches: Branko Jopantević and Nikola Stanković
