= 1920–21 in Swedish football =

The 1920-21 season in Swedish football, starting January 1920 and ending July 1921:

== Honours ==
=== Official titles ===
Title	Team	Reason
1920 Swedish Champions	Djurgårdens IF	Winners of Svenska Mästerskapet

=== Competitions ===
Level	Competition	Team
1st level	Division 1 Svenska Serien 1920–21	Örgryte IS
2nd level	Division 2 Uppsvenska Serien 1920–21	IK Sirius
2nd level	Division 2 Mellansvenska Serien 1920–21	IK Sleipner
2nd level	Division 2 Västsvenska Serien 1920–21	Fässbergs IF
2nd level	Division 2 Sydsvenska Serien 1920–21	Malmö FF
Championship Cup	Svenska Mästerskapet 1920	Djurgårdens IF
Cup competition	Kamratmästerskapen 1920	IFK Göteborg
Cup competition	Wicanderska Välgörenhetsskölden 1920	No winner

== Promotions, relegations and qualifications ==
=== Promotions ===
Promoted from	Promoted to	Team	Reason
Division 2 Mellansvenska Serien 1920–21	Division 1 Svenska Serien Östra 1922–23	IK Sleipner	Unknown
Division 2 Sydsvenska Serien 1920–21	Division 1 Svenska Serien Västra 1922–23	Malmö FF	Unknown
Unknown	Division 2 Uppsvenska Serien 1922–23	Värtans IK	Unknown
Unknown	Division 2 Mellansvenska Serien 1922–23	Katrineholms AIK	Unknown
Unknown	Division 2 Mellansvenska Serien 1922–23	Västerås IK	Unknown
Unknown	Division 2 Västsvenska Serien 1922–23	IFK Vänersborg	Unknown

=== League transfers ===
Transferred from	Transferred to	Team	Reason
Division 2 Mellansvenska Serien 1920–21	Division 2 Uppsvenska Serien 1922–23	Mariebergs IK	Unknown
Division 2 Mellansvenska Serien 1920–21	Division 2 Uppsvenska Serien 1922–23	IFK Stockholm	Unknown

=== Relegations ===
Relegated from	Relegated to	Team	Reason
Division 2 Uppsvenska Serien 1920–21	Unknown	Upsala IF	Unknown
Division 2 Uppsvenska Serien 1920–21	Unknown	IF Vesta	Unknown
Division 2 Västsvenska Serien 1920–21	Unknown	IFK Skövde	Unknown
Division 2 Sydsvenska Serien 1920–21	Unknown	IS Halmia	No Sydsvenska Serien next season
Division 2 Sydsvenska Serien 1920–21	Unknown	IFK Helsingborg	No Sydsvenska Serien next season
Division 2 Sydsvenska Serien 1920–21	Unknown	Husqvarna IF	No Sydsvenska Serien next season
Division 2 Sydsvenska Serien 1920–21	Unknown	Jönköpings IS	No Sydsvenska Serien next season
Division 2 Sydsvenska Serien 1920–21	Unknown	Landskrona BoIS	No Sydsvenska Serien next season

== Domestic results ==
=== Division 1 Svenska Serien 1920–21 ===

	Team	Pld	W	D	L	GF		GA	GD	Pts
1	Örgryte IS	18	10	5	3	27	–	10	+17	25
2	GAIS	18	10	3	5	47	–	25	+22	23
3	Hammarby IF	18	9	4	5	35	–	27	+8	22
4	Helsingborgs IF	18	9	4	5	33	–	27	+6	22
5	IFK Göteborg	18	8	4	6	39	–	21	+18	20
6	IFK Malmö	18	9	1	8	47	–	47	0	19
7	Djurgårdens IF	18	6	4	8	24	–	33	-9	16
8	AIK	18	5	3	10	30	–	38	-8	13
9	IFK Eskilstuna	18	4	3	11	23	–	45	-22	11
10	IFK Norrköping	18	2	5	11	19	–	51	-32	9

=== Division 2 Uppsvenska Serien 1920–21 ===

	Team	Pld	W	D	L	GF		GA	GD	Pts
1	IK Sirius	12	10	0	2	34	–	13	+21	20
2	IF Linnéa	12	7	1	4	32	–	21	+11	15
3	Järva IS	12	7	1	4	25	–	19	+6	15
4	Stockholms BK	12	7	1	4	21	–	23	-2	15
5	Westermalms IF	12	6	1	5	33	–	17	+16	13
6	IF Vesta	12	0	4	8	13	–	30	-27	4
7	Upsala IF	12	0	2	10	7	–	42	-35	2

=== Division 2 Mellansvenska Serien 1920–21 ===
	Team	Pld	W	D	L	GF		GA	GD	Pts
1	IK Sleipner	14	11	2	1	36	–	14	+22	24
2	Mariebergs IK	14	10	1	3	45	–	17	+28	21
3	IK City	14	7	3	4	29	–	17	+12	17
4	IFK Västerås	14	5	3	6	23	–	29	-6	13
5	Örebro SK	14	5	1	8	20	–	30	-10	11
6	IFK Arboga	14	5	0	9	18	–	26	-8	10
7	Köpings IS	14	4	2	8	21	–	35	-14	10
8	IFK Stockholm	14	2	2	10	15	–	39	-24	6

=== Division 2 Västsvenska Serien 1920–21 ===
	Team	Pld	W	D	L	GF		GA	GD	Pts
1	Fässbergs IF	14	10	1	3	39	–	15	+24	21
2	Skara IF	14	8	3	3	24	–	15	+9	19
3	IF Elfsborg	14	6	4	4	46	–	24	+22	16
4	Vänersborgs IF	14	7	2	5	31	–	22	+9	16
5	IFK Uddevalla	14	7	1	6	36	–	28	+8	15
6	IK Virgo	14	5	3	6	25	–	25	0	13
7	IF Heimer	14	4	2	9	29	–	38	-9	10
8	IFK Skövde	14	1	0	13	9	–	72	-63	2

=== Division 2 Sydsvenska Serien 1920–21 ===
	Team	Pld	W	D	L	GF		GA	GD	Pts
1	Malmö FF	10	7	1	2	31	–	20	+11	15
2	Landskrona BoIS	10	6	1	3	28	–	19	+9	13
3	IS Halmia	10	4	1	5	19	–	21	-2	9
4	Jönköpings IS	10	4	0	6	18	–	28	-10	8
5	Husqvarna IF	10	4	0	6	18	–	29	-11	8
6	IFK Helsingborg	10	3	1	6	23	–	20	+3	7

=== Svenska Mästerskapet 1920 ===
Final

October 24, 1920

Djurgårdens IF	1–0	IK Sleipner

Stockholms Stadion, Stockholm

=== Kamratmästerskapen 1920 ===
Final

September 5, 1920

IFK Göteborg	2–2 3–2 (aet)	IFK Västerås

Herrgärdets IP, Västerås

=== Wicanderska Välgörenhetsskölden 1920 ===
Final

May 13, 1920

Hammarby IF	–	Mariebergs IK

Råsunda IP, Solna

== National team results ==
May 30, 1920
Friendly
№ 56

Sweden	4–0	Finland
Dahl 38', 69'; Krantz 75', 76'

Stockholms Stadion, Stockholm
Attendance: 10,000
Referee: Putz (Belgium)

Sweden: Robert Zander - Albert Andersson, Erik Lillienberg - John Johansson, Sven Friberg, Nils Karlsson - Rune Wenzel, Albin Dahl, Karl Krantz, Joel Björkman, Fridolf Johnsson.

June 6, 1920
Friendly
№ 57

Sweden	0–1	Switzerland
		Martenet 82'

Stockholms Stadion, Stockholm
Attendance: 12,000
Referee: Eymers (Netherlands)

Sweden: Robert Zander - Valdus Lund, Henning Svensson - Oskar Berndtsson, Ragnar Wicksell, Nils Karlsson - Rune Wenzel, Albert Olsson, Herbert Karlsson, Albin Dahl, Mauritz Sandberg.

June 27, 1920
Friendly
№ 58

Norway	0–3	Sweden
		Andersson 10'; Bergström 22'; Karlsson 65'

Gressbanen, Kristiania
Attendance: 14,000
Referee: Vestergaard (Denmark)

Sweden: Robert Zander - Bertil Nordenskjöld, Einar Hemming - Oskar Berndtsson, Ragnar Wicksell, Karl Gustafsson - Rune Bergström, Sten Söderberg, Herbert Karlsson, Sune Andersson, Carl Karlstrand.

August 28, 1920
1920 Olympics 1st round
№ 59

Sweden	9–0	Greece
Olsson 4', 79'; Karlsson 15', 20', 21', 51', 85'; Wicksell 25'; Dahl 31'

Olympisch Stadion, Antwerp
Attendance: 10,000
Referee: Barette (Belgium)

Sweden: Robert Zander - Valdus Lund, Fritjof Hillén - Bertil Nordenskjöld, Ragnar Wicksell, Karl Gustafsson - Rune Bergström, Albert Olsson, Herbert Karlsson, Albin Dahl, Mauritz Sandberg.

August 29, 1920
1920 Olympics quarter-finals
№ 60

Netherlands	5–4 (aet)	Sweden
Groosjohan 9', 58'; Bulder 41', 88' (p) de Natris 115' (et)		Karlsson 19', 32'; Olsson 20'; Dahl 72'

Bosuil, Antwerp
Attendance: 3,000
Referee: Fanta (Czechoslovakia)

Sweden: Robert Zander - Valdus Lund, Fritjof Hillén - Albert Öijermark, Ragnar Wicksell, Karl Gustafsson - Rune Bergström, Albert Olsson, Herbert Karlsson, Albin Dahl, Mauritz Sandberg.

September 1, 1920
1920 Olympics consol. 1st round
№ 61

Spain	2–1	Sweden
Belauste 51'; Acedo 53'		Dahl 28'

Bosuil, Antwerp
Attendance: 3,000
Referee: Mauro (Italy)

Sweden: Robert Zander - Valdus Lund, Bertil Nordenskjöld - Albert Öijermark, Ragnar Wicksell, Karl Gustafsson - Rune Bergström, Albert Olsson, Herbert Karlsson, Albin Dahl, Mauritz Sandberg.

September 19, 1920
Friendly
№ 62

Finland	1–0	Sweden
Öhman 36'

Tölö bollplan, Helsinki
Attendance: 6,000
Referee: Johnsen (Norway)

Sweden: Erik Hillerström - Theodor Malm, Justus Gustafsson - Oskar Berndtsson, Bruno Lindström, Edvin Holm - Oscar Hagelin, Rudolf Kock, Helge Ekroth, Helmer Edlund, Herbert Ohlsson.

September 26, 1920
Friendly
№ 63

Sweden	0–0	Norway

Stockholms Stadion, Stockholm
Attendance: 15,000
Referee: Boas (Netherlands)

Sweden: Victor Olsson - Ragnar Eriksson, Gösta Wihlborg - Thure Söderqvist, Sven Friberg, August Vogel - Gottfrid Johansson, Sten Söderberg, Helge Ekroth, Karl Karlberg, Bror Arontzon.

October 10, 1920
Friendly
№ 64

Sweden	0–2	Denmark
		Hansen 30'; Rohde 44'

Stockholms Stadion, Stockholm
Attendance: 10,000
Referee: Boas (Netherlands)

Sweden: Victor Olsson - Ragnar Eriksson, Gösta Wihlborg - Ernst Eliasson, Sven Friberg, Ivar Klingström - Gottfrid Johansson, Sjunne Hallberg, Karl Krantz, Sune Andersson, Bror Arontzon.

March 26, 1921
Friendly
№ 65

Austria	2–2	Sweden
Kuthan 42', 76'		Horndahl 5'; Andersson 88'

Simmeringer Sportplatz, Vienna
Attendance: 35,000
Referee: Boas (Netherlands)

Sweden: Sigfrid Lindberg - John Torstensson, Arvid Persson - Hjalmar Andersson, Gustaf Möller, Carl Lindström - Rune Bergström, Erik Andersson, Otto Malm, Victor Horndahl, Bror Arontzon ( Gösta Nilsson).

May 29, 1921
Friendly
№ 66

Sweden	0–3	Finland
		Öhman 10'; Kelin 28', 89'

Stockholms Stadion, Stockholm
Attendance: 17,000
Referee: Andersen (Denmark)

Sweden: Victor Olsson - Gustav Ehn, Gösta Wihlborg - Paul Sellberg, Helge Andersson, Thure Söderqvist - Ernst Westerlund, Carl Söderqvist, Gustav Björk, Karl Karlberg, Nils Carlbom.

June 19, 1921
Friendly
№ 67

Norway	3–1	Sweden
Gundersen 44'; Strøm 48'; Resberg 73'		Kock 75'

Gressbanen, Kristiania
Attendance: 15,000
Referee: Howcroft (England)

Sweden: Sven Klang - Albert Andersson, Edvin Holm - Birger Dahlgren, Sven Friberg, Axel Corall ( Justus Gustafsson) - Rune Bergström, Gustaf Svensson, Helmer Svedberg, Per Kaufeldt, Rudolf Kock.

July 22, 1921
Friendly
№ 68

Estonia	0–0	Sweden

Tiigiveski spordiplats, Tallinn
Attendance: 2,000
Referee: Akel (Estonia)

Sweden: David Andersson - Nils Pettersson, Isidor Carlsson - Gösta Pettersson-Pejne, Harald Andersson, Eugen Boström - Ruben Nilsson, Bertil Karlsson, Eric Dahlström, John Björkström, Ivar Eriksson.

July 24, 1921
Friendly
№ 69

Sweden	1–3	Austria
Dahl 44'		Uridil 9'; Kuthan 17'; Swatosch 59'

Stockholms Stadion, Stockholm
Attendance: 18,000
Referee: Boas (Netherlands)

Sweden: Robert Zander - Albert Andersson, Erik Lillienberg - Ivar Klingström, Sven Friberg, Nils Karlsson - Heinrich Brost, Erik Andersson, Herbert Karlsson, Albin Dahl, Rudolf Kock.

== National team players in season 1920/21 ==
name	pos.	caps	goals	club
Albert "Banjo" Andersson	DF	3	0	Örgryte IS
David "Kimpen" Andersson	GK	1	0	IK City
Erik Andersson	FW	2	1	IFK Malmö
Harald Andersson	MF	1	0	IFK Eskilstuna
Helge "Snopparn" Andersson	MF	1	0	Hammarby IF
Hjalmar "Julle" Andersson	MF	1	0	Hälsingborgs IF
Sune Andersson	FW	2	1	IF Olympia
Bror Arontzon	FW	3	0	IF Elfsborg
Rune Bergström	FW	6	1	AIK
Oskar Berndtsson	MF	3	0	AIK
Gustav "Måsen" Björk	FW	1	0	Hammarby IF
Joel "Jylle" Björkman	FW	1	0	GAIS
John Björkström	FW	1	0	Tunafors SK
Eugen Boström	MF	1	0	IK City
Heinrich "Hanke" Brost	FW	1	0	IFK Malmö
Nils "Nicka" Carlbom	FW	1	0	Hammarby IF
Isidor Carlsson	DF	1	0	IK City
Axel Corall	MF	1	0	IK Sleipner
Albin Dahl	FW	6	6	Landskrona BoIS
Birger Dahlgren	MF	1	0	Landskrona BoIS
Eric Dahlström	FW	1	0	IFK Eskilstuna
Helmer "Valdus" Edlund	FW	1	0	IK Sleipner
Gustav Ehn	DF	1	0	Stockholms BK
Helge "Ekis" Ekroth	FW	2	0	AIK
Ernst Eliasson	MF	1	0	Örgryte IS
Ivar Eriksson	FW	1	0	IK City
Ragnar Eriksson	DF	2	0	IFK Eskilstuna
Sven Friberg	MF	5	0	Örgryte IS
Justus "Negern" Gustafsson	DF/MF	2	0	AIK
Karl "Köping" Gustafsson	MF	4	0	Djurgårdens IF
Oscar (Oskar) Hagelin	FW	1	0	IK Sleipner
Sjunne Hallberg	FW	1	0	Örgryte IS
Einar "Hacko" Hemming	DF	1	0	Djurgårdens IF
Fritjof "Fritte" Hillén	DF	2	0	GAIS
Erik "Hiller" Hillerström	GK	1	0	AIK
Edvin Holm	MF/DF	2	0	AIK
Victor Horndahl	FW	1	1	Hälsingborgs IF
Gottfrid "Gotte" Johansson	FW	2	0	Djurgårdens IF
John "Snärjarn" Johansson	MF	1	0	GAIS
Fridolf Johnsson	FW	1	0	GAIS
Karl Karlberg	FW	2	0	Hammarby IF
Bertil Karlsson	FW	1	0	IFK Eskilstuna
Herbert "Murren" Karlsson	FW	6	8	IFK Göteborg
Nils Karlsson	MF	3	0	GAIS
Carl Karlstrand	FW	1	0	Djurgårdens IF
Per "Pära" Kaufeldt	FW	1	0	AIK
Sven Klang	GK	1	0	Mariebergs IK
Ivar "Klinga" Klingström	MF	2	0	Örgryte IS
Rudolf "Putte" Kock	FW	3	1	AIK
Karl Krantz	FW	2	2	Örgryte IS
Erik "Flintis" Lillienberg	DF	2	0	Örgryte IS
Sigfrid "Sigge" Lindberg	GK	1	0	Hälsingborgs IF
Bruno Lindström	MF	1	0	AIK
Carl Lindström	MF	1	0	IFK Malmö
Valdus "Gobben" Lund	DF	4	0	IFK Göteborg
Otto "Petter" Malm	FW	1	0	Hälsingborgs IF
Theodor "Todde" Malm	DF	1	0	AIK
Gustaf (Gustav) Möller	MF	1	0	IFK Malmö
Gösta Nilsson	FW	1	0	Malmö FF
Ruben "Brandkårn" Nilsson	FW	1	0	IFK Eskilstuna
Bertil "Nocke" Nordenskjöld	DF/MF	3	0	Djurgårdens IF
Herbert "Banken" Ohlsson	FW	1	0	AIK
Victor "Kucku" Olsson	GK	3	0	Hammarby IF
Albert "Abbe" Öijermark	MF	2	0	Djurgårdens IF
Albert "Abben" Olsson	FW	4	3	GAIS
Arvid Persson	DF	1	0	IFK Malmö
Nils "Knös" Pettersson	DF	1	0	IFK Norrköping
Gösta Pettersson-Pejne	MF	1	0	IFK Eskilstuna
Mauritz "Moje" Sandberg	FW	4	0	IFK Göteborg
Paul Sellberg	MF	1	0	Hammarby IF
Sten "Knata" Söderberg	FW	2	0	Djurgårdens IF
Carl (Karl) Söderqvist	FW	1	0	Hammarby IF
Thure Söderqvist	MF	2	0	Hammarby IF
Helmer "Pysen" Svedberg	FW	1	0	AIK
Gustaf "Sotarn" Svensson	FW	1	0	Järva IS
Henning Svensson	DF	1	0	IFK Göteborg
John "Tonte" Torstensson	DF	1	0	Malmö FF
August Vogel	MF	1	0	IFK Uddevalla
Rune Wenzel	FW	2	0	GAIS
Ernst "Rio" Westerlund	FW	1	0	Hammarby IF
Ragnar "Ragge" Wicksell	MF	4	1	Djurgårdens IF
Gösta "Pysen" Wihlborg	DF	3	0	Hammarby IF
Robert Zander	GK	7	0	Örgryte IS
