= 1921–22 in Swedish football =

The 1921-22 season in Swedish football, starting August 1921 and ending February 1922:

== Honours ==
=== Official titles ===
Title	Team	Reason
1921 Swedish Champions	IFK Eskilstuna	Winners of Svenska Mästerskapet

=== Competitions ===
Level	Competition	Team
Championship Cup	Svenska Mästerskapet 1921	IFK Eskilstuna
Cup competition	Kamratmästerskapen 1921	IFK Göteborg

== Domestic results ==
=== Svenska Mästerskapet 1921 ===
Final

October 16, 1921

IFK Eskilstuna	2–1	IK Sleipner

Stockholms Stadion, Stockholm

=== Kamratmästerskapen 1921 ===
Final

September 3, 1922

IFK Göteborg	2–0	IFK Eskilstuna

Ullevi, Gothenburg

== National team results ==
September 18, 1921
Friendly
№ 70

Sweden	0–3	Norway
		Gundersen 9'; Holm 19'; Wihelms 44'

Stockholms Stadion, Stockholm
Attendance: 12,000
Referee: Andersen (Denmark)

Sweden: Victor Olsson - Ragnar Wicksell, Einar Hemming - Albert Öijermark, Gustaf Carlson, Einar Halling-Johansson - Rudolf Kock, Sune Andersson, Gustav Björk, Helge Ekroth, Carl Karlstrand.

October 9, 1921
Friendly
№ 71

Sweden	0–0	Denmark

Stockholms Stadion, Stockholm
Attendance: 18,000
Referee: Smedvik (Norway)

Sweden: Sigfrid Lindberg - Albert Andersson, Fritjof Hillén - Albert Öijermark, Ragnar Wicksell, Nils Karlsson - Rune Wenzel, Herbert Karlsson, Albert Olsson, Erik Hjelm, Rudolf Kock.

November 6, 1921
Friendly
№ 72

Hungary	4–2	Sweden
Orth 14', 49', 53'; Schlosser 76'		Karlsson 70' (p), 87'

Stadion Üllői Út, Budapest
Attendance: 34,000
Referee: Boas (Netherlands)

Sweden: Sigfrid Lindberg - Albert Andersson, Vidar Stenborg (18' Justus Gustafsson) - Gustaf Möller, Gustaf Johansson, Nils Karlsson - Nils Larsson, Herbert Karlsson, Bertil Appelskog, Erik Hjelm, Rudolf Kock.

November 13, 1921
Friendly
№ 73

Czechoslovakia	2–2	Sweden
Janda 33', 35'		Karlsson 30'; Edlund 65'

Letenský Stadion, Prague
Attendance: 16,000
Referee: Retschury (Austria)

Sweden: Sigfrid Lindberg - Albert Andersson, Erik Lillienberg - Gustaf Möller, Gustaf Johansson, Nils Karlsson - Nils Larsson, Helmer Edlund, Herbert Karlsson, Erik Hjelm, Rudolf Kock.

== National team players in season 1921/22 ==
name	pos.	caps	goals	club
Albert "Banjo" Andersson	DF	3	0	Örgryte IS
Sune Andersson	FW	1	0	Djurgårdens IF
Bertil "Bebbe" Appelskog	FW	1	0	IK Sleipner
Gustav "Måsen" Björk	FW	1	0	Hammarby IF
Gustaf "Gurra" Carlson	MF	1	0	Mariebergs IK
Helmer "Valdus" Edlund	FW	1	1	IK Sleipner
Helge "Ekis" Ekroth	FW	1	0	AIK
Justus "Negern" Gustafsson	DF/MF	1	0	AIK
Einar Halling-Johansson	MF	1	0	Mariebergs IK
Einar "Hacko" Hemming	DF	1	0	Djurgårdens IF
Fritjof "Fritte" Hillén	DF	1	0	GAIS
Erik Hjelm	FW	3	0	IFK Göteborg
Gustaf "Banan" Johansson	MF	2	0	GAIS
Herbert "Murren" Karlsson	FW	3	3	IFK Göteborg
Nils Karlsson	MF	3	0	GAIS
Carl Karlstrand	FW	1	0	Djurgårdens IF
Rudolf "Putte" Kock	FW	4	0	AIK
Nils "Skottland" Larsson	FW	2	0	Örgryte IS
Erik "Flintis" Lillienberg	DF	1	0	Örgryte IS
Sigfrid "Sigge" Lindberg	GK	3	0	Hälsingborgs IF
Gustaf Möller	MF	2	0	IFK Malmö
Victor "Kucku" Olsson	GK	1	0	Hammarby IF
Albert "Abbe" Öijermark	MF	2	0	Djurgårdens IF
Albert "Abben" Olsson	FW	1	0	GAIS
Vidar Stenborg	DF	1	0	IFK Eskilstuna
Rune Wenzel	FW	1	0	GAIS
Ragnar "Ragge" Wicksell	DF/MF	2	0	Djurgårdens IF
