= George Atkinson =

George Atkinson may refer to:

== Art ==
- George Mounsey Wheatley Atkinson (1806–1884), Irish marine painter
- George Francklin Atkinson (1822–1859), British officer and colonial artist
- George Atkinson (artist) (1880–1941), Irish printmaker and National College of Art director

== Government and politics ==
- George Atkinson (Surveyor General), Surveyor General of Ceylon appointed in 1805
- George Maitland Atkinson (1860–1940), Canadian politician
- George W. Atkinson (1845–1925), American politician, Governor of West Virginia

== Sports ==
- George Atkinson (1900s footballer) (fl. 1904/5), English professional footballer
- George Atkinson (climber) (born 1994), British mountain climber
- George Atkinson (cricketer) (1830–1906), English cricketer
- George Atkinson (Olympic footballer) (1893–1967), represented Great Britain at the 1920 Summer Olympics
- George Atkinson (safety) (1947–2025), American football safety and kick returner
- George Atkinson III (1992–2019), American football running back and kick returner

== Others ==
- George Atkinson (convict) (1764–1834), English convict and member of the First Fleet to Australia
- George Atkinson (businessman) (1935–2005), American businessman and video rental pioneer
- George Francis Atkinson (1854–1918), American botanist and mycologist
- George H. Atkinson (1819–1889), missionary and educator in Oregon, United States
- George Atkinson-Willes (1847–1921), British Admiral, known as George Atkinson prior to 1901

== See also ==
- George Atkins (disambiguation)
