= Mohamed El-Sayed =

Mohamed El-Sayed may refer to:

- Mohamed El-Sayed (Qatari footballer) (born 1987), Qatari footballer
- Mohamed El-Sayed (athlete) (1905–?), Egyptian middle-distance runner
- Mohamed El-Sayed (Egyptian footballer), Egyptian footballer
- Mohamed El-Sayed (field hockey) (born 1981), Egyptian Olympic hockey player
- Mohamed El-Sayed (rower) (born 1924), Egyptian rower
- Mohamed El-Sayed (fencer) (born 2003), Egyptian fencer
- Mohamed Hafez El-Sayed (born 1963), Egyptian Olympic weightlifter
- Mohamed Elsayed (born 1973), Egyptian boxer
- Mohamed El-Sayed Atta (1968-2001), Egyptian terrorist and 9/11 ringleader
- Abdulrahman Mohamed "Abdul" El-Sayed (born 1984), American physician and politician, often called derogatorily by his middle name
- Mohamed El Sayed (footballer, born 2006), Egyptian professional footballer
