= Alfred Roth =

Alfred Roth may refer to:

- Alfred Roth (architect) (1903–1998), Swiss architect and designer
- Alfred Roth (footballer) (1891–1966), French international footballer
- Alfred Roth (politician) (1879–1948), German politician and writer
