= Gösta Nilsson =

Gösta Nilsson may refer to:

- Gösta Stevens (1897–1964), Swedish screenwriter and film director, also known as Gösta Nilsson
- Gösta Nilsson (footballer), Swedish footballer

== See also ==
- Gösta Adrian-Nilsson (1884–1965), Swedish artist and writer
