= Poul Nielsen (disambiguation) =

Poul Nielsen can refer to:

- Poul Nielsen, footballer
- Poul Nielsen (footballer, born 1915)
- Poul Nielsen (footballer, born 1895)
- Poul Erik Nielsen, rower
