= Jean Le Bidois =

French footballer (1898–1927)

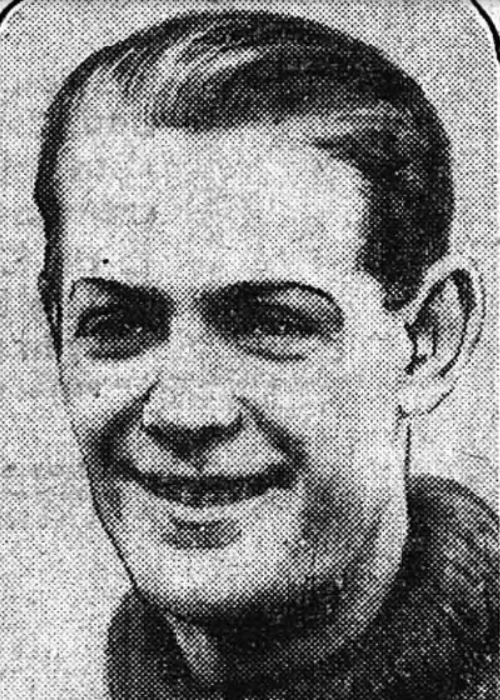
- Jean Le Bidois as portrayed by the French newspaper Le Matin on the day after his death

Personal information
- Date of birth: 25 January 1898
- Place of birth: Dieppe, Normandy, France
- Date of death: 13 March 1927 (aged 28–29)
- Place of death: Paris, France
- Position: Goalkeeper

Senior career*
Years	Team	Apps	(Gls)
1918–1921	Sotteville FC		
1921–1922	FEC Levallois		
1922–1924	FC Cette		
1924–1927	Stade Olympique de l'Est		

International career
1920	France	0	(0)
1921–1927	Paris	5	(0)
- * Club domestic league appearances and goals

Jean Le Bidois (25 January 1898 – 13 March 1927) was a French footballer who played as a goalkeeper, and who was a member of the French squad that competed in the football tournament of the 1920 Olympic Games in Antwerp, but he did not play in any matches. He died as a result of a on-field incident in 1927.

== Playing career ==
Born in Normandy in 1898, Le Bidois began his football career at his hometown club Sotteville FC, where he stood out as a good goalkeeper, being regularly called up for the French national team, including the football tournament of the 1920 Olympic Games in Antwerp, but he did not play in any matches. While carrying out his mandatory military service, he kept goal for the French military team, with whom he toured Yugoslavia in the summer of 1921; however, this tour was more of a diplomatic event than a sporting one, intended to strengthen ties with France's new ally in Southeastern Europe. Despite playing alongside French internationals, such as Paul Nicolas, Raymond Dubly, Jean Boyer, and Eugène Langenove, none of the matches was recognized by FIFA.

In 1921, Le Bidois moved to FEC Levallois, where his good performances earned him not only a call-up for the Paris-London match on 2 November 1921, but also the attention of bigger clubs. He ended up agreeing to join Georges Bayrou's FC Cette, but only in exchange for a large sum, back in a time when professionalism was still forbidden. At the end of the summer of 1922, a member of the FFF board overheard a conversation in which Le Bidois confided to a friend that he was being paid to play for Cette, and as a result, he received a one-year suspension from the federation. Two years later, in 1924, he returned to Paris, where he joined the modest club Stade Olympique de l'Est (SOE), playing the entire 1924–25 season with the reserve team due to not yet having his A license. When interviewed about this period in January 1927, he stated that he had no regrets because it allowed him "to train smoothly and slowly regain my form".

In the 1925–26 season, Le Bidois established himself as SOE's starting goalkeeper, helping his side achieve promotion, but the presence of Maurice Cottenet and Pierre Chayriguès blocked him from finally earning his first official cap for the French team, so he had to settle with the Parisian selection, with whom he played in friendlies against Gipuzkoa, Sud-Ouest, London, and Berlin, with the latter ending in a 1–5 away loss on 20 February 1927, despite a "magnificent match" from Le Bidois. A few days later, on 25 February, the journalist Marcel Rossini dedicated an article to his return, which was published in the French newspaper L'Intransigeant, describing him "as one of our best representatives in Berlin, where he attracted the applause of the crowd as well as the praise of the German critics".

== Death ==
Just two weeks later, on 13 March 1927, while keeping goal for SOE in a season-ending match of the Ligue Île-de-France, the 28-year-old Le Bidois received a violent kick at his carotid artery from Aron Pollitz of US Suisse Paris, losing conscious immediately and then dying in the locker room just five minutes later; the game was called off after the announcement of his death.

His death sparked a debate about the need for goalkeepers to wear protective helmets and a petition was launched to call for a ban on the so-called "goalkeeper charge", the action of jostling the goalkeeper to prevent him from having the ball, which was tolerated by the rules of the time. Following his death, funds were raised for the construction of a memorial, tournaments were organized, and SOE even named its ground after him. His funeral took place five days later, on 18 March, and it was attended by 3,000 people, including Jules Rimet, Henri Delaunay, Nicolas, and Chayriguès.

== See also ==
- List of association footballers who died after on-field incidents
