= Oscar Bongard =

French footballer (1894–?)

Personal information
- Full name: Frédéric Georges Oscar Bongard
- Date of birth: 10 April 1894
- Place of birth: Haguenau, France
- Date of death: unknown
- Place of death: France
- Position: Forward

Senior career*
Years	Team	Apps	(Gls)
1918–1926	Strasbourg		

International career
1920	France	0	(0)

Managerial career
- 1928–1930: Strasbourg
- * Club domestic league appearances and goals

Frédéric Georges Oscar Bongard (10 April 1894 – unknown) was a French footballer who played as a forward for Strasbourg in the 1920s. He was also a member of the French squad that competed in the football tournament of the 1920 Olympic Games in Antwerp, but he did not play in any matches.

== Playing career ==
Oscar Bongard was born in Haguenau, Bas-Rhin, on 10 April 1894, as the son of Oscar Bongard (1872–). When World War I ended, he joined AS Strasbourg, and after a spell with FC Strasbourg 06 in 1922, he returned to ASS in 1925. In 1920, he was called up for the French squad that competed in the football tournament of the 1920 Olympic Games in Antwerp, but he did not play in any matches.

Bongard later coached Strasbourg for two seasons, from 1928 until 1930.
