= George Atkins =

George Atkins is the name of:

- George Atkins (American football) (1932–2015), American football player
- George Atkins (broadcaster) (1917–2009), Canadian broadcaster
- George Atkins (cyclist) (born 1991), British cyclist

== See also ==
- George Atkinson (disambiguation)
