= Gracco De Nardo =

Italian footballer

Personal information
- Date of birth: 24 September 1893
- Place of birth: Terni, Italy
- Date of death: 22 April 1984 (aged 90)
- Place of death: Piedimonte San Germano, Italy
- Position: Defender

Senior career*
Years	Team	Apps	(Gls)
1915–1916	Genoa	0	(0)
1919–1921	Spes Genova	?	(?)
1923–1924	Sampierdarenese	13	(2)

International career
1920–1921	Italy	2	(0)

Managerial career
- 1928–1930: Virtus Entella
- * Club domestic league appearances and goals

Gracco De Nardo (Italian pronunciation: [ˈɡrakko de ˈnardo]; 24 September 1893 – 22 April 1984) was an Italian footballer who played as a defender. He competed for Italy in the men's football tournament at the 1920 Summer Olympics.
