= Theodoros Dimitriou =

Greek footballer

Personal information
- Nationality: Greek
- Born: 1898

Sport
- Sport: Football
- Club: Panionios

Theodoros Dimitriou (Greek: Θεόδωρος Δημητρίου; 1898, date of death unknown) was a Greek football player who played for the club Panionios He was member of the national team for the 1920 Olympic Games in Antwerp.
