= Theodoros Nikolaidis =

Greek footballer

Personal information
- Date of birth: 1891

International career
| Years | Team | Apps | (Gls) |
- Greece

Theodoros Nikolaidis (Greek: Θεόδωρος Νικολαΐδης, born 1891, date of death unknown) was a Greek footballer. He competed in the men's tournament at the 1920 Summer Olympics.
