= Herrgärdets IP =

Football stadium in Västerås, Sweden

Herrgärdets IP was a football stadium in Västerås, Sweden and the former home stadium for the football team Västerås IK and the bandy team Västerås SK. It was built in 1911, in central Västerås, to a cost of 6000 Swedish kronor. It was replaced by Arosvallen in 1931. There's no longer any stadium where Herrgärdets IP used to be.

Two Swedish ice hockey championship finals took place at Herrgärdets IP, 1925 and 1926.
