= George Atkinson (convict) =

English convict sent to Australia

- Born: 1764; England
- Died: 20 June 1834 (aged 69–70); Sydney, Australia
- Spouse: Mary Cockran
- Children: none
- Parent(s): Henry and Alice Atkinson

George Atkinson (1764 – 20 June 1834), also known as George Atkins, was an English convict sent to Australia aboard a ship of the First Fleet. He was a chimney sweeper.

Convicted for the theft of clothing and a book from a London boarding-house in 1783, he was sentenced to seven years' transportation and sent to the Australian penal colony of New South Wales where he was put to work on a Norfolk Island farm. On expiry of his sentence Atkinson married and took up careers in farming, law enforcement and as a mariner. In 1811 he purchased a half-share in a seagoing sloop, becoming one of the colony's earliest ship owners.

Bankrupted within three years, Atkinson resumed to work as a police constable, night watch and labourer. He died in 1834 and was buried near St James' Church, Sydney.

== Life in England ==
Atkinson was born in 1764, the son of Henry and Alice Atkinson in London. His baptism was recorded at St Andrew's, Holborn on 26 August 1764.

On 3 March 1784, the nineteen-year-old Atkinson was caught leaving a boarding house at 40 Shoe Lane in London, carrying a bundle of clothing. An inspection of the bundle revealed it contained a cloth coat, two waistcoats, four pairs of breeches, four shirts, a pair of shoes and stockings, two handkerchiefs and a book, each identified as the property of William Smith, a lodger in the house. Atkinson was held in Newgate Prison until 21 April, when he was brought to trial at the Old Bailey.

According to evidence at the trial, the house at Shoe Lane was owned by Joshua Cook, who lived there with his wife Mary and their servant Susannah Watkins. The garret room was rented to Smith, who had been at home on the day of 3 March 1784. On that day Mr and Mrs Cook, and Susannah Watkins, had all seen Atkinson climbing down from the garret with the bundle of clothing. Not knowing who he was they had challenged him as he descended the stairs and prevented him from leaving the building. Atkinson had claimed he had entered the house seeking a "Mrs Johnson [as] he had a bundle of linen shirts to wash", but none of the witnesses believed this story and he was held until he could be turned over to local authorities. Mary Cook and Susannah Watkins testified at the trial, as did William Smith who identified the clothing and book as belonging to him.

Atkinson offered no defence, his only words being "I have nothing to say." He was found guilty and sentenced to transportation for seven years.

== Penal servitude ==
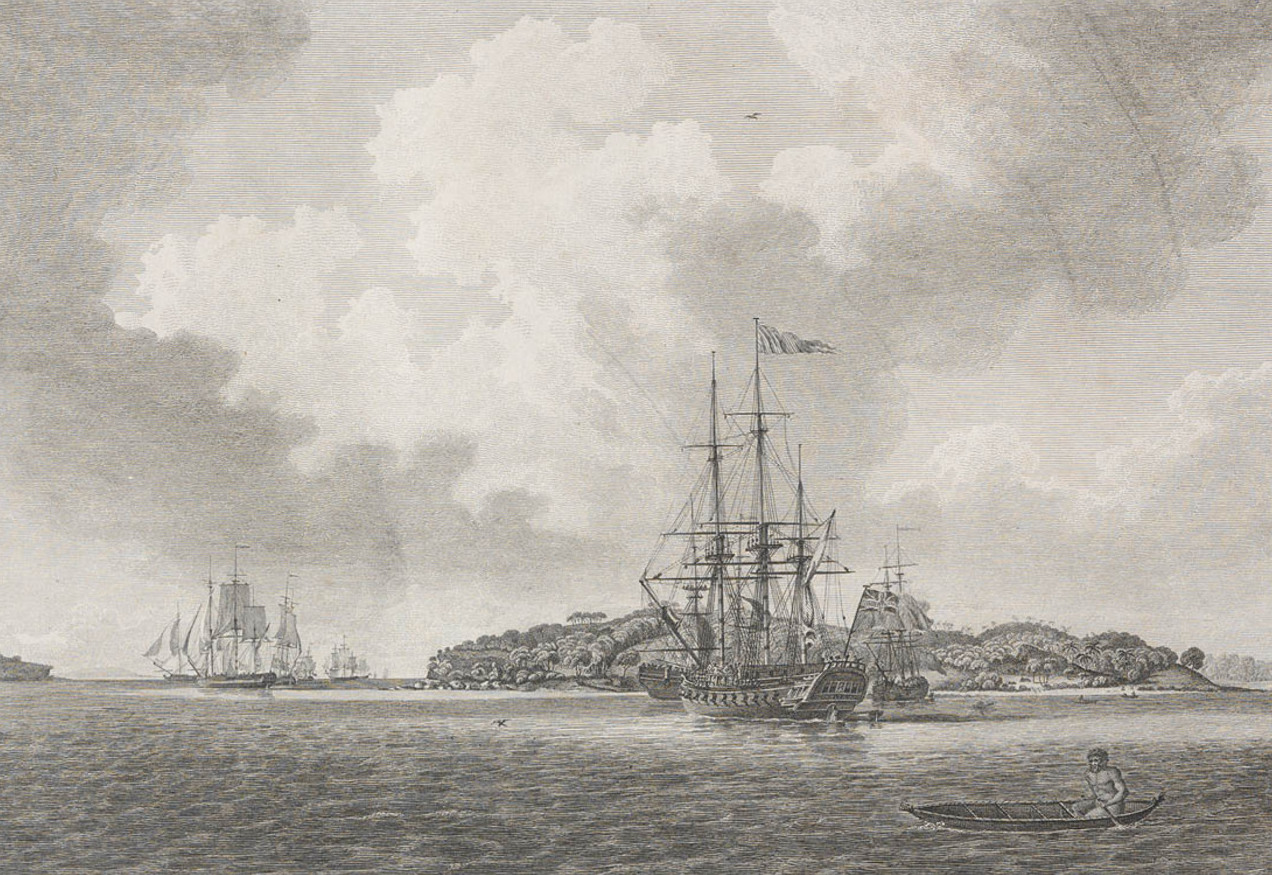
The First Fleet at voyage's end in 1788. Engraving from The Voyage of Governor Phillip to Botany Bay

Penal transportation to the Americas having effectively ceased as a result of the American Revolutionary War, Atkinson spent the next three years confined aboard the prison hulk Censor. On 27 February 1787 he was transferred by wagon to Portsmouth for embarkation on the convict ship Scarborough, part of the First Fleet to New South Wales, Australia. Scarborough commenced her voyage in company with the rest of the Fleet on 13 May, arriving in Port Jackson, New South Wales in January 1788. Atkinson remained in Port Jackson for two years, before being transferred in 1790 to a government farm on Norfolk Island.

== Life as a settler ==
Atkinson's imprisonment expired in 1791, but he remained in Norfolk Island as a farm labourer. In April 1792 he had married fellow convict Mary Cockran (Note: Mary Cockran (born 1755), a clothing dealer from London, sentenced to death in 1786 for stealing calico but reprieved on condition of fourteen years' transportation. Carried to Australia aboard the convict ship Lady Penrhyn, she was held in the colony at Port Jackson for the next four years. In March 1790 she had a son, George, by fellow convict William Tyrell, and in 1792 was transferred to Norfolk Island where she met and married Atkinson. Cockran remained on the Island until at least 1800 when her sentence expired, and thereafter returned to Port Jackson to be with her husband. She died in Sydney in either 1817 or 1818.) and obtained a grant of 10 acres of farmland which he shared with another former prisoner, Thomas Howard. (Note: Thomas Howard, sentenced in 1785 to seven years' transportation for an attempted theft from a London jewellery shop, and for assaulting a police constable.) The farm was a success, and by January 1793 it produced a surplus of grain which Atkinson sold back to the colonial administration.

In March 1793 Atkinson obtained passage to Port Jackson, where he sought work as a seaman. His wife Mary was left behind on Norfolk Island as her fourteen-year sentence had not yet expired.

== Bibliography ==
- Britton, Alex R., ed. (1978). Historical records of New South Wales. Vol. 1, part 2. Phillip, 1783–1792. Lansdown Slattery & Co. p. 56. OCLC 219911274.
- Chapman, Don (1986). 1788: The People of the First Fleet. Cassell Australia. ISBN 0868242659.
- Gillen, Mollie (1989). The Founders of Australia: A Biographical Dictionary of the First Fleet. Library of Australian History. ISBN 0908120699.
