= Kamel Taha =

Egyptian footballer (born 1897)

Personal information
- Date of birth: 1897

Senior career*
Years	Team	Apps	(Gls)
1920-1924	Al Ahly		

International career
1920-1924	Egypt		
- * Club domestic league appearances and goals

Kamel Taha (Arabic: كَامِل طٰهٰ; born 1897, date of death unknown) was an Egyptian footballer. He competed at the 1920 Summer Olympics and the 1924 Summer Olympics.
