= Rinaldo Roggero =

Italian footballer

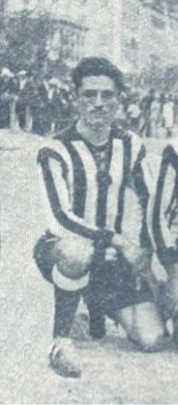

Personal information
- Date of birth: 21 August 1891
- Place of birth: Savona, Italy
- Date of death: 7 July 1966 (aged 74)
- Position: Forward

Senior career*
Years	Team	Apps	(Gls)
1913–1925	Savona	101	(14)

International career
1920	Italy	1	(0)

Managerial career
- 1933–1938: Savona
- 1939–1940: Savona
- 1942–1943: Savona
- 1946–1947: Savona
- * Club domestic league appearances and goals

Rinaldo Roggero (Italian pronunciation: [riˈnaldo rodˈdʒɛːro]; 21 August 1891 – 7 July 1966) was an Italian footballer who played as a forward. He competed for Italy in the men's football tournament at the 1920 Summer Olympics.
