= Arthur Leesch =

Luxembourgish footballer

Personal information
- Date of birth: 23 January 1894
- Place of birth: Chenoa, Illinois, United States
- Date of death: 1955 (aged 60–61)
- Place of death: Luxembourg, Luxembourg

International career
| Years | Team | Apps | (Gls) |
- Luxembourg

Arthur Leesch (23 January 1894 – 1955) was a Luxembourgish footballer. He competed in the men's tournament at the 1920 Summer Olympics.
