= Gösta Wihlborg =

Swedish footballer (1898–1968)

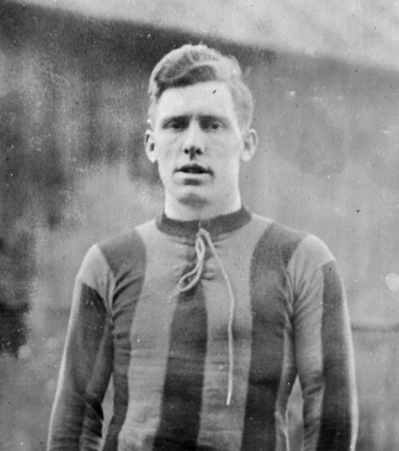
- Wihlborg with Hammarby IF in 1922.

Personal information
- Full name: Nils Gösta Wihlborg
- Date of birth: 19 February 1898
- Place of birth: Stockholm, Sweden
- Date of death: 28 November 1968 (aged 70)
- Place of death: United States
- Position: Defender

Youth career
- Klara SK

Senior career*
Years	Team	Apps	(Gls)
1915–1924	Hammarby IF	84	(6)
Total		84	(6)

International career
1919–1923	Sweden	7	(0)
- * Club domestic league appearances and goals

Gösta "Pysen" Wihlborg (19 February 1898 – 28 November 1968) was a Swedish-American football player, best known for representing Hammarby IF. A full international between 1919 and 1923, he won 7 caps for the Sweden national team.

== Club career ==
=== Hammarby IF ===
In 1915, Hammarby IF established a football section after a merger with Klara SK, where Wihlborg had started to play as a youngster. On 15 August the same year, Wihlborg scored in the club's first ever football match, in a 5–0 home win against Västerås SK.

Wihlborg soon established himself as one of Hammarby's key players, together with goalkeeper Victor Olsson and striker Gustav Björk. In 1921, Hammarby debuted in the Svenska Serien, by then the highest league in Swedish football. He played 15 competitive games throughout the season, as the club finished third in the table, three points behind winners Örgryte.

In 1922, Hammarby had an other strong showing where they went to the finals of Svenska Mästerskapet, a cup by then held to decide the Swedish champion, losing 1–3 to GAIS in a game where Wihlborg captained his side.

In the summer of 1924, Wihlborg emigrated to the United States at age 26, thus effectively ending his football career.

== International career ==
Wihlborg was one of the first players from Hammarby IF to establish himself as a member of the Sweden national team, and debuted in a 3–3 friendly draw away at Finland on 28 September 1919. In total, he won 7 caps for his country up until 1923.

== Works cited ==
- Persson, Gunnar (1996). Hammarby IF: En klubbhistoria 1897–1997 (in Swedish). Strömbergs Bokförlag. ISBN 91-7151-097-4.
