= John Payne (footballer, born 1889) =

English footballer

Personal information
- Full name: James Esdon Payne
- Date of birth: 3 December 1889
- Place of birth: Camberwell, England
- Date of death: 28 August 1942 (aged 52)
- Place of death: Leytonstone, England
- Position: Defender

Senior career*
Years	Team	Apps	(Gls)
–1924	Leytonstone		

International career
1920–1921	England Amateurs	3	(0)
- * Club domestic league appearances and goals

John Payne (3 December 1889 – 28 August 1942) was an English amateur footballer who played as a defender for Leytonstone. He was capped by England at amateur level and was a part of the Great Britain at the 1920 Summer Olympics, but did not make an appearance.

== Personal life ==
Payne served as a sergeant in the Training Reserve during the First World War.
