= FK Union Žižkov =

Union Žižkov
- Full name: FK Union Žižkov, z.s.
- Founded: 1907
- Ground: Fotbalové hřiště Vítkov; Pražačka; Prague 3 – Žižkov
- Chairman: Stanislav Křivánek
- League: III. třída skupina B – Praha (level 9)
- 2025–26: 5th

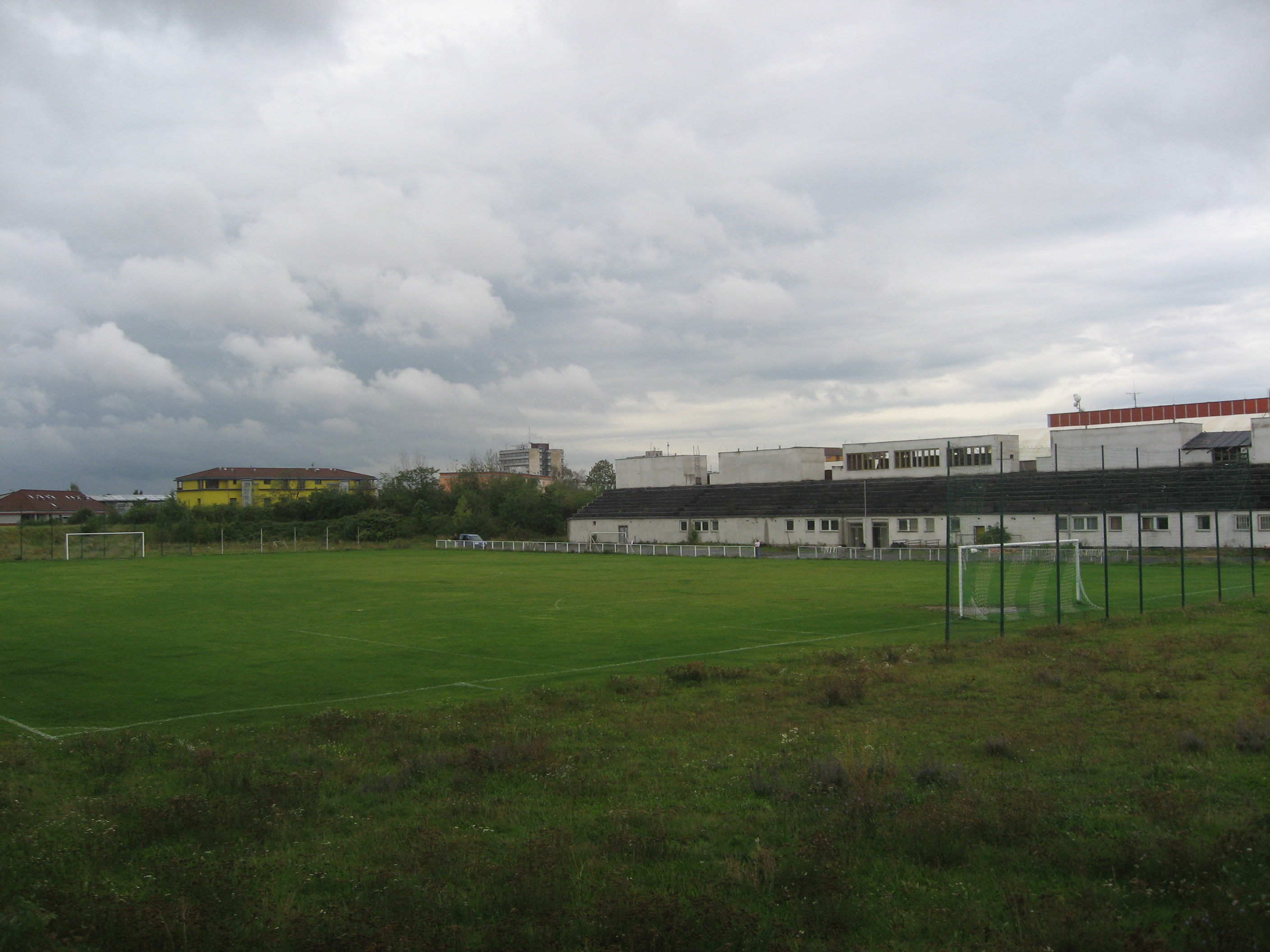
Football field of the club

FK Union Žižkov is a football club in the Czech Republic. It was founded in 1907 in the town of Žižkov, which is now a district of Prague.

== Historical names ==
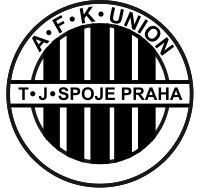
Former club logo

- AFK Union Žižkov (1907–?)
- ASK Union Žižkov (?–1948)
- Sokol Union Žižkov (1948–1950)
- Sokol Žižkov B (1950–1952)
- ZSJ Pošta Žižkov (1952–1953)
- TJ Dynamo Žižkov Spoje (1953–?)
- TJ Spoje Žižkov
- TJ Union Žižkov
- AFK Union Žižkov
- FK Union Žižkov (2021–present)
