= Erich Graff-Wang =

Norwegian footballer (1902-1969)

Personal information
- Date of birth: 15 October 1902
- Date of death: 26 June 1969 (aged 66)
- Position: Forward

International career
Years	Team	Apps	(Gls)
1924	Norway	2	(0)

Erich Graff-Wang (15 October 1902 – 26 June 1969) was a Norwegian footballer. He played in two matches for the Norway national football team in 1924. He was also part of Norway's squad for the football tournament at the 1920 Summer Olympics, but he did not play in any matches.
