= Fridtjof Resberg =

Norwegian footballer (1895-1983)

Personal information
- Date of birth: 12 November 1895
- Date of death: 21 October 1983 (aged 87)

International career
Years	Team	Apps	(Gls)
1921–1922	Norway	2	(0)

Fridtjof Resberg (12 November 1895 – 21 October 1983) was a Norwegian footballer. He played in two matches for the Norway national football team in 1921 to 1922.
