= Tinus van Beurden =

Dutch footballer

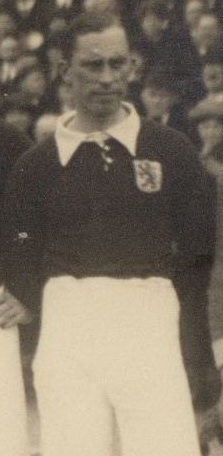
- Tinus van Beurden in 1920

Personal information
- Date of birth: 30 April 1893
- Place of birth: Tilburg, Netherlands
- Date of death: 29 June 1950 (aged 57)
- Place of death: Oisterwijk, Netherlands

Senior career*
| Years | Team | Apps | (Gls) |
| 1910–1926 | Willem II | 126 | (47) |

International career
| 1920 | Netherlands | 1 | (0) |
- * Club domestic league appearances and goals

Tinus van Beurden (30 April 1893 – 29 June 1950) was a Dutch footballer. He played in one match for the Netherlands national football team in 1920, and thereby became the first Willem II player to gain an international cap.

Van Beurden played for Willem II between 1910 and 1926, making 126 appearances and scoring 47 goals. In the 1915–16 season, he was part of the Willem II team to win the Dutch league title as first team outside of the Randstad region.

== Honours ==
Willem II

- Netherlands Football League Championship: 1915–16
