= Thomas Schmit =

Luxembourgish footballer

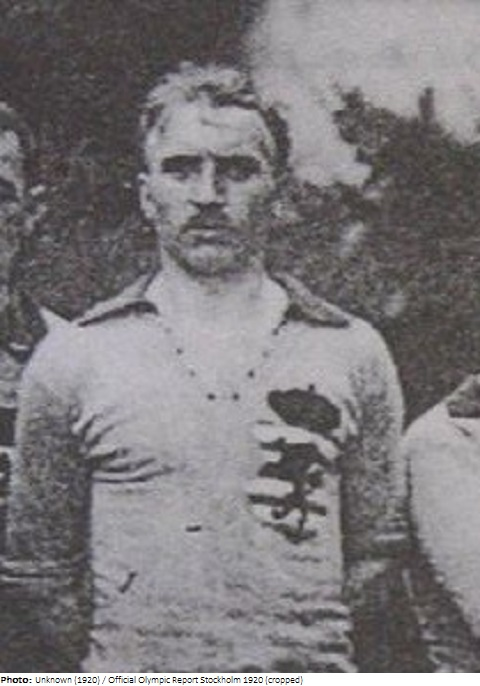

Personal information
- Date of birth: 26 April 1895
- Place of birth: Luxembourg, Luxembourg
- Date of death: 9 August 1944 (aged 49)
- Place of death: Luxembourg, Luxembourg

International career
| Years | Team | Apps | (Gls) |
- Luxembourg

Thomas Schmit (26 April 1895 – 9 August 1944) was a Luxembourgish footballer. He competed in the men's tournament at the 1920 Summer Olympics.
