= Camille Schumacher =

Luxembourgish footballer

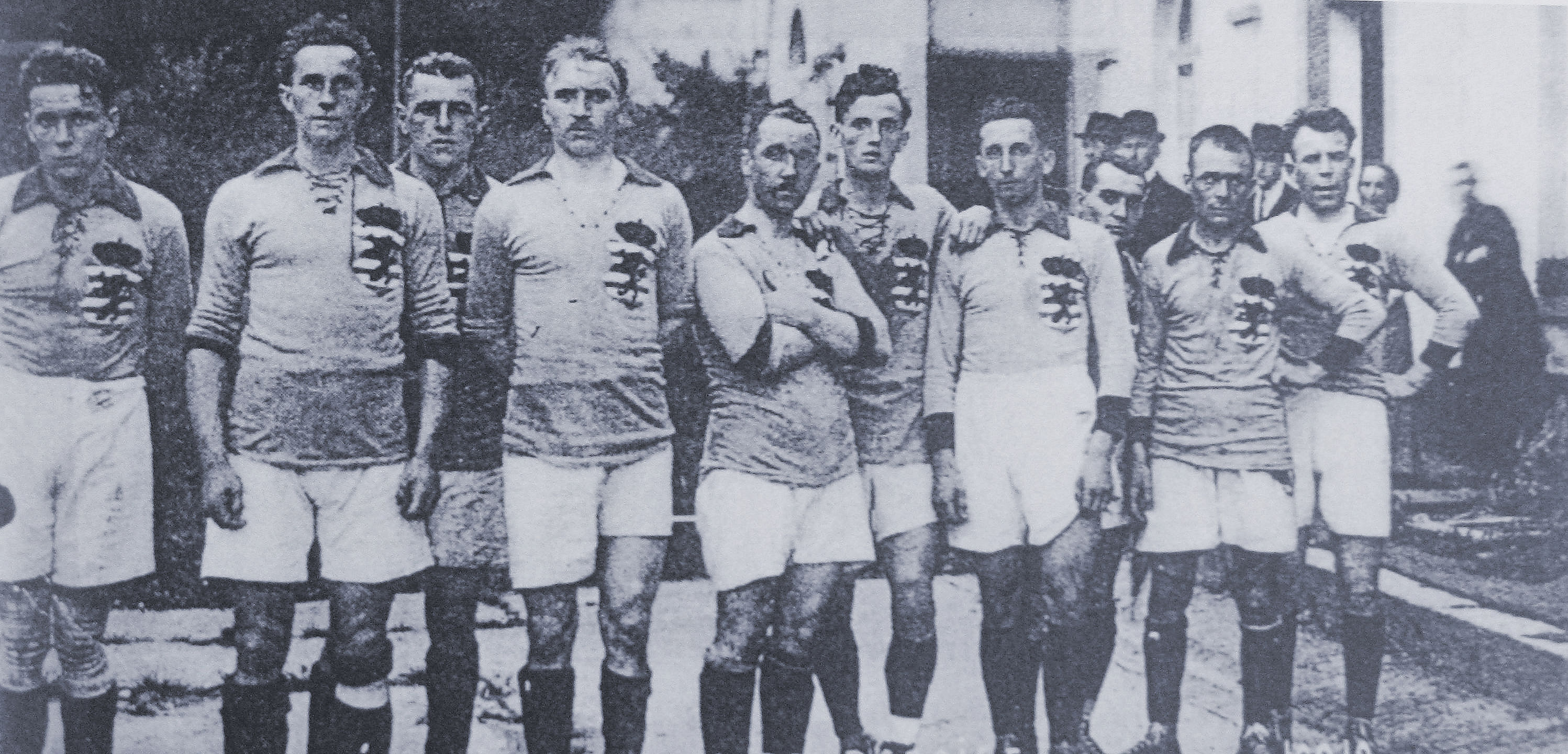
- The Luxembourg national team at the 1920 Games. Schumacher is second from right.

Personal information
- Date of birth: 6 May 1896
- Place of birth: Esch-sur-Alzette, Luxembourg
- Date of death: 3 August 1977 (aged 81)
- Place of death: Esch-sur-Alzette, Luxembourg

International career
Years	Team	Apps	(Gls)
- Luxembourg

Camille Schumacher (6 May 1896 – 3 August 1977) was a Luxembourgish footballer. He competed in the men's tournament at the 1920 Summer Olympics.
