= Riadh Shawki =

Egyptian footballer (1893–1943)

Personal information
- Date of birth: 1893
- Date of death: 16 October 1943 (aged 49–50)

Senior career*
Years	Team	Apps	(Gls)
1920-1924	Al Ahly		

International career
1920-1924	Egypt		
- * Club domestic league appearances and goals

Riadh Shawki (1893 – 16 October 1943) was an Egyptian footballer. He competed at the 1920 Summer Olympics and the 1924 Summer Olympics.
