= George Mounsey Wheatley Atkinson =

Irish painter

Captain George Mounsey Wheatley Atkinson
- Born: 1806; Cobh, Ireland
- Died: January 7, 1884 (aged 77–78); Cobh, Ireland
- Known for: Maritime paintings
- Children: George Mounsey Atkinson Jr. (painter), Richard Peterson Atkinson (painter), Sarah Atkinson Dobbs (painter)

George Mounsey Wheatley Atkinson (1806 – 1884) was an Irish marine painter known for his depictions of Cork Harbour and various ships.

== Early life ==
Atkinson was born to English parents in Cove (now Cobh), County Cork, Ireland, in 1806. He trained as a carpenter.

== Career ==
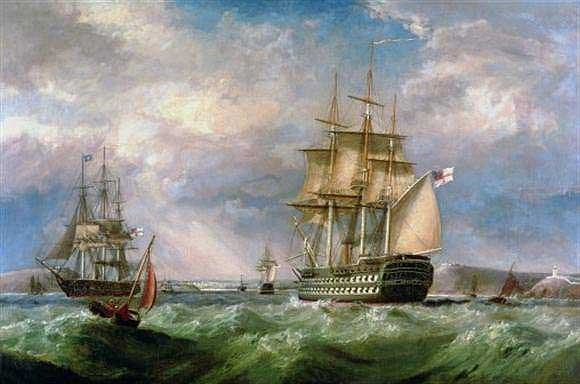
British Men-o'-war Sailing Into Cork Harbour in choppy seas by George Mounsey Wheatley Atkinson

Atkinson worked at sea for several years as a ship's carpenter, then at Cork Harbour as a Marine and Customs official. He became a self-taught artist in his mid-thirties. His working background gave him a unique understanding of the ships and marine activity that would feature prominently in his paintings, which often depicted detailed and accurate scenes from the harbour. His artworks were first displayed in 1841 at the first ever exhibition of the Cork Art Union.

== Legacy ==
His paintings were reproduced as lithographs by W. Scraggs of Cork and Atkinson's son George Mounsey Atkinson. His works have also become important historical documentation of Cork in the 19th century. Atkinson's paintings are held in various collections, including the Crawford Art Gallery in Cork.

== Personal life and death ==
Atkinson had three sons and a daughter, three of whom also became successful artists. His oldest son, the junior George Mounsey Wheatley Atkinson (c.1830, Cobh – 1908, London), was additionally an art examiner at South Kensington Museum and a published archaeologist.

Atkinson died at his home in Cobh on 7 January 1884.
