= Vidar Stenborg =

Swedish footballer

- Stenborg in 1920

Personal information
- Date of birth: 21 May 1894
- Place of birth: Eskilstuna, Sweden
- Date of death: 30 July 1960 (aged 66)
- Place of death: Eskilstuna, Sweden
- Position: Defender

Senior career*
Years	Team	Apps	(Gls)
- IFK Eskilstuna

International career
1917–1921	Sweden	2	(0)
- * Club domestic league appearances and goals

Vidar Stenborg (21 May 1894 – 30 July 1960) was a Swedish footballer who played as a defender. He made two appearances for the Sweden national team and was a part of Sweden's 1920 Summer Olympics squad. He won the 1921 Swedish Championship with IFK Eskilstuna.

== Honours ==
IFK Eskilstuna

- Swedish Champion: 1921
