= Jan Plaček =

Czech footballer (1894–1957)

Personal information
- Date of birth: 5 October 1894
- Place of birth: Prague, Austria-Hungary
- Date of death: 18 December 1957 (aged 63)

International career
Years	Team	Apps	(Gls)
1920	Czechoslovakia	1	(0)

Jan Plaček (5 October 1894 – 18 December 1957) was a Czechoslovak footballer. He competed in the men's tournament at the 1920 Summer Olympics. On a club level, he played for AC Sparta Prague.
