= Georgios Chatziandreou =

Greek footballer

Personal information
- Date of birth: 1899

International career
| Years | Team | Apps | (Gls) |
- Greece

Georgios Chatziandreou (Greek: Γεώργιος Χατζηανδρέου; born 1899, date of death unknown) was a Greek footballer. He competed in the men's tournament at the 1920 Summer Olympics.
