= Basil Gates =

English footballer

Personal information
- Full name: Basil Hibble Gates
- Date of birth: 10 May 1896
- Place of birth: Fareham, England
- Date of death: 7 January 1974 (aged 77)
- Place of death: Margate, Kent
- Position: Right-back

Senior career*
| Years | Team | Apps | (Gls) |
| 1924–1925 | Southend United | 1 | (0) |

International career
| 1919–1921 | Great Britain/England amateur | 6 | (0) |
- * Club domestic league appearances and goals

Basil Gates (10 May 1896 – 7 January 1974) was an English footballer.

== Career ==
Gates served in the Army from 1915 to 1918, becoming Army champion at the 110, 220, and 440 yards in 1917, and on demobilization joined the London Caledonians; although English-born, Gates' mother was Scottish, entitling him to be a member of the Caledonians. He was a member of the Great Britain men's Olympic football team in 1920 (playing in the defeat to Norway) and was named captain of the England amateur side in 1921.

He was an FA Amateur Cup winner with the Caledonians in 1922–23. He also played once in the Football League, for Southend United at Aberdare Athletic in 1924–25 - unfortunately he put through his own goal to open the scoring in a 3–0 defeat.

Gates was known for an unorthodox approach, often breaking free from rigid positional systems and using his lightning pace (he was timed at 10.4 seconds in the 100 yards) to anticipate attacks and prevent through balls.
