= George Atkinson (1900s footballer) =

English footballer

Personal information
- Place of birth: Appleby-in-Westmorland, England
- Position: Winger

Senior career*
Years	Team	Apps	(Gls)
1904–1905	Burnley	14	(0)
- * Club domestic league appearances and goals

George Atkinson (fl. 1904–1905) was an English professional footballer who played as a winger.

Atkinson joined Football League Second Division club Burnley in the summer of 1904 and made his debut for the club in the first match of the 1904–05 season, a 1–4 defeat to West Bromwich Albion on 3 September 1904. He appeared in all of the team's first 14 games of the campaign, with his final match coming on 19 November 1904 against Glossop. Atkinson then failed to report for the following fixture away at Chesterfield, leaving the team to play with only 10 men. He was never again selected for Burnley and left the club in 1905.
