= Jean Massard =

Luxembourgish footballer

Personal information
- Date of birth: 17 September 1894
- Place of birth: Luxembourg City, Luxembourg
- Date of death: 3 February 1930 (aged 35)
- Place of death: Luxembourg City, Luxembourg

International career
Years	Team	Apps	(Gls)
- Luxembourg

Jean Massard (17 September 1894 – 3 February 1930) was a Luxembourgish footballer. He competed in the men's tournament at the 1920 Summer Olympics.
