= Alfred Roth (footballer) =

French footballer (1891-1966)

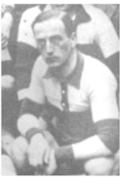
- Roth in 1922

Personal information
- Date of birth: 17 August 1891
- Date of death: 4 September 1966 (aged 75)

International career
Years	Team	Apps	(Gls)
1920	France	1	(0)

Alfred Roth (17 August 1891 – 4 September 1966) was a French footballer. He played in one for the France national football team in 1920.
