= George Atkinson (Olympic footballer) =

English footballer

Personal information
- Full name: George Thomas Atkinson
- Date of birth: 3 September 1893
- Place of birth: West Auckland, England
- Date of death: 29 May 1967 (aged 73)
- Place of death: Bishop Auckland, England

Senior career*
Years	Team	Apps	(Gls)
- Bishop Auckland

International career
1920	Great Britain	1	(0)
- * Club domestic league appearances and goals

George Thomas Atkinson (3 September 1893 – 29 May 1967) was an English footballer who represented Great Britain as a center half at the 1920 Summer Olympics. He also played for Bishop Auckland throughout his career.
