= Helmer Edlund =

Swedish footballer

Personal information
- Full name: Karl Erik Helmer Edlund
- Date of birth: 17 September 1900
- Place of birth: Norrköping, Sweden
- Date of death: 29 August 1977 (aged 76)
- Place of death: Norrköping, Sweden
- Position: Forward

Senior career*
Years	Team	Apps	(Gls)
- Sleipner

International career
1920–1922	Sweden	3	(3)
- * Club domestic league appearances and goals

Karl Erik Helmer Edlund (17 September 1900 – 29 August 1977) was a Swedish footballer who played as a forward for Sleipner. He featured three times for the Sweden national team between 1920 and 1922, scoring three goals.

== Career statistics ==
=== International ===
Appearances and goals by national team and year
National team	Year	Apps	Goals
Sweden	1920	1	0
Sweden	1921	1	1
Sweden	1922	1	2
Total		3	3

Scores and results list Sweden's goal tally first, score column indicates score after each Edlund goal.

List of international goals scored by Helmer Edlund
No.	Date	Venue	Opponent	Score	Result	Competition
1	13 November 1921	Letenský Stadion, Prague, Czechoslovakia	Czechoslovakia	2–2	2–2	Friendly
2	5 June 1922	Töölön Pallokenttä, Helsinki, Finland	Finland	1–0	4–1	Friendly
3	5 June 1922	Töölön Pallokenttä, Helsinki, Finland	Finland	3–1	4–1	Friendly
