= Victor Olsson (footballer) =

Swedish footballer (1895–1982)

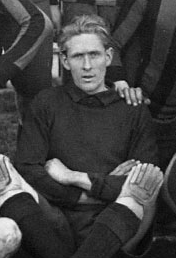
- Olsson in 1921.

Personal information
- Full name: Bror Victor Olsson
- Date of birth: 21 February 1895
- Place of birth: Stockholm, Sweden
- Date of death: 24 January 1982 (aged 86)
- Place of death: Stockholm, Sweden
- Position: Goalkeeper

Senior career*
Years	Team	Apps	(Gls)
1910–1915	Klara SK		
1915–1927	Hammarby IF	93	(0)

International career
1920–1921	Sweden	4	(0)
- * Club domestic league appearances and goals

Victor "Kucku" Olsson (21 February 1895 – 24 January 1982) was a Swedish football player, best known for representing Hammarby IF. A full international between 1920 and 1921, he won four caps for the Sweden national team.

== Club career ==
=== Hammarby IF ===
In 1915, Hammarby IF established a football section after a merger with Klara SK, where 20-year old Olsson had started to play as a youngster. Olsson soon established himself as one of Hammarby's key players, together with defender Gösta Wihlborg and striker Gustav Björk. In 1920, Hammarby debuted in the Svenska Serien, by then the highest league in Swedish football. He played 15 competitive games throughout the season, as the club finished third in the table, three points behind winners Örgryte.

In 1922, Hammarby had an other strong showing where they went to the finals of Svenska Mästerskapet, losing 1–3 to GAIS, a game that Olsson missed due to sickness.

Hammarby IF was one of the founding members of Allsvenskan in 1924, a new league that was established to determine the Swedish Champions. By this time, 29-year old Olsson had lost his place as the starting goalkeeper, to Rickard Westling, and he only played four games throughout the season.

Olsson was the youth idol of Sven Bergqvist, that later would become a goalkeeper for both Hammarby and Sweden, who frequently acted as a ball boy during home games on Hammarby IP.

== International career ==
Olsson was one of the first players from Hammarby IF to establish himself as a member of the Sweden national team. He won four caps for his country between 1920 and 1921.

== Works cited ==
- Persson, Gunnar (1996). Hammarby IF: En klubbhistoria 1897–1997 (in Swedish). Strömbergs Bokförlag. ISBN 91-7151-097-4.
