= Gösta Nilsson (footballer) =

Swedish footballer

Personal information
- Full name: Gösta Nilsson
- Position: Forward

Senior career*
Years	Team	Apps	(Gls)
1926–1932	Malmö FF	65	(20)
- * Club domestic league appearances and goals

Gösta Nilsson was a Swedish footballer who played as a forward.
