= John Torstensson =

Swedish footballer

Personal information
- Full name: John Torstensson
- Date of birth: 5 October 1896
- Date of death: 10 August 1972 (aged 75)
- Position: Defender

Senior career*
Years	Team	Apps	(Gls)
1920–1931	Malmö FF	128	(21)

International career
1921	Sweden	1	(0)
- * Club domestic league appearances and goals

John Torstensson (5 October 1896 – 10 August 1972) was a Swedish footballer who played as a defender. He was also part of Sweden's squad for the football tournament at the 1920 Summer Olympics, but he did not play in any matches.
