= Gustav Björk =

Swedish footballer (1900–1928)

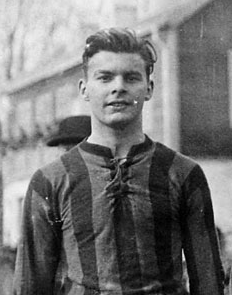
- Björk in 1923.

Personal information
- Full name: Gustav William Björk
- Date of birth: 10 July 1900
- Place of birth: Stockholm, Sweden
- Date of death: 12 May 1928 (aged 27)
- Place of death: Stockholm, Sweden
- Position: Forward

Senior career*
Years	Team	Apps	(Gls)
1916–1925	Hammarby IF	150	(88)
Total		150	(88)

International career
1921	Sweden	2	(0)
- * Club domestic league appearances and goals

Gustav "Måsen" Björk (10 July 1900 – 12 May 1928) was a Swedish football player, best known for being a prolific goalscorer for Hammarby IF. In 1921, he won two caps for the Sweden men's national football team.

== Athletic career ==
=== Football ===
In 1916, at age 16, Björk was promoted to the senior squad of Hammarby IF. Björk soon became known as a prolific goalscorer and established himself as one of Hammarby's key players, together with goalkeeper Victor Olsson and defender Gösta Wihlborg.

In 1920, Hammarby debuted in the Svenska Serien, by then the highest league in Swedish football. The club finished third in the table, three points behind winners Örgryte. The same year, Björk won two caps for the Sweden men's national football team, featuring in two 0–3 losses against Norway and Finland

In 1922, Hammarby had another strong showing where they went to the finals of Svenska Mästerskapet, a cup by then held to decide the Swedish champion, losing 1–3 to GAIS in a game where Björk scored the consolation goal.

In 1924, Hammarby IF was one of the founding members of Allsvenskan, a new league that was established to determine the Swedish champion. He was forced to retire from football in 1925 due to suffering from diabetes.

=== Other sports ===
Like many footballers at the time, Björk also played bandy with Hammarby IF between 1918 and 1925.

In 1921, the club founded their ice hockey department, and on 7 March the same year, Björk became the very first goalscorer for Hammarby IF in a 7–5 win against IF Linnéa. He was part of their roster for two seasons in total.

== Personal life ==
Björk died on 12 May 1928, aged 27, due to appendicitis.

== Works cited ==
- Persson, Gunnar (1996). Hammarby IF: En klubbhistoria 1897–1997 (in Swedish). Strömbergs Bokförlag. ISBN 91-7151-097-4.
