= Mohamed El-Sayed (Egyptian footballer) =

Egyptian footballer

Senior career*
Years	Team	Apps	(Gls)
- El Sekka El Hadid

International career
1920	Egypt		
- * Club domestic league appearances and goals

Mohamed El-Sayed was an Egyptian footballer. He competed in the men's tournament at the 1920 Summer Olympics.
