= Poul Nielsen (footballer, born 1895) =

Danish footballer (1895–1970)

Personal information
- Date of birth: 17 June 1895
- Date of death: 12 February 1970 (aged 74)
- Position: Forward

International career
Years	Team	Apps	(Gls)
1917–1921	Denmark	2	(3)

Poul Nielsen (17 June 1895 – 12 February 1970) was a Danish footballer. He played in two matches for the Denmark national football team from 1917 to 1921. He was also part of Denmark's squad for the football tournament at the 1920 Summer Olympics, but he did not play in any matches.
