= Sune Andersson (footballer, born 1898) =

Swedish footballer (1898–1981)

Personal information
- Full name: Sune Andersson
- Date of birth: 21 April 1898
- Date of death: 8 March 1981 (aged 82)
- Position: Forward

Youth career
- Bellevue IK

Senior career*
Years	Team	Apps	(Gls)
–1917	IF Olympia		
1918–1919	Djurgårdens IF		
1920–1921	IF Olympia		
1921–1931	Djurgårdens IF		

International career
1920–1921	Sweden	3	(1)
- * Club domestic league appearances and goals

Sune Andersson (21 April 1898 — 8 March 1981) was a Swedish footballer and ice hockey player. As a footballer, he made three appearances for Sweden and three Allsvenskan appearances for Djurgårdens IF. Andersson appeared in the 1919 Svenska Mästerskapet Final for Djurgården, which they lost to GAIS.

As an ice hockey player, Sune Andersson was part of Djurgårdens IF's Swedish national ice hockey championship-winning team of 1926.
