= Albert Öijermark =

Swedish footballer

Personal information
- Full name: Albert Öijermark
- Date of birth: 16 February 1900
- Date of death: 9 July 1970 (aged 70)
- Position: Midfielder

Senior career*
| Years | Team | Apps | (Gls) |
| –1925 | Djurgårdens IF | | |
| 1926– | Kalmar IS | | |

International career
| 1920–1921 | Sweden | 4 | (0) |
- * Club domestic league appearances and goals

Albert Öijermark (16 February 1900 — 9 July 1970) was a Swedish Olympic footballer. He made four appearances for Sweden national team.

== Honours ==
=== Club ===
Djurgårdens IF

- Svenska Mästerskapet: 1920
