= Albert Olsson (footballer) =

Swedish footballer

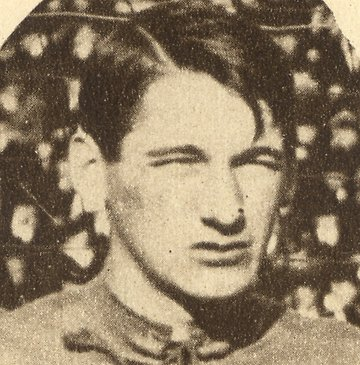
- Olsson, circa 1920

Personal information
- Full name: Albert Julius Olsson
- Date of birth: 28 November 1896
- Place of birth: Gothenburg, Sweden
- Date of death: 20 October 1977 (aged 80)
- Place of death: Gothenburg, Sweden
- Position: Forward

Senior career*
Years	Team	Apps	(Gls)
1919–1928	GAIS		

International career
1919–1927	Sweden	10	(5)
- * Club domestic league appearances and goals

Albert Olsson (28 November 1896 – 20 October 1977) was a Swedish footballer who played as a forward for GAIS. He competed for Team Sweden in the men's tournament at the 1920 Summer Olympics.
