= 1980 Djurgårdens IF season =

Djurgården
1980 season
- Manager: Arve Mokkelbost
- Stadium: Stockholm Olympic Stadium
- Allsvenskan: 12th
- Svenska Cupen: Semi-finals
- Top goalscorer: League: Anders Grönhagen & Hans Holmqvist (5)
- Highest home attendance: 24,663 (17 September vs Hammarby IF, Allsvenskan)
- Lowest home attendance: 356 (8 October vs IF Elfsborg, Svenska Cupen)
- Average home league attendance: 5,438

The 1980 season was Djurgårdens IF's 80th in existence, their 35th season in Allsvenskan and their 19th consecutive season in the league. They were competing in Allsvenskan, 1979–80 Svenska Cupen, and 1980–81 Svenska Cupen.

== Player statistics ==
Appearances for competitive matches only.

No.	Pos	Nat	Player	Total		Allsvenskan		1979–80 Svenska Cupen 1980–81 Svenska Cupen	
No.	Pos	Nat	Player	Apps	Goals	Apps	Goals	Apps	Goals
		(Sweden) SWE	Björn Alkeby	26	0	26	0		
		(Sweden) SWE	Ronald Åman	24	0	24	0		
		(Sweden) SWE	Tommy Berggren	24	4	24	4		
		(Sweden) SWE	Roger Casslind	19	1	19	1		
		(Sweden) SWE	Tommy Davidsson	21	0	21	0		
		(Sweden) SWE	Anders Grönhagen	17	5	17	5		
		(Sweden) SWE	Thomas Hanzon	12	0	12	0		
		(Sweden) SWE	Hans Holmqvist	16	5	16	5		
		(Sweden) SWE	Birger Jacobsson	19	0	19	0		
		(Sweden) SWE	Björn Jansson	9	0	9	0		
		(Sweden) SWE	Vito Knezevic	20	1	20	1		
		(Sweden) SWE	Mika Leinonen	11	0	11	0		
		(Sweden) SWE	Ingemar Lindevall	6	0	6	0		
		(Sweden) SWE	Sven Lindman	10	2	10	2		
		(Sweden) SWE	Lars Sandberg	26	1	26	1		
		(Sweden) SWE	Håkan Stenbäck	24	4	24	4		
		(Sweden) SWE	Lars Stenbäck	25	0	25	0		
		(West Germany) FRG	Volker Tönsfeldt	7	0	7	0		
		(Sweden) SWE	Christer Willborg	10	0	10	0		
		(England) ENG	Gary Williams	10	0	10	0		

=== Goals ===
==== Allsvenskan ====
Name	Goals
(Sweden) Anders Grönhagen	5
(Sweden) Hans Holmqvist	5
(Sweden) Tommy Berggren	4
(Sweden) Håkan Stenbäck	4
(Sweden) Sven Lindman	2
(Sweden) Roger Casslind	1
(Sweden) Vito Knezevic	1
(Sweden) Lars Sandberg	1
own goal	1

== Competitions ==
=== Allsvenskan ===
==== League table ====
Pos	Team	Pld	W	D	L	GF	GA	GD	Pts	Qualification or relegation
10	IFK Norrköping	26	7	8	11	25	39	−14	22	
11	Åtvidabergs FF	26	5	11	10	29	37	−8	21	
12	Djurgårdens IF	26	7	7	12	24	37	−13	21	
13	Landskrona BoIS (R)	26	5	7	14	26	46	−20	17	Relegation to Division 2
14	Mjällby AIF (R)	26	3	5	18	18	47	−29	11	Relegation to Division 2

Rules for classification: 1) points; 2) goal difference; 3) number of goals scored.
(R) Relegated

==== Matches ====
13 April 1980	Halmstads BK	0 – 1	Djurgårdens IF

20 April 1980	Djurgårdens IF	0 – 1	IFK Göteborg

24 April 1980	Östers IF	2 – 0	Djurgårdens IF

3 May 1980	Djurgårdens IF	1 – 1	Landskrona BoIS

11 May 1980	Åtvidabergs FF	0 – 1	Djurgårdens IF

18 May 1980	Djurgårdens IF	0 – 2	Kalmar FF

26 May 1980	Malmö FF	3 – 0	Djurgårdens IF

29 May 1980	Djurgårdens IF	1 – 3	Mjällby AIF

5 June 1980	Hammarby IF	1 – 1	Djurgårdens IF

8 June 1980	Djurgårdens IF	2 – 1	IK Brage

11 June 1980	Djurgårdens IF	5 – 0	IFK Norrköping

29 June 1980	IFK Sundsvall	2 – 1	Djurgårdens IF

2 July 1980	IF Elfsborg	1 – 1	Djurgårdens IF

9 July 1980	Djurgårdens IF	0 – 2	IF Elfsborg

3 August 1980	Landskrona BoIS	1 – 1	Djurgårdens IF

10 August 1980	Djurgårdens IF	2 – 1	Östers IF

14 August 1980	Mjällby AIF	2 – 2	Djurgårdens IF

17 August 1980	Djurgårdens IF	0 – 0	Malmö FF

3 September 1980	IK Brage	2 – 0	Djurgårdens IF

14 September 1980	IFK Norrköping	4 – 0	Djurgårdens IF

17 September 1980	Djurgårdens IF	2 – 1	Hammarby IF	Solna
	Stenbäck 5'; Holmqvist 21'	Report	Ohlsson 51'	Stadium: Råsunda Stadium; Attendance: 24,663; Referee: Efon Ask

21 September 1980	Djurgårdens IF	2 – 2	IFK Sundsvall

28 September 1980	Djurgårdens IF	1 – 0	Åtvidabergs FF

5 October 1980	Kalmar FF	2 – 0	Djurgårdens IF

19 October 1980	Djurgårdens IF	0 – 2	Halmstads BK

26 October 1980	IFK Göteborg	1 – 0	Djurgårdens IF

=== Svenska Cupen ===
==== 1979–80 ====
7 April 1980 Quarter-finals	Djurgårdens IF	2 – 1	IFK Göteborg

15 May 1980 Semi-finals	Djurgårdens IF	1 – 2	IK Brage

==== 1980–81 ====
27 July 1980	IF Olympia	0 – 5	Djurgårdens IF

6 August 1980	Ljusne AIK	1 – 6	Djurgårdens IF

8 October 1980	Djurgårdens IF	0 – 1	IF Elfsborg
