= List of Djurgårdens IF Fotboll players =

This list is about Djurgårdens IF players with at least 100 league appearances. For a list of all Djurgårdens IF players with a Wikipedia article, see Category:Djurgårdens IF Fotboll players. For the current Djurgårdens IF first-team squad, see First-team squad.

This is a list of Djurgårdens IF players with at least 100 league appearances. Sven Lindman is the player with most Allsvenskan appearances, 312 matches and the most Allsvenskan goals has Gösta Sandberg, with 70. Gösta Sandberg is the player with the most league appearances, 322 matches. Gösta Sandberg has scored the most league goals, 77 goals.

== Players ==
Matches of current players as of before 2026 season.

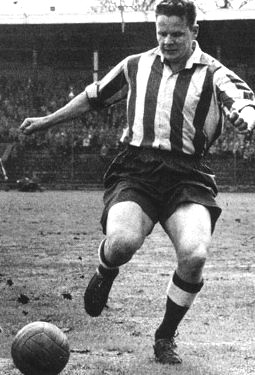
Gösta Sandberg has made 322 league appearances for Djurgårdens IF.

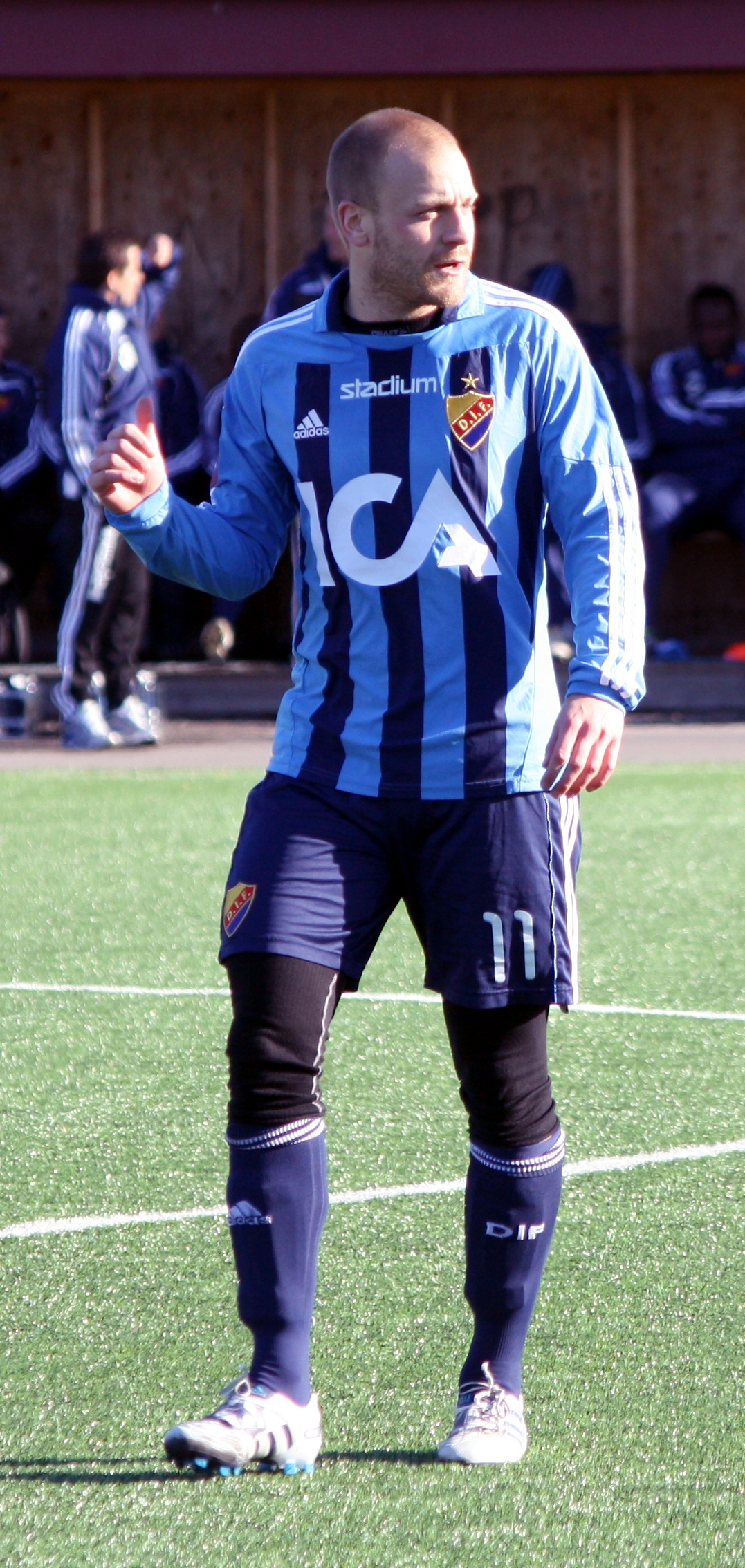
Daniel Sjölund has made 205 league appearances for Djurgårdens IF.

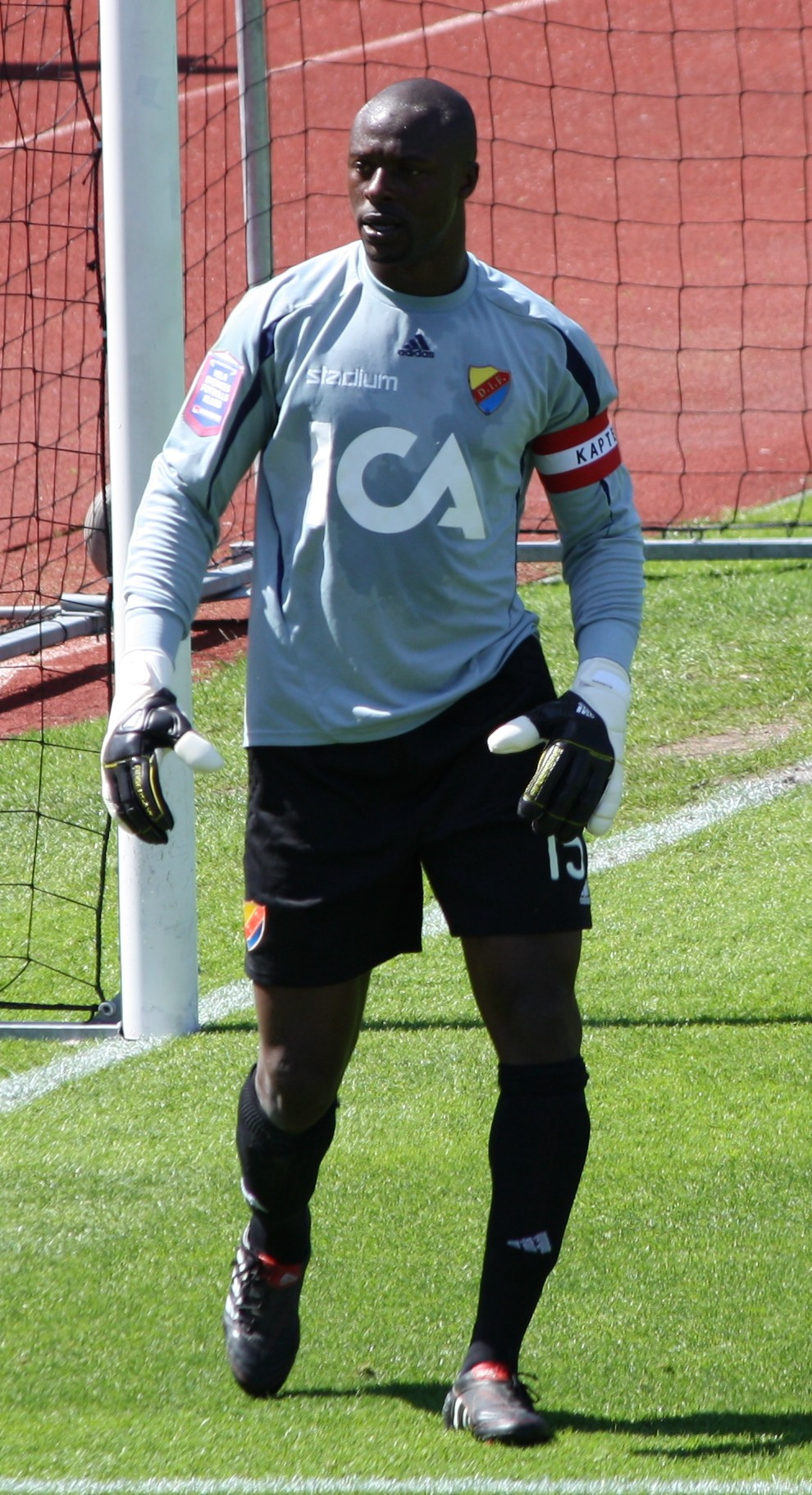
Pa Dembo Touray has made 195 league appearances for Djurgårdens IF.

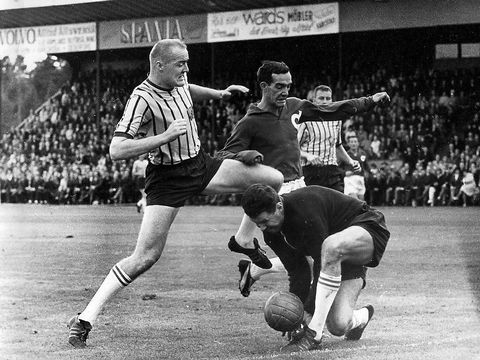
Hans Mild (left) has made 158 league appearances for Djurgårdens IF.

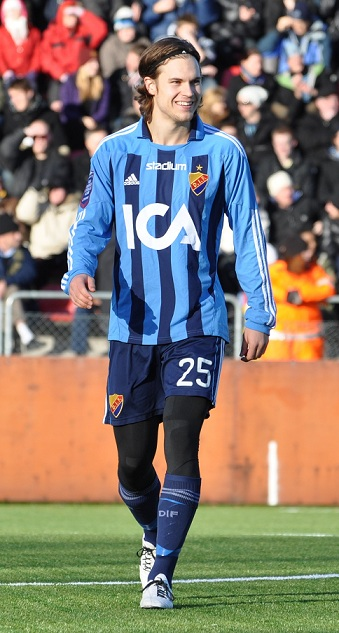
Sebastian Rajalakso has made 127 league appearances for Djurgårdens IF.

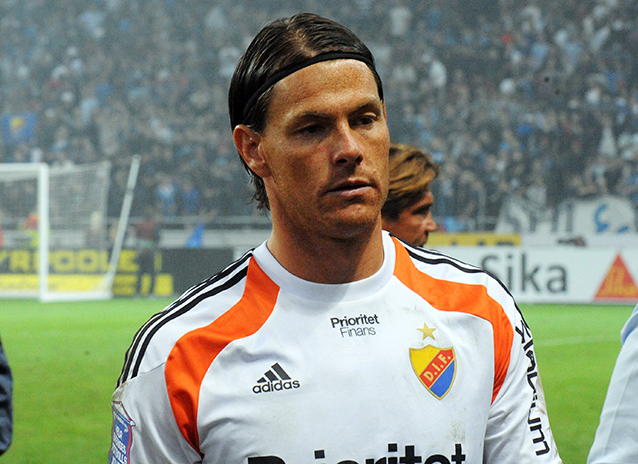
Kenneth Høie has made 73 league appearances for Djurgårdens IF. He is the most recent player to complete 100 matches.

Name	Nationality	Position	Djurgården career	League apps	League goals
Gösta Sandberg	Sweden	FW	1951–1966	322	77
Sven Lindman	Sweden	MF	1965–1968; 1969–1980	312	51
Tommy Berggren	Sweden	FW	1968–1984	289	54
Björn Alkeby	Sweden	GK	1971–1982; 1993	265	0
Arne Arvidsson	Sweden	GK	1952–1965	263	0
Haris Radetinac	Bosnia and Herzegovina	MF	2013–2024	241	22
Vito Knežević	Sweden	DF	1977–1988	237	17
Daniel Sjölund	Finland	MF	2003–2012	205	27
Leif Nilsson	Sweden	DF	1984–1992	204	3
Jacob Une	Sweden	DF	2016-	202	8
Håkan Stenbäck	Sweden	MF	1971–1980	199	43
Sigge Parling	Sweden	MF	1949–1960	196	12
Pa Dembo Touray	Gambia	GK	2000–2011	195	1
Stefan Rehn	Sweden	MF	1984–1989; 2000–2002	186	49
Lars Stenbäck	Sweden	MF	1975–1984	183	17
Markus Karlsson	Sweden	DF	1996–2004	178	3
Karl-Erik Andersson	Sweden	DF	1946–1957	174	3
Andreas Johansson	Sweden	MF	2000–2005; 2013–2014	172	50
Kjell Samuelsson	Sweden	MF	1972–1979	172	37
Jan-Erik Sjöberg	Sweden	MF	1965–1973	172	16
Tommy Davidsson	Sweden	DF	1970–1980	168	0
Hans Nilsson	Sweden	MF	1962–1973	165	61
Toni Kuivasto	Finland	DF	2003–2009	165	6
Magnus Eriksson	Sweden	MF	2016-2017; 2020-2024	164	29
Inge Karlsson	Sweden	DF	1965–1973	164	0
Elliot Käck	Sweden	DF	2015–2017; 2019-2023	160	1
Hans Mild	Sweden	MF	1957–1965	157	5
Roger Casslind	Sweden	DF	1978–1987	155	2
Hans Andersson-Tvilling	Sweden	FW	1947–1960	152	39
Niclas Rasck	Sweden	DF	1999–2006	152	3
Birger Jacobsson	Sweden	DF	1974–1980	150	2
Marcus Danielson	Sweden	DF	2018-2019; 2022-2025	147	15
Jesper Karlström	Sweden	MF	2015-2020	147	8
Jones Kusi-Asare	Sweden	FW	1999–2001; 2005–2008	145	39
Anders Grönhagen	Sweden	FW	1976–1983	144	48
Markus Johannesson	Sweden	DF	2004–2009	136	1
Magnus Pehrsson	Sweden	MF	1994–1996; 1999–2003	135	10
Fred Persson	Sweden	MF	1992–1998	135	5
Andreas Isaksson	Sweden	GK	2001-2004; 2016-2018	135	0
Lars Sandberg	Sweden	MF	1980–1986	134	8
Conny Granqvist	Sweden	FW	1966–1973	133	21
Kevin Walker	Sweden	MF	2015-2020	132	13
Emil Bergström	Sweden	DF	2011–2015	129	7
Joacim Sjöström	Sweden	GK	1983–1988	129	0
Birger Eklund	Sweden	FW	1952–1960	128	38
Sebastian Rajalakso	Sweden	MF	2008–2012	127	18
Olle Hellström	Sweden	DF	1957–1964; 1968	127	4
Stephan Kullberg	Sweden	DF	1986–1991	127	4
Glenn Schiller	Sweden	DF	1986–1992	127	2
Curt Olsberg	Sweden	MF	1974–1979	125	17
Harry Svensson	Sweden	MF	1971–1976	124	45
Jens Fjellström	Sweden	MF	1988–1992	123	22
John Eriksson	Sweden	FW	1951–1960	120	69
Stefan Alvén	Sweden	MF	1995–1999	120	2
Hans Karlsson	Sweden	DF	1956–1964	119	29
Birger Stenman	Sweden	MF	1947–1956	119	11
Kenneth Bergqvist	Sweden	DF	1988–1990; 1993–1997	118	5
Leif Eriksson	Sweden	FW	1960–1966	117	62
Willy Gummesson	Sweden	DF	1966–1971	117	2
Kenneth Høie	Norway	GK	2012–2016	117	0
Glenn Myrthil	Sweden	MF	1984–1989	116	47
Kebba Ceesay	Gambia	DF	2007–2012; 2016–2017	116	1
Petter Gustafsson	Sweden	MF	2009–2013	114	5
Ronney Pettersson	Sweden	GK	1960–1970	114	0
Johan Arneng	Sweden	MF	2003–2007	113	9
Mikael Nilsson	Sweden	DF	1991–1995	112	2
Stig Gustafsson	Sweden	DF	1955-1959	112	0
Peter Skoog	Sweden	FW	1987–1992	111	34
Ingvar Petersson	Sweden	DF		111	0
Lars Broström	Sweden	DF	1956–1963	110	0
Ove Nilsson	Sweden	GK	1946–1953	109	0
Mattias Jonson	Sweden	FW	2005–2011	105	22
Abgar Barsom	Sweden	MF	2000–2002; 2004–2006	105	10
Ronald Åhman	Sweden	MF	1979–1984	105	2
Claes Cronqvist	Sweden	FW	1966–1970	104	30
Johan Andersson	Sweden	DF	1993–1997	104	12
Rasmus Schüller	Finland	MF	2021-2025	104	2
Hampus Finndell	Sweden	MF	2019-2024; 2025-2026	103	14
Nils Cederborg	Sweden	FW		102	42
Krister Nordin	Sweden	MF	1987–1991	102	16
Zoran Stojcevski	Sweden	MF	1995–1999	101	17
