= Djurgårdens IF Fotboll–Hammarby Fotboll rivalry =

Football rivalry in Sweden

- Location: Stockholm, Sweden
- Teams: Djurgårdens IF; Hammarby IF
- First meeting: 1916
- Latest meeting: 15 Mars 2026; Hammarby IF-Djurgårdens IF (1–0)
- Next meeting: 26 April 2026; Djurgårdens IF-Hammarby IF

Statistics
- Most wins: Hammarby IF (55)
- Top scorer: Jan Sjöström, Hammarby IF (12)
- Largest victory: 13 August 1990; Djurgårdens IF–Hammarby IF (9–1)

The fixture between Djurgårdens IF and Hammarby IF is a local derby in Stockholm, Sweden. This important football rivalry traces its origin back to a tug-of-war tournament in 1894.

There is a certain social aspect in the Hammarby - Djurgården rivalry. Hammarby consider the formerly working-class neighbourhood of Södermalm, where their former home ground Söderstadion is situated, their stronghold. Djurgården count Östermalm, an affluent neighbourhood that forms the eastern part of the city centre, and where their former home ground Stadion is situated, as their stronghold. (Both clubs also maintain a cross-town rivalry with AIK, whose stronghold is the northwestern Stockholm urban area, where their home ground is situated.)

The two teams did not meet for five years (2010-2014) when Hammarby played in the second tier Superettan with Djurgården remaining in Allsvenskan. In 2013, both Djurgården and Hammarby moved into the newly built Tele2 Arena (now 3 Arena ) located in Johanneshov, just south of the city centre. This increased tensions significantly between the two sets of fans.

== Matches ==
As of 16 March 2026

	Matches	Wins		Draws	Goals		Home wins		Home draws		Away wins	
	Matches	Djurgården	Hammarby	Draws	Djurgården	Hammarby	Djurgården	Hammarby	Djurgården	Hammarby	Djurgården	Hammarby
Allsvenskan	94	39	37	18	152	140	22	25	13	5	17	12
Division 1	4	0	3	1	3	9	0	1	0	1	0	2
Division 2	26	10	9	7	38	38	5	6	5	2	5	3
Svenska Serien	6	1	3	2	6	12	1	1	0	2	0	2
Svenska Cupen	5	1	4	0	9	12	1	1	0	0	0	3
Svenska Mästerskapet	3	2	0	1	10	3	2	0	1	0	0	0
Total	138	53	56	29	215	214	31	34	18	10	22	22

=== Djurgårdens IF in the league at home ===
Date	Venue	Score	Competition	Attendance
20 May 1921	Stockholm Olympic Stadium	0–6	Svenska Serien	7,000
2 June 1922	Stockholm Olympic Stadium	0–2	Svenska Serien Östra	
9 Sep 1923	Tranebergs IP	3–0	Svenska Serien Östra	
6 Sep 1925	Tranebergs IP	0–0	Division 2 Östsvenska	700
2 May 1926	Tranebergs IP	2–0	Division 2 Östsvenska	500
26 August 1928	Tranebergs IP	2–1	Division 2 Norra	500
5 May 1933	Stockholm Olympic Stadium	1–1	Division 2 Östra	4,200
4 August 1933	Stockholm Olympic Stadium	1–0	Division 2 Östra	5,000
17 May 1935	Stockholm Olympic Stadium	0–0	Division 2 Östra	5,000
2 August 1935	Tranebergs IP	0–1	Division 2 Östra	1,500
6 May 1938	Stockholm Olympic Stadium	0–2	Division 2 Norra	12,714
18 Sep 1938	Stockholm Olympic Stadium	2–2	Division 2 Norra	9,048
27 Oct 1940	Stockholm Olympic Stadium	2–1	Division 2 Norra	3,013
25 May 1942	Stockholm Olympic Stadium	2–2	Division 2 Norra	8,477
7 August 1942	Stockholm Olympic Stadium	4–3	Division 2 Norra	1,729
1 May 1944	Stockholm Olympic Stadium	0–1	Division 2 Norra	4,687
17 Oct 1954	Råsunda Stadium	2–1	Allsvenskan	28,100
7 June 1956	Råsunda Stadium	4–1	Allsvenskan	14,912
26 May 1957	Råsunda Stadium	2–0	Allsvenskan	6,717
14 May 1959	Råsunda Stadium	1–0	Allsvenskan	32,577
7 Sep 1960	Råsunda Stadium	0–1	Allsvenskan	9,166
24 May 1962	Råsunda Stadium	1–1	Allsvenskan	17,559
9 May 1963	Råsunda Stadium	1–1	Allsvenskan	19,742
7 Oct 1965	Råsunda Stadium	2–0	Allsvenskan	7,408
8 Oct 1967	Råsunda Stadium	2–1	Allsvenskan	4,603
3 Sep 1970	Råsunda Stadium	1–1	Allsvenskan	25,665
9 Sep 1971	Råsunda Stadium	3–1	Allsvenskan	15,768
9 May 1972	Råsunda Stadium	1–1	Allsvenskan	16,096
13 Sep 1973	Råsunda Stadium	2–2	Allsvenskan	20,676
7 May 1974	Råsunda Stadium	2–0	Allsvenskan	18,790
28 August 1975	Råsunda Stadium	3–2	Allsvenskan	24,145
13 May 1976	Råsunda Stadium	0–3	Allsvenskan	19,714
15 Sep 1977	Råsunda Stadium	1–1	Allsvenskan	18,120
24 August 1978	Råsunda Stadium	3–2	Allsvenskan	11,135
30 August 1979	Råsunda Stadium	0–2	Allsvenskan	22,677
17 Sep 1980	Råsunda Stadium	2–1	Allsvenskan	24,663
21 May 1981	Råsunda Stadium	1–2	Allsvenskan	17,075
5 May 1986	Stockholm Olympic Stadium	1–3	Allsvenskan	14,424
1 May 1988	Stockholm Olympic Stadium	2–0	Allsvenskan	13,410
13 August 1990	Råsunda Stadium	9–1	Allsvenskan	8,768
5 Sep 1993	Råsunda Stadium	0–3	Division 1 Norra	14,032
25 Sep 1995	Stockholm Olympic Stadium	2–0	Allsvenskan	13,130
26 May 1997	Råsunda Stadium	0–1	Division 1 Norra	12,522
31 May 1999	Råsunda Stadium	1–0	Allsvenskan	23,066
12 June 2001	Råsunda Stadium	2–0	Allsvenskan	24,858
7 Oct 2002	Råsunda Stadium	2–1	Allsvenskan	24,858
30 June 2003	Råsunda Stadium	3–0	Allsvenskan	34,267
11 Sepr 2004	Råsunda Stadium	1–0	Allsvenskan	20,750
4 August 2005	Råsunda Stadium	2–2	Allsvenskan	27,108
10 April 2006	Råsunda Stadium	0–0	Allsvenskan	30,139
13 August 2007	Råsunda Stadium	1–0	Allsvenskan	24,634
7 May 2008	Råsunda Stadium	0–2	Allsvenskan	20,346
9 August 2009	Råsunda Stadium	0–1	Allsvenskan	16,374
24 August 2015	Tele2 Arena	2–2	Allsvenskan	27,428
19 April 2016	Tele2 Arena	1–3	Allsvenskan	24,900
24 Sep 2017	Tele2 Arena	1–1	Allsvenskan	24,174
29 April 2018	Tele2 Arena	1–2	Allsvenskan	24,396
6 Oct 2019	Tele2 Arena	1–2	Allsvenskan	25,053
9 August 2020	Tele2 Arena	1–2	Allsvenskan	COVID-19
12 Sep 2021	Tele2 Arena	4–1	Allsvenskan	9,120
3 July 2022	Tele2 Arena	1–0	Allsvenskan	27,203
22 Oct 2023	Tele2 Arena	0–0	Allsvenskan	24,564
2 June 2024	Tele2 Arena	0–3	Allsvenskan	27,344
14 Sep 2025	3 Arena	3–3	Allsvenskan	26,694

=== Hammarby IF in the league at home ===
Date	Venue	Score	Competition	Attendance
5 May 1920	Stockholm Olympic Stadium	1–1	Svenska Serien	
1 Oct 1922	Stockholm Olympic Stadium	1–1	Svenska Serien Östra	3,000
4 May 1924	Stockholm Olympic Stadium	2–1	Svenska Serien Östra	4,000
6 Sep 1925	Stockholm Olympic Stadium	3–1	Division 2 Östsvenska	14,000
12 Sep 1926	Stockholm Olympic Stadium	1–2	Division 2 Östsvenska	13,500
7 Oct 1928	Hammarby IP	2–1	Division 2 Norra	650
12 August 1932	Stockholm Olympic Stadium	1–2	Division 2 Östra	4,000
16 May 1934	Stockholm Olympic Stadium	3–1	Division 2 Östra	5,000
3 August 1934	Stockholm Olympic Stadium	3–3	Division 2 Östra	4,000
29 May 1936	Stockholm Olympic Stadium	1–3	Division 2 Östra	8,000
13 May 1938	Stockholm Olympic Stadium	1–0	Division 2 Norra	12,288
12 Augusti 1938	Stockholm Olympic Stadium	3–2	Division 2 Norra	4,290
16 May 1941	Stockholm Olympic Stadium	0–4	Division 2 Norra	3,734
22 August 1941	Stockholm Olympic Stadium	4–0	Division 2 Norra	1,701
2 May 1943	Råsunda Stadium	2–2	Division 2 Norra	4,649
26 Sep 1943	Råsunda Stadium	0–1	Division 2 Norra	1,508
28 April 1955	Råsunda Stadium	2–3	Allsvenskan	14,978
4 August 1955	Råsunda Stadium	2–1	Allsvenskan	22,474
10 August 1956	Råsunda Stadium	2–5	Allsvenskan	12,870
1 Oct 1959	Råsunda Stadium	0–2	Allsvenskan	21,831
12 June 1960	Råsunda Stadium	2–0	Allsvenskan	10,603
30 August 1962	Råsunda Stadium	2–4	Allsvenskan	19,730
22 Sep 1963	Råsunda Stadium	1–3	Allsvenskan	17,402
29 April 1965	Råsunda Stadium	2–1	Allsvenskan	20,341
15 June 1967	Råsunda stadium	2–1	Allsvenskan	16,639
23 April 1970	Råsunda Stadium	0–2	Allsvenskan	11,194
17 June 1971	Råsunda Stadium	1–0	Allsvenskan	20,830
21 Sep 1972	Råsunda Stadium	1–8	Allsvenskan	10,468
17 May 1973	Råsunda Stadium	4–1	Allsvenskan	11,482
22 August 1974	Råsunda Stadium	2–0	Allsvenskan	20,431
12 June 1975	Råsunda Stadium	1–2	Allsvenskan	20,327
12 Sep 1976	Råsunda Stadium	0–2	Allsvenskan	10,813
22 June 1977	Råsunda Stadium	3–1	Allsvenskan	15,407
10 August 1978	Råsunda Stadium	4–1	Allsvenskan	13,913
14 June 1979	Råsunda Stadium	5–2	Allsvenskan	20,773
5 June 1980	Råsunda Stadium	1–1	Allsvenskan	19,069
27 August 1981	Råsunda Stadium	1–1	Allsvenskan	11,556
17 Sep 1986	Söderstadion	0–2	Allsvenskan	6,637
8 August 1988	Söderstadion	0–4	Allsvenskan	6,612
6 May 1990	Söderstadion	3–0	Allsvenskan	7,152
26 May 1993	Söderstadion	3–1	Division 1 Norra	9,692
22 May 1995	Råsunda Stadium	0–1	Allsvenskan	12,822
1 Oct 1997	Söderstadion	2–2	Division 1 Norra	9,127
4 Oct 1999	Råsunda Stadium	2–1	Allsvenskan	21,416
9 August 2001	Råsunda Stadium	0–1	Allsvenskan	34,275
15 July 2002	Råsunda Stadium	1–2	Allsvenskan	25,626
16 Sep 2003	Råsunda Stadium	2–3	Allsvenskan	35,611
19 July 2004	Råsunda Stadium	3–0	Allsvenskan	24,165
18 May 2005	Söderstadion	2–1	Allsvenskan	15,322
28 August 2006	Söderstadion	0–3	Allsvenskan	15,092
19 June 2007	Råsunda Stadium	2–0	Allsvenskan	23,545
20 Oct 2008	Råsunda Stadium	3–0	Allsvenskan	12,483
20 April 2009	Råsunda Stadium	3–1	Allsvenskan	16,238
15 April 2015	Tele2 Arena	2–1	Allsvenskan	27,597
17 Oct 2016	Tele2 Arena	4–2	Allsvenskan	28,493
4 June 2017	Tele2 Arena	3–1	Allsvenskan	29,374
2 Sep 2018	Tele2 Arena	1–3	Allsvenskan	26,937
28 April 2019	Tele2 Arena	2–1	Allsvenskan	27,554
4 Oct 2020	Tele2 Arena	1–1	Allsvenskan	COVID-19
16 May 2021	Tele2 Arena	2-2	Allsvenskan	COVID-19
11 Sep 2022	Tele2 Arena	0-0	Allsvenskan	27,987
14 May 2023	Tele2 Arena	4–3	Allsvenskan	26,442
21 Oct 2024	Tele2 Arena	2–0	Allsvenskan	27,881
13 April 2025	3 Arena	2–0	Allsvenskan	28,333

=== Cup ===
Date	Venue	Matches			Competition	Attendance
Date	Venue	Team 1	Score	Team 2	Competition	Attendance
10 August 1916	Tranebergs IP	Djurgårdens IF	7–1	Hammarby IF	Svenska Mästerskapet Last 16	2,500
12 August 1919	Stockholm Olympic Stadium	Djurgårdens IF	1–1	Hammarby	Svenska Mästerskapet Last 16	6,000
29 August 1919	Stockholm Olympic Stadium	Djurgårdens IF	2–1	Hammarby	Svenska Mästerskapet Last 16 replay	3,000
24 July 1977	Stockholm Olympic Stadium	Djurgårdens IF	4–5 a.e.t.	Hammarby IF	Svenska Cupen	2,910
6 March 2016	Tele2 Arena	Djurgårdens IF	1-3	Hammarby IF	Svenska Cupen	21,367
10 March 2019	Tele2 Arena	Djurgårdens IF	4–2 a.e.t.	Hammarby IF	Svenska Cupen	20,750
4 April 2021	Tele2 Arena	Djurgårdens IF	0-1	Hammarby IF	Svenska Cupen	COVID-19
15 March 2026	3 Arena	Hammarby IF	1-0	Djurgårdens IF	Svenska Cupen	26,490

== Records ==
=== Biggest wins (5+ goals) ===
Margin	Result	Date	Event
8	Djurgårdens IF – Hammarby IF 9–1	13 August 1990	Allsvenskan
7	Hammarby IF – Djurgårdens IF 1–8	21 September 1972	Allsvenskan
6	Djurgårdens IF – Hammarby IF 7–1	10 August 1916	Svenska Mästerskapet
6	Djurgårdens IF – Hammarby IF 0–6	20 May 1921	Svenska Serien

=== Longest runs ===
==== Most consecutive wins ====
Games	Club	Period
6	Djurgårdens IF	9 August 2001 – 16 September 2003
5	Djurgårdens IF	7 June 1956 – 1 October 1959
5	Hammarby IF	7 May 2008 – 15 April 2015
4	Hammarby IF	19 April 2016 - 2 September 2018

=== Goalscorers ===
==== Top scorers ====
Rank	Player	Nationality	Club	League	Cup	Total
1	Jan Sjöström	Sweden	Hammarby	12	0	12
2	Billy Ohlsson	Sweden	Hammarby	3	4	7
2	Nahir Besara	Sweden	Hammarby	7	0	7
4	Håkan Stenbäck	Sweden	Djurgården	6	0	6
4	Mats Werner	Sweden	Hammarby	6	0	6
6	Kjell Samuelsson	Sweden	Djurgården	5	0	5
6	Rômulo	Brazil	Hammarby	5	0	5
7	Ulf Eriksson	Sweden	Hammarby	4	0	4
7	Hans Nilsson	Sweden	Djurgården	4	0	4
7	Kay Wiestål	Sweden	Djurgården	4	0	4
7	Samuel Wowoah	Sweden	Djurgården	4	0	4
11	Mikael Andersson	Sweden	Hammarby	3	0	3
11	Tommy Berggren	Sweden	Djurgården	3	0	3
11	Dan Brzokoupil	Sweden	Djurgården	3	0	3
11	Charlie Davies	United States	Hammarby	3	0	3
11	Hans Eskilsson	Sweden	Hammarby	3	0	3
11	Lars-Ove Johansson	Sweden	Hammarby	3	0	3
11	Kim Källström	Sweden	Djurgården	3	0	3
11	Jones Kusi-Asare	Sweden	Djurgården	3	0	3
11	Sven Lindman	Sweden	Djurgården	3	0	3
11	Pablo Piñones Arce	Sweden	Hammarby	3	0	3
11	Björn Runström	Sweden	Hammarby	3	0	3
11	Leif Skiöld	Sweden	Djurgården	3	0	3

==== Consecutive goalscoring ====
Rank	Player	Club	Consecutive Matches	Total Goals in the run	Start	End
1	(Sweden) Håkan Stenbäck	Djurgården	3	3	1977 Allsvenskan (22nd round)	1978 Allsvenskan (15th round)
1	(Sweden) Ulf Eriksson	Hammarby	3	3	1981 Allsvenskan (6th round)	1982 Allsvenskan (3rd round)
1	(United States) Charlie Davies	Hammarby	3	3	2008 Allsvenskan (10th round)	2009 Allsvenskan (4th round)

== Shared player history ==
=== Transfers ===
- (Sweden) Oscar Gustafsson (Djurgården to Hammarby) (1916)
- (Sweden) Bertil Andersson (Djurgården to Hammarby) (1933)
- (Sweden) Axel Sidén (Djurgården to Hammarby) (1935)
- (Sweden) Arvid Schough (Djurgården to Hammarby) (1939)
- (Sweden) Ingmar Holm (Djurgården to Hammarby) (1940)
- (Sweden) Gösta Lantz (Djurgården to Hammarby) (1941)
- (Sweden) Bertil Jansson (Djurgården to Hammarby) (1948)
- (Sweden) Erik Ernström (Djurgården to Hammarby) (1950)
- (Sweden) Axel Eriksson (Djurgården to Hammarby) (1951)
- (Sweden) Aldor Eriksson (Djurgården to Hammarby) (1951)
- (Sweden) Folke Holmberg (Hammarby to Djurgården) (1951)
- (Sweden) Folke Holmberg (Djurgården to Hammarby) (1953)
- (Sweden) Hans Holmqvist (Djurgården to Hammarby) (1984)
- (Sweden) Kjell Granqvist (Hammarby to Djurgården) (1986)
- (Sweden) Leif Strandh (Hammarby to Djurgården) (1991)
- (Sweden) Leif Strandh (Djurgården to Hammarby) (1992)
- (Sweden) Kaj Eskelinen (Djurgården to Hammarby) (1998)
- (Sweden) Johan Andersson (Djurgården to Hammarby) (1998)
- (Sweden) Hjalmar Ekdal (Hammarby to Djurgården) (2021)

=== Played for both clubs ===
- (Sweden) Paul Lundberg (Djurgården to Åtvidaberg to Hammarby) (1936)
- (Sweden) Jan Svensson (Djurgården to IS Halmia Hammarby) (1974)
- (Sweden) Dan Brzokoupil (Djurgården to Landskrona to Hammarby) (1975)
- (Sweden) Lars Stenbäck (Djurgården to IFK Västerås to Hammarby) (1976)
- (Sweden) Thomas Sunesson (Djurgården to Brommapojkarna to Hammarby) (1989)
- (Sweden) Klebér Saarenpää (Djurgården to IFK Norrköping to AaB to Sirius to Hammarby) (2005)
- (Sweden) Rami Shaaban (Djurgården to Arsenal to Brighton & Hove Albion to Fredrikstad to Hammarby) (2008)
- (Syria) Louay Chanko (Djurgården to Malmö FF to AEK Athens to Hammarby) (2009)
- (Sweden) Jesper Blomqvist (Djurgården to Enköping to Hammarby) (2010)
- (Sweden) Luis Antonio Rodríguez (Djurgården to AaB to Sunkar to Hammarby) (2012)
- (Sweden) Stefan Batan (Djurgården to Assyriska to Hammarby) (2014)

=== Played for one club, managed the other ===
- (Sweden) Sören Åkeby (played for Hammarby, managed Djurgården)
- (Sweden) Michael Andersson (played for Hammarby, managed Djurgården)
- (Sweden) Michael Borgqvist (played for Djurgården, managed Hammarby)
- (Sweden) Tommy Davidsson (played for Djurgården, managed Hammarby)
- (Sweden) Kim Bergstrand (played for Hammarby, managed Djurgården)

=== Managed both clubs ===
Manager	Djurgårdens IF career						Hammarby IF career					
Manager	Span	G^{1}	W	D	L	Win %	Span	G^{1}	W	D	L	Win %
(Sweden) Hans Backe	1982–1984	70	38	20	12	54.3	1987–1988	44	11	13	20	25.0
(Sweden) Per Kaufeldt	1944–1950	124	59	15	50	47.6	1940–1944					
(Sweden) Bengt Persson	1975-1978	102	39	34	29	38,2	1982-1984	66	33	13	20	50.0

^{1} Only competitive matches are counted.

== See also ==
- AIK Fotboll–Hammarby Fotboll rivalry
- Tvillingderbyt
