= Tvillingderbyt =

Football rivalry in Stockholm, Sweden

- Location: Stockholm, Sweden
- Teams: AIK; Djurgårdens IF
- First meeting: 16 July 1899 (Note: First match between the two teams)
- Latest meeting: 16 August 2026; Djurgården–AIK (1-3)
- Next meeting: TBD

Statistics
- Most wins: AIK (68)
- Most player appearances: Sven Lindman, Djurgården (25)
- Top scorer: Yngve Leback, AIK (7)
- Largest victory: 12 June 1908; AIK–Djurgården (0–6); 2 June 1915; Djurgården–AIK (0–6)

Tvillingderbyt (Swedish: [ˈtvɪ̂lːɪŋˌdærbʏt]; lit. 'the Twin Derby') is a football fixture in the capital Stockholm, Sweden, between cross-town rivals AIK Stockholm and Djurgårdens IF. Both clubs were founded in Stockholm in 1891, AIK was first with Djurgårdens IF following three weeks later, but they started playing football in 1896 (AIK) and 1899 (Djurgårdens IF) respectively.

== History ==
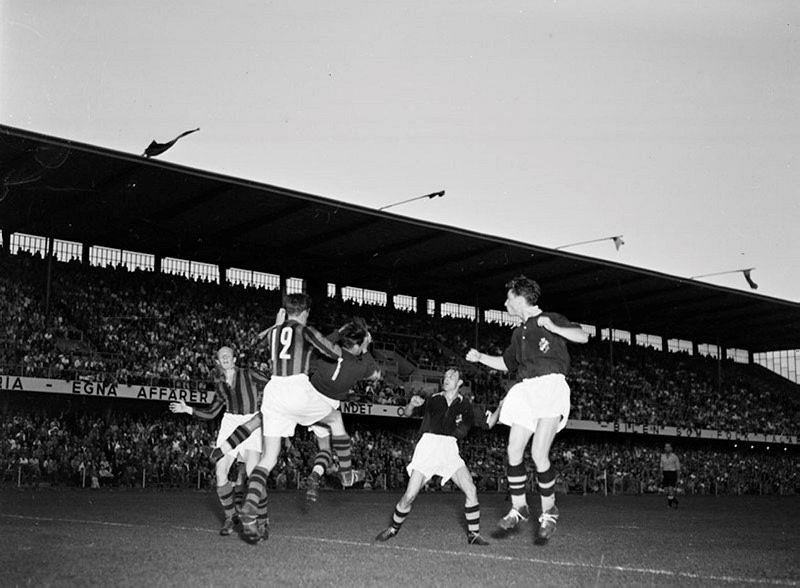
Tvillingderbyt in the 1950–51 Allsvenskan season.

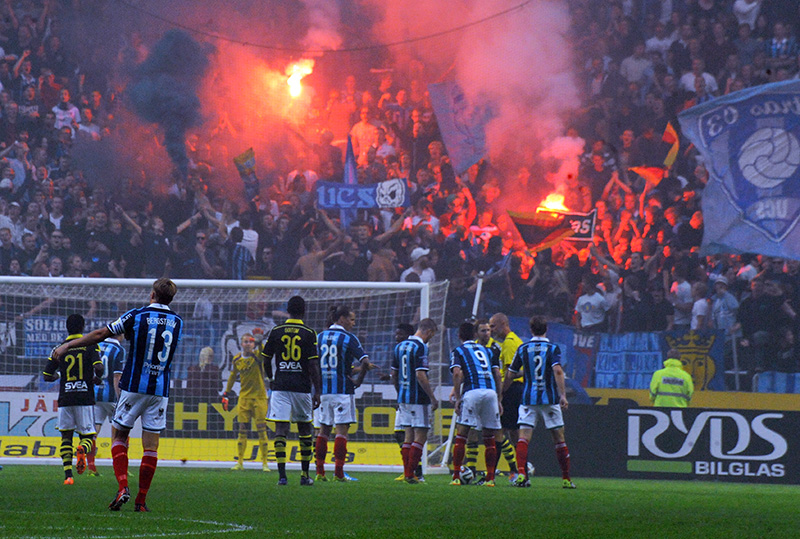
Tvillingderbyt in the 2014 Allsvenskan season.

The Stockholm sports clubs AIK and Djurgårdens IF were both founded in 1891 as general sports clubs. AIK was founded the 15th of February 1891 in the city centre of Stockholm on Biblioteksgatan 8. Djurgårdens IF was founded the 12th of March on the eastern island Djurgården in Stockholm.

AIK started playing football in 1896, while Djurgårdens IF Fotboll started in 1899. the first football match between them was played on 16 July 1899 at Svea Lifgardes IP and resulted in a 2–1 AIK win.

When Jesper Jansson left AIK for Djurgården before the 1996 season, he was threatened and the door of his apartment was vandalised by Firman Boys, a group connected to AIK. When former AIK player Anders Limpar signed for Djurgården in 2000, his restaurant in Stockholm was vandalised by the same group.

An attendance of 45,367 people watched a 2019 match, breaking an earlier record from 1975. The May 2023 match was interrupted after supporters on the AIK section had thrown flares onto the pitch. Chat messages showed that the action was planned by people on the section in the case of a possible AIK loss.

== Rivalry culture ==
The fixture between AIK and Djurgården is generally considered to be the most important derby in Sweden. The clubs are among Stockholm’s most successful teams, with AIK having won twelve Swedish championship titles and eight Svenska Cupen titles, while Djurgården has won twelve national titles and five cup titles.

Both clubs were founded in 1891, just three weeks apart. Therefore, the derby is known as the Tvillingderbyt (lit. 'the Twin Derby'). This fixture is considered the fiercest rivalry in Scandinavia. Since 1891, 231 fixtures have been contested in all competitions with 87 AIK wins and 82 Djurgården wins.

Both clubs have a large number of fans throughout Stockholm. There is somewhat of a geographical divide; Djurgården consider the affluent Östermalm district, the eastern part of Stockholm City Centre, their heartland, with strong support along the northern Red Line of the Metro and the Roslagen trainline.

AIK has a strong concentration of fans in the northern and western part of the Stockholm urban area, roughly Blue Line and western-going Green Line of the Metro. Mixed Djurgårdens IF and AIK supporters can also be found all-round in Stockholm city and the southwestern part of Stockholms urban area and the Stockholm archipelago. Both clubs also maintain a cross-town rivalry with Hammarby IF, whose stronghold is the Södermalm district, the southern part of the city centre.

The AIK–Djurgården rivalry is also found in ice hockey which further strengthens the tension between both sets of fans and makes the rivalry somewhat unique for Swedish sports. They are the only two clubs in Sweden who have won more than one championship in both football and ice hockey – AIK have won twelve football titles and seven ice hockey titles; Djurgården have won twelve in football and 16 in ice hockey.

The clubs have also met in other sports: the bandy teams have played the Saint Stephen's Day bandy match, e.g. in 2006; The first basketball derby played in 2016, a Division 2 match in Solnahallen.

== Matches ==
	Matches	Wins		Draws	Goals		Home wins		Home draws		Away wins	
	Matches	AIK	Djurgården	Draws	AIK	Djurgården	AIK	Djurgården	AIK	Djurgården	AIK	Djurgården
Allsvenskan	126	52	29	45	174	135	27	18	24	21	25	11
Mästerskapsserien	2	1	1	0	4	4	1	1	0	0	0	0
Fyrkantsserien	4	1	0	3	8	6	0	0	2	1	1	0
Svenska Serien	18	6	8	4	33	33	2	5	4	0	4	3
Stockholmsserien 1	5	1	4	0	3	17	1	2	0	0	0	2
Serien	3	0	3	0	2	9	0	2	0	0	0	1
Svenska Cupen	11	5	5	1	18	15	4	1	1	0	1	4
Svenska Mästerskapet	6	1	5	0	7	14	1	3	0	0	0	2
Svenska Mästerskapet qualifiers	1	1	0	0	2	1	1	0	0	0	0	0
Stockholms Idrottsförbunds Tävlingar	1	1	0	0	1	0	1	0	0	0	0	0
Rosenska pokalen	1	1	0	0	2	0	1	0	0	0	0	0
Allsvenskan promotion/relegation play-off	2	1	0	1	4	3	0	0	1	0	1	0
Total	180	71	55	54	258	237	39	32	32	22	32	23

=== AIK in the league at home ===
Date	Venue	Score	Competition	Att.
30 May 1905	Idrottsparken	0–2	Serien	
29 May 1906	Idrottsparken	0–4	Stockholmsserien 1	
12 June 1908	Idrottsparken	0–6	Stockholmsserien 1	
1909	Idrottsparken	2–1	Stockholmsserien 1	
25 May 1911	Råsunda IP	0–2	Svenska Serien	
29 September 1912	Råsunda IP	0–3	Svenska Serien	
26 May 1914	Olympic Stadium	2–2	Svenska Serien	
18 October 1914	Olympic Stadium	1–3	Svenska Serien	
7 May 1916	Olympic Stadium	4–0	Svenska Serien	
24 May 1917	Olympic Stadium	0–0	Svenska Serien	
10 November 1918	Olympic Stadium	2–2	Fyrkantsserien	
1 June 1919	Olympic Stadium	1–1	Fyrkantsserien	
2 June 1920	Olympic Stadium	0–0	Svenska Serien	
15 June 1922	Olympic Stadium	1–1	Svenska Serien	
2 September 1923	Olympic Stadium	5–4	Svenska Serien	
10 August 1927	Olympic Stadium	2–1	Allsvenskan	6,667
14 August 1936	Olympic Stadium	4–1	Allsvenskan	15,694
10 May 1946	Råsunda	3–1	Allsvenskan	28,838
23 May 1947	Råsunda	5–0	Allsvenskan	26,394
13 August 1947	Råsunda	1–1	Allsvenskan	23,015
26 May 1950	Råsunda	2–1	Allsvenskan	27,280
18 August 1950	Råsunda	1–1	Allsvenskan	23,015
8 August 1952	Råsunda	0–0	Allsvenskan	18,896
14 April 1954	Råsunda	0–0	Allsvenskan	38,448
12 August 1954	Råsunda	0–1	Allsvenskan	40,458
17 August 1955	Råsunda	3–1	Allsvenskan	32,238
17 May 1957	Råsunda	2–1	Allsvenskan	34,640
9 May 1958	Råsunda	1–1	Allsvenskan	32,152
10 June 1959	Råsunda	1–1	Allsvenskan	33,060
11 May 1960	Råsunda	1–2	Allsvenskan	29,807
12 June 1963	Råsunda	1–1	Allsvenskan	38,048
10 June 1964	Råsunda	0–0	Allsvenskan	35,170
2 September 1965	Råsunda	1–0	Allsvenskan	30,180
22 September 1966	Råsunda	1–0	Allsvenskan	24,051
24 August 1967	Råsunda	0–0	Allsvenskan	23,938
12 June 1968	Råsunda	0–4	Allsvenskan	28,051
2 September 1969	Råsunda	0–1	Allsvenskan	22,573
9 September 1970	Råsunda	1–0	Allsvenskan	20,388
20 September 1971	Råsunda	1–0	Allsvenskan	20,883
1 June 1972	Råsunda	1–1	Allsvenskan	30,759
4 September 1973	Råsunda	0–3	Allsvenskan	34,584
12 September 1974	Råsunda	3–2	Allsvenskan	23,394
29 May 1975	Råsunda	1–2	Allsvenskan	40,669
2 September 1976	Råsunda	5–0	Allsvenskan	22,905
23 August 1977	Råsunda	2–0	Allsvenskan	26,157
21 September 1978	Råsunda	0–4	Allsvenskan	17,324
23 August 1979	Råsunda	1–1	Allsvenskan	14,294
17 June 1981	Råsunda	3–0	Allsvenskan	12,543
22 May 1986	Råsunda	3–2	Allsvenskan	12,171
6 July 1988	Råsunda	0–0	Allsvenskan	16,869
31 August 1989	Råsunda	1–1	Allsvenskan	9,398
16 May 1990	Råsunda	1–0	Allsvenskan	18,948
30 May 1991	Råsunda	0–0	Allsvenskan	24,049
19 August 1991	Råsunda	3–0	Mästerskapsserien	14,672
11 May 1992	Råsunda	4–4	Allsvenskan	13,188
19 September 1995	Råsunda	1–2	Allsvenskan	17,028
5 June 1996	Råsunda	1–0	Allsvenskan	15,779
14 June 1999	Råsunda	3–1	Allsvenskan	28,054
15 May 2001	Råsunda	1–1	Allsvenskan	27,860
8 August 2002	Råsunda	0–3	Allsvenskan	28,334
2 June 2003	Råsunda	3–3	Allsvenskan	35,197
23 September 2004	Råsunda	1–1	Allsvenskan	18,876
27 April 2006	Råsunda	3–1	Allsvenskan	34,174
24 September 2007	Råsunda	1–1	Allsvenskan	34,116
24 April 2008	Råsunda	1–1	Allsvenskan	34,173
28 September 2009	Råsunda	2–0	Allsvenskan	26,241
2 May 2010	Råsunda	1–2	Allsvenskan	21,181
19 September 2011	Råsunda	0–1	Allsvenskan	24,639
8 May 2012	Råsunda	1–1	Allsvenskan	27,112
22 May 2013	Friends Arena	1–1	Allsvenskan	35,311
13 August 2014	Friends Arena	1–1	Allsvenskan	28,240
10 August 2015	Friends Arena	1–0	Allsvenskan	39,387
16 May 2016	Friends Arena	2–0	Allsvenskan	26,109
27 August 2017	Friends Arena	1–1	Allsvenskan	33,157
15 April 2018	Friends Arena	2–0	Allsvenskan	30,552
1 September 2019	Friends Arena	1–0	Allsvenskan	45,367
26 July 2020	Friends Arena	0–1	Allsvenskan	COVID-19
3 October 2021	Friends Arena	1–0	Allsvenskan	42,539
24 April 2022	Friends Arena	1–0	Allsvenskan	41,407
24 September 2023	Friends Arena	2–0	Allsvenskan	41,327
21 April 2024	Friends Arena	2–0	Allsvenskan	44,734

=== Djurgården in the league at home ===
Date	Venue	Score	Competition	Att.
6 July 1902	Idrottsparken	3–0	Serien	
5 November 1905	Idrottsparken	4–2	Serien	
31 July 1906	Idrottsparken	3–0	Stockholmsserien 1	
16 August 1908	Idrottsparken	3–1	Stockholmsserien 1	
1 October 1911	Tranebergs IP	3–1	Svenska Serien	
27 April 1913	Olympic Stadium	1–4	Svenska Serien	
14 September 1913	Olympic Stadium	1–2	Svenska Serien	
2 June 1915	Olympic Stadium	0–6	Svenska Serien	
19 September 1915	Råsunda IP	3–1	Svenska Serien	2,000
29 October 1916	Olympic Stadium	1–2	Svenska Serien	
31 May 1918	Olympic Stadium	0–2	Fyrkantsserien	
17 June 1919	Olympic Stadium	3–3	Fyrkantsserien	
1 July 1921	Olympic Stadium	3–2	Svenska Serien	
12 November 1922	Olympic Stadium	4–2	Svenska Serien	
9 May 1924	Olympic Stadium	2–0	Svenska Serien	
9 May 1928	Olympic Stadium	3–3	Allsvenskan	7,913
14 May 1937	Olympic Stadium	1–2	Allsvenskan	10,360
8 August 1945	Olympic Stadium	1–3	Allsvenskan	19,294
16 August 1946	Olympic Stadium	0–2	Allsvenskan	21,995
14 May 1948	Råsunda	1–3	Allsvenskan	25,876
12 August 1949	Råsunda	1–1	Allsvenskan	33,737
22 May 1951	Råsunda	2–1	Allsvenskan	36,959
19 April 1953	Råsunda	1–2	Allsvenskan	26,481
21 August 1953	Råsunda	2–3	Allsvenskan	24,805
26 May 1955	Råsunda	0–2	Allsvenskan	39,696
25 May 1956	Råsunda	2–1	Allsvenskan	33,000
22 August 1956	Råsunda	2–1	Allsvenskan	23,711
21 August 1957	Råsunda	1–1	Allsvenskan	26,048
15 August 1958	Råsunda	0–0	Allsvenskan	23,637
26 August 1959	Råsunda	4–2	Allsvenskan	38,255
24 August 1960	Råsunda	2–0	Allsvenskan	25,932
11 September 1963	Råsunda	3–1	Allsvenskan	43,261
26 August 1964	Råsunda	3–0	Allsvenskan	25,718
9 June 1965	Råsunda	2–2	Allsvenskan	26,747
25 May 1966	Råsunda	1–0	Allsvenskan	24,735
25 May 1967	Råsunda	1–1	Allsvenskan	44,130
4 September 1968	Råsunda	2–0	Allsvenskan	35,921
4 June 1969	Råsunda	2–0	Allsvenskan	20,530
13 May 1970	Råsunda	4–1	Allsvenskan	25,032
3 June 1971	Råsunda	1–2	Allsvenskan	26,014
2 October 1972	Råsunda	1–2	Allsvenskan	20,141
7 June 1973	Råsunda	0–4	Allsvenskan	24,161
14 May 1974	Råsunda	0–2	Allsvenskan	32,527
11 September 1975	Råsunda	0–0	Allsvenskan	28,639
10 June 1976	Råsunda	1–1	Allsvenskan	22,121
2 June 1977	Råsunda	1–1	Allsvenskan	28,272
11 May 1978	Råsunda	0–0	Allsvenskan	11,206
17 May 1979	Råsunda	0–0	Allsvenskan	23,378
16 September 1981	Råsunda	0–0	Allsvenskan	5,509
13 August 1986	Olympic Stadium	0–2	Allsvenskan	10,807
14 August 1988	Råsunda	0–0	Allsvenskan	11,063
11 May 1989	Råsunda	0–0	Allsvenskan	9,222
27 August 1990	Råsunda	2–1	Allsvenskan	13,412
16 May 1991	Råsunda	2–1	Allsvenskan	10,384
30 August 1991	Råsunda	4–1	Mästerskapsserien	9,844
21 May 1992	Olympic Stadium	1–1	Allsvenskan	15,012
18 June 1995	Råsunda	1–2	Allsvenskan	11,159
18 September 1996	Råsunda	0–2	Allsvenskan	11,020
30 August 1999	Råsunda	0–0	Allsvenskan	19,128
19 September 2001	Råsunda	1–2	Allsvenskan	28,060
13 April 2002	Råsunda	3–4	Allsvenskan	29,423
1 September 2003	Råsunda	2–1	Allsvenskan	30,609
13 April 2004	Råsunda	3–1	Allsvenskan	32,590
20 September 2006	Råsunda	0–1	Allsvenskan	31,890
28 May 2007	Råsunda	3–1	Allsvenskan	32,529
24 September 2008	Råsunda	1–1	Allsvenskan	22,312
18 May 2009	Råsunda	0–1	Allsvenskan	21,884
3 October 2010	Råsunda	2–1	Allsvenskan	18,511
4 April 2011	Råsunda	0–0	Allsvenskan	28,931
16 September 2012	Råsunda	0–3	Allsvenskan	30,857
26 September 2013	Tele2 Arena	2–2	Allsvenskan	27,112
16 April 2014	Tele2 Arena	2–3	Allsvenskan	25,175
25 May 2015	Tele2 Arena	2–2	Allsvenskan	27,137
21 September 2016	Tele2 Arena	0–3	Allsvenskan	22,197
22 May 2017	Tele2 Arena	0–1	Allsvenskan	25,753
21 October 2018	Tele2 Arena	0–0	Allsvenskan	21,711
13 May 2019	Tele2 Arena	0–2	Allsvenskan	21,127
8 November 2020	Tele2 Arena	0–1	Allsvenskan	COVID-19
8 August 2021	Tele2 Arena	1–4	Allsvenskan	8,721
16 October 2022	Tele2 Arena	1–2	Allsvenskan	26,702
28 May 2023	Tele2 Arena	1–0	Allsvenskan	26,084
18 August 2024	Tele2 Arena	0–2	Allsvenskan	26,225

=== Cup ===
Date	Venue	Matches			Competition	Att.
Date	Venue	Team 1	Score	Team 2	Competition	Att.
16 July 1899	Svea Lifgardes IP	AIK	2–1	Djurgården	Stockholm Idrottsförbunds tävlingar	
1900	Lindarängen	AIK	1–0	Djurgården	Svenska Mästerskapet qualifiers	
1900	Lindarängen	AIK	2–0	Djurgården	Rosenska Pokalen semi-final	2,500
25 September 1904	Idrottsparken	Djurgården	3–2	AIK	Svenska Mästerskapet semi-final	
25 September 1909	Idrottsparken	AIK	0–3	Djurgården	Svenska Mästerskapet second round	
3 October 1915	Olympic Stadium	Djurgården	2–1	AIK	Svenska Mästerskapet semi-final	4,000
22 October 1916	Olympic Stadium	AIK	3–1	Djurgården	Svenska Mästerskapet final	7,500
11 November 1917	Olympic Stadium	Djurgården	3–1	AIK	Svenska Mästerskapet final	7,256
18 August 1922	Unknown arena	AIK	0–2	Djurgården	Svenska Mästerskapet first round	
13 July 1947	Råsunda	AIK	3–2	Djurgården	Svenska Cupen quarter-final	
3 July 1949	Råsunda	AIK	6–1	Djurgården	Svenska Cupen quarter-final	
7 April 1969	Unknown arena	Djurgården	1–1	AIK	Svenska Cupen quarter-final	
23 April 1969	Råsunda	AIK	1–0	Djurgården	Svenska Cupen quarter-final replay	
11 May 1972	Råsunda	AIK	2–3	Djurgården	Svenska Cupen quarter-final	1,655
26 July 1981	Råsunda	AIK	0–3	Djurgården	Svenska Cupen round of 32	4,193
19 August 1987	Råsunda	Djurgården	0–3	AIK	Svenska Cupen quarter-final	3,507
20 April 1995	Råsunda	AIK	1–0	Djurgården	Svenska Cupen quarter-final	5,354
9 November 2002	Råsunda	AIK	0–1 gg	Djurgården	Svenska Cupen final	33,727
2 October 2003	Olympic Stadium	Djurgården	2–1 gg	AIK	Svenska Cupen quarter-final	8,980
18 March 2018	Friends Arena	AIK	0–2	Djurgården	Svenska Cupen semi-final	21,200
17 March 2024	Friends Arena	AIK	1–1, 3–4 pen	Djurgården	Svenska Cupen semi-final	36,910

=== Other ===
Date	Venue	Matches			Competition	Att.
Date	Venue	Team 1	Score	Team 2	Competition	Att.
10 October 1982	Olympic Stadium	Djurgården	1–2	AIK	Allsvenskan promotion/relegation play-off	11,713
16 October 1982	Råsunda	AIK	2–2	Djurgården	Allsvenskan promotion/relegation play-off	14,274
19 March 2008	Sporting Clube de Portugals, Alcochete, Portugal	AIK	2–0	Djurgården	Friendly	35

== Records ==
=== Biggest wins (5+ goals) ===
Margin	Result	Date	Event
6	AIK – Djurgårdens IF 0–6	1908	Stockholmsserien 1
6	Djurgårdens IF – AIK 0–6	2 June 1915	Svenska Serien
5	AIK – Djurgårdens IF 5–0	23 May 1947	Allsvenskan
5	AIK – Djurgårdens IF 6–1	3 July 1949	Svenska Cupen
5	AIK – Djurgårdens IF 5–0	2 September 1976	Allsvenskan

=== Longest runs ===
==== Most consecutive wins ====
Games	Club	Period
8	Djurgårdens IF	6 July 1902 – 16 August 1908
7	AIK	14 August 1936 – 13 July 1947
4	Djurgårdens IF	25 September 1909 – 29 September 1912

==== Most consecutive draws ====
Games	Period
4	10 November 1918 – 2 June 1920
4	21 August 1957 – 10 June 1959
4	6 July 1988 – 31 August 1989

==== Most consecutive matches without a draw ====
Games	Period
18	1899 – 14 September 1913
8	23 April 1969 – 11 May 1972
7	18 October 1914 – 29 October 1916
7	14 August 1936 – 13 July 1947

==== Longest undefeated runs ====
Games	Club	Period
15	AIK	10 August 1927 – 18 August 1950
12	Djurgårdens IF	17 May 1927 – 10 August 1957
11	AIK	8 May 2012 – 22 May 2017
8	AIK	6 July 1902 – 16 August 1908
8	Djurgårdens IF	10 November 1918 – 12 November 1922
8	AIK	22 May 1986 – 16 May 1990

==== Longest undefeated runs (league) ====
Games	Club	Period
15	AIK	8 May 2012 – 1 September 2019
13	AIK	10 August 1927 – 18 August 1950
12	Djurgårdens IF	17 May 1957 – 9 June 1965
11	AIK	17 May 1979 – 16 May 1990

==== Most consecutive matches without conceding a goal ====
Games	Club	Period
5	AIK	13 August 1986 – 11 May 1989
4	AIK	15 April 2018 – 1 September 2019
4	AIK	10 August 2015 – 22 April 2017
3	Djurgårdens IF	29 May 1906 – 12 June 1908
3	Djurgårdens IF	24 August 1967 – 4 September 1968
3	Djurgårdens IF	11 May 1978 – 17 May 1979
3	Djurgårdens IF	6 July 1988 – 11 May 1989

==== Most consecutive games scoring ====
Games	Club	Period
17	Djurgårdens IF	6 July 1902 – 18 October 1914
16	AIK	10 August 1927 – 22 May 1951
15	AIK	2 June 2003 – 3 October 2010

=== Most appearances ===
Rank	Player	Nationality	Club	League	Cup	Total
1	Sven Lindman	Sweden	Djurgården	25	0	25
2	Krister Nordin	Sweden	Djurgården/AIK	21	2	23
3	Tommy Berggren	Sweden	Djurgården	19	0	19
4	Björn Alkeby	Sweden	Djurgården	18	0	18
4	Daniel Tjernström	Sweden	AIK	16	2	18
4	Nils-Eric Johansson	Sweden	AIK	16	0	16
6	Håkan Stenbäck	Sweden	Djurgården	15	0	15
6	Gary Sundgren	Sweden	AIK	14	1	15
9	Martin Åslund	Sweden	Djurgården/AIK	11	3	14
9	Göran Göransson	Sweden	AIK	12	2	14
9	Gösta Nilsson	Sweden	AIK	14	0	14
12	Andreas Johansson	Sweden	Djurgården	11	2	13
12	Mats Rubarth	Sweden	AIK	11	2	13
12	Kjell Samuelsson	Sweden	Djurgården	13	0	13
12	Daniel Sjölund	Finland	Djurgården	12	1	13
12	Pa Dembo Touray	Gambia	Djurgården	12	1	13

=== Goalscorers ===
==== Top scorers ====
Rank	Player	Nationality	Club	League	Cup	Total
1	Yngve Leback	Sweden	AIK	7	0	7
2	Leif Skiöld	Sweden	AIK/Djurgården	5	0	5
3	Claes Cronqvist	Sweden	Djurgården	3	1	4
3	Sven Dahlkvist	Sweden	AIK	4	0	4
3	Mikael Martinsson	Sweden	Djurgården	4	0	4
3	Hans Nilsson	Sweden	Djurgården	4	0	4
3	Ingvar Olsson	Sweden	AIK	4	0	4
3	Pascal Simpson	Sweden	AIK	4	0	4
3	Jan-Erik Sjöberg	Sweden	Djurgården	4	0	4
3	Håkan Stenbäck	Sweden	Djurgården	4	0	4

==== Consecutive goalscoring ====
Rank	Player	Club	Consecutive matches	Total goals in the run	Start	End
1	(Sweden) Leif Skiöld	AIK/Djurgården	3	3	1959 Allsvenskan (10th matchday)	1960 Allsvenskan (4th matchday)
1	(Sweden) Pascal Simpson	AIK	3	3	1991 Mästerskapsserien (5th matchday)	1992 Allsvenskan (6th matchday)
1	(Sweden) Louay Chanko	Djurgården	3	3	2002 Allsvenskan (2nd matchday)	2002 Svenska Cupen (final)

==== Clean sheets ====
Since 28 September 2009

Rank	Player	Nationality	Club	League	Cup	Total
1	Oscar Linnér	Sweden	AIK	4	0	4
2	Patrik Carlgren	Sweden	AIK	3	0	3
3	Daniel Örlund	Sweden	AIK	2	0	2
3	Ivan Turina	Croatia	AIK	2	0	2
3	Daniel Örlund	Sweden	AIK	2	0	2
3	Pa Dembo Touray	Gambia	Djurgården	2	0	2
4	Kyriakos Stamatopoulos	Canada	AIK	1	0	1
4	Anders Isaksson	Sweden	Djurgården	0	1	1

== Shared player history ==
=== Transfers ===
- (Sweden) Bengt Rosenqvist (AIK to Djurgården)
- (Sweden) Gunnar Galin (AIK to Djurgården to AIK to Djurgården to AIK to Djurgården to AIK) (1927, 1928, 1929, 1931)
- (Sweden) Algot Haglund (Djurgården to AIK) (1928)
- (Sweden) Bertil Andersson (AIK to Djurgården to AIK to Djurgården) (1928, 1928, 1929)
- (Sweden) Hugo Söderström (Djurgården to AIK to Djurgården) (1928, 1928)
- (Sweden) Carl-Ottil Johansson (AIK to Djurgården) (1948)
- (Sweden) Bernt Brick (AIK to Djurgården) (1954)
- (Sweden) Leif Skiöld (AIK to Djurgården) (1960)
- (Sweden) Hans Nilsson (Djurgården to AIK on loan) (1966)
- (Sweden) Joacim Sjöström (Djurgården to AIK) (1988)
- (Socialist Federal Republic of Yugoslavia) Branko Marković (AIK to Djurgården) (1984)
- (Sweden) Krister Nordin (Djurgården to AIK) (1992)
- (Sweden) Jan Andersson (Djurgården to AIK) (1993)
- (Sweden) Patrik Hagman (Djurgården to AIK) (1994)
- (Sweden) Jesper Jansson (AIK to Djurgården) (1996)
- (Bosnia and Herzegovina) Nebojša Novaković (Djurgården to AIK) (1997)
- (Sweden) Pierre Gallo (AIK to Djurgården) (1998)
- (Sweden) Andreas Johansson (AIK to Djurgården) (2000)
- (Sweden) Sharbel Touma (Djurgården to AIK) (1999) (Note: Returned to Djurgården in 2010 after having played for Halmstad, Twente, Borussia Mönchengladbach and Iraklis.)
- (Nigeria) Kennedy Igboananike (Djurgården to AIK) (2012)

=== Played for both clubs ===
- (Sweden) Ulf Östlund (Djurgården to Hagalund to AIK) (1950)
- (Sweden) Lennart Pettersson (AIK to IFK Eskilstuna to Djurgården) (1951)
- (Sweden) Roland Magnusson (Djurgården to Altay to AIK) (1970)
- (Sweden) Ove Rübsamen (Djurgården to Helenelunds IK to AIK) (1977)
- (Sweden) Thomas Lundmark (AIK to IFK Eskilstuna to Djurgården) (1990)
- (Sweden) Bo Andersson (AIK to Vasalund to Djurgården) (1994)
- (Sweden) Anders Almgren (Djurgården to Vasalund to AIK) (1996)
- (Sweden) Pär Millqvist (Djurgården to IFK Göteborg to Örebro to Vasalund to AIK) (1996)
- (Sweden) Mikael Borgqvist (AIK to Spårvägen to Djurgården) (1998)
- (Sweden) Peter Hallström (AIK to Spånga to Värtan to Djurgården) (1998)
- (Sweden) Martin Åslund (Djurgården to IFK Norrköping to AIK) (1999)
- (Sweden) Anders Limpar (AIK to Colorado Rapids to Djurgården) (2000)
- (Sweden) Christer Mattiasson (AIK to Lillestrøm to Djurgården) (2001)
- (Sweden) Kevin Walker (AIK to GIF Sundsvall to Djurgården) (2015)

=== Played for one club, managed the other ===
- (Sweden) Kim Bergstrand (played for AIK, managed Djurgården)
- (Sweden) Kjell Jonevret (played for AIK, managed Djurgården)
- (Sweden) Per Kaufeldt (played for AIK, managed AIK and Djurgården)
- (Sweden) Putte Kock (played for AIK, managed Djurgården)
- (Sweden) Thomas Lagerlöf (played for AIK, managed Djurgården)
- (Sweden) Bo Petersson (played for AIK, managed AIK and Djurgården)

=== Managed both clubs ===
Manager	AIK career						Djurgårdens IF career					
Manager	Span	G^{1}	W	D	L	Win %	Span	G^{1}	W	D	L	Win %
(Sweden) Hans Backe	1994–1995	52	18	17	17	34.6	1982–1984	70	38	20	12	54.3
(Sweden) Per Kaufeldt	1934–1940; 1951–1956						1944–1950	124	59	15	50	47.6
(Sweden) Torsten Lindberg	1969–1970						1964–1966					
(England) George Raynor	1948–1952						1960	3	0	1	2	0.0
(Sweden) Bo Petersson	1979–1980						1993					
(Sweden) Tommy Söderberg	1991–1993						1986–1989	70	34	20	16	48.6
(England) Frank Soo	1958						1954–1955	22	14	5	3	63.6
(Hungary) Lajos Szendrődi	1960–1961						1957–1959	44	20	17	7	45.5

^{1} Only competitive matches are counted.

== See also ==
- Football derbies in Sweden
- Local derby
- Major football rivalries
- Sports rivalry
- Djurgårdens IF–Hammarby IF rivalry
- AIK Fotboll–Hammarby Fotboll rivalry
