= List of Djurgårdens IF Fotboll records and statistics =

Djurgårdens IF Fotboll is a Swedish professional football club based in Stockholm.

The list encompasses the major honours won by Djurgården, records set by the club, their managers and their players.

== Honours ==
=== Domestic ===
- Swedish Champions^{[A]}
  - Winners (12): 1912, 1915, 1917, 1920, 1954–1955, 1959, 1964, 1966, 2002, 2003, 2005, 2019

==== League ====
- Allsvenskan:
  - Winners (8): 1954–1955, 1959, 1964, 1966, 2002, 2003, 2005, 2019
  - Runners-up (4): 1962, 1967, 2001, 2022
- Superettan:
  - Winners (1): 2000
- Division 1 Norra:
  - Winners (3): 1987, 1994, 1998
  - Runners-up (1): 1997
- Svenska Serien:
  - Runners-up (1): 1911–1912

==== Cups ====
- Svenska Cupen:
  - Winners (5): 1989–1990, 2002, 2004, 2005, 2017–2018
  - Runners-up (5): 1951, 1974–1975, 1988–1989, 2013, 2024
- Svenska Mästerskapet:
  - Winners (4): 1912, 1915, 1917, 1920
  - Runners-up (7): 1904, 1906, 1909, 1910, 1913, 1916, 1919
- Allsvenskan play-offs:
  - Runners-up (1): 1988
- Corinthian Bowl:
  - Winners (1): 1910
  - Runners-up (2): 1908, 1911
- Rosenska Pokalen:
  - Runners-up (2): 1902
- Wicanderska Välgörenhetsskölden:
  - Winners (4): 1907, 1910, 1913, 1915
  - Runners-up (3): 1908, 1914, 1916

=== Doubles ===
- 2002: League and Svenska Cupen
- 2005: League and Svenska Cupen

== Player records ==
=== Appearances ===
- Most appearances in all competitions: Gösta Sandberg, 328
- Most league appearances: Gösta Sandberg, 322
- Most Allsvenskan appearances: Sven Lindman, 312
- Most cup appearances: Haris Radetinac, 42
- Most continental appearances: Haris Radetinac, 29
- Youngest first-team player: Alexander Andersson – 15 years, 24 days (against Elfsborg, Allsvenskan, 19 May 2025)
- Oldest first-team player: Björn Alkeby – 41 years, 43 days (against Ope IF, Division 1 Norra, 29 August 1993)
- Most consecutive appearances: Sven Lindman, 175 (1970–1977)

==== Most appearances ====
Competitive matches only, includes appearances as substitute. Numbers in brackets indicate goals scored.

#	Name	Years	League	Cup	Europe	Other	Total
1	(Sweden) Gösta Sandberg	1951–1966	322 (77)	0 (0)	6 (1)	0 (1)	328 (79)
2	(Sweden) Sven Lindman	1965–1968; 1969–1980	312 (49)	2 (0)	12 (0)	0 (0)	326 (49)
3	(Bosnia and Herzegovina) Haris Radetinac	2013–2024	241 (22)	42 (9)	29 (1)	0 (0)	312 (32)
4	(Sweden) Tommy Berggren	1968–1984	289 (54)	0 (0)	8 (0)	2 (1)	299 (55)
5	(Sweden) Jacob Une	2016–present	225 (9)	35 (5)	21 (0)	0 (0)	281 (14)
6	(Sweden) Björn Alkeby	1971–1982; 1993	265 (0)	0 (0)	9 (0)	2 (0)	276 (0)
7	(Sweden) Arne Arvidson	1952–1965	263 (0)	0 (0)	6 (0)	0 (0)	269 (0)
8	(Finland) Daniel Sjölund	2003–2012	205 (27)	20 (11)	10 (0)	10 (1)	245 (39)
9	(Sweden) Vito Knežević	1977–1988	236 (17)	0 (0)	0 (0)	6 (1)	242 (18)
10	(The Gambia) Pa Dembo Touray	2000–2011	195 (1)	16 (0)	14 (0)	12 (0)	237 (1)

=== Goalscorers ===
- Most goals in all competitions: Gösta Sandberg, 79
- Most league goals: Gösta Sandberg, 77
- Most Allsvenskan goals: Gösta Sandberg, 70
- Most cup goals: Andreas Johansson, 16
- Most continental goals: Joel Asoro, 8
- Most goals in a season: Leif Skiöld, 30 goals (in the 1961 season)
- Most league goals in a season: Leif Skiöld, 27 goals (in the 1961 season)
- Most goals in a single match: Leif Skiöld, 6 goals (against IFK Eskilstuna, Division 2 Svealand, 23 September 1961)
- Youngest goalscorer: Alexander Andersson – 16 years, 138 days (against Haninge, Svenska Cupen, 10 September 2026)
- Oldest goalscorer: Sven Lindman – 38 years, 53 days (against IFK Norrköping, Allsvenskan, 11 June 1980)

==== Top goalscorers ====
Competitive matches only. Numbers in brackets indicate appearances made.

#	Name	Years	League	Cup	Europe	Others	Total
1	(Sweden) Gösta Sandberg	1951–1966	77 (322)	0 (0)	1 (6)	1 (0)	79 (328)
2	(Sweden) John Eriksson	1951–1960	69 (120)	0 (0)	3 (3)	0 (0)	72 (123)
3	(Sweden) Andreas Johansson	2000–2005; 2013–2014	50 (172)	16 (30)	4 (14)	0 (3)	70 (219)
4	(Sweden) Leif Eriksson	1960–1966	62 (117)	0 (0)	0 (2)	2 (0)	64 (119)
4	(Sweden) Hans Nilsson	1962–1973	62 (165)	0 (1)	2 (3)	0 (0)	64 (169)
6	(Sweden) Leif Skiöld	1960–1964	60 (75)	0 (0)	0 (0)	3 (0)	63 (75)
7	(Sweden) Tommy Berggren	1968–1984	54 (289)	0 (0)	0 (8)	1 (2)	55 (299)
8	(Sweden) Stefan Rehn	1984–1989; 2000–2002	49 (186)	3 (14)	0 (6)	0 (4)	52 (210)
9	(Sweden) Sven Tumba	1951–1961	50 (86)	0 (0)	0 (1)	1 (0)	51 (87)
10	(Sweden) Bo Andersson	1994–1995; 1996–1997	41 (87)	7 (0)	2 (0)	0 (0)	50 (87)

=== International ===
- First capped players: Ivar Friberg, Erik Lavass, Samuel Lindqvist, and Bertil Nordenskjöld for Sweden v. Norway (11 September 1910)
- Most capped Djurgården player for Sweden while playing for the club: Gösta Sandberg, 52 caps whilst an Djurgården player
- First player to play in a World Cup: Hasse Jeppson for Sweden v. Italy (25 June 1950)
- First player to play in a World Cup final: Sigge Parling for Sweden v. Brazil (29 June 1958)
- First player to play in a European Championship: Andreas Isaksson for Sweden v. Bulgaria (14 June 2004)
- First player to play in an Olympic tournament: Ragnar Wicksell for Sweden v. Netherlands (29 June 1912)

=== Top Ten Transfers ===
==== Record transfer fees paid ====
Player	From	Fee	Date
(Brazil) Thiago Quirino	Atlético Mineiro	14 million SEK	18 January 2006
(Sweden) Mattias Jonson	Norwich City	9.6 million SEK (£0.7 million)	15 July 2005

==== Record transfer fees received ====
Player	To	Fee	Date
(Sweden) Marcus Danielson	Dalian Professional	50 million SEK (€5.0 million)	28 February 2020
(Liberia) Sam Johnson	Wuhan Zall	42 million SEK (€4.2 million)	14 July 2016
(Kenya) Michael Olunga	Guizhou Hengfeng	40 million SEK (£3.3 million)	25 January 2017
(Sweden) Felix Beijmo	Werder Bremen	30 million SEK (€3.0 million)	13 June 2018
(Sweden) Tobias Hysén	Sunderland	23 million SEK (£1.7 million)	23 August 2006
(Denmark) Søren Larsen	Schalke 04	22 million SEK (€2.3 million)	30 July 2005
(Zimbabwe) Tino Kadewere	Le Havre AC	20 million SEK (€2.0 million)	27 July 2018
(Sweden) Kim Källström	Rennes	17.9 million SEK (€2 million)	12 December 2003
(The Gambia) Omar Colley	Genk	19 million SEK (€1.7 million)	15 August 2016
(Ghana) Daniel Amartey	FC Copenhagen	17 million SEK (14 million DKK)	18 June 2014
(Sweden) Andreas Isaksson	Rennes	15.5 million SEK (€1.7 million)	24 June 2006

== Managerial records ==
- First full-time manager:
- Longest-serving manager: Einar Svensson – 9 years (1935 to 1944)

== Club records ==
=== Matches ===
==== Firsts ====
- First match: AIK 2–1 Djurgården, Stockholm Idrottsförbunds Tävlingar, 16 July 1899
- First match at Tranebergs IP: Djurgården 3–1 AIK, Svenska Serien, 1 October 1911
- First Allsvenskan match: Djurgården 3–2 Stattena IF, 31 July 1927
- First match at Stockholm Olympic Stadium:
- First match at Råsunda Stadium:
- First Svenska Cupen match: IF Verdandi 2–3 Djurgården, 14 June 1942
- First European match: Djurgården 0–0 Gwardia Warszawa, European Cup, 20 September 1955
- First match at Tele2 Arena: Djurgården 1–2 IFK Norrköping, Allsvenskan, 21 July 2013

==== Record wins ====
- Record win:
  - 13–0 (against Norrmalms IK, Svenska Bollspelsförbundets serie, 14 September 1902)
  - 14–1 (against Delsbo IF, Svenska Cupen, 22 August 1996)
- Record league win: 11–1 (against IFK Eskilstuna, Division 2 Svealand, 23 September 1961, against IFK Sunne, Division 2 Svealand, 1 October 1961)
- Record Allsvenskan win: 9–1 (against Hammarby IF, Allsvenskan, 13 August 1990)
- Record Svenska Cupen win: 14–1 (against Delsbo IF, 22 August 1996)
- Record European win: 8–0 (against Apollon Limassol, UEFA Intertoto Cup, 29 June 1996)
- Record away win: 14–1 (against Delsbo IF, Svenska Cupen, 22 August 1996)

==== Record defeats ====
- Record defeat: 1–11 (against IFK Norrköping, Allsvenskan, 14 October 1945)
- Record league defeat: 1–11 (against IFK Norrköping, 14 October 1945)
- Record Svenska Cupen defeat: 1–6 (against AIK, 3 July 1949)
- Record European defeat: 0–6 (against SC Levski Sofia, European Cup, 1965–66)
- Record home defeat:
- Record away defeat: 1–11 (against IFK Norrköping, Allsvenskan, 14 October 1945)

==== Record consecutive results ====
- Most consecutive wins overall: 14 (24 July 2000 to 8 October 2000)
- Most consecutive league wins: 12 (13 September 1948 to 29 May 1949)
- Most consecutive wins in Allsvenskan: 7 (7 October 2002 to 21 April 2003)
- Most consecutive wins coming from behind:
- Most consecutive draws: 5 (two times: 20 May 1965 to 9 June 1965, 8 May 2012 to 23 May 2012)
- Most consecutive losses overall:
- Most consecutive league losses: 6 (three times: 18 April to 14 May 1937, 18 June to 17 August 1986, 11 July to 17 August 2009)
- Most consecutive matches unbeaten: 19 (6 June 1948 to 29 May 1949)
- Most consecutive matches unbeaten in the league: 19 (6 June 1948 to 29 May 1949)
- Most consecutive matches unbeaten in Allsvenskan: 17 (19 April to 6 September 1959)

=== Goals ===
- Most league goals scored in a season: 77 in 22 matches, Division 2 Svealand, 1961
- Fewest league goals scored in a season: 3 in 6 matches, Fyrkantsserien, 1918
- Most league goals conceded in a season: 66 in 22 matches, Allsvenskan, 1927–28
- Fewest league goals conceded in a season: 1 in 6 matches, Serien, 1902

=== Points ===
- Most points in a league season:
  - Two points for a win: 42 (in 33 matches in 1957–58, Allsvenskan)
  - Three points for a win: 63 (in 30 matches in 2000, Superettan)
- Fewest points in a league season:
  - Two points for a win: 2 (in 6 matches in 1918, Svenska Serien)
  - Three points for a win: 24 (in 26 matches in 1999, Allsvenskan)

=== Attendances ===
Only competitive first-team matches are considered.

- Highest home attendance: 48,894 (against IFK Göteborg, Allsvenskan, 11 October 1959) at Råsunda Stadium
- Highest attendance at Stockholm Olympic Stadium: 21,995 (against AIK, Allsvenskan, 16 August 1946)
- Lowest attendance at Stockholm Olympic Stadium: 0 (against Halmstads BK, Allsvenskan, 15 September 1996; against Helsingborgs IF, Allsvenskan, 21 March 2010)
- Highest attendance at Tele2 Arena: 27,798 (against IFK Norrköping, Allsvenskan, 21 July 2013)
- Lowest attendance at Tele2 Arena: 2,798 (against Halmstads BK, Svenska Cupen, 16 March 2014)
