= 1900 Rosenska Pokalen =

Rosenska Pokalen 1900, part of the 1900 Swedish football season, was the second Rosenska Pokalen tournament played. Seven teams participated and six matches were played, the first 29 August 1900 and the last 2 September 1900. Gefle IF won the tournament ahead of runners-up AIK.

== Participating clubs ==

Club	Last season	First season in tournament	First season of current spell
AIK	Runners-up	1899	1899
Djurgårdens IF	Semi-final	1899	1899
Gefle IF	Winners	1899	1899
IF Sleipner	Did not participate	1900	1900
IF Swithiod	Did not participate	1900	1900
Östermalms IK	Did not participate	1900	1900
Östermalms SK	Did not participate	1900	1900

== Tournament results ==
1st round

29 August 1900

IF Sleipner	w.o.	Östermalms IK

?, Stockholm

2nd round

30 August 1900

IF Sleipner	2–0	Östermalms SK

?, Stockholm

3rd round

31 August 1900

IF Swithiod	1–0	IF Sleipner

?, Stockholm

4th round

1 September 1900

AIK	1–0	IF Swithiod

?, Stockholm

Semi-final

2 September 1900

AIK	2–0	Djurgårdens IF

?, Stockholm

Final

2 September 1900

Gefle IF	9–0	AIK

Lindarängen, Stockholm
