= 1899 Rosenska Pokalen =

Rosenska Pokalen 1899, part of the 1899 Swedish football season, was the first Rosenska Pokalen tournament played. Three teams participated and two matches were played, both on 24 September 1899. Gefle IF won the tournament ahead of runners-up AIK.

== Participating clubs ==

Club	Last season	First season in tournament	First season of current spell
AIK	No tournament	1899	1899
Djurgårdens IF	No tournament	1899	1899
Gefle IF	No tournament	1899	1899

== Tournament results ==
Semi-final

September 24, 1899

Gefle IF	3–0	Djurgårdens IF

Lindarängen, Stockholm

Final

September 24, 1899

Gefle IF	2–0	AIK

Lindarängen, Stockholm
