= Lennart Pettersson =

Lennart Pettersson may refer to:

- Lennart Pettersson (pentathlete) (born 1951), Swedish Air Force officer and modern pentathlete
- Lennart Pettersson (footballer), Swedish footballer
