= Leif Strandh =

Swedish footballer (born 1967)

Personal information
- Full name: Bo Leif Strandh
- Date of birth: 14 April 1967 (age 59)
- Place of birth: Stockholm, Sweden
- Positions: Midfielder; forward

Youth career
- IFK Stockholm
- 1981–1984: Hammarby IF

Senior career*
Years	Team	Apps	(Gls)
1985–1990	Hammarby IF	62	(5)
1991–1992	Djurgårdens IF	14	(0)
1992–1997	Hammarby IF	135	(37)
Total		211	(42)

International career
1982–1983	Sweden U17	14	(5)
1984–1985	Sweden U19	15	(6)
- * Club domestic league appearances and goals

Leif Strandh (born 14 April 1967) is a Swedish former footballer, best known for representing Hammarby IF. He is the director of football at Damallsvenskan club Piteå IF.

== Club career ==
=== First stint at Hammarby IF ===
He started to play football as a youngster with local club IFK Stockholm, before moving to Hammarby IF at age 13. Between 1982 and 1985, Strandh was a regular member of the Sweden U17's and Sweden U19's. In 1985, at age 18, Strandh made his senior debut for Hammarby IF in a 1–1 away draw against IFK Norrköping in Allsvenskan. Getting known as technically gifted and pacy winger, Strandh established himself as a starter in 1988, as the club suffered a relegation from the first tier.

Competing in Division 2 in 1989, Hammarby secured a promotion by scoring a goal in stoppage time in the very last game of the season, winning 6–0 away against Karlstad BK. They then surpassed contender Vasalunds IF, that had a one-point advantage and were up by five in goal difference before the ultimate round, since they only managed to draw 0–0 against IFK Luleå. Amongst the Hammarby supporters, it soon became known as "Undret i Karlstad" (in English: "the Miracle in Karlstad"). Strandh scored one goal and provided one assist in the game.

In 1990, Strandh competed in Allsvenskan with Hammarby, but the club was relegated once again, after finishing at the foot of the table. Strandh sought a move elsewhere, but chairman Arne Larsson was reluctant to negotiate with other clubs. He attracted interest from Norwegian club Tromsø IL, but finally transferred to rivals Djurgårdens IF.

=== Djurgårdens IF ===
In 1991, Strandh had difficulties establishing himself as a regular with Djurgården, and he only played 14 league games in Allsvenskan throughout the season. At the end of the season, Djurgården had financial difficulties and was unable to pay the remaining transfer fee to Hammarby, which ended in an agreement where Strandh instead returned to his former club.

=== Return to Hammarby ===
Back at Hammarby in 1992, the side had a mediocre season in the second tier. In 1993, Strandh played an integral part, together with keeper Per Fahlström, winger Jens Gustafson and prolific goalscorer Hans Eskilsson, as Hammarby won Division 1. The club ultimately finished six points ahead of contender Vasalunds IF.

Back in Allsvenskan 1994, Hammarby finished 12th in the table, just above the relegation zone, but won the first Swedish Futsal Championship the same year. At the end of the year, Strandh attracted interest from fellow Allsvenskan club IFK Norrköping, but ultimately turned down a move.

The following season, in 1995, Hammarby was relegated from the first tier, even though the club had brought in players like Dan Sahlin, Kim Bergstrand and Jean-Paul Vonderburg. Pundits blamed manager Tommy Davidsson for opting to play a much to defensive style. He stayed with Hammarby for two more seasons in the second division. The side won a promotion in 1997, but Strandh left the club at the end of the year after not being offered a new contract. Strandh went on unsuccessful trials with Chinese club Guangzhou Apollo and Scottish side Motherwell, but instead continued to play as an amateur in the lower Swedish divisions with local clubs Värtans IK, Bagarmossen & Bellevue IK and FC Café Opera.

== Managerial career ==
After his playing career had ended, Strandh was briefly the head coach of Piteå IF's men's team in the Swedish lower division. In 2011, he was appointed as director of football of their women's team in Damallsvenskan, Sweden's highest division. He led Piteå IF to a surprising Swedish Champion title in 2018.
