= Göran Göransson =

Swedish footballer and manager

Personal information
- Full name: Göran Erik Göransson
- Date of birth: 7 May 1956 (age 70)
- Place of birth: Stockholm, Sweden
- Positions: Defender; midfielder

Youth career
- 1964–1967: Vällingby AIK
- 1968–1969: Djurgårdens IF
- 1970–1973: AIK

Senior career*
Years	Team	Apps	(Gls)
1974–1986	AIK	272	(15)
1987–1989	Väsby		
1990	AIK	20	(0)

International career
1973–1974	Sweden U19	11	(0)
1975–1977	Sweden U21	11	(0)

Managerial career
- 1990–1991: AIK (assistant)
- 1992: IFK Österåker
- 1994–1995: Täby IS
- 1996: Hammarby
- 1998: Väsby IK
- 1999–2001: Sweden U21
- * Club domestic league appearances and goals

Göran Erik Göransson (born 7 May 1956) is a Swedish former footballer and manager who most notably played for AIK and managed the Sweden U21 team. He made 363 official appearances for AIK, helping them win two Svenska Cupen titles and finishing first during the 1983 regular Allsvenskan season.

== Club career ==
=== AIK ===
Göransson made his AIK debut at only 17 years of age on 13 April 1974 against GAIS, as one of the youngest debutants ever for the club. He scored his first league goal for the club in a derby against Djurgårdens IF on 10 June 1976. In 1976, he helped the team win the 1975–76 Svenska Cupen title. During the 1983 Allsvenskan season, he led his team to the regular season title, before IFK Göteborg were crowned Swedish Champions after eliminating AIK in the semi-finals of the 1983 Allsvenskan Play-offs. In 1985, Göransson won his second Svenska Cupen title with AIK.

=== Väsby IK ===
After the 1986 Allsvenskan season Göransson left AIK for Väsby IK, where he spent three seasons, helping the team win promotion to Division 1 in 1987.

=== Return to AIK and retirement ===
Göransson returned to AIK for one last season ahead of the 1990 Allsvenskan season, and played in 20 league games as AIK finished 8th in the table.

In total, Göransson made 363 official appearances for AIK, which for a long time was a club record. He has since been overtaken by Daniel Tjernström (395 games) and Per Karlsson (396 games as of 16 July 2020).

== International career ==
Göransson made his debut for the Sweden U19 team in a 2–0 win against the Netherlands on 19 September 1973. He debuted for the Sweden U21 team on 2 September 1975 in a 2–0 win against Finland.

Göransson was close to making his debut for the senior Sweden national team in both 1977 and 1979, but never fielded.

== Career statistics ==
Club	Season	Division	League		Svenska Cupen		Europe		Allsvenskan play-offs		Other		Total	
Club	Season	Division	Apps	Goals	Apps	Goals	Apps	Goals	Apps	Goals	Apps	Goals	Apps	Goals
AIK	1974	Allsvenskan	4	0			—		—		—			
AIK	1975	Allsvenskan	11	0			2^{[b]}	0	—		—			
AIK	1976	Allsvenskan	26	2			4^{[c]}	0	—		—			
AIK	1977	Allsvenskan	26	1			—		—		—			
AIK	1978	Allsvenskan	26	3			—		—		—			
AIK	1979	Allsvenskan	26	0			—		—		—			
AIK	1980	Division 2 Norra	24	2			—		—		—			
AIK	1981	Allsvenskan	20	2			—		—		—			
AIK	1982	Allsvenskan	22	1			—		—		2^{[a]}	0		
AIK	1983	Allsvenskan	21	1			—		4	1	—			
AIK	1984	Allsvenskan	22	1			5^{[b][c]}	0	2	0	—			
AIK	1985	Allsvenskan	22	2			4^{[c][d]}	2	—		—			
AIK	1986	Allsvenskan	22	0			—		4	0	—			
Väsby IK	1987	Division 2 Mellersta					—		—		—			
Väsby IK	1988	Division 1 Norra					—		—		—			
Väsby IK	1989	Division 1 Norra					—		—		—			
AIK	1990	Allsvenskan	20	0			—		—		—			
Club totals		AIK	292	15			15	2	10	1	2	0	363	23
Club totals		Väsby IK					—		—		—			
Career totals							15	2	10	1	2	0		

^{[a]} Appearances in the 1982 Relegation play-offs.

^{[b]} Appearances in the UEFA Cup.

^{[c]} Appearances in the UEFA Intertoto Cup.

^{[d]} Appearances in the UEFA Cup Winners' Cup.

== Honours ==
AIK

- Allsvenskan: 1983
- Division 2 Norra: 1980
- Svenska Cupen: 1975–76, 1984–85

Väsby IK

- Division 2 Mellersta: 1987
