= 1901 Rosenska Pokalen =

Rosenska Pokalen 1901, part of the 1901 Swedish football season, was the third Rosenska Pokalen tournament played. Eight teams participated and seven matches were played, the first 11 August 1901 and the last 1 September 1901. No team was declared winners of the tournament.

== Participating clubs ==

Club	Last season	First season in tournament	First season of current spell
AIK	Runners-up	1899	1899
Djurgårdens IF	Semi-final	1899	1899
Gefle IF	Winners	1899	1899
IF Sleipner	3rd round	1900	1900
Stockholms IK	Did not participate	1901	1901
IK Svea	Did not participate	1901	1901
IF Swithiod	4th round	1900	1900
Östermalms SK	2nd round	1900	1900

== Tournament results ==
1st round

11 August 1901

IF Swithiod	1–0	Östermalms SK

?, Stockholm

11 August 1901

AIK	7–0	IK Svea

?, Stockholm

11 August 1901

Djurgårdens IF	1–0	Stockholms IK

?, Stockholm

1st round B

18 August 1901

Östermalms SK	1–0	IF Sleipner

?, Stockholm

Semi-finals

31 August 1901

AIK	2–1	IF Swithiod

?, Stockholm

1 September 1901

Gefle IF	2–1	Djurgårdens IF

?, Stockholm

Final

1 September 1901

Gefle IF	1–1	AIK

Idrottsparken, Stockholm
