= 1899 in Swedish football =

The 1899 season in Swedish football, starting January 1899 and ending December 1899:

== Honours ==
=== Official titles ===
Title	Team	Reason
Swedish Champions 1899	Örgryte IS	Winners of Svenska Mästerskapet

=== Competitions ===
Level	Competition	Team
Championship Cup	Svenska Mästerskapet 1899	Örgryte IS
Cup competition	Rosenska Pokalen 1899	Gefle IF

== Domestic results ==
=== Svenska Mästerskapet 1899 ===
Final

6 August 1899

Örgryte IS	3–0	Göteborgs FF

Idrottsplatsen, Gothenburg

=== Rosenska Pokalen 1899 ===
Final

24 September 1899

Gefle IF	2–0	AIK

Lindarängen, Stockholm
