= 1900 in Swedish football =

The 1900 season in Swedish football, starting January 1900 and ending December 1900:

== Events ==
- 1900-07-29 – AIK wins their first Swedish Championship ever, and the first of the new century.

== Honours ==
=== Official titles ===
Title	Team	Reason
Swedish Champions 1900	AIK	Winners of Svenska Mästerskapet

=== Competitions ===
Level	Competition	Team
Championship Cup	Svenska Mästerskapet 1900	AIK
Cup competition	Rosenska Pokalen 1900	Gefle IF

== Domestic results ==
=== Svenska Mästerskapet 1900 ===
Final

29 July 1900

AIK	1–0	Örgryte IS

Lindarängen, Stockholm

=== Rosenska Pokalen 1900 ===
Final

2 September 1900

Gefle IF	9–0	AIK

Lindarängen, Stockholm
