= Folke Holmberg =

Swedish footballer

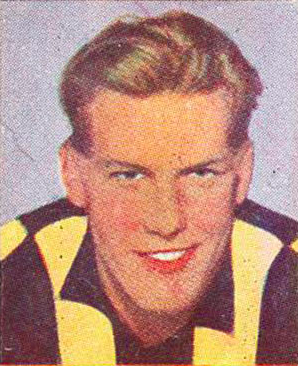
- Folke Holmberg in 1954.

Personal information
- Full name: Folke Holmberg
- Date of birth: 30 January 1927
- Place of birth: Stockholm, Sweden
- Date of death: 22 February 2015 (aged 88)
- Place of death: Stockholm, Sweden
- Position: Forward

Youth career
- 1942–1946: Hammarby IF

Senior career*
Years	Team	Apps	(Gls)
1946–1951	Hammarby IF	86	(69)
1951–1953	Djurgårdens IF	24	(12)
1953–1957	Hammarby IF	57	(20)
Total		167	(101)

International career
1951	Sweden	1	(0)
- * Club domestic league appearances and goals

Folke "Hinken" Holmberg (30 January 1927 – 22 February 2015) was a Swedish football player, best known for representing Hammarby IF.

== Club career ==
=== Hammarby IF ===
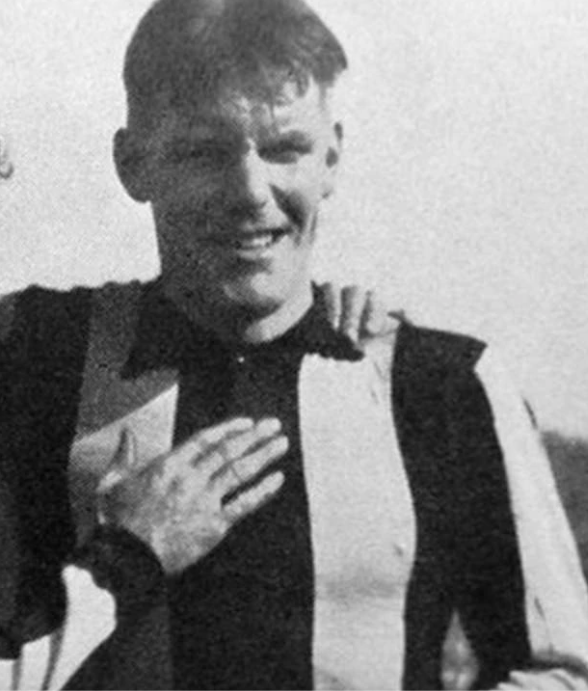
Holmberg was a prolific goalscorer for Hammarby IF.

Holmberg made his debut at age 18 for Hammarby IF in Division 2, Sweden's second tier.

In 1946–47, Hammarby finished last in Division 2, and got relegated to Division 4 due to a restructuring of the Swedish league system.

Holmberg decided to stay with the club and led the club to several promotions. He became known as a physically gifted player and prolific goalscorer in the lower divisions. When he left the club in 1951, Hammarby was back in Division 2, and Holmberg had scored a total of 69 goals in 86 league games.

=== Djurgårdens IF ===
In 1951, Holmberg moved to rivals Djurgårdens IF in Allsvenskan, the highest domestic league. He went on to make 24 appearances for the side during the next two seasons and scored 12 goals.

=== Return to Hammarby ===
Holmberg returned to Hammarby before the 1953–54 season and led the side to a promotion to Allsvenskan. After three seasons with Hammarby in the highest domestic league, Holmberg left the club again in 1957, having scored 20 goals in 57 appearances.

In the 1960s, he made a brief comeback as the player-manager of Stureby SK in the lower divisions.

== International career ==
On 11 November 1951, Holmberg won his first and only cap for Sweden, in a 1–1 friendly away draw against Italy.

== Personal life ==
His son Lars-Ove Holmberg also played for Hammarby from 1968 to 1973. Folke Holmberg died on 22 February 2015, aged 88.
