= Volker Tönsfeldt =

German footballer

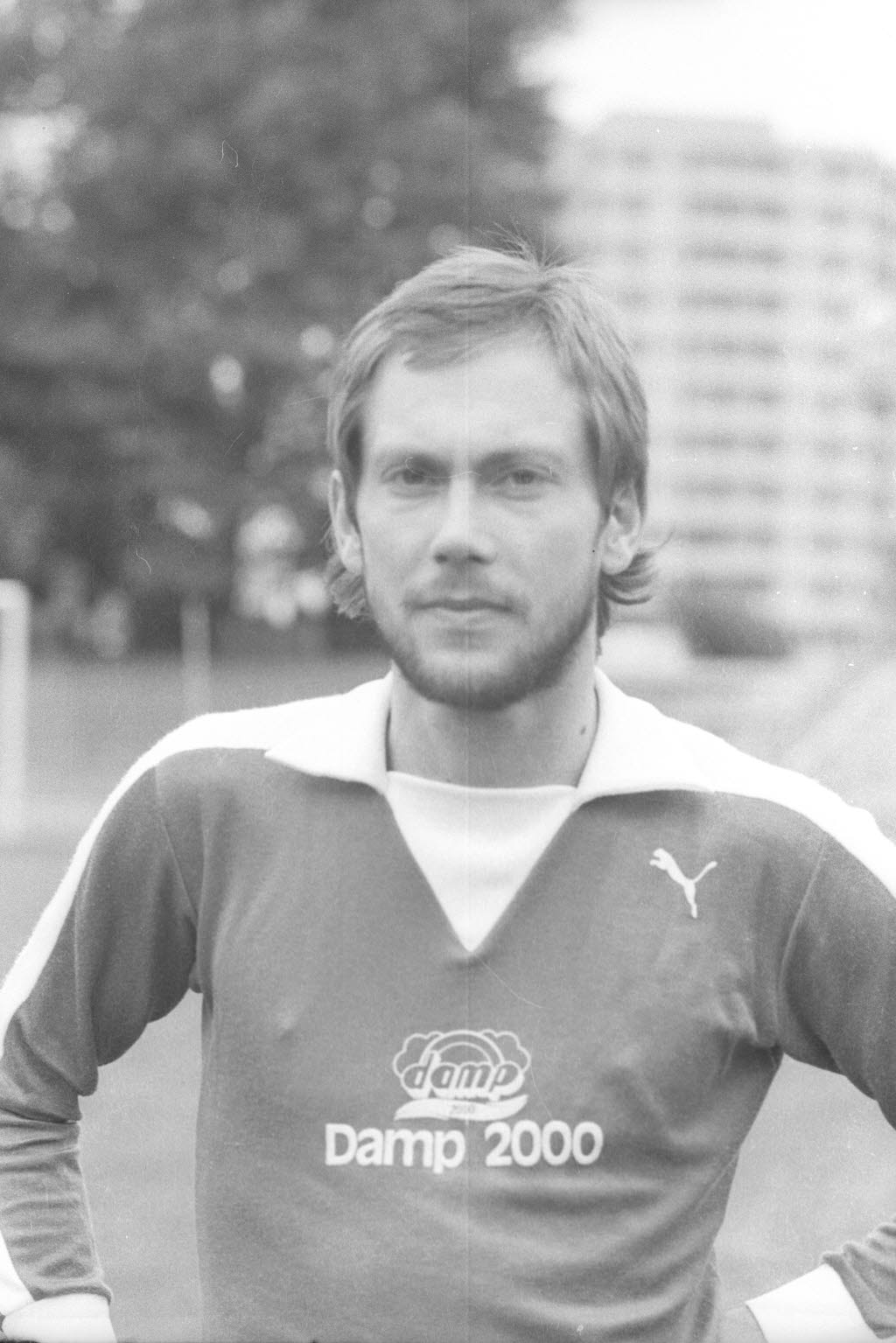
- Tönsfeldt in 1978

Personal information
- Date of birth: 24 November 1952 (age 73)
- Position: Forward

Senior career*
Years	Team	Apps	(Gls)
1978–1980	Holstein Kiel	52	(10)
1980–1982	Djurgårdens IF	32	(0)
Total		84	(0)
- * Club domestic league appearances and goals

Volker Tönsfeldt (born 24 November 1952) is a German former professional footballer who played as a forward.

== Career ==
Tönsfeldt played for Holstein Kiel between 1978 and 1980. In 1980, he joined Djurgårdens IF. Tönsfeldt made 22 Allsvenskan matches for Djurgårdens IF.
