= Bo Petersson =

Swedish footballer and manager

Personal information
- Full name: Bo Ingvar Petersson
- Date of birth: 10 July 1946 (age 80)
- Place of birth: Kalmar, Sweden
- Position: Midfielder

Youth career
- 1954–1966: Djurgårdens IF

Senior career*
Years	Team	Apps	(Gls)
1966–1967	Älvsjö AIK		
1968–1969	Råsunda IS		
1970–1975	Spårvägens GoIF		
1976	Vasalund IF		
1977	AIK	16	(2)
1978	IFK Östersund		
1979	Visby AIK		
1980	Danderyds SK		
1981–1982	IFK Östersund		

Managerial career
- 1970–1975: Spårvägens GoIF
- 1978: IFK Östersund
- 1979–1980: AIK
- 1981–1982: IFK Östersund
- 1983–1984: Vasalund IF
- 1985–1987: Spårvägens GoIF
- 1988–1990: Vasalund IF
- 1991: Tromsø
- 1992: Spårvägens FF
- 1993: Djurgården
- 1994: IF Brommapojkarna
- 1995: FC Plavi Team
- 1996–1997: Kalamata
- 1997: Västerås SK
- 1998–2001: Enköping
- 2002: Assyriska
- 2003–2004: PAS Giannina
- 2004: Vasalund/Essinge IF
- 2004: Enköping
- 2005: Vasalund/Essinge IF
- 2007: Enköping
- * Club domestic league appearances and goals

Bo Petersson (born 10 July 1946 in Kalmar) is a Swedish football manager and former football player.

== Career ==
He played for Älvsjö AIK, Råsunda IS, Spårvägens GoIF, Vasalund IF, AIK, IFK Östersund, Visby AIK and Danderyds SK.

After he retired from playing he later went into coaching. He coached Spårvägens FF, IFK Östersund, AIK, IFK Östersund, Vasalund IF, Tromsø IL, Djurgårdens IF, IF Brommapojkarna, FC Plavi Team, PAE Kalamata, Västerås SK, Enköpings SK, Assyriska, PAS Giannina and Vasalund/Essinge IF. Nowadays, Petersson works as an expert at the TV channel Viasat.

Bo Petersson is the son of Ingvar Petersson.
