= Ingvar Petersson =

Swedish footballer

Personal information
- Full name: Bror Ingvar Petersson
- Date of birth: 3 September 1922
- Place of birth: Kalmar, Sweden
- Date of death: 21 February 2002 (aged 79)
- Place of death: Solna, Sweden
- Position: Midfielder

Senior career*
Years	Team	Apps	(Gls)
- Djurgårdens IF

International career
1953	Sweden B	1	(0)
- * Club domestic league appearances and goals

Bror Ingvar Petersson (3 September 1922 in Kalmar, Sweden — 21 February 2002 in Solna, Sweden) was a Swedish footballer who played as a midfielder. He made 111 Allsvenskan appearances for Djurgårdens IF.

He is the father of footballer Bo Petersson.

== Honours ==
Djurgårdens IF

- Allsvenskan: 1954–55
