= Jan Sjöström =

Swedish footballer and manager (1948–2013)

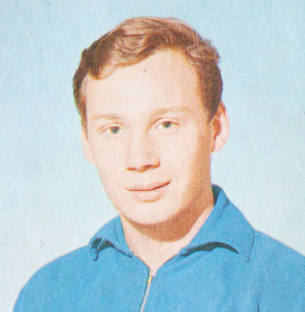
- Sjöström in 1969

Personal information
- Full name: Jan Enar Christer Sjöström
- Date of birth: 10 April 1948
- Place of birth: Härnösand, Sweden
- Date of death: 12 September 2013 (aged 65)
- Place of death: Stockholm, Sweden
- Position: Forward

Youth career
- 1963–1965: Sandåkerns SK

Senior career*
Years	Team	Apps	(Gls)
1965–1968	IFK Göteborg	26	(11)
1969–1979	Hammarby IF	237	(81)
Total		263	(92)

International career
1965–1966	Sweden U19	9	(9)
1970–1975	Sweden U21	10	(2)
1974	Sweden B	1	(1)
1972–1974	Sweden	8	(0)

Managerial career
- 1979–1980: Nyköpings BIS
- Skellefteå FF
- 1984–1986: BK Häcken
- 1987: Kalmar FF
- Spårvägens FF
- Älta IF
- Vagnhärads SK
- Topkapi IF
- Enebybergs IF
- Bromstens IK
- Akropolis IF
- * Club domestic league appearances and goals

Jan Enar Christer "Janne" Sjöström (10 April 1948 – 12 September 2013) was a Swedish football player and manager, best known for representing Hammarby IF. During his international career between 1972 and 1974, he won eight caps for Sweden.

== Early life ==
Sjöström was born in Härnösand, but grew up in Umeå. He started playing football with the local club Sandåkerns SK as a youngster, and made his debut for their senior team at the age of 14 in the Swedish lower divisions.

== Club career ==
=== IFK Göteborg ===
In 1965, at the age of 17, Sjöström joined IFK Göteborg in Allsvenskan, as his family had moved to the city, and he was promoted to the senior squad a year later.

In 1968, Sjöström broke into the side as a regular and scored seven goals in 17 league fixtures as the club finished 9th in the table. At the end of the season, Sjöström decided to leave the club to pursue his studies in Stockholm.

=== Hammarby IF ===
In 1969, Sjöström joined Hammarby IF in Division 2, and helped the club to win an immediate promotion back to the top tier.

Back in Allsvenskan, Hammarby was placed at the foot of the table after eight rounds in July 1970, but the club managed to go practically unbeaten through the rest of the campaign, eventually finishing 5th in the table. Sjöström established himself as one of Hammarby's key players together with Tom Turesson, Kenneth Ohlsson and Ronnie Hellström. He became known as a physical forward with a powerful shot, being a prolific goalscorer, although prone to injuries.

Between 1971 and 1975, Hammarby consistently finished mid-table in Allsvenskan, being unable to produce any sort of challenge for the Swedish champion title. Ahead of the 1976 season, Sjöström was on the verge of joining AS Cannes in the French Ligue 2, but the deal fell through in the last minute. In 1977, Hammarby reached the final of Svenska Cupen, the main domestic cup, but lost 0–1 to Östers IF.

Sjöström decided to retire from football at the end of 1979, aged 31. In total, Sjöström made 237 league appearances and scored 81 goals for the club. He is Hammarby's second best ever goalscorer in the top division Allsvenskan, behind Billy Ohlsson, and was voted in 2004 as the club's 24th biggest profile throughout its history.

== International career ==
Sjöström featured regularly for the Swedish U19's and U21's, and took part in the 1972 UEFA European Under-23 Championship where Sweden was knocked out by Czechoslovakia in the quarter-finals.

He made his senior debut for Sweden on 26 April 1972, aged 24, in a 1–1 draw against Switzerland in an away friendly. In total, Sjöström won eight caps for his country the next two years, but did not feature in any competitive fixtures.

== Managerial career ==
After his playing career had ended, Sjöström worked as a football manager. He was most notably the head coach of BK Häcken between 1984–1986 and Kalmar FF during a brief period in 1987.

== Personal life ==
Until his death, Sjöström was in a long-term relationship with fellow former footballer Gunilla Paijkull. Sjöström died on 12 September 2013, at age 65, due to an undisclosed condition.

== Career statistics ==
=== International ===
Appearances and goals by national team and year
National team	Year	Apps	Goals
Sweden	1972	2	0
Sweden	1973	4	0
Sweden	1974	2	0
Total		8	0
