= Mika Leinonen =

Swedish footballer

Personal information
- Date of birth: 5 October 1957 (age 69)

Senior career*
Years	Team	Apps	(Gls)
- Djurgården
- * Club domestic league appearances and goals

Mika Leinonen (born 5 October 1957) is a Swedish retired footballer. Leinonen made 30 Allsvenskan appearances for Djurgården and scored 0 goals.
