= Lars-Ove Johansson =

Swedish footballer (1938–2019)

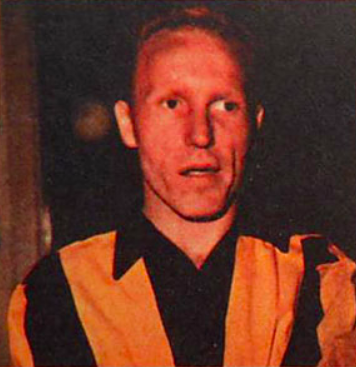
- Johansson with Hammarby IF in 1958.

Personal information
- Full name: Lars-Ove Johansson
- Date of birth: 14 November 1938
- Place of birth: Härnösand, Sweden
- Date of death: 11 November 2019 (aged 80)
- Position: Forward

Youth career
- 1953–1956: IF Älgarna

Senior career*
Years	Team	Apps	(Gls)
1956–1964	Hammarby IF	116	(65)
1965–1966	IFK Västerås		

International career
1956–1961	Sweden U21	6	(8)
1960	Sweden B	1	(1)
1961	Sweden	1	(0)
- * Club domestic league appearances and goals

Lars-Ove "Larsa" Johansson (14 November 1938 – 11 November 2019) was a Swedish footballer who played as a forward, best known for representing Hammarby IF.

== Club career ==
Johansson was born in Härnösand and started to play football with local club IF Älgarna, making his debut for the senior team at age 14 in the Swedish lower divisions. As a youngster, he reportedly attracted interest from Degerfors IF.

Before the 1956–57 season, Johansson instead transferred to Hammarby IF in Allsvenskan, the domestic top tier. Aged 18, he immediately established himself as a starting player, but Hammarby got relegated at the end of the year.

In 1957–58, Hammarby scored an impressive 117 goals in 33 fixtures throughout the campaign, with Johansson playing an integral part, getting instantly promoted from the second division.

Johansson was a regular starting player for Hammarby from 1959 to 1963 in Sweden's top football league, the Allsvenskan. He got known as a prolific goalscorer with a powerful shot, forming a fruitful partnership with forward Karl-Evert Skoglund.

Being plagued by injuries his whole career, Johansson only played one game Hammarby in 1964, now competing in the second tier again, and left the club at the end of the year. In total, Johansson made 116 league appearances for Hammarby, scoring 65 goals.

Johansson ended his career with IFK Västerås, playing two seasons before announcing his retirement in 1966, aged 28.

== International career ==
After regularly featuring for the Swedish U21's and B-team, Johansson won his first and only senior cap for Sweden on 18 September 1960. He played the full game in a 1–3 loss against Norway, in an away friendly.
