= Kjell Granqvist =

Swedish footballer

Senior career*
Years	Team	Apps	(Gls)
1984–1985	Hammarby IF	40	(1)
- Djurgårdens IF
- * Club domestic league appearances and goals

Kjell Granqvist is a Swedish retired footballer. Granqvist made 15 Allsvenskan appearances for Djurgården and scored 0 goals.
