= Joacim Sjöström =

Swedish footballer

Personal information
- Full name: Rolf Joacim Sjöström
- Date of birth: 31 August 1964 (age 62)
- Place of birth: Stockholm, Sweden
- Height: 1.93 m (6 ft 4 in)
- Position: Goalkeeper

Senior career*
| Years | Team | Apps | (Gls) |
| 1983–1988 | Djurgården | 129 | (0) |
| 1989–1990 | AIK | 41 | (0) |
| 1992 | Ljusdals IF | | |
- Gustavsbergs IF

International career
| | Sweden U18 | 9 | (0) |
| | Sweden U21 | 1 | (0) |
- * Club domestic league appearances and goals

Rolf Joacim Sjöström (born 31 August 1964) is a Swedish former footballer. He made 39 Allsvenskan appearances for Djurgården. He also played 41 matches for AIK in Allsvenskan.
