= Björn Alkeby =

Swedish footballer (1952–2025)

Personal information
- Full name: Lennart Björn Alkeby
- Date of birth: 17 July 1952
- Date of death: 31 October 2025 (aged 73)
- Position: Goalkeeper

Youth career
- Danderyds SK
- Djurgårdens IF

Senior career*
Years	Team	Apps	(Gls)
1971–1982	Djurgårdens IF	265	(0)
1993	Djurgårdens IF	1	(0)

International career
1972–1975	Sweden U23	9	(0)
- * Club domestic league appearances and goals

Lennart Björn Alkeby (17 July 1952 – 31 October 2025) was a Swedish football goalkeeper representing Djurgården throughout his career.

== Career ==
Lennart Björn Alkeby was born 17 July 1952 and moved with his family from Flen to Stockholm at the age of eight. He made his Djurgården debut in the 1971 Allsvenskan in a 3–1 win against Örgryte IS. Alkeby communicated his decision to retire after the 1982 season in Division 2, where Djurgården qualified for a Tvillingderbyt play-off against AIK. He ended his career after the season and became goalkeeping coach for the club. He made an appearance in the 1993 Division 1 Norra at the age of 41 for Djurgården when Djurgården's goalkeepers were injured.

== Later life and death ==
Alkeby was in the first class of students to finish the two-year fritidsledare education in 1976 at the Swedish School of Sport and Health Sciences, together with Hammarby footballer Thom Åhlund, where the two also played each other in a derby on the day of graduation. In 1989, Alkeby was elected board member of Djurgårdens IF football department. He continued to watch Djurgården matches after his career had ended.

He died on 31 October 2025, aged 73, with Djurgården communicating to honour him with a moment of silence before their home match against IFK Göteborg in the 2025 Allsvenskan.

== Honours ==
Djurgårdens IF

- Division 2 Norra: 1982
