= Roger Casslind =

Swedish footballer

Senior career*
| Years | Team | Apps | (Gls) |
- Djurgården
- * Club domestic league appearances and goals

Roger Casslind is a Swedish former footballer. He made 56 Allsvenskan appearances and two goals for Djurgården.
