= Lennart Pettersson (footballer) =

Swedish footballer

Senior career*
Years	Team	Apps	(Gls)
1951–1953	Djurgården	20	(1)
- * Club domestic league appearances and goals

Lennart Pettersson is a Swedish retired footballer. Pettersson made 20 Allsvenskan appearances for Djurgården and scored 1 goal.
