= Anders Grönhagen =

Swedish footballer and manager

Personal information
- Full name: Per Nils Anders Grönhagen
- Date of birth: 22 May 1953 (age 73)
- Place of birth: Gudmundrå, Sweden
- Position: Striker

Youth career
- Kramfors IF

Senior career*
Years	Team	Apps	(Gls)
- Kramfors IF
1971–1972	Kramfors-Alliansen		
1973–1975	GIF Sundsvall		
1976–1983	Djurgårdens IF	146	(48)
1984–1985	GIF Sundsvall	44	(33)

International career
1970–1971	Sweden U18	8	(3)
1973–1976	Sweden U23	13	(4)
1976–1979	Sweden	18	(4)

Managerial career
- 1986–1989: GIF Sundsvall
- 1991: IFK Sundsvall
- 1994–1996: Djurgårdens IF
- 2002–2003: IF Elfsborg
- 2004: IF Brommapojkarna
- 2006: Djurgårdens IF
- 2007–2009: Fredrikstad FK
- * Club domestic league appearances and goals

Per Nils Anders Grönhagen (born 22 May 1953) is a former football manager and former football player.

== Club career ==
Born in Gudmundrå, Sweden, Grönhagen made his debut for Kramfors IF in Division 3 as a 15-year-old. In 1972, he joined GIF Sundsvall to play in Division 2 Norra. With GIF Sundsvall, he qualified for the 1975 Allsvenskan and played 25 matches in his Allsvenskan debut season.

For the 1976 season, Grönhagen joined Djurgårdens IF Fotboll. Over eight seasons, he played 146 league games for Djurgården and scored 48 goals. In 1983, Grönhagen returned to GIF Sundsvall. He finished his playing career in 1985.

== International career ==
He earned 18 international caps and scored four goals for Sweden.

== Managerial career ==
Grönhagen started his management career in GIF Sundsvall from 1986 to 89, before coaching IFK Sundsvall from 1990 to 92, Djurgårdens IF from 1994 to 96, GIF Sundsvall from 1999 to 2001. In 2002, he took over IF Elfsborg. He left Elfsborg after two seasons in 2003.

In November 2003, it was announced that Grönhagen was to take over IF Brommapojkarna for the 2004 season. He left after one season. In September 2006, Grönhagen started his second tenure in Djurgårdens IF, taking over from Kjell Jonevret. He managed the team for the remaining six matches of the season

Grönhagen joined Norwegian Tippeligaen side Fredrikstad FK in 2007. He finished second in the 2008 Tippeligaen before leaving in 2009.

== Career statistics ==
Club statistics
Club	Season	League			Cup		Europe		Other		Total	
Club	Season	Division	Apps	Goals	Apps	Goals	Apps	Goals	Apps	Goals	Apps	Goals
GIF Sundsvall	1973	Division 2 Norra									0	0
GIF Sundsvall	1974	Division 2 Norra									0	0
GIF Sundsvall	1975	Allsvenskan	25	3							25	3
GIF Sundsvall	Total		25	3	0	0	0	0	0	0	25	3
Djurgården	1976	Allsvenskan	18	4			2	0			20	4
Djurgården	1977	Allsvenskan	22	7							22	7
Djurgården	1978	Allsvenskan	26	10							26	10
Djurgården	1979	Allsvenskan	26	10							26	10
Djurgården	1980	Allsvenskan	17	5							17	5
Djurgården	1981	Allsvenskan	11	2							11	2
Djurgården	1982	Division 2 Norra	17	4					2	1	19	5
Djurgården	1983	Division 2 Norra	9	6							9	6
Djurgården	Total		146	48	0	0	2	0	2	1	150	49
GIF Sundsvall	1983	Division 3 Södra Norrland	9	3							9	3
GIF Sundsvall	1984	Division 3 Södra Norrland	21	18							21	18
GIF Sundsvall	1985	Division 3 Mellersta Norrland	14	12							14	12
GIF Sundsvall	Total		44	33	0	0	0	0	0	0	44	33
Career total			215	84	0	0	2	0	2	1	219	85

== Honours ==
GIF Sundsvall

- Division 2 Norra: 1974

Djurgårdens IF

- Division 2 Norra: 1982
