= Ronald Åhman =

Swedish footballer

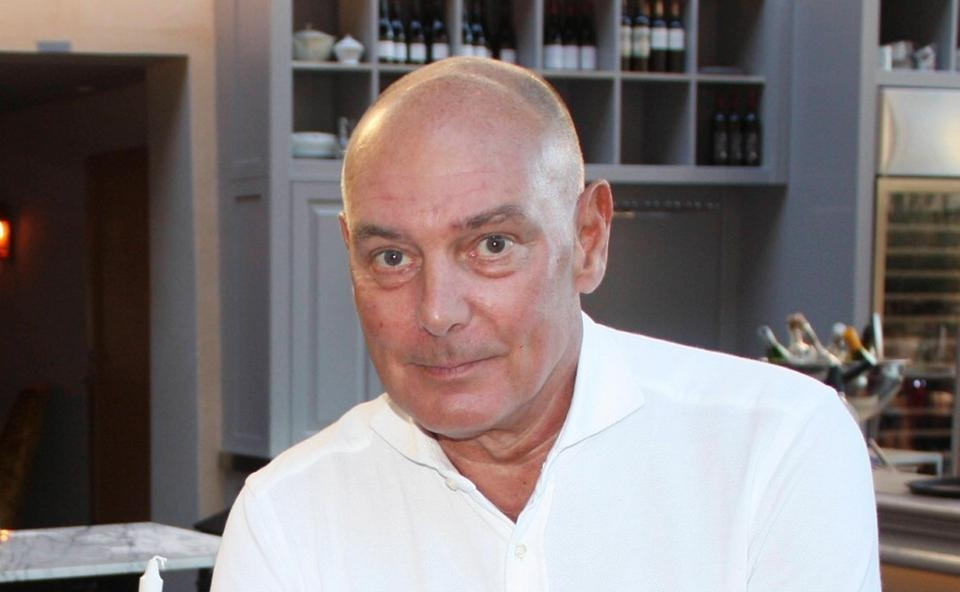

Personal information
- Date of birth: 31 January 1957 (age 69)
- Place of birth: Sweden
- Position: Midfielder

Youth career
- Sandvikens IF

Senior career*
Years	Team	Apps	(Gls)
–1975	Sandvikens IF	34	(3)
1975–1978	Örebro SK	79	(0)
1979–1984	Djurgårdens IF	107	(1)
1985–1986	Sundbybergs IK		
1987–1988	Värtans IK		

International career
	Sweden U18	9	(0)
	Sweden U23	8	(0)
1978–1979	Sweden	7	(0)
- * Club domestic league appearances and goals

Nils Ronald Åhman (or Åman, born 31 January 1957) is a Swedish former footballer who played as a midfielder.

He played his career in Örebro SK and in Djurgårdens IF as a midfielder, and he was selected to the Sweden men's national football team for the 1978 FIFA World Cup. He later joined the Djurgårdens IF board.

== Honours ==
Djurgårdens IF

- Division 2 Norra: 1982
