= 1978 Allsvenskan =

54th season of Allsvenskan

Allsvenskan
- Season: 1978
- Champions: Östers IF
- Relegated: Örebro SK; Västerås SK
- European Cup: Östers IF
- UEFA Cup: Malmö FF; Kalmar FF
- Top goalscorer: Tommy Berggren, Djurgårdens IF (19)
- Average attendance: 6,670

Statistics of Allsvenskan in season 1978.

== Overview ==
The league was contested by 14 teams, with Östers IF winning the championship.

== League table ==
Pos	Team	Pld	W	D	L	GF	GA	GD	Pts	Qualification or relegation
1	Östers IF (C)	26	15	8	3	46	20	+26	38	Qualification to European Cup first round
2	Malmö FF	26	12	8	6	29	15	+14	32	Qualification to UEFA Cup first round
3	IFK Göteborg	26	13	5	8	39	29	+10	31	Qualification to Cup Winners' Cup first round (Note: IFK Göteborg qualified for the European Cup Winners' Cup as Svenska Cupen champions 1978–79.)
4	Kalmar FF	26	11	9	6	35	30	+5	31	Qualification to UEFA Cup first round
5	Djurgårdens IF	26	10	10	6	50	32	+18	30	
6	IF Elfsborg	26	10	9	7	44	37	+7	29	
7	AIK	26	10	7	9	31	35	−4	27	
8	Halmstads BK	26	7	11	8	24	29	−5	25	
9	Hammarby IF	26	9	5	12	32	38	−6	23	
10	Landskrona BoIS	26	6	10	10	28	38	−10	22	
11	IFK Norrköping	26	7	7	12	33	39	−6	21	
12	Åtvidabergs FF	26	9	1	16	31	42	−11	19	
13	Örebro SK (R)	26	5	8	13	31	45	−14	18	Relegation to Division 2
14	Västerås SK (R)	26	6	6	14	20	44	−24	18	Relegation to Division 2

Rules for classification: 1) points; 2) goal difference; 3) number of goals scored.
(C) Champions; (R) Relegated

== Results ==
Home \ Away	AIK	DIF	HBK	HIF	IFE	IFKG	IFKN	KFF	BOIS	MFF	VSK	ÅFF	ÖSK	ÖIF
AIK		0–4	0–0	1–1	2–1	0–2	2–1	4–2	0–1	1–1	2–0	2–1	3–2	0–0
Djurgårdens IF	0–0		4–0	3–2	1–0	1–1	5–1	1–1	7–0	0–2	1–1	0–1	2–0	1–2
Halmstads BK	1–2	2–2		1–0	1–3	1–0	0–0	0–0	4–1	1–0	2–0	1–0	2–0	0–0
Hammarby IF	1–1	4–1	0–0		2–4	0–3	1–3	0–1	2–1	1–0	3–0	2–1	3–0	0–2
IF Elfsborg	3–1	3–3	1–1	2–3		4–2	2–1	1–1	1–1	0–2	1–0	3–1	2–0	2–2
IFK Göteborg	2–1	2–1	2–1	5–1	1–0		4–0	0–0	2–1	0–2	1–0	1–0	2–2	1–2
IFK Norrköping	0–1	2–1	0–0	0–2	1–1	4–1		1–2	1–1	0–0	5–0	2–3	0–0	1–0
Kalmar FF	1–0	2–2	3–2	3–2	2–1	0–1	2–1		0–1	0–0	0–1	2–1	2–1	1–2
Landskrona BoIS	1–1	1–1	5–0	0–0	1–2	4–1	0–2	1–1		1–1	2–0	1–2	1–1	0–2
Malmö FF	3–1	0–0	0–0	2–0	1–1	1–0	2–0	0–0	2–0		3–1	1–0	0–2	1–2
Västerås SK	0–2	0–0	1–0	0–0	1–1	0–2	2–1	4–4	1–1	2–1		0–4	4–2	1–0
Åtvidabergs FF	0–3	1–3	2–1	1–0	0–2	1–0	1–3	2–3	3–0	0–3	3–1		2–3	1–2
Örebro SK	2–1	2–3	1–1	0–2	5–2	1–1	2–2	0–2	1–2	1–2	1–0	0–0		1–1
Östers IF	5–0	2–3	2–2	3–0	1–1	2–2	4–1	1–0	0–0	1–0	2–0	3–0	3–1	

Legend: Blue = home team win; Yellow = draw; Red = away team win.

== Attendances ==
#	Club	Average	Highest
1	IFK Göteborg	16,456	32,713
2	Malmö FF	8,872	19,604
3	IF Elfsborg	7,972	14,653
4	Hammarby IF	7,753	15,422
5	Västerås SK FK	7,752	12,218
6	Östers IF	7,691	15,786
7	AIK	6,184	17,342
8	Halmstads BK	6,129	13,466
9	Djurgårdens IF	5,054	11,206
10	Kalmar FF	4,885	8,425
11	IFK Norrköping	4,374	7,958
12	Örebro SK	4,291	11,411
13	Landskrona BoIS	3,468	5,653
14	Åtvidabergs FF	2,623	7,018
