= Birger Jacobsson =

Swedish footballer and coach

Personal information
- Date of birth: 17 October 1949 (age 77)
- Position: Defender

Senior career*
Years	Team	Apps	(Gls)
- Älvsjö AIK
1974–1980	Djurgårdens IF	150	(2)
- Älvsjö AIK

Managerial career
- 2013: Sweden (women) (ass. coach)
- * Club domestic league appearances and goals

Birger "Bigge" Jacobsson (born 17 October 1949) is a Swedish former footballer and football coach. He made 150 Allsvenskan appearances for Djurgårdens IF and scored two goals.

In 2013, he was assistant coach to Pia Sundhage in the Sweden women's national football team.
