= Lars Sandberg =

Swedish footballer

Personal information
- Date of birth: 25 June 1957 (age 69)

Senior career*
Years	Team	Apps	(Gls)
- Djurgården
- * Club domestic league appearances and goals

Lars Sandberg (born 25 June 1957) is a Swedish former footballer. He made 49 Allsvenskan appearances for Djurgården.
