= Lars Stenbäck =

Swedish footballer

Personal information
- Date of birth: 11 January 1956 (age 70)
- Position: Midfielder

Senior career*
Years	Team	Apps	(Gls)
1975–1984	Djurgårdens IF		
1985	IFK Västerås		
1986	Hammarby IF		
1987–1990	IFK Eskilstuna		

International career
1977–1979	Sweden U21	2	(0)
- * Club domestic league appearances and goals

Lars Stenbäck (born 11 January 1956) is a Swedish former footballer who played as a midfielder. He made 118 Allsvenskan appearances for Djurgårdens IF and scored eight goals.
