= Vito Knežević =

Swedish footballer

Personal information
- Full name: Vito Knežević
- Date of birth: 25 January 1956 (age 70)
- Place of birth: SFR Yugoslavia
- Position: Defender

Senior career*
Years	Team	Apps	(Gls)
–1976	Norrby IF		
1977–1988	Djurgårdens IF	236	(17)
1978–1991	Spårvägens FF		

International career
1973–1974	Sweden U19	8	(0)
1976	Sweden U21	4	(0)
- * Club domestic league appearances and goals

Vito Knežević (born 25 January 1956) is a Swedish retired football defender who played most of his career for Allsvenskan club Djurgårdens IF.

Born in SFR Yugoslavia, Knežević came to Sweden with his family in 1960. The family settled in the city of Borås. Knežević began playing for Norrby IF and was considered to be one of Sweden's biggest talents when Djurgårdens IF paid 250,000 kronor and signed him in 1977. Knežević began his career as a sweeper, but later learned to play as both wingback and winger. He was best known for his tough style of playing. He represented the Sweden U19 and U21 teams.
