= Håkan Stenbäck =

Swedish footballer and manager

Personal information
- Full name: Jan Sven Håkan Stenbäck
- Date of birth: 28 October 1951 (age 75)
- Position: Midfielder

Senior career*
Years	Team	Apps	(Gls)
1972–1980	Djurgårdens IF	199	(46)
1981–1983	Sandvikens IF		

Managerial career
- 1989: Åtvidabergs FF
- * Club domestic league appearances and goals

Jan Sven Håkan Stenbäck (28 October 1951) is a Swedish former football player and manager. A midfielder, he made 199 Allsvenskan appearances for Djurgårdens IF and scored 46 goals. He also played for Sandvikens IF.
