= Tommy Davidsson =

Swedish footballer and manager

Personal information
- Date of birth: 9 September 1952 (age 74)
- Height: 1.82 m (5 ft 11 1/2 in)
- Position: Defender

Senior career*
Years	Team	Apps	(Gls)
- Bagarmossens IF
1970–1980	Djurgårdens IF	168	(0)
- Södertälje FF

International career
1970–1971	Sweden U18	5	(2)
1974–1975	Sweden U23	3	(0)

Managerial career
- Södertälje FF (youth coach)
- Hammarby IF (youth coach)
- 1988–1990: Tyresö FF
- 1993–1995: Hammarby IF
- * Club domestic league appearances and goals

Tommy Davidsson (born 9 September 1952) is a Swedish former footballer and manager. He made 168 Allsvenskan appearances for Djurgårdens IF. He is now working within the Djurgårdens IF youth department.
