= Svenska Fotbollpokalen =

1899–1903 Swedish football tournament

- Status: inactive
- Genre: sporting event
- Date: summertime season
- Frequency: annual
- Country: Sweden
- Inaugurated: 1899
- Most recent: 1903

Rosenska Pokalen/Svenska Fotbollpokalen was a short-lived Swedish football cup tournament played between 1899 and 1903. The tournament was known as Rosenska Pokalen between 1899 and 1902, and as Svenska Fotbollpokalen in 1903, when the cup was played twice, once in the spring and once in the autumn. The competition was merged into Svenska Mästerskapet in 1904.

== Previous winners ==
Season	Winners	Runners-up
1899	Gefle IF (1)	AIK
1900	Gefle IF (2)	AIK
1901	No winner	
1902	Gefle IF (3)	Djurgårdens IF
1903 I	Örgryte IS (1)	No runner-up
1903 II	Örgryte IS (2)	IFK Stockholm

== Cup champions ==
Titles	Club
3	Gefle IF
2	Örgryte IS
