= Lindarängen =

Sports venue in Stockholm, Sweden

Coordinates: 59°20′18.1″N 18°6′11.4″E

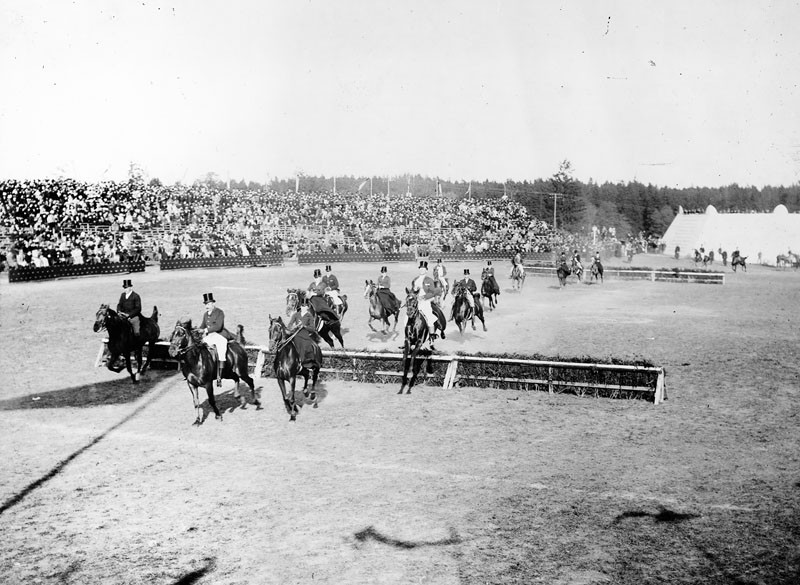
Equestrian event in 1894

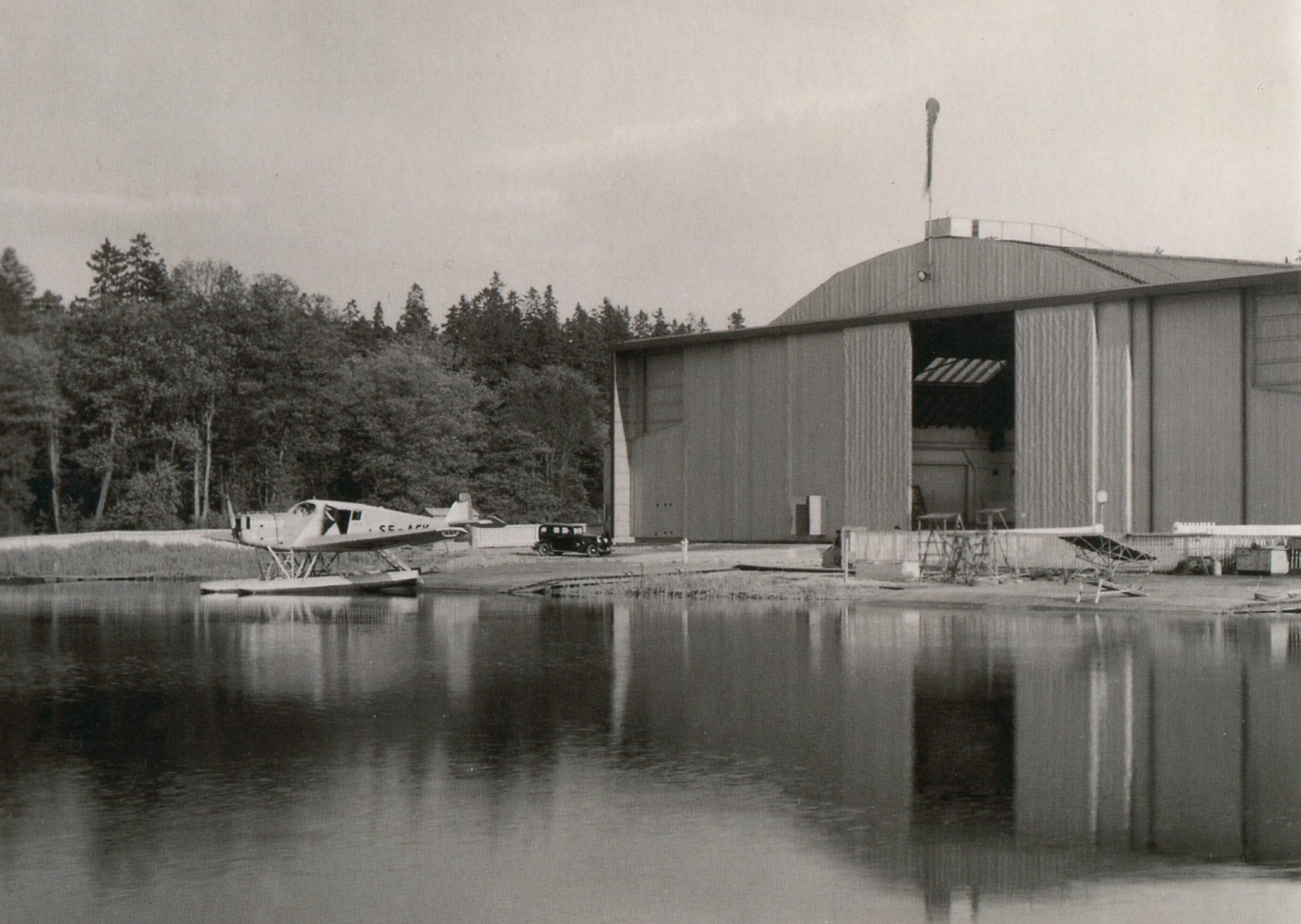
Lindarängen airport in 1930

Lindarängen is a location outside Stockholm, Sweden.

During the 1912 Summer Olympics, it hosted the steeplechase trials for the equestrian eventing competition.

Between 1921 and 1952 Lindarängen also hosted Stockholm's water airport for seaplanes.
