= Tommy Berggren =

Swedish footballer

Personal information
- Full name: Stig Arne Tommy Berggren
- Date of birth: 20 April 1950
- Place of birth: Enskede, Sweden
- Date of death: 3 December 2012 (aged 62)
- Positions: Left-back; forward

Youth career
- Solberga IF

Senior career*
Years	Team	Apps	(Gls)
1968–1982	Djurgårdens IF	289	(54)
Total		289	(54)

International career
1971–1973	Sweden U23	2	(0)
1978	Sweden	3	(1)
- * Club domestic league appearances and goals

Stig Arne Tommy "Baloo" Berggren (20 April 1950 – 3 December 2012) was a Swedish footballer. Berggren played 13 seasons (291 games), and scored 55 goals for Djurgårdens IF. In 1978, Berggren was the top scorer in Allsvenskan, with a total of 19 goals. Berggren played first as a left-back but was later converted to forward position.

== Career statistics ==
Appearances and goals by club, season and competition
Club	Season	League			Cup		Europe		Other		Total	
Club	Season	Division	Apps	Goals	Apps	Goals	Apps	Goals	Apps	Goals	Apps	Goals
Djurgården	1970	Allsvenskan	14	1							14	1
Djurgården	1971	Allsvenskan	20	0			2	0			22	0
Djurgården	1972	Allsvenskan	22	1							22	1
Djurgården	1973	Allsvenskan	25	1							25	1
Djurgården	1974	Allsvenskan	23	4			3	0			26	4
Djurgården	1975	Allsvenskan	23	0			2	0			25	0
Djurgården	1976	Allsvenskan	25	5			1	0			26	5
Djurgården	1977	Allsvenskan	24	5							24	5
Djurgården	1978	Allsvenskan	26	19							26	19
Djurgården	1979	Allsvenskan	20	6							20	6
Djurgården	1980	Allsvenskan	24	4							24	4
Djurgården	1981	Allsvenskan	22	3							22	3
Djurgården	1982	Division 2 Norra	21	5					2	1	23	6
Djurgården	Total		289	54	0	0	8	0	2	1	299	55
Career total			289	54	0	0	8	0	2	1	299	55

== Honours ==
Djurgårdens IF

- Division 2 Norra: 1982

Individual

- Allsvenskan top scorer: 1978
