= List of Landskrona BoIS players =

This is a list of football players who have played at least one first team match for Landskrona BoIS in Allsvenskan (1924–2005) or Svenska Serien (1923–24).

== Key ==
Positions key
GK	Goalkeeper
DF	Defender
MF	Midfielder
FW	Forward

Symbols key
Symbol	Meaning
‡	Landskrona BoIS player in the 2022 season
†	Player is still active 2022 in another professional club

== Players in Allsvenskan and Svenska Serien ==
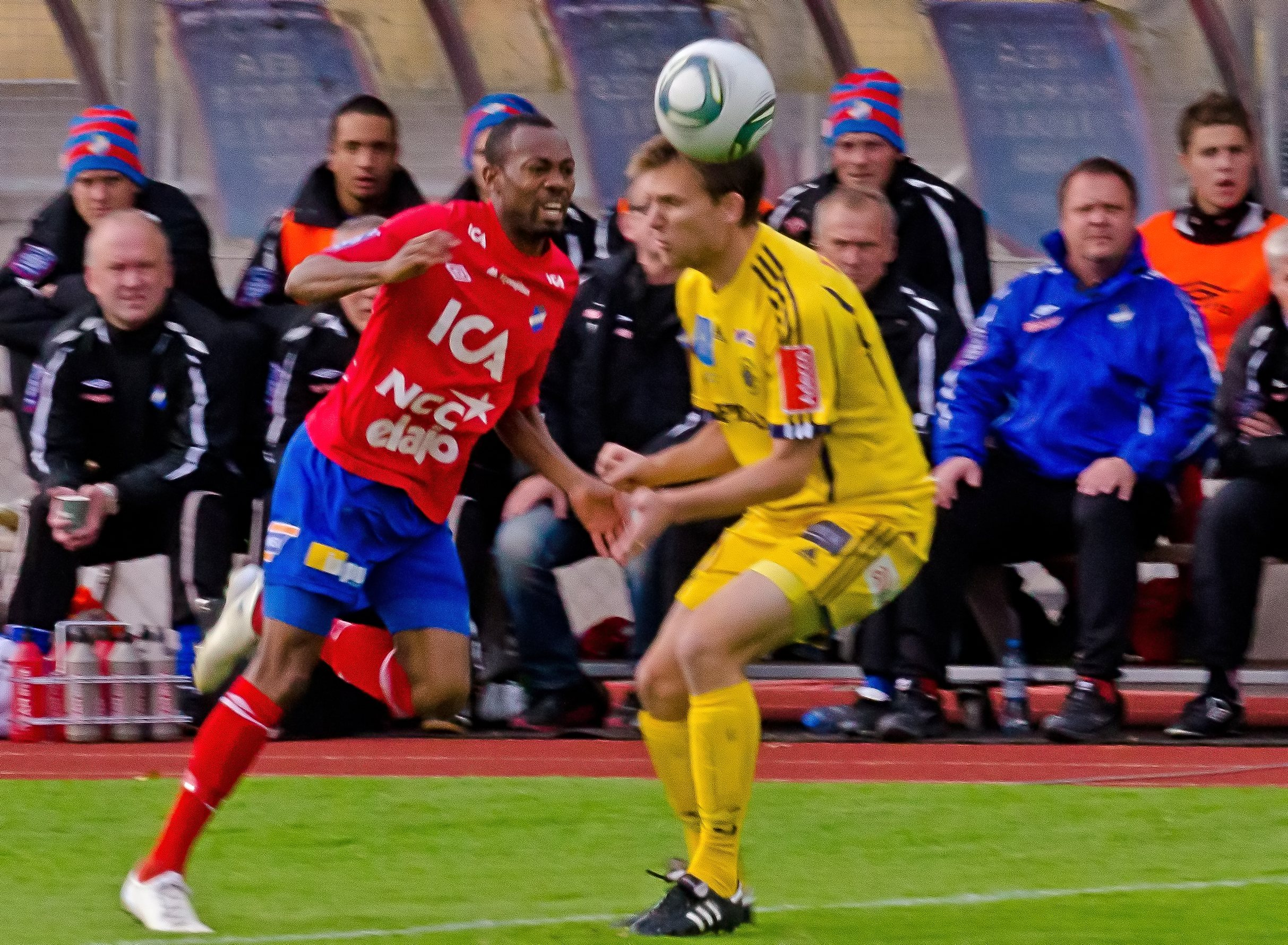
Kevin Amuneke, from Nigeria, is the best scoring foreign player for Landskrona BoIS in Allsvenskan.

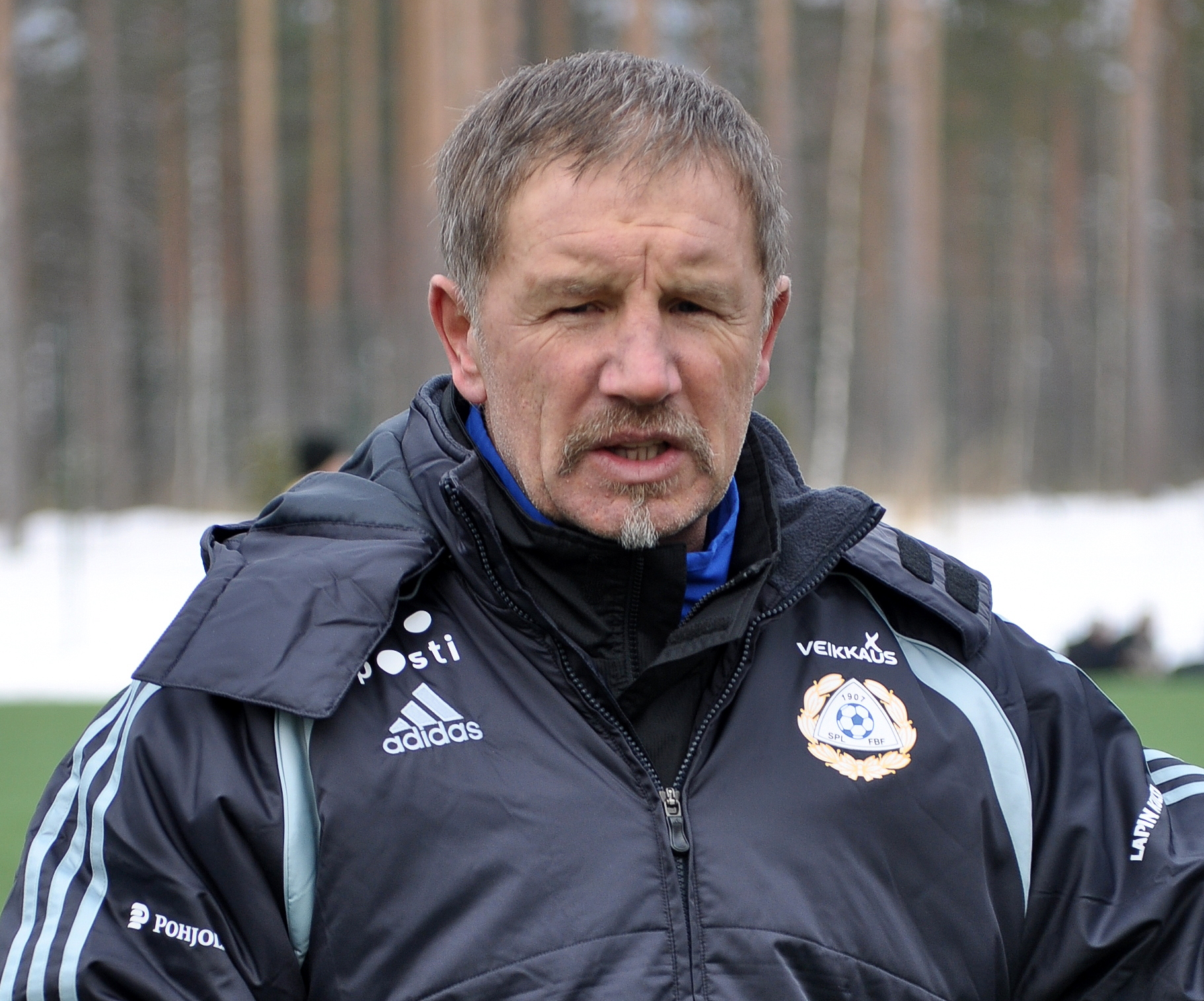
Stuart Baxter was the first foreigner who played for the club in Allsvenskan, in 1980.

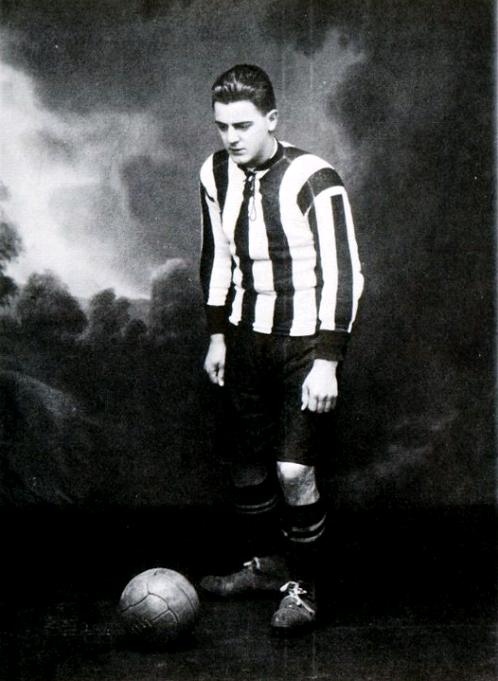
Harry "Hacke" Dahl scored 94 goals in Allsvenskan and Svenska Serien between 1923 and 1933, and a total of 334 goals for the club.

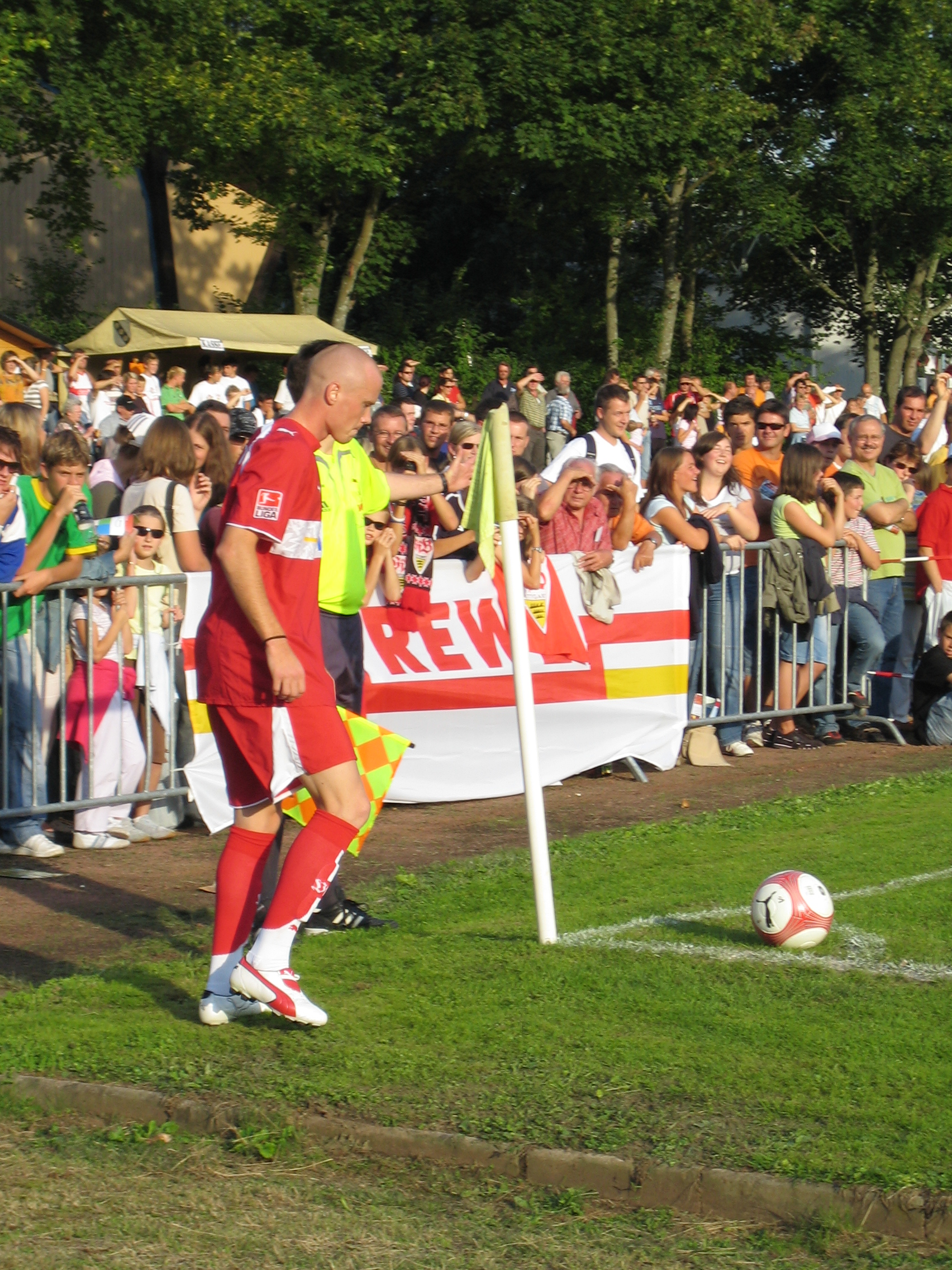
Alexander Farnerud played 51 matches and scored 13 goals in Allsvenskan 2002 and 2003.

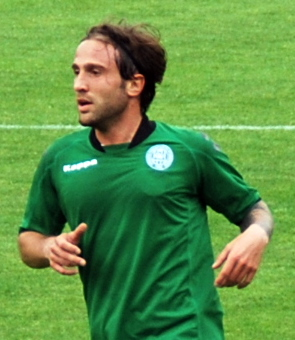
Cagliari-born midfielder Valentino Lai, played 4 matches for Landskrona in Allsvenskan 2005.

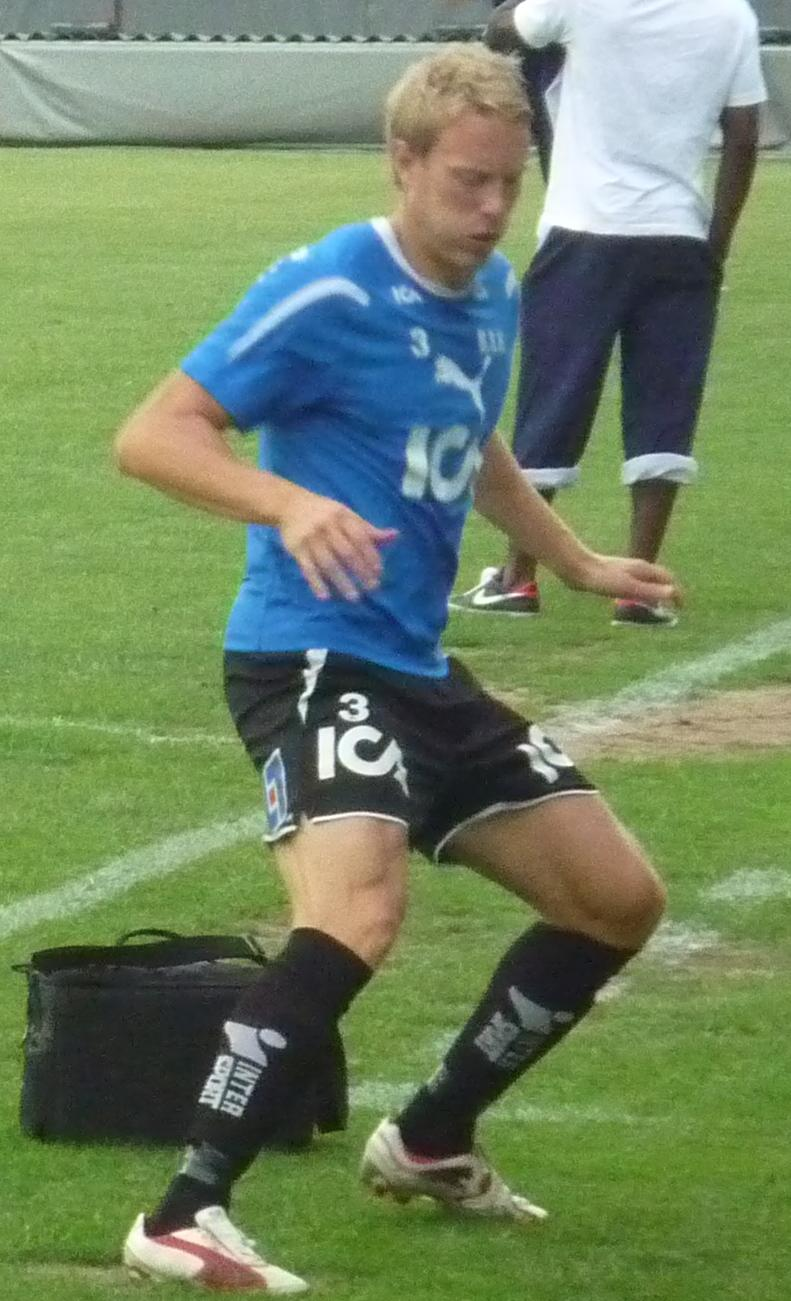
Johnny Lundberg, played 57 matches between 2002 and 2005.

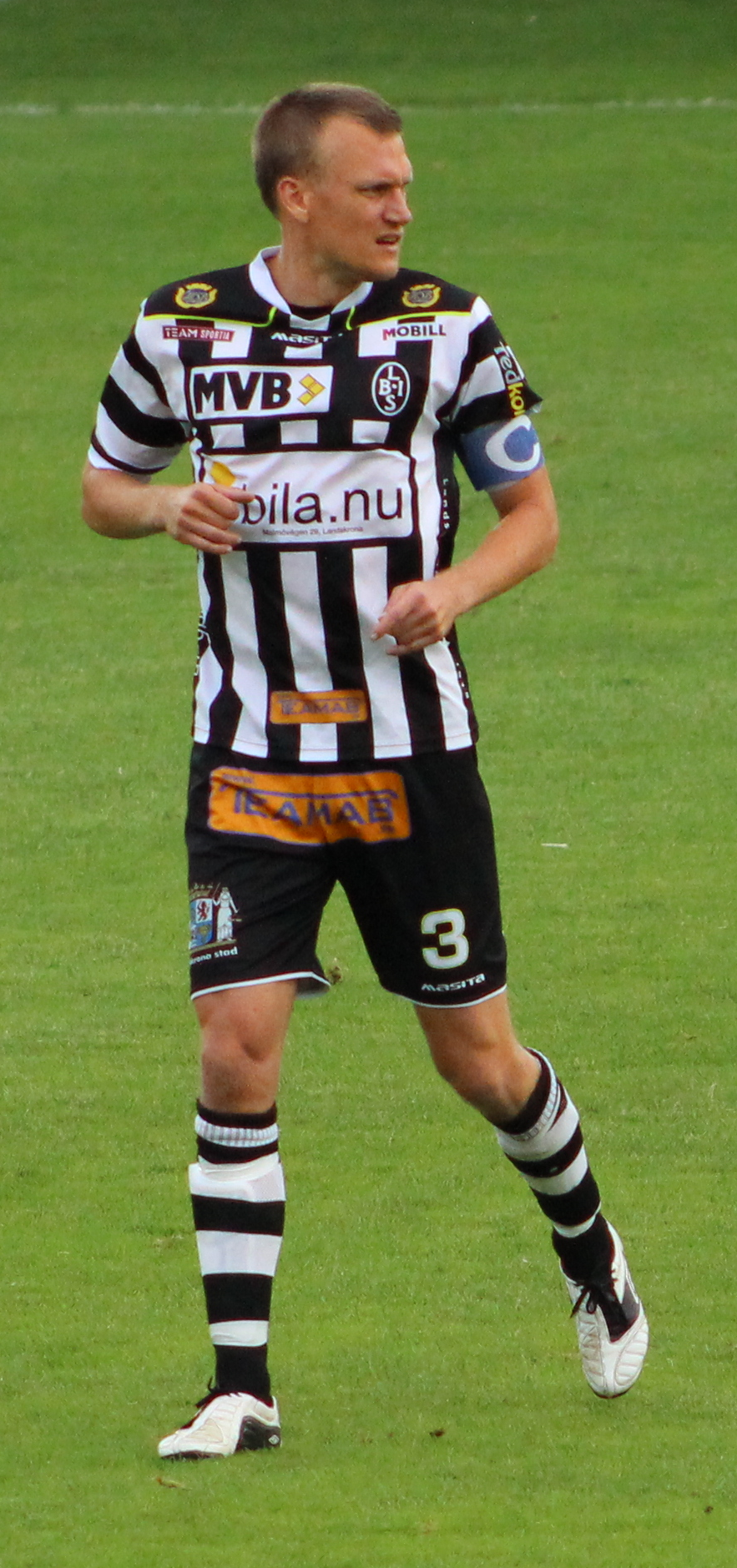
Linus Malmqvist, played 17 matches in Allsvenskan, and 168 matches in total for Landskrona between the years 2001 and 2013.

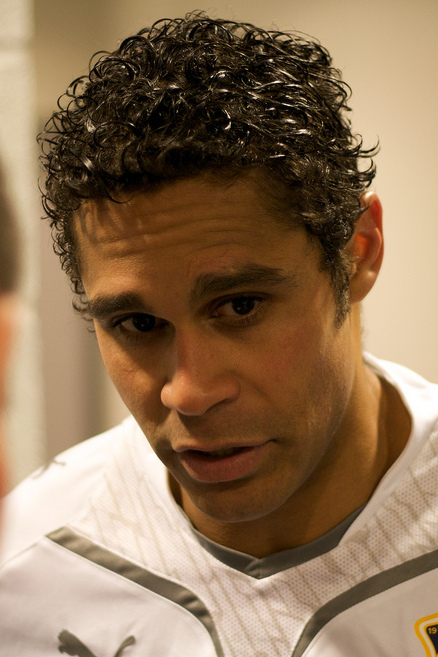
Daniel Nannskog, scored 36 goals in three seasons, including 15 goals in Allsvenskan, before leaving the club for Sichuan Guancheng.

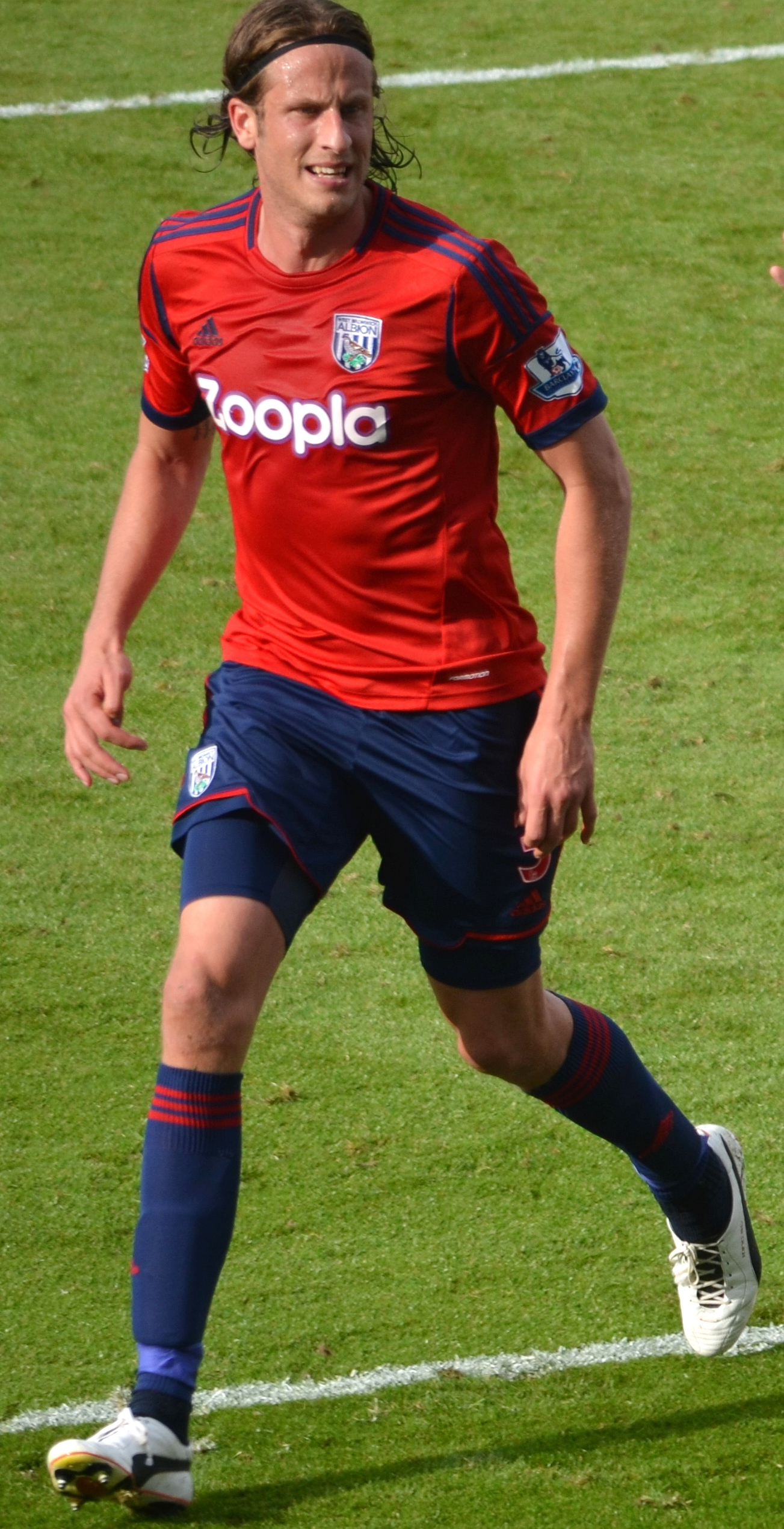
Jonas Olsson, played 56 matches for Landskrona BoIS, before leaving the club for NEC Nijmegen.

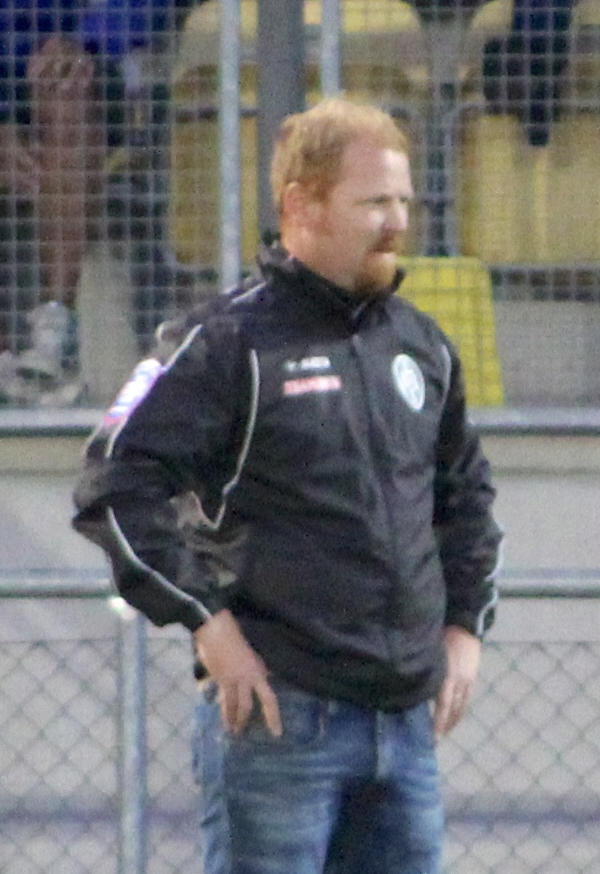
Jörgen Pettersson joined Landskrona in 2004, played for five seasons and later became manager for the club.

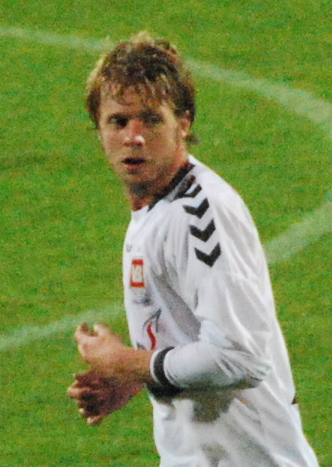
Mikael Rynell made 41 appearances for BoIS in Allsvenskan between 2003 and 2005.

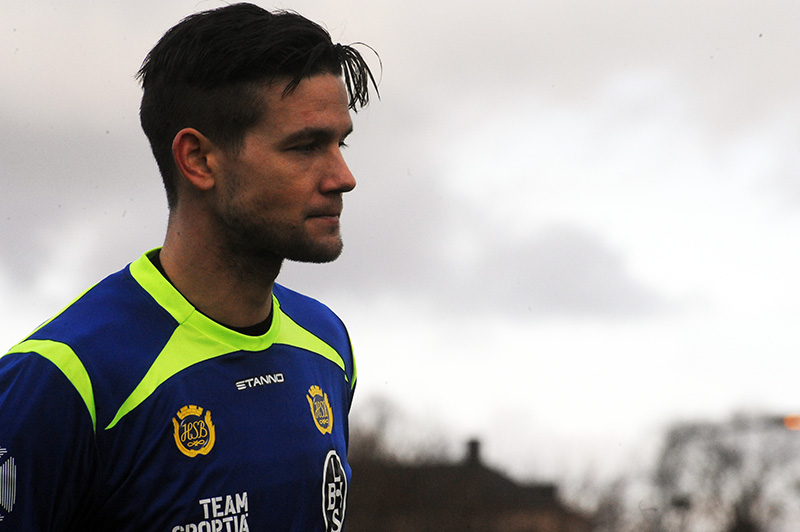
Goalkeeper Jonas Sandqvist played 57 games for Landskrona in Allsvenskan between 2003 and 2005.

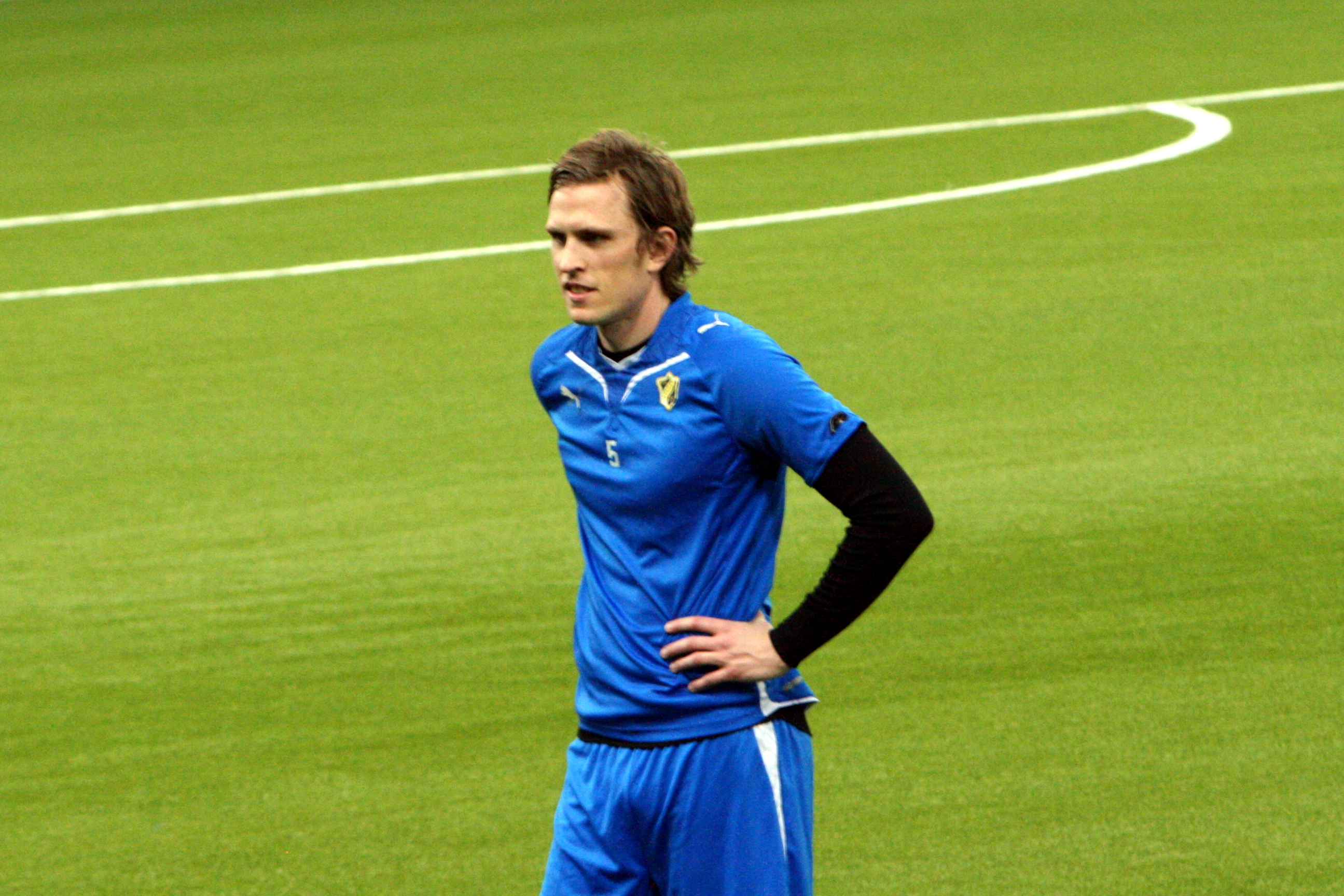
Pontus Segerström played one season for BoIS in Allsvenskan 2005.

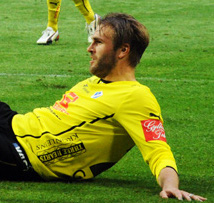
Jesper Westerberg played for Landskrona in Allsvenskan 2003 and Superettan 2009.

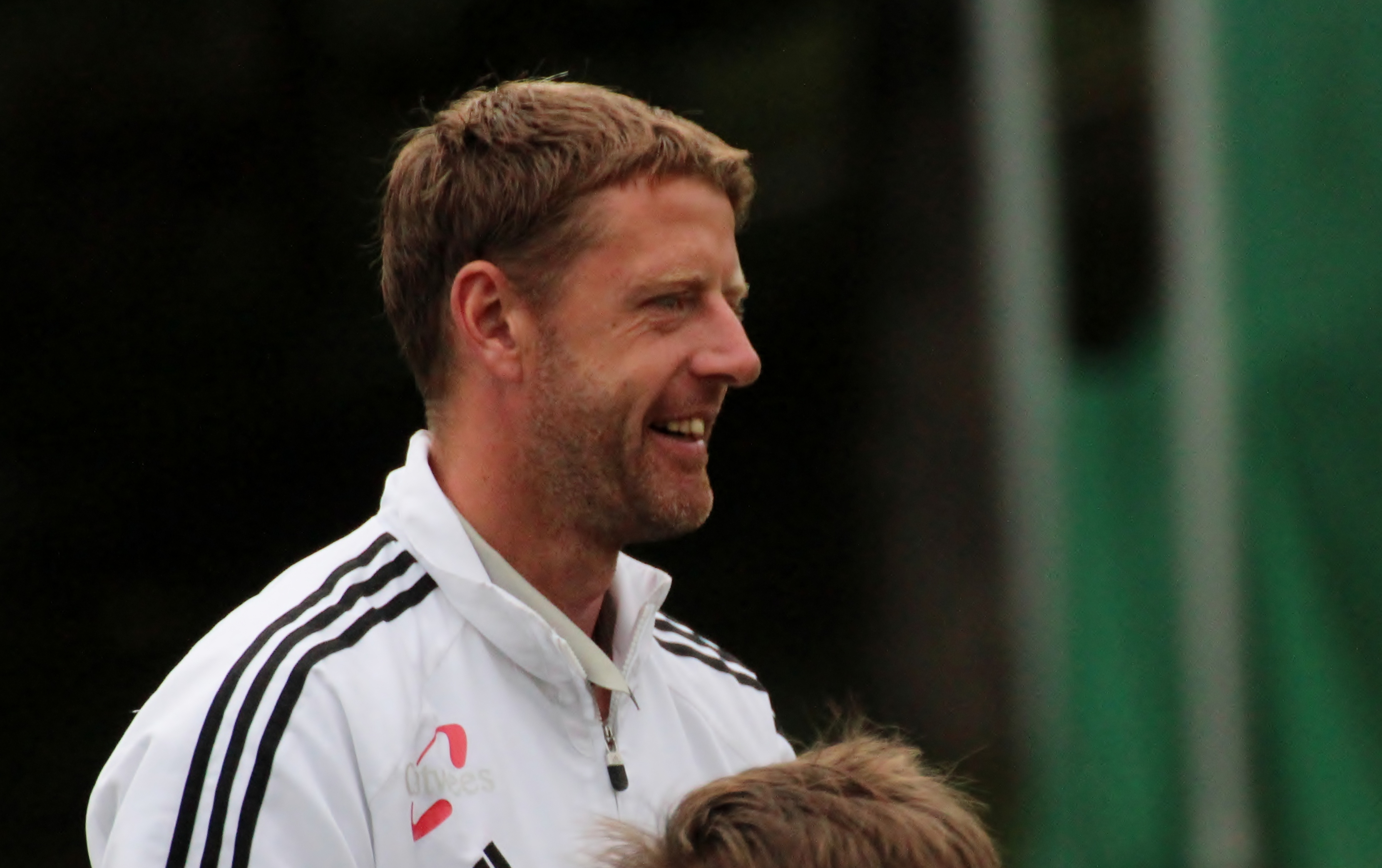
Indrek Zelinski, second best goalscorer ever for the Estonia national football team, played for Landskrona in Allsvenskan 2003.

Up to date as of 19 June 2022.

Name	Pos	Nat	Years	Caps (A)	Goals (A)
Aguiar, Fernando	MF	(Canada)	2004	1	0
Alm, Lars		(Sweden)	1975	2	0
Almkvist, Knut		(Sweden)	1948–1949	19	12
Amuneke, Kevin	FW	(Nigeria)	2004–2005	36	14
Amuneke, Kingsley	DF	(Nigeria)	2005	11	0
Anderberg, Frans		(Sweden)	1923–1924	3	0
Anderberg, Gunnar	FW	(Sweden)	1937–1945	27	7
Anderberg, John		(Sweden)	1944–1949	31	8
Andersson, Axel	GK	(Sweden)	1925–1929	73	0
Andersson, Erik		(Sweden)	1926–1927	1	0
Andersson, Erik "Fjösaren"	GK	(Sweden)	1934–1942	137	0
Andersson, Gustaf	DF	(Sweden)	2005	20	1
Andersson, Hans	GK	(Sweden)	1923–1926	35	0
Andersson, Hugo		(Sweden)	1924–1926	5	1
Andersson, Ivan		(Sweden)	1931–1933	3	1
Andersson, Johan	FW	(Sweden)	2002–2005	76	8
Andersson, Lars	MF	(Sweden)	1978	3	0
Andersson, Lennart		(Sweden)	1971	3	0
Andersson, Mats	MF	(Sweden)	1994	25	1
Andersson, Olof	MF	(Sweden)	1994	11	1
Andersson, Oscar		(Sweden)	1923–1927	59	0
Andrijevski, Greger	FW	(Sweden)	1994	18	9
Aronsson, Mats	FW	(Sweden)	1977–1980	83	36
Augustsson, Bo	MF	(Sweden)	1975–1979	102	16
Augustsson, Johan	MF	(Sweden)	1994	1	0
Augustsson, Jörgen	DF	(Sweden)	1976–1980	117	0
Avnskjold, Morten	MF	(Denmark)	2005	11	0
Axelsson, Kenneth	MF	(Sweden)	1971	4	0
Baxter, Stuart	DF	(Scotland)	1980	26	1
Behmer, Lars		(Sweden)	1924–1925	1	1
Bengtsson, Arne		(Sweden)	1939–1940	2	0
Bengtsson, Henry		(Sweden)	1926–1927	1	1
Bengtsson, Karl		(Sweden)	1934–1935	6	0
Bengtsson, Rolf	FW	(Sweden)	1971	10	0
Berg, Kenneth	MF	(Sweden)	1971–1972	32	0
Berghult, Esbjörn	FW	(Sweden)	1994	13	0
Bergman, Otto		(Sweden)	1944–1945	4	0
Bergsten, Curt	FW	(Sweden)	1931–1942	157	60
Bergsten, Gunnar		(Sweden)	1930–1941	172	0
Blomberg, Ernst		(Sweden)	1924–1925	1	0
Bola, Bobo	FW	(Rwanda)	2005	7	1
Branting, Sven		(Sweden)	1929–1933	62	24
Brzokoupil, Dan	FW	(Sweden)	1972–1974	72	13
Cetinkaya, Hasan	MF	(Sweden)	2002–2004	63	2
Corneliusson, Karl	DF	(Sweden)	2005	7	1
Cronqvist, Claes	DF	(Sweden)	1971–1980	233	23
Csirmaz, Peter		(Sweden)	1978	4	0
Cöster, Ingvar	DF	(Sweden)	1948–1949	4	0
Dahan, Rickard	DF	(Sweden)	1994	24	1
Dahl, Harry	FW	(Sweden)	1923–1933	178	94
Dahlgren, Gert	MF	(Sweden)	1979	15	0
Dahlgren, Gunnar		(Sweden)	1944–1949	17	0
Dahlgren, Kenneth	DF	(Sweden)	1971–1974	44	0
Dahlgren, Mikael	DF	(Sweden)	2003–2004	3	0
Dejenfelt, Paul		(Sweden)	1975	1	0
Dodoo, Afo	DF	(Ghana)	2002	6	0
Ek, Allan		(Sweden)	1941–1945	11	4
Ek, Johan	GK	(Sweden)	1925–1927	3	0
Ekheim, Marcus	DF	(Sweden)	1994	15	1
Eklund, Matthias	FW	(Sweden)	2002–2005	60	10
Ekström, Lennart	DF	(Sweden)	1974–1976	18	0
Ekvall, Kjell		(Sweden)	1934–1939	65	35
Elgström, Kenneth	MF	(Sweden)	1977–1979	42	1
Ericsson, Håkan	DF	(Sweden)	1976–1980	54	1
Farnerud, Alexander	MF	(Sweden)	2002–2003	51	13
Friberg, Anders	DF	(Sweden)	2002–2005	85	0
Fritz, Birger		(Sweden)	1929–1930	13	0
Fuhre, Björn		(Sweden)	1936–1937	2	1
Gabrielsson, Joachim	DF	(Sweden)	1994	5	0
Gallo, Pierre	MF	(Sweden)	2004	13	0
Green, Hans		(Sweden)	1925–1928	3	2
Gustavsson, Thomas	FW	(Sweden)	1971–1978	159	29
Hagman, Ragnar		(Sweden)	1948–1949	22	0
Halling, Erik		(Sweden)	1936–1939	34	10
Hansson*		(Sweden)	1923–1924	1	0
Hansson, Börje		(Sweden)	1944–1945	4	0
Hansson, Knut	FW	(Sweden)	1930–1942	127	65
Harrysson, Per	FW	(Sweden)	1994	18	2
Hedin, Tony		(Sweden)	1994	1	0
Hegdal, Jörgen	MF	(Sweden)	1994	21	1
Helgason, Auðun	DF	(Iceland)	2003–2004	38	2
Hermansen, Olle		(Sweden)	1936–1937	3	0
Hermansson, Henry		(Sweden)	1944–1949	8	1
Hjertsson, Kenneth	FW	(Sweden)	1975–1976	24	9
Holm, Knut		(Sweden)	1928–1933	47	0
Holm, Tage		(Sweden)	1931–1932	2	0
Holmgren, Patrik	FW	(Sweden)	2005	2	0
Holmstedt, Sölve		(Sweden)	1926–1928	6	1
Huldt, Carl	DF	(Sweden)	1923–1936	241	0
Hult, Leif	GK	(Sweden)	1972–1979	5	0
Hägg, Gunnar	DF	(Sweden)	1937–1945	74	1
Isberg, Henry		(Sweden)	1948–1949	1	1
Jacobsson, Christer	DF	(Sweden)	1977–1980	23	0
Jakobsson, Andreas	DF	(Sweden)	1994	17	0
Johansson, Axel		(Sweden)	1929–1935	101	27
Johansson, Erik	DF	(Sweden)	1936–1945	87	0
Johansson, Robert		(Sweden)	1944–1949	16	0
Johansson, Sonny	FW	(Sweden)	1971–1980	243	110
Johansson, Sture		(Sweden)	1927–1928	7	1
Johnsson, Bo		(Sweden)	1974–1975	42	3
Johnsson, Tore		(Sweden)	1936–1942	50	13
Jönsson, Bengt		(Sweden)	1944–1949	6	0
Jönsson, Emil		(Sweden)	1931–1932	2	1
Jönsson, Erik		(Sweden)	1926–1929	54	10
Jönsson, Erik		(Sweden)	1939–1942	21	3
Jönsson, Harry		(Sweden)	1941–1949	7	0
Jönsson, Helge		(Sweden)	1929–1933	79	1
Jönsson, Jon	MF	(Sweden)	2005	21	3
Jönsson, Sture		(Sweden)	1948–1949	22	2
Karlsson, Arthur	MF	(Sweden)	1934–1945	186	9
Karlsson, Kurt		(Sweden)	1948–1949	3	0
Karlsson, Roger	DF	(Sweden)	1971–1975	195	0
Kelly, Andrew	DF	(England)	2005	1	0
Kilcewskis, Kurt		(Sweden)	1975–1976	2	0
Kjellsson, Magnus	MF	(Sweden)	2002–2003	19	0
Kongsbøg, Johnny	MF	(Denmark)	1994	21	2
Kristersson, Valter		(Sweden)	1924–1929	11	0
Kusi-Asare, Jones	FW	(Sweden)	2003–2004	33	7
Kvist, Svante	MF	(Sweden)	1925–1933	131	9
Lai, Valentino	MF	(Sweden)	2005	4	0
Larsson, Tommy	MF	(Sweden)	1979–1980	43	1
Lind, Harry		(Sweden)	1944–1945	12	4
Lindbæk, André Schei	FW	(Norway)	2004–2005	12	1
Lindberg, Herbert		(Sweden)	1924–1928	7	0
Lindberg, Sigfrid	GK	(Sweden)	1931–1933	27	0
Lindberg, Sture		(Sweden)	1923–1924	6	0
Lindblad, Mats	MF	(Sweden)	1994	7	0
Linder, Erik	DF	(Sweden)	1923–1935	196	4
Linder, Henning		(Sweden)	1927–1933	117	2
Lindfors, Fritz	MF	(Sweden)	1923–1929	80	1
Lindgren, Christer	MF	(Sweden)	1971–1973	41	3
Lindgren, Ludvig		(Sweden)	1925–1926	1	0
Lindh, Jonas	MF	(Sweden)	2004–2005	11	1
Lindqvist, Magnus	DF	(Sweden)	1994	21	1
Lindstedt, Olle		(Sweden)	1936–1938	6	0
Lindstrand, Kjell	DF	(Sweden)	1971	9	0
Lindström, Torbjörn	MF	(Sweden)	1971–1977	111	13
Ljung, Jesper	MF	(Sweden)	2002–2003	34	1
Ljung, Per-Ola	DF	(Sweden)	2002	15	0
Ljungberg, Anders	MF	(Sweden)	1980	15	1
Ljunggren, Ernst	FW	(Sweden)	1939–1945	24	6
Lundberg, Christer		(Sweden)	1977	6	0
Lundberg, Gustaf	FW	(Sweden)	1934–1942	92	32
Lundberg, Johnny	DF	(Sweden)	2002–2005	57	1
Lundkvist, Folke	GK	(Sweden)	1944–1949	40	0
Magnusson, Roger	FW	(Sweden)	1979–1980	12	3
Magro, Feliciano	MF	(Switzerland)	2004	7	1
Malmberg, Claes	MF	(Sweden)	1980	17	0
Malmborg, Sven	DF	(Sweden)	1971	5	0
Malmqvist, Linus	DF	(Sweden)	2002–2004	17	0
Martins, Gustavo Saibt	FW	(Brazil)	2002	1	0
Mauermann, Günter	FW	(Sweden)	1978–1979	12	0
Milovanovic, Danijel	FW	(Sweden)	2002	12	6
Munck af Rosenschöld, Claes	GK	(Sweden)	1940–1941	3	0
Mårtensson, Dan	DF	(Sweden)	1971–1978	99	1
Mårtensson, Gunnar		(Sweden)	1923–1930	69	32
Mårtensson, Stefan	MF	(Sweden)	1979–1980	13	0
Nannskog, Daniel	FW	(Sweden)	2002–2003	41	15
Nilsson, Arne	DF	(Sweden)	1940–1949	68	4
Nilsson, Björn	MF	(Sweden)	1994	12	0
Nilsson, Bo	MF	(Sweden)	1972–1973	23	1
Nilsson, Carl		(Sweden)	1937–1942	34	0
Nilsson, Frans		(Sweden)	1923–1925	5	0
Nilsson, Gunvald		(Sweden)	1925–1928	27	0
Nilsson, Gösta		(Sweden)	1928–1929	1	0
Nilsson, Harry	DF	(Sweden)	1934–1942	145	0
Nilsson, Helge		(Sweden)	1931–1932	1	0
Nilsson, Henrik	DF	(Sweden)	2002–2004	67	6
Nilsson, Hugo		(Sweden)	1923–1926	26	4
Nilsson, Jan		(Sweden)	1971	3	0
Nilsson, Joakim	MF	(Sweden)	1994	5	0
Nilsson, John		(Sweden)	1927–1942	287	66
Nilsson, Kjell (Orup)	FW	(Sweden)	1939–1949	59	11
Nilsson, Lars-Ove	MF	(Sweden)	1971–1973	48	2
Nilsson, Leif	GK	(Sweden)	1994	2	0
Nilsson, Magnus		(Sweden)	1994	4	0
Nilsson, Martin		(Sweden)	1932–1933	19	1
Nilsson, Reinhold		(Sweden)	1925–1926	1	0
Nilsson, Rolf	GK	(Sweden)	1979	1	0
Nilsson, Ronny	FW	(Sweden)	1979	18	4
Nilsson, Stefan	DF	(Sweden)	1971–1980	198	10
Nilsson, Stig		(Sweden)	1940–1942	7	0
Nilsson, Åke		(Sweden)	1944–1945	1	0
Nordin, Ernst		(Sweden)	1939–1949	32	0
Norell, Johan	DF	(Sweden)	2005	19	0
Okkonen, Antti	MF	(Finland)	2004–2005	48	1
Olsson, Christer	GK	(Sweden)	1971–1975	66	0
Olsson, Hans-Åke		(Sweden)	1948–1949	1	0
Olsson, John		(Sweden)	1924–1929	19	0
Olsson, Jonas	DF	(Sweden)	2003–2005	56	1
Olsson, Lennart	DF	(Sweden)	1973–1976	21	0
Olsson, Per		(Sweden)	1977	4	0
Olsson, Sture		(Sweden)	1939–1940	15	0
Oltner, Peter		(Sweden)	1994	1	0
Paulsson, Thomas	MF	(Sweden)	1973–1976	87	14
Pavlović, Dejan	FW	(Sweden)	2004	2	0
Persson, Anders	MF	(Sweden)	1994	2	0
Persson, Arne		(Sweden)	1977	3	0
Persson, Bertil		(Sweden)	1948–1949	7	0
Persson, Erik	DF	(Sweden)	1934–1945	182	32
Persson, Gunnar		(Sweden)	1938–1941	8	3
Persson, Henning		(Sweden)	1923–1927	60	0
Persson, Henning		(Sweden)	1926–1927	4	3
Persson, Jan		(Sweden)	1941–1942	1	0
Persson, Jesper	DF	(Sweden)	1994	15	0
Persson, Kurt		(Sweden)	1948–1949	1	0
Peterson, Göran	MF	(Sweden)	1973–1980	186	10
Petersson, Jörn		(Sweden)	1971	6	1
Pettersson, Axel		(Sweden)	1928–1935	19	4
Pettersson, Carl		(Sweden)	1925–1926	1	0
Pettersson, Georg		(Sweden)	1923–1933	85	14
Pettersson, Henning		(Sweden)	1926–1939	137	2
Pettersson, Jörgen	FW	(Sweden)	2004–2005	41	8
Pettersson, Nils		(Sweden)	1926–1927	1	1
Rasmusson, Jan		(Sweden)	1979	7	0
Rasmusson, Roland	DF	(Sweden)	1975–1976	44	0
Ravn Jensen, Allan	MF	(Denmark)	2003	18	0
Rietz, Marcus	DF	(Sweden)	1994	4	0
Rosengren, Jerry	DF	(Sweden)	1971–1973	52	1
Rynell, Mikael	MF	(Sweden)	2003–2005	41	0
Sandberg, Carl		(Sweden)	1925–1926	2	0
Sandberg, Carl		(Sweden)	1932–1933	1	0
Sandberg, Ernst		(Sweden)	1923–1925	2	0
Sander, Mikael		(Sweden)	1974–1975	6	0
Sandqvist, Jonas	GK	(Sweden)	2003–2005	57	0
Sefort, Per	MF	(Denmark)	1994	19	1
Segerström, Pontus	DF	(Sweden)	2005	24	2
Sjöberg, Jan-Erik	DF	(Sweden)	1974–1977	104	4
Sjöholm, Tore		(Sweden)	1940–1941	1	0
Stefansson, Arni	GK	(Iceland)	1980	26	0
Stenbacka, Rickard		(Sweden)	1994	1	0
Ström, Tore	GK	(Sweden)	1934–1939	29	0
Sturesson, Stig	FW	(Sweden)	1944–1945	1	0
Svensson, Gert-Inge	DF	(Sweden)	1971–1975	104	0
Svensson, Mats	GK	(Sweden)	1994–2005	74	0
Svensson, Nils		(Sweden)	1923–1932	145	84
Svensson, Ragnar		(Sweden)	1923–1927	50	10
Söderstjerna, Christer	DF	(Sweden)	1973	3	0
Söderstjerna, Håkan	MF	(Sweden)	1994–2005	39	5
Sörensson, Måns	FW	(Sweden)	2003–2005	12	0
Sörensson, Ronny	GK	(Sweden)	1972–1979	154	4
Tati, Donato Alcalde Tieles	DF	(Spain)	1994	7	0
Theander, Per-Åke	DF	(Sweden)	1977–1980	72	5
Theander, Rolf	MF	(Sweden)	1976–1978	7	0
Thörnqvist, Mats	DF	(Sweden)	1980	3	0
Tonheta, Bruno Azenha	FW	(Brazil)	2002	6	0
Torvaldson, Magnus	DF	(Sweden)	2002–2003	48	5
Ucar, Gabriel	DF	(Sweden)	2002–2004	58	0
Westberg, Gunnar		(Sweden)	1923–1926	30	0
Westerberg, Jesper	DF	(Sweden)	2003	1	0
Westergren, Nils		(Sweden)	1944–1949	40	14
Westerlund, Axel		(Sweden)	1935–1936	2	0
Vig, Per	DF	(Sweden)	2002	2	0
Wikman, Robin	DF	(Sweden)	2005	3	0
Yngvesson, Andreas	FW	(Sweden)	2005	11	1
Zelinski, Indrek	FW	(Estonia)	2003	13	1
Åkesson, Arvid		(Sweden)	1935–1936	3	0
Öberg, Börje		(Sweden)	1948–1949	18	0

* Unknown first name
