= Sigvard Pettersson =

Swedish footballer (1928–2002)

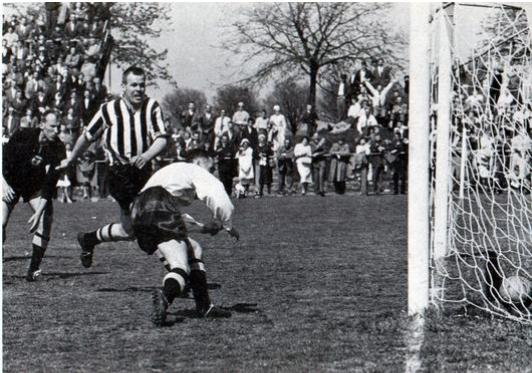
Pettersson scores one of his 298 goals in the colours of Landskrona BoIS, opponents are Motala AIF

Sigvard "Kallinge" Pettersson (1928–2002) was a Swedish footballer and a centre forward in the classical 2-3-5 formation, who during his career in Landskrona BoIS represented the club at 313 occasions and scored 298 goals – an average of 0.95 goals per game. Through the first 99 years of Landskrona BoIS' history, only Harry "Hacke" Dahl and Sonny Johansson have scored more goals for the club. Pettersson's nickname "Kallinge" came from the small Blekinge village where he grew up. During the later part of his many years in Landskrona BoIS he played together with Hasse "HP" Persson in the front. In the 1980s, Pettersson was running a smaller tobacco shop in Landskrona. He died in 2002 at age 73.
