= Göran Petersson (footballer) =

Swedish footballer

Göran Petersson (born 14 May 1956) is a Swedish former footballer and midfielder that represented Landskrona BoIS between 1973 and 1989.

== Career ==
Petersson played 581 games for the club, a figure that only has been exceeded by Sonny Johansson. He played in Swedish footballs finest assembly, Allsvenskan for 8 seasons, scored 10 Allsvenskan goals and contributed to Landskrona BoIS' Allsvenskan bronze medals in 1975 and 1976. In 1977, he was on the squad that played Ipswich Town F.C. in the first round of the UEFA Cup.
