= Saber Azizi =

Afghan footballer

Personal information
- Date of birth: 13 January 1996 (age 30)
- Place of birth: Malmö, Sweden
- Position: Defender

Team information
- Current team: Ariana FC
- Number: 8

Youth career
- IFK Malmö
- –2014: BK Olympic

Senior career*
Years	Team	Apps	(Gls)
2014–2015	BK Olympic	29	(4)
2016–2017	Landskrona BoIS	24	(0)
2018	FC Rosengård 1917	13	(0)
2018–	Ariana FC	84	(24)

International career
2016–	Afghanistan	2	(0)
- * Club domestic league appearances and goals as of 17:18, 7 April 2023 (UTC)

Saber Azizi (born 13 January 1996) is an Afghan professional footballer who plays as a defender for Ariana FC.

== Club career ==
Born in Sweden, Azizi joined BK Olympic youth academy. He made his debut against Norrby IF for Landskrona BoIS.

=== Arian FC ===
Azizi joined Ariana FC – a club from Malmö founded by Afghan immigrants – in July 2018.

== International career ==
In September 2016, he received his first call-up to the Afghanistan senior side for the friendly against Lebanon.

In October 2017, he played his first competitive game for Afghanistan, against Jordan in the qualification for the 2019 AFC Asian Cup.

== Career statistics ==
As of 14 November 2016

Season	Club	Div	League		Cup		Europe		Total	
Season	Club	Div	Apps	Goals	Apps	Goals	Apps	Goals	Apps	Goals
2016	Landskrona BoIS	Division 1 Södra	9	0	2	0	—		11	0
2017	Landskrona BoIS	Division 1 Södra	15	0	4	0	—		19	0
Career total			24	0	6	0	0	0	30	0
