= Tommy Gustafsson =

Swedish footballer

Tommy Gustafsson (born 2 July 1948), known as Tommy "Gyxa" Gustafsson, is a Swedish former footballer who played as a forward.

== Career ==
Gustafsson began his football career in the small club, Åstorps IF, which he represented from age ten in 1958 until 1969. In 1970, he transferred to Landskrona BoIS, where he contributed to the promotion of this club to the Swedish top league, Allsvenskan, already during his first season for the club. He scored the opening goal in the first qualifying match (of three), against Sandvikens IF in front of 15 685 attenders at Landskrona IP. Two seasons later "Gyxa" and his Landskrona BoIS won the Swedish Cup. He also contributed to the clubs Allsvenskan bronze medals in 1975 and 1976. In the beginning of his time in BoIS, he played forward together with Sonny Johansson and Dan Brzokoupil. During his two last seasons for Landskrona BoIS, he played as midfielder instead. He represented Landskrona BoIS at 326 occasions and scored 56 goals. After the 1978 season he stepped down and played for the small club Kågeröds BIF

== Personal life ==
He is the father of the current coach at IFK Norrköping, Jens Gustafsson.

His nickname was not related to football; as a young kid he could simply not pronounce his surname and "Gustafsson" became "Gyxa", and it is under that nickname he is remembered among the Landskrona BoIS supporters. He is still a frequent guest at Landskrona BoIS' home games. In the autumn of 2013 he was one of the most well-known people who signed a successful protest against introducing artificial turf at his former home ground as footballer.
