= Karl-Erik Hult =

Swedish football manager (1936–2010)

Personal information
- Date of birth: 18 December 1935
- Place of birth: Lund, Sweden
- Date of death: 6 May 2010 (aged 74)

Senior career*
| Years | Team | Apps | (Gls) |
- GIF Nike

Managerial career
- 1970–1971: Landskrona BoIS
- 1972–1973: Malmö FF
- –1982: IFK Trelleborg
- 1983–1985: Lunds BK
- * Club domestic league appearances and goals

Karl-Erik Hult (18 December 1935 – 6 May 2010) was a Swedish football player and manager. Both his brothers, Leif and Nils, were professional footballers as well.

== Playing career ==
Hult played for GIF Nike.

== Managerial career ==
After his player career Hult coached Landskrona BoIS between 1970 and 1971, Malmö FF between 1972 and 1973, IFK Trelleborg and Lunds BK from 1983 to 1985.

== Honours ==
=== Manager ===
Malmö FF

- Svenska Cupen: 1973
