= Leif Carlsen =

Danish footballer (1943–2018)

Personal information
- Date of birth: 4 December 1943
- Date of death: 14 September 2018 (aged 74)
- Position: Left winger

Senior career*
Years	Team	Apps	(Gls)
1962–1966	Frem		
1967–1968	Hvidovre IF		
1968–1969	FC Baden		
1970	Landskrona BoIS		
1971	IS Halmia		
- * Club domestic league appearances and goals

Leif Carlsen (4 December 1943 – 14 September 2018) was a Danish footballer who played as a left winger for Boldklubben Frem, Hvidovre IF, Swiss club FC Baden and Swedish clubs Landskrona BoIS and IS Halmia.

== Career ==
Carlsen played for the Danish football club Boldklubben Frem in the Danish Superliga from 1964 to 1966.

During the 1967 and 1968 seasons, he represented Hvidovre IF, where he scored six goals. One of them was in the Danish Cup final, where Carlsen scored the second goal in a 2–0 victory against Esbjerg fB.

In 1970 he transferred to the Swedish team Landskrona BoIS. In August 1970, Leif Carlsen famously scored the only goal in the league's division promotion qualifiers. After further success, the team was promoted to the Swedish league Allsvenskan. At the time, however, non-Swedish citizens were not allowed to play in the top Swedish league and Leif Carlsen could no longer play with Landskrona BoIS in 1971.

Carlsen was born in 1943 in Denmark, and died in 2018.
