= Mathias Andreasen =

Danish footballer (born 2003)

Personal information
- Date of birth: 8 October 2003 (age 23)
- Place of birth: Brøndby Strand, Denmark
- Position: Forward

Team information
- Current team: Landskrona BoIS
- Number: 14

Youth career
- Hvidovre

Senior career*
Years	Team	Apps	(Gls)
2022–2025	Hvidovre	39	(1)
2025–	Næstved	25	(9)
2026–	Landskrona BoIS	13	(6)
- * Club domestic league appearances and goals as of 11 November 2026

Mathias Andreasen (born 8 October 2003) is a Danish professional footballer who plays as a forward for Swedish Superettan club Landskrona BoIS.

== Career ==
Andreasen is a product of Hvidovre IF's talent department, where he made it all the way to the first team. On 10 August 2021, Andreasen made his official debut for Hvidovre in the Danish Cup in a match against Herstedøster IC.

From his debut until December 2022, Andreasen played for Hvidovre's U-19 and U-23 teams. Then, in the aforementioned month, he signed his first contract with Hvidovre and was promoted to the first team at the same time. From the start of the year until the end of the season, Andreasen appeared in 11 games, contributing to Hvidovre's promotion to the 2023-24 Danish Superliga.

On 21 July 2023, Andreasen made his debut in the top Danish league in a match against FC Midtjylland.

On 18 August 2025, Andreas left Hvidovre to join Danish 2nd Division club Næstved Boldklub.

On 3 August 2026, after a good season at Næstved, he moved abroad to play for Swedish Superettan side Landskrona BoIS.

== Personal life ==
Alongside his football career, Andreasen works at a bank.
