= Patrik Johansson (footballer) =

Swedish footballer and manager (born 1968)

Personal information
- Full name: Patrik Johansson
- Date of birth: 2 April 1968 (age 58)
- Place of birth: Landskrona, Sweden

Senior career*
Years	Team	Apps	(Gls)
- Landskrona BoIS

Managerial career
- 2001–2003: IFK Malmö
- 2004–2005: Malmö FF (assistant)
- 2006–2007: Landskrona BoIS
- 2008–2009: GAIS (assistant)
- 2010–2011: Aalborg BK (assistant)
- 2014: Landskrona BoIS
- 2014–2015: Landskrona BoIS (sporting director)
- * Club domestic league appearances and goals

Patrik Johansson (born 2 April 1968) is a Swedish former footballer and football manager.
