= Roland Rasmusson =

Swedish footballer

Personal information
- Full name: Roland Rasmusson
- Positions: Forward; defender

Senior career*
Years	Team	Apps	(Gls)
1969–1972	Malmö FF	18	(3)
1975–1976	Landskrona BoIS	44	(0)
- * Club domestic league appearances and goals

Roland Rasmusson is a Swedish former footballer who played as a forward and defender.
