= Torben Storm =

Danish football coach and former player (born 1946)

Personal information
- Date of birth: 13 September 1946 (age 80)
- Place of birth: Nykøbing Falster, Denmark
- Position: Right midfielder

Senior career*
Years	Team	Apps	(Gls)
- KB
- AB
- B 1901
- TGB

International career
1964	Denmark U19	1	(0)

Managerial career
- TGB
- 1977–1978: B 1901 (youth)
- 1979–1981: Næstved IF
- 1982–1984: B 1901
- 1985–1986: Slagelse B&I
- 1990–1993: Næstved IF
- 1993–1995: Landskrona BoIS
- 1995–1998: Fremad Amager
- 1998: RB1906
- 1999–2000: OB
- 2000–2001: Slagelse B&I
- 2001–2008: F.C. Copenhagen (ITU)
- 2006–2016: Denmark (assistant)
- * Club domestic league appearances and goals

Torben Storm (born 13 September 1946) is a Danish retired football player and coach who played as a right midfielder.

He played one game for the Denmark under-19 national team in 1964.
