= Kjell Lindstrand =

Swedish footballer

Kjell Lindstrand is a Swedish former footballer, who between 1959 and 1971 represented Landskrona BoIS at 393 occasions Twelve of these was qualifying matches for promotion to the Swedish top league Allsvenskan, a Swedish record. In 1965 he was awarded the gold medal for sport achievements by the city of Landskrona. After the club's failed attempts to reach Allsvenskan including lost qualifications in 1959, 1962 and 1968, Lindstrand finally contributed to the promotion of BoIS to Allsvenskan in 1970. He played thereafter only two more matches for Landskrona BoIS, in the 1971 Allsvenskan season. He is remembered for his faithfulness towards his club.
