= Matthias Eklund =

Swedish footballer

Personal information
- Date of birth: 23 July 1976
- Place of birth: Sweden

Matthias Eklund (born July 23, 1976) is a retired Swedish football striker.

He played most of his career in Landskrona BoIS. He played for Landskrona between 1997 and 2008 – one season in the third tier, seven seasons in the second tier and four seasons in the highest division Allsvenskan.

He also played for Helsingborgs IF and Lönsboda GoIF.
