= Håkan Söderstjerna =

Swedish footballer

Personal information
- Date of birth: 30 October 1975 (age 51)
- Place of birth: Sweden
- Height: 1.76 m (5 ft 9 in)
- Position: Midfielder

Senior career*
| Years | Team | Apps | (Gls) |
| 1994–1996 | Landskrona BoIS | | |
| 1996–1997 | Fremad Amager | | |
| 1997–1998 | Tanjong Pagar United | | |
| 1998–2000 | Fremad Amager | | |
| 2000–2002 | Landskrona BoIS | | |
| 2003–2004 | Fredrikstad | | |
| 2005–2007 | Landskrona BoIS | | |
- * Club domestic league appearances and goals

Håkan Söderstjerna (born 30 October 1975) is a Swedish former professional footballer who played as a midfielder. In media he sometimes went under the alias "The one armed bandit", as he was born with one arm only.

== Career ==
Söderstjerna, who was born without his lower right arm, played club football in Sweden, Denmark, Singapore and Norway for Landskrona BoIS (three spells), Fremad Amager (two spells), Tanjong Pagar United FC and Fredrikstad. He retired from club football in November 2007. Fans of Landskrona BoIS had previously written a song in his honour. Söderstjerna also studied economics and law at Lund University.
