= Danijel Milovanović =

Swedish footballer (born 1973)

Danijel Milovanović (born 18 October 1973) is a Swedish football player. He played for the Swedish club Falkenbergs FF a couple of years, but for the season 2000 he joined Landskrona BoIS.

== Career ==
In 2000, Milovanović scored 11 goals for Landskrona BoIS. In 2001, Milovanović followed up with 9 goals, and the same year Landskrona BoIS reached the highest Swedish football league Allsvenskan.

In 2002 Landskrona BoIS won the first match, a derby against Helsingborgs IF with 6-2, with Milovanović scoring a hat trick. In June, when Allsvenskan took a break for the World Cup, Landskrona BoIS were leading the top league, for the first time since 1980, largely thanks to the lethal strikeforce of Daniel Nannskog and Milovanović. But on 29 July in a match against Malmö FF he got a knee injury and he could not play any more that season. He never got back to full fitness and had to retire early.

He scored 6 goals in the top flight.

== Civil career ==
Following his career Milovanović became a police officer.
