= Auðun Helgason =

Icelandic footballer

Personal information
- Date of birth: 18 June 1974 (age 52)
- Place of birth: Iceland
- Height: 1.81 m (5 ft 11 in)
- Position: Center back

Senior career*
Years	Team	Apps	(Gls)
1992–1995	FH Hafnarfjördur	57	(2)
1996–1997	Leiftur	26	(0)
1997–1998	Neuchâtel Xamax	5	(1)
1998–2000	Viking FK	69	(3)
2000–2003	Lokeren	40	(0)
2003–2004	Landskrona BoIS	38	(2)
2005–2007	FH Hafnarfjördur	21	(6)
2008–2010	Fram Reykjavik	38	(2)
2010	Grindavík	21	(1)
2011	UMF Selfoss	7	(1)
2014	Sindri	7	(0)

International career
1998–2005	Iceland	35	(1)

Managerial career
- 2015–: Sindri
- * Club domestic league appearances and goals

Auðun Helgason (born 18 June 1974) is a retired Icelandic footballer

== Club career ==
Auðun started at FH Hafnarfjördur and went on to play for clubs in Switzerland, Norway, Belgium and Sweden before returning to Iceland.

== International career ==
He made his debut for Iceland in an August 1998 friendly match against Latvia in which he scored his only international goal. He went on to win 35 caps, scoring one goal. His last international match was an October 2005 World Cup qualifying match against Sweden.
