= Stefan Nilsson (footballer) =

Swedish footballer (born 1952)

Personal information
- Date of birth: December 1952 (age 73)
- Positions: Midfielder; defender

Senior career*
Years	Team	Apps	(Gls)
1971–1984	Landskrona BoIS		

International career
1974–1975	Sweden U-21	11	(0)
- * Club domestic league appearances and goals

Stefan Nilsson (born December 1952) is a Swedish former professional footballer who played as a midfielder or defender. He spent all of his professional career with Landskrona BoIS. At international level, he made 11 appearances for the Sweden U-21 national team.

== Career ==
Nilsson played for Landskrona BoIS. He represented the club from 1971 until 1984 (1971–1980 in the Allsvenskan) and played 436 games for the club. He mostly played defence, but on occasion in the midfield. He became a hero at 15 in May 1974 scoring the winning goal against local rivals Malmö FF in the 85th minute, the first time the team had ever beaten them.

After Landskrona BoIS' relegation to the second tier in 1980, Nilsson continued for another four seasons. After the 1984 relegation to the third tier, he ended his football career.

In 1985 Nilsson became Chairman of Landskrona BoIS. He let manager Claes Cronqvist finish his contract, despite the relegation. In 1986 he brought Danish manager Kurt Stendahl to the club. He left the club after the 1986 season, declaring "I have had lots of joy as active for the club, and during the two latest years I've learned much as well".
