= Sonny Johansson =

Swedish footballer and manager

Personal information
- Date of birth: 17 October 1948 (age 78)
- Place of birth: Landskrona, Sweden
- Height: 1.90 m (6 ft 3 in)
- Position: Centre forward

Senior career*
Years	Team	Apps	(Gls)
- BK Landora
1968–1984	Landskrona BoIS	390	(183)

International career
1977	Sweden	3	(1)

Managerial career
- 1997–1999: Landskrona BoIS
- BK Landora
- Helsingborg Södra BIS
- * Club domestic league appearances and goals

Sonny Johansson (born 17 October 1948) is a former Swedish football player, who between 1968 and 1984 represented Landskrona BoIS. He played in Allsvenskan during ten seasons, 1971 until 1980. Even though he never won the top scorer competition in any single year during the 1970s, he scored more goals than any other Allsvenskan player during the entire decade. Other achievements for his club included the promotion to Allsvenskan (the top tier within Swedish football) in 1970, winning the Swedish Cup final 1972 and two Allsvenskan bronze medals for the 1975 and 1976 seasons. He also played 3 caps for the Sweden national team, and scored one goal. There were voices that suggested that he would have represented Sweden at many more occasions if it was not for the Sweden national manager of the time, Georg "Åby" Ericson. The supporters of Landskrona BoIS gave him the nickname "Kung Sune, vår vän". In English "King Sune, our friend". Sonny Johansson played 638 games for the club, and scored 310 goals.

== Club career ==
=== BK Landora ===
Sonny got his football education in BK Landora, a smaller club that also has its home in Landskrona, and like Landskrona BoIS resides at Landskrona IP. Landora do though play their home games at the so-called B-planen or the secondary pitch. However, in the mid-1960s Landora had a good junior team, as they won the Scanian championships in 1966. In the final, BK Landora defeated Malmö FF, 1–0 – and the scorer was Sonny Johansson. As Landskrona BoIS had lost two forwards after the 1965 season, Claes Cronqvist to Djurgårdens IF and Hasse "HP" Persson", who stepped down at the same time, Landskrona BoIS was in need of a striker already in 1966. And the tall Sonny was a plausible choice, but he was only 16 years old and had to bide his time a little while longer.

=== Transfer to Landskrona BoIS ===
A year later, Sonny was considered a talent, and Djurgården from Stockholm made Sonny an offer, just as they had done with Claes Cronqvist two years earlier. But unlike Cronqvist, Sonny Johansson had his doubts of moving. But together with his father, Oscar, he made the journey up to the Swedish Capital. The transfer seemed likely but Sonny eventually declined the offer from Djurgården, stating "Dad would become lonesome if I move". And only a month later Sonny put his signature on a contract with Landskrona BoIS instead. And from the season of 1968 he would not only represent the club for 17 seasons, but would be regarded as Landskrona BoIS best and most popular player through history.

=== Instant success ===
Already in 1968 Sonny Johansson, centre forward of Landskrona BoIS, made a notable first season in his new club, as BoIS won its second-tier league. He played all the 1968 league games, and scored 17 goals in these 22 games. Now the club awaited a qualification to the highest Swedish league, Allsvenskan. And in front of a home crowd of more than 15,000, Sonny and his new club got a draw in the opening game, which was followed by two defeats. So also in 1969 and 1970 he still was barred from Swedish football's finest assembly. But in 1970 Sonny contributed, in the highest degree, to a new victory of the second-tier league, as well as getting a promotion to Allsvenskan. This was something that his club as well as the people of Landskrona town had longed for during two entire decades, and which included five failed qualifying attempts. In 1971 Sonny Johansson made his debut in Swedish top-tier football.

=== Centre forward ===
During the early 1970s BoIS played 4–3–3 style formation, the fashion of its time. Initially he played at one of the flanks, but soon Sonny's position became in the centre of the three forward (flanked by Dan Brzokoupil and Tommy Gustafsson). Also known as "the classical number 9 position" in the old 2–3–5 formation. However, by time, and as the shirt numbers became personal after FIFA's introduction of substitute players, Sonny was put in shirt number 10 instead. And ever since, he has locally been closely related to "number 10", also in contexts outside the club. When the club later began to play 4–4–2 formation, Sonny stayed in the front. In the 1977 season Sonny and Mats Aronsson formed a feared offensive couple. During the same year Sonny finally got a chance to prove himself in the Sweden national team, despite doing well in all three matches (among one was against Denmark in front of 45.000 in nearby Copenhagen), and scoring a goal, Sweden men's national manager of the time Georg "Åby" Ericson believed more in other forward for the 1978 World Cup in Argentina, in which Sweden only managed to score a single goal. Sonny continued to play for his club though. He also remained faithful to Landskrona BoIS after the club's relegation from Allsvenskan in autumn of 1980. Only in his very last season, 1984, manager Claes Cronqvist put him in the defence in the Swedish Cup final vs Malmö FF.

== Manager ==
Later he became the manager of his former club Landskrona BoIS. During his three seasons as manager from 1997 to 1999, he managed to get Landskrona BoIS promoted from their lowest position ever in the Swedish football league system, tier 3, up to tier 2. In 1998 they lost qualification game against Trelleborgs FF which prevented a second promotion, to Swedish top league Allsvenskan. During his third season as manager of Landskrona BoIS in 1999, the team got "semi-promoted", as the second tier Swedish league, Superettan began in 2000. Previously, the second tier was divided in two separate leagues, "Division 1 South" and "Division 1 North".

In 2007 Sonny Johansson won a newspaper competition as best-ever Landskrona BoIS player, by a large margin. And in 2010 Sonny Johansson was awarded the annual medal of honour by the Landskrona Town's Council. He received the medal from the chairman of Landskrona town's council, Lennart Söderberg, at 13 April 2010.

== Career statistics ==
Sonny Johansson's representation of and scoring for Landskrona BoIS during his 17 seasons for the club. The table below includes all matches he played for the club.

Season	Matches	Goals
1968	37	31
1969	35	19
1970	42	30
1971	37	17
1972	41	21
1973	44	24
1974	31	19
1975	35	13
1976	46	24
1977	43	17
1978	49	22
1979	41	21
1980	38	11
1981	27	12
1982	33	12
1983	37	14
1984	22	3
Total	638	310
