= Hasse Persson =

Swedish footballer (1929–2001)

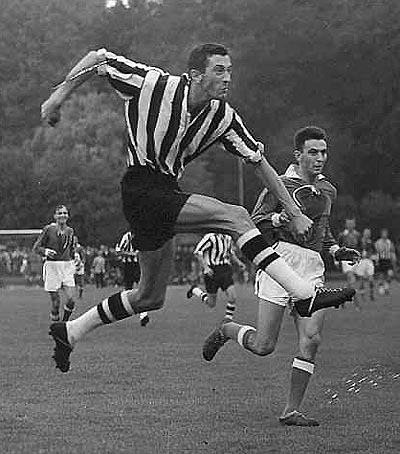
- Persson between 1955 and 1959

Personal information
- Full name: Hans Persson
- Date of birth: 20 January 1929
- Place of birth: Klippan, Sweden
- Date of death: 29 July 2001 (aged 72)
- Place of death: Klippan, Sweden
- Position: Forward

Senior career*
Years	Team	Apps	(Gls)
1949–1955	Helsingborgs IF	54	(27)
1955–1965	Landskrona BoIS	329	(258)
1966–?	Klippans BIF		

International career
1952–1953	Sweden	4	(6)
- * Club domestic league appearances and goals

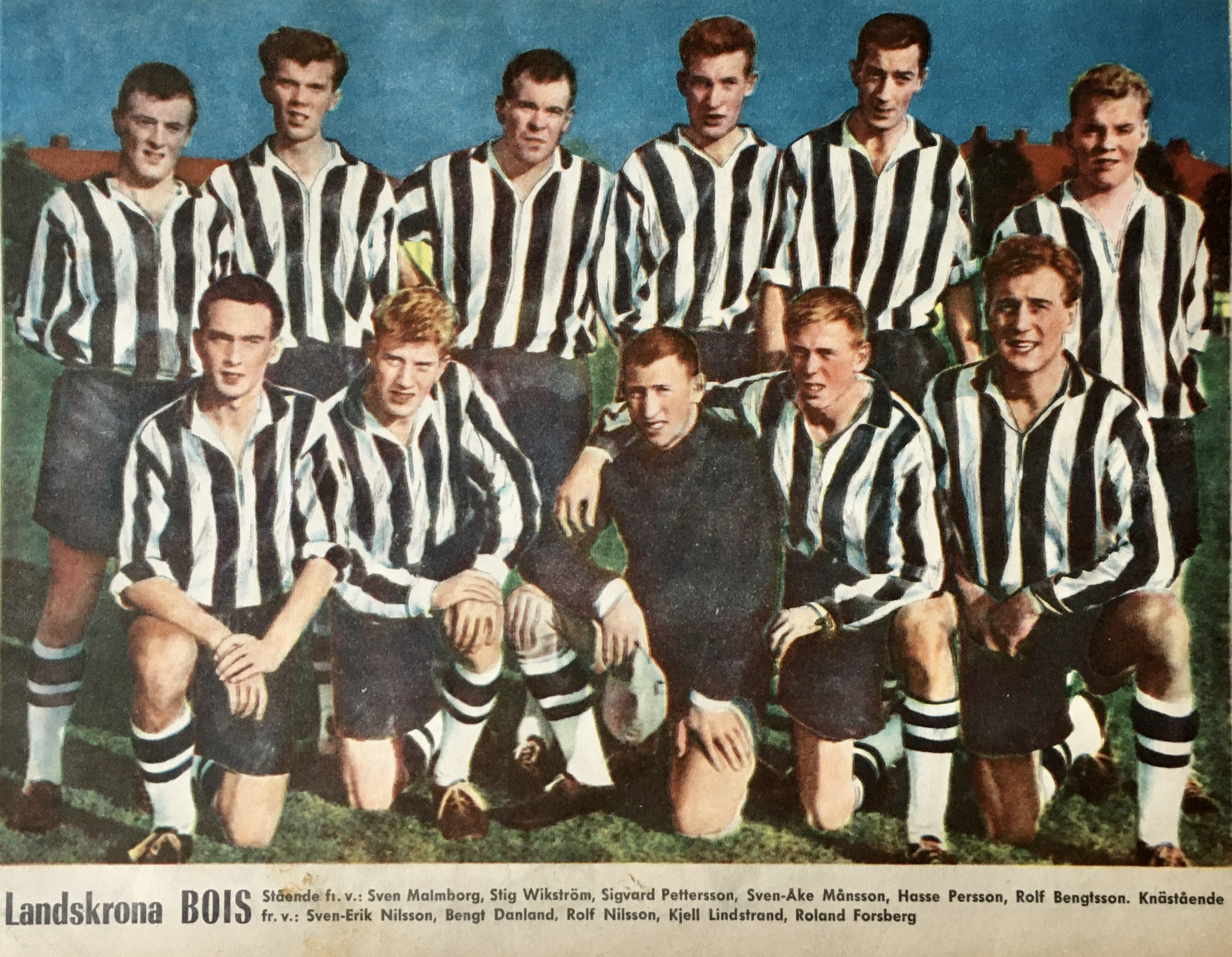
Landskrona BoIS in 1960 with Hasse Persson – back row, second from right

Hans "Hasse" Persson (20 January 1929 – 29 July 2001), often called HP, was a Swedish professional footballer who played as a forward. In his time, he was immensely popular in the football club Landskrona BoIS.

== Biography ==
Hasse "HP" Persson started his football career in his hometown Klippan before the age of 20, and in 1949 he took the step to Helsingborgs IF and Allsvenskan. There, he soon blossomed into his role as left inner and got his debut in the Sweden men's national team. His first game for Sweden was in September 1952 in Helsinki in an international match against Finland and he made a hat trick in an 8-1 triumph. The next international against Norway that same autumn he made the decisive 2-1 goal, and he also scored in his international game number three, against Italy. In this match, however, he injured his neck and had to leave the game in half time. The injury came to be fatal, and as a result of it he had to say no to test games with Italian side AC Milan.

Hasse Persson was known for his individualistic personality and unconventional lifestyle. Following a period of disputes, he left Helsingborgs IF in 1955, and signed with Helsingborgs IF arch rivals, Landskrona BoIS. In Landskrona, he quickly became a prominent figure at the club and was credited for drawing large crowds to Landskrona IP.Among supporters from the 1950's and 1960's, Persson is remembered for his technical ability, long range finishing and play making ability. He is regarded by many local commentators as one of the clubs finest ever players.

Even during the years in Landskrona professional clubs were interested in contracting him, for example Italian side Udinese Calcio. During Hasse Persson time in BoIS the club played qualification games to Allsvenskan no less than three times: in 1958, 1959 and 1962. Landskrona BoIS failed, however, to take the step up in all occasions. In the qualifying game in 1959 against Degerfors IF a new attendance record for Landskrona IP with 18 535 spectators was created, a record that still stands today. Hasse Persson winded down in his home club Klippan in 1966. He continued to be a welcome guest at Landskrona IP even after his career ended. He died in 2001.
