= Landskrona BoIS =

Swedish football club

- Full name: Landskrona Boll och Idrottsällskap
- Nicknames: Di Randige (The Striped Ones in Scanian dialect); Skånes Uruguayare (Scania's Uruguayans)
- Short name: BoIS
- Founded: 7 February 1915; 111 years ago
- Ground: Landskrona IP, Landskrona
- Capacity: 10,500
- Chairman: Anders Ekbladh
- Manager: Robin Asterhed
- League: Superettan
- 2025: 9th
- Website: landskronabois.se
Home colours	Away colours

Landskrona Boll och Idrottsällskap (English: Landskrona Ball and Sports Society, locally referred to as BoIS) is a Swedish professional football club located in Landskrona, Scania, which currently plays in Superettan, the second league tier of football in Sweden. The club was formed on 7 February 1915 through the merger of two Landskrona clubs, IFK Landskrona and Landskrona BK (earlier known as Diana BK).

Landskrona BoIS was one of the twelve teams participating in the inaugural Allsvenskan season in 1924–25. Since then, they have participated in 34 seasons in Allsvenskan and 54 seasons in the second highest division. Landskrona BoIS has won four medals in Allsvenskan, little silver in 1937–38 and bronze in 1938–39, 1975 and 1976, as well as one national cup title, in 1971–72.

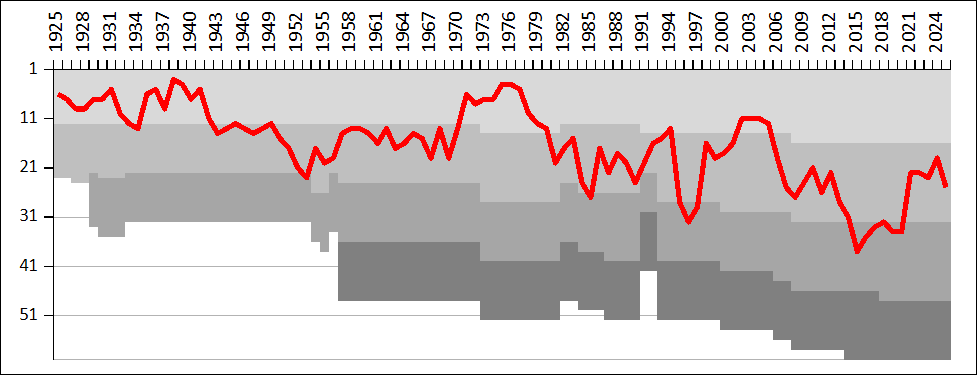
Season by season chart. Landskrona BoIS positions within the Swedish league system

The club also played ice hockey during the late 1950s and early 1960s.

== History ==
=== Roots of football in Landskrona ===
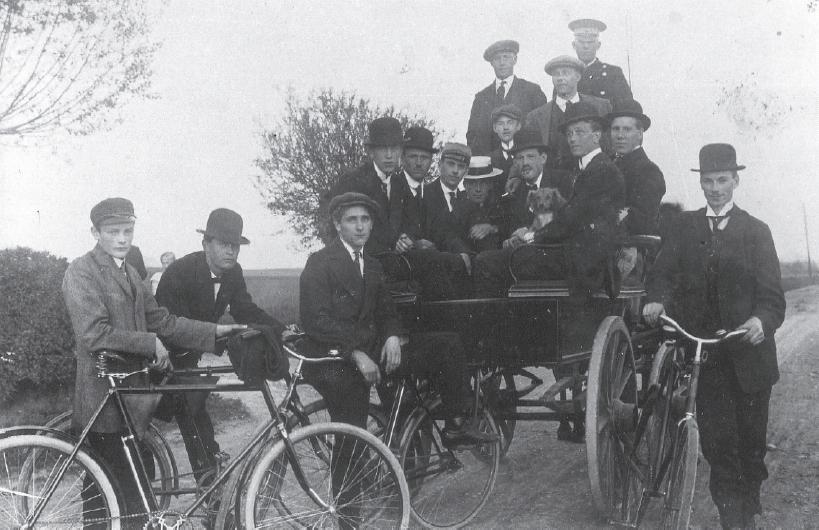
IFK Landskrona, one of the teams that would merge to form BoIS, on the road to an away match during the earlier part of the 1910s.

One of the first sports clubs in Landskrona was GF Idrott and the oldest one as of today, which was founded in 1882. Another early sports club was the cycling club Landskrona Velocipedklubb. In 1893 they built a simple kind of cycle track which included a grass field in the middle, which eventually would become the first home ground of Landskrona BoIS. A year later football was introduced to a wider audience in Landskrona, at an event hosted by GF Idrott, at the pitch which the grass at Banan formed. This was an exhibition game between players of the football section of Malmö Velocipedklubb and it was attended by 700 spectators.

As a ban on totalizators was adopted in 1896, the interest of the cycling sport at tracks decreased and Landskrona Velocipedklubb whose economy already was poor, was a few years later forced to transfer their sports ground to Landskrona Town. GF Idrott formed sections of several sports: Gymnatics (1882), Athletics (1894), Football (1902), Swimming (1906). GF Idrott soon become a leading football club in Scania.

But GF Idrott would not end up becoming Landskrona's primary football club, however, which can be connected to GF Idrott's focus on other disciplines, as well as their typical middle class appeal in a town whose heavy industry was increasing.

Thus, GF Idrott's football section declined during the 1910s. In contrast, Landskrona-based competitor Diana appealed to the community's socialist and sobriety movement subcultures. Diana also had a youth association with strict rules and the club had a formal leadership structure. Not much is known about the other team, IFK Landskrona, which together with Diana would merge into Landskrona BoIS. Their main contribution to the merging seem to have been their players.

=== Foundation and pre-Allsvenskan era ===
The respective strengths led to a merger between Diana and IFK Landskrona on 7 February 1915, forming a new club, Landskrona BoIS, with IFK Landskrona's strong player roster complementing Diana's structural advantages. The former chairman of Diana, Bror Nilsson, also became the first chairman of Landskrona BoIS, a position that he held until the end of the 1940s. Until the summer of 1924, the club's home pitch was Velocipedbanan, referred to as Banan locally.

In July 1918, BoIS played their first match abroad, against Copenhagen-based KFUM.

The best player in Landskrona BoIS during the pre-Allsvenskan era was Albin Dahl, who became the club's first, and only, Olympic competitor, as he represented Sweden at the 1920 Summer Olympics in Antwerpen. Albin played for the club between 1915 and 1921 before joining Helsingborgs IF together with his younger brother Harry Dahl in 1922. The transfer was fractious, as the clubs couldn't agree on the terms. However, unlike Albin, Harry returned to BoIS after only one season. For the following Olympics, 1924 in Paris, both brothers were nominated to play for Sweden, however, Harry's supervisor at Thulinverket refused to let him go.

=== 1924–42 ===
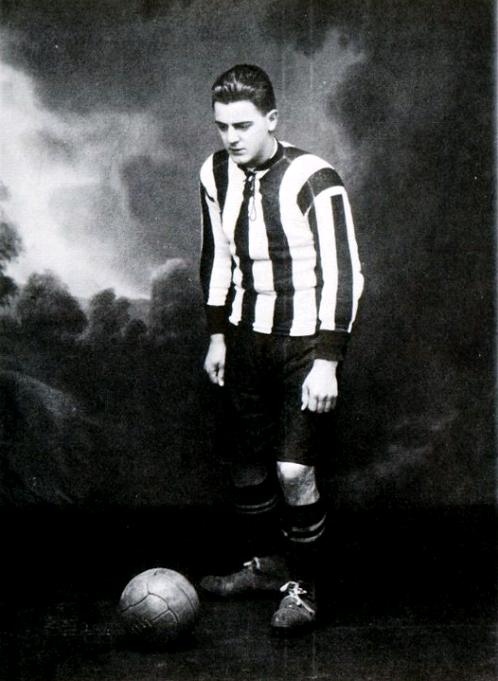
Harry Dahl is the best goalscorer ever in Landskrona BoIS, with 334 goals.

The year 1924 brought the construction of Landskrona IP, occasionally referred to as "Karlsunds IP" in reference to the beech forest located just west of the arena. The new arena enabled Landskrona BoIS to become one of twelve clubs participating in the inaugural season of Allsvenskan. The inaugural Allsvenskan matchday concluded with Landskrona BoIS as the first ever Allsvenskan table leader, following a 1–0 away victory against IFK Norrköping. (Until 1940, goal ratio was tiebreaker when separating teams with the same number of points.) The club's first Allsvenskan home game at Landskrona IP was a 4–0 defeat against IFK Göteborg. Landskrona finished their first season in Allsvenskan in 6th place.

Harry Dahl continued to play for the club until the 1931–32 season. When he left, he had scored an unmatched 334 goals in 410 matches, and he is still the club's best goalscorer of all time.

The team was relegated for the first time following the 1932–33 season, the first season following the departure of Dahl, but the club was promoted back Allsvenskan the following season. This time they had their first real manager in Nisse Svensson and he took Landskrona to the top of the league. The club won their first medal in the 1937–38 season, the Little Silver Medal as it is called in Sweden, awarded to the 3rd placed team in the league. BoIS was only a small difference in goal ratio away from the runners-up Helsingborg IF. The following 1938–39 season ended with Landskrona BoIS winning the bronze medal for their fourth-place finish. Knut Hansson (known as "Buckla") was a notable player and striker during the late 1930s, who was in the squad that finished third in the 1937–38 Allsvenskan. He later had to leave the club due to not being able to find a job in Landskrona.

BoIS participated in 17 of the initial 18 seasons of Allsvenskan, from the inaugural season in 1924–25 to the 1941–42 season.

=== 1942–54 ===
The 1940s were not as positive for the club as the 1930s. The team had no stability and was a yo-yo club for most of the 1940s. An exception to the otherwise mediocre performance came in the 1949 Svenska Cupen, the eighth edition of the tournament, in which Landskrona made their way to the final, defeating Mjölby, Helsingborgs IF, Råå IF and BK Kenty on the way. In the final, played on 24 July, they met AIK in front of 14,718 spectators at Råsunda Stadium in Solna. They lost 1–0, with the sole goal coming on a penalty for a handball.

After the 1941/42 relegation, Landskrona BoIS first became a top team in their Division 2 group, and on two occasions they won their group, thereby winning promotion back to Allsvenskan. On both occasions their stays were short, finishing last in both the 1944–45 and 1948–49 Allsvenskan seasons. The situation worsened in the 1951–52 season, with BoIS finishing ninth of ten teams in the second tier, and being relegated to the third tier. With Landskrona's other notable club, BK Landora, also relegated from Division 2, Landskrona now lacked any representation in the two top tiers of Swedish football. That situation would last only one year, however, as BoIS were promoted back to the second tier in 1953.

Notable players from this period include Sigvard Pettersson who scored 297 goals and Knut Hansson who had previously been in the squads that had gained two Allsvenskan medals.

=== Mid-1950s and 1960s ===
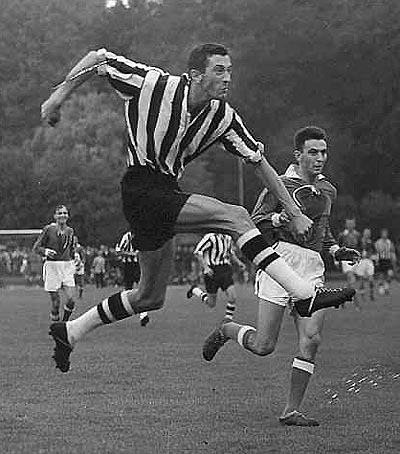
Hasse Persson scored 257 goals in 327 matches between 1955 and 1965.

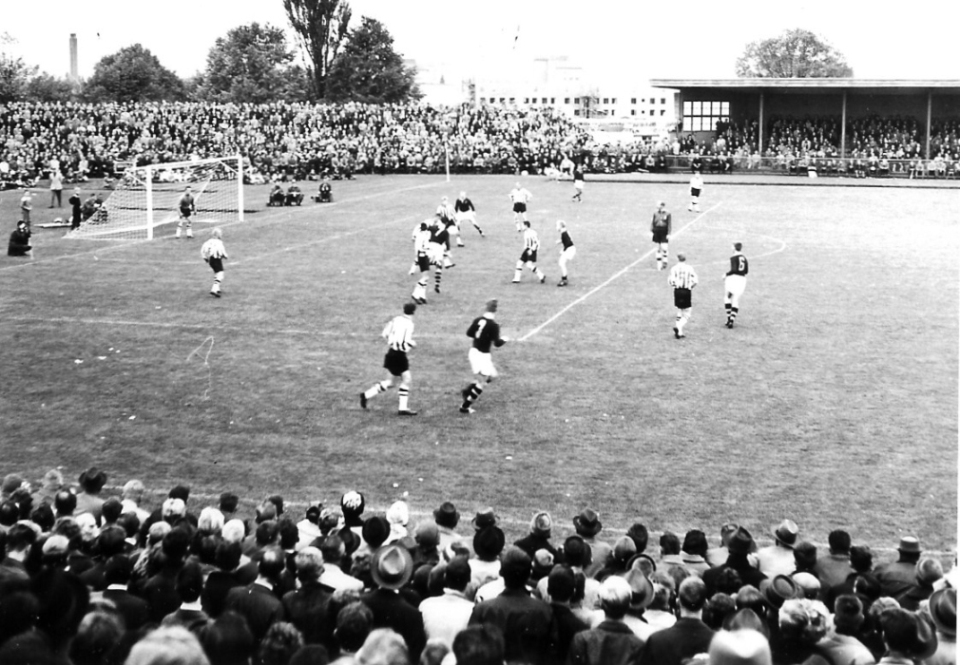
Landskrona BoIS playing a qualification game to Allsvenskan in 1962 at home against AIK. Attendance 16.010.

The club was relegated from Allsvenskan in 1949 and didn't return until the 1971 season, however Landskrona BoIS played qualification games for Allsvenskan in 1958, 1959, 1962 and 1968, all without success. In 1962, the qualification games took place through a four team group, with the clubs meeting each other only once . The third round was played at neutral grounds. When Landskrona BoIS game was finished, appeared to have secured promotion to Allsvenskan, but the other match, which had been delayed a few minutes, ended with a late goal, resulting in Stockholm's AIK securing an Allsvenskan spot instead. During this period the main star player was Hasse Persson. In the early 1960s, Claes Cronqvist had some success with the club, but moved after the 1965 season to Djurgårdens IF in Stockholm. The 1965 season was also the last one for the club's main star, Hasse Persson.

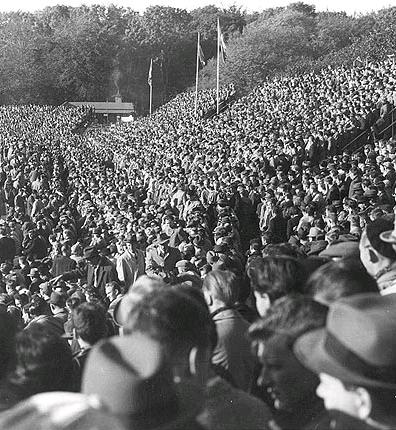
Photo of the north terraces stand. Late 1950s or early 1960s

=== 1970s ===
The two following seasons ended without any notable success. But the club had for a while had their eyes on a tall and muscular youth, in the local small club BK Landora, who played their home games at the B-pitch of Landskrona IP. A very talented but heavy centre forward, his name was Sonny Johansson. He, just like Claes Cronqvist in 1966, was of interest for the Stockholm club Djurgårdens IF. Together with his father Oscar, they made the long journey up to the Swedish capital. Everything looked like Sonny should put his signature on the transfer papers, but he didn't, stating that "dad would be so lonesome without me". After his return from the capital, Sonny did instead sign for Landskrona BoIS, and he would become true to his new club for his entire career over 17 seasons.

After rival club Helsingborg IF was relegated from Allsvenskan in 1968 (for its first time ever), and after having no success in the qualification to Allsvenskan in 1969, the year 1970 became a very important one for Landskrona BoIS. To reach the promotion qualifiers, they had to win at home against Helsingborgs IF, and so they did, with a single goal scored by the Danish player Leif Carlsen in front of more than 15,000 attenders. In the home game of the qualification for Allsvenskan, more than 15,000 attenders came to Landskrona IP again, and BoIS after goals by Tommy Gustafsson and Sonny Johansson, won 2–0 against Sandvikens IF. The away game was played in the northern town Luleå, just as the winter began at the 66th latitude. BoIS managed a goalless draw as result. In the final game, at neutral Nya Ullevi in Gothenburg, BoIS had to play Skövde AIK and at least another draw was required for the promotion. It began bad, as Skövde scored twice, but by goals from Sonny Johansson and Leif Carlsen, Landskrona BoIS finally managed to be promoted back to Allsvenskan, after an absence for 21 seasons. As a result of the success, the Danish player Leif Carlsen was forced to leave BoIS. By 1971, the Swedish Football Association didn't allow foreign players in Allsvenskan. During the 1971 season Landskrona BoIS managed to finish on 6th place, but won only 5 games. Their home average attendance during the season was 8,504 presumably their best ever (by 2014).

BoIS stayed in Allsvenskan for ten seasons, which included two bronze medals 1975 and 1976 and a Swedish Cup victory in 1972. During the 1970s their former rivals from Helsingborg had no luck in their attempts to return to Allsvenskan, and the main rivals instead became Malmö FF. In 1974 BoIS beat Malmö FF, with 2–1, for the first time at Malmö Stadion, in front of 24,746 attenders. Worse was the 1975 home game against Malmö FF, as the guests won 0–5, the attendance in Landskrona that year was though as high as 17,696, the second best attendance at IP.

The club's ever main star Sonny Johansson contributed to this in a major way. Sonny played for the club from 1968 to 1984 and scored more than 300 goals. He was the highest-scoring player in Allsvenskan during the 1970s. In 1971, Claes Cronqvist returned to the club and remained until the relegation in 1980. Unlike in the 1960s when he was a forward, he mostly played as defender during the 1970s. Cronqvist holds the record for being sent off more than any player in Allsvenskan, 7 times, including 5 times while representing BoIS (1971–80) and twice during his time with Djurgården.

In autumn 1978, the club got into problems. The supposed manager for the years to come, Lennart Söderberg, changed his mind in a very late stage, and suddenly the club was without a manager for the next season. After a hasty search, Ulf Schramm became manager. But already in the spring of 1979, the players began to make severe complaints to the chairman and board, suggesting that Schramm was "incompetent". This soon led to the dismissal of Schramm. At this time, within Swedish football, a dismissal of a manager in the middle of a season was a rare event. And Ulf Schramm eventually decided to process the club. Landskrona BoIS chairman of the time Claes Munck af Rosenschöld, who also was a solicitor, represented the club successfully during a trial that attracted some national attention. Schramm never appealed the matter.

After the 1973 energy crisis, times became hard for the Swedish shipyards. There were six large shipyards along the Swedish western coast. Three of them were located in Gothenburg and in Landskrona was the Öresundsvarvet shipyard, by far the town's largest employer with 3500 employees. By 1978 most shipyards were nationalised and threatened with closure. Then the club and its players decided to do something for Öresundsvarvet. In the Allsvenskan premiere match, Landskrona BoIS faced IFK Göteborg from Gothenburg away. Just before kick-off the BoIS players unfurled a banderole which got the large crowd to applaud the away team in a very rare manner. The banderole simply stated "Save the shipyards", which greatly also appealed to the Gothenburg audience.

In spring 1979 the club suddenly had no goalkeeper, as first goal keeper Ronny Sörensson and second goalkeeper Leif Hult both had suffered injuries. Minor ones, but nevertheless none of them could play the away game against IFK Sundsvall in Sundsvall. In the end, it was decided to put the goalkeeper coach Rolf Nilsson behind the posts. He was then 46 years, 8 months and 13 days old, which was, and still is, the record for the oldest player ever to play in Allsvenskan (as of March 2015). Nilsson conceded two goals, but BoIS won the game with 3–2. Örebro SK has used an even older goal keeper in the zeroes, but only as a substitute goal keeper who never got to play.

=== 1980s and early 1990s ===
The manager issue during the end of the 1970s and early 1980s led to a relegation from Allsvenskan, and ten consecutive seasons at the Swedish top level came to an end during the autumn of 1980. After having been close to reach qualification for Allsvenskan in 1983, the goal of a return to Allsvenskan ended the following season, as a relegation down to third tier of Swedish football followed 1984. This was the second time in the clubs' history that Landskrona BoIS had to play third-tier football. The first time was in 1952/53, and the club had then been promoted back after one season.

The difference between tier 2 and 3 was huge in 1985. As the second tier comprised two leagues only, North and South, a total of 28 clubs, while third tier was divided into twelve regional leagues, and 144 clubs in all. In order to get promotion, the clubs had both to win its own regional league, followed by a home and away qualification against any of the other third-tier league winners. Out of 12 league winners, 6 got promoted. The relegation from the higher league comprised the three last teams in both second-tier leagues, North and South.

An all-time low home attendance was noted on a rainy day in June 1985, as fewer than 400 people watched the club be defeated by Hittarp with a score of 1–2. In the regional league, after around half of the series, BoIS was excluded from the top by other clubs. However, after winning more games in combination with main contenders (Varbergs BoIS and Råå IF) began to lose their games, BoIS managed to win the league with several match days remaining. Now the away-home qualifying games against Linköpings FF would decide which club that would be promoted. Both games ended 1–1 and a penalty shoot-out became the final tie breaker. BoIS forward, the well-bearded Ole Jensen scored the winning penalty for the club in front of a crowd of 6,000, and Landskrona BoIS was back at the second level in Swedish football again. However, during the years 1986 until 1991, the club mostly had to fight to avoid a new relegation. In 1992 manager Conny Karlsson broke this trend, finishing on 3rd place. The following year, Karlsson got Landskrona BoIS promoted to Allsvenskan for the first time in 14 years.

=== 1994–1996 ===
However, the club chose not to prolong the contract with successful manager Conny Karlsson. Instead, the Dane Torben Storm became new manager. The club was relegated in the 1994 season. However, the relegation did not become definite until the last day of the season. Major financial troubles became evident during the later part of the season A temporary board, led by Allan Karlsson, now got the task from the club members, to take over after the former chairman. The club needed to sell some of their profile players, such as Andreas Jakobsson and Greger Andrijevski, and the club's financial troubles led to bad results in the second tier, Division 1 Södra. For the second year in a row, the club was relegated.

=== 1997–1999 ===
Now the temporary board brought the club's former legendary and celebrated striker Sonny Johansson back to the club as manager for a period of three years. And his first task, to bring the club back to the second tier of Swedish football was immediately accomplished during the 1997 season. And already the following season, 1998, Landskrona managed to become the runners-up in their league, just one single point behind the winners Kalmar FF. Only a lost home-away qualifier against Trelleborgs FF prevented a second promotion in a row for the club. During the 1999 season, a re-construction of the Swedish second tier was imminent. Instead of two geographical leagues, labeled as Division 1 South and North, the national Superettan would begin in 2000. Hence, it became imperative to finish the league at the upper half of the table, as the other half of the teams would be relegated. Landskrona BoIS secured their place in Superettan after a memorable game against Kristianstads FF. After 88 minutes, the score was 2–4 to Kristianstad, but when the referee blew his pipe this had changed into 5–4 to Landskrona BoIS.

=== 2000–2005 ===
During its first ever season, Landskrona BoIS managed to profile themselves in Superettan, and defeated Malmö FF away, but the club had to wait one season longer for promotion. They eventually become successful in the 2001 Superettan, securing promotion to Allsvenskan after winning against Assyriska in the final game. In the premiere in Allsvenskan 2002, Landskrona BoIS defeated local rivals Helsingborgs IF with 6–2 at home, after a hattrick scored by striker Danijel Milovanović. During the first half of the season, BoIS was in top of the league, and even leading the table. They finished on 11th place in 2002, 2003 and 2004, but were relegated after finishing on 12th place in 2005 and losing the qualification game against GAIS. Notable players during the latest period in the highest division were amongst others Danijel Milovanovic, Hasan Cetinkaya, Daniel Nannskog, Håkan Söderstjerna, Alexander Farnerud, and Jonas Olsson.

=== Since 2006 ===
Between 2006 and 2014, Landskrona BoIS have played nine consecutive seasons in the second highest division, Superettan. Swedish footballer Henrik Larsson was appointed manager of the club in 2009, and remained for three years before his departure following the 2012 season. Landskrona BoIS was relegated after the 2014 season and had to celebrate its hundredth birthday as a third-tier club. The 1998 to 2013 chairman, Kenneth Håkansson, who still was a member of the board, refused to answer criticism asked by the local newspaper. The club was relegated to the third tier (a division split in two regional leagues) just before the club's 100 year anniversary, in the 2014 season. After three years outside Swedish elite football, the club managed to return to Superettan for the 2018 season. This began rather well and included a memorable 1–1 tie vs local rivals Helsingborg IF in front 8.192 spectators, the highest home attendance since Allsvenskan in 2005. BoIS equalized a late HIF score around the 90th minute. But during the summer most went all wrong, and the club had to face a relegation and return to the third tier. After a failed qualification (vs Öster) for Superettan in 2019, the club managed to gain promotion to the second tier in December 2020, and finished the 2021 Superettan campaign in 6th place.

== Ownership ==
Landskrona BoIS, like most Swedish sports clubs, is a non-profit association, run by a board which is elected annually by the club's members.

== Stadiums ==
=== Banan 1915 to 1924 ===
Landskrona BoIS previously played in the middle of a simple kind of cycling track, locally referred to as "Banan" (English: the track or the lane). Football in Landskrona first became introduced at "Banan", and this ground, built in 1893, became the initial home of Landskrona BoIS, and its in 1915 merged predecessors IK Diana and IFK Landskrona.

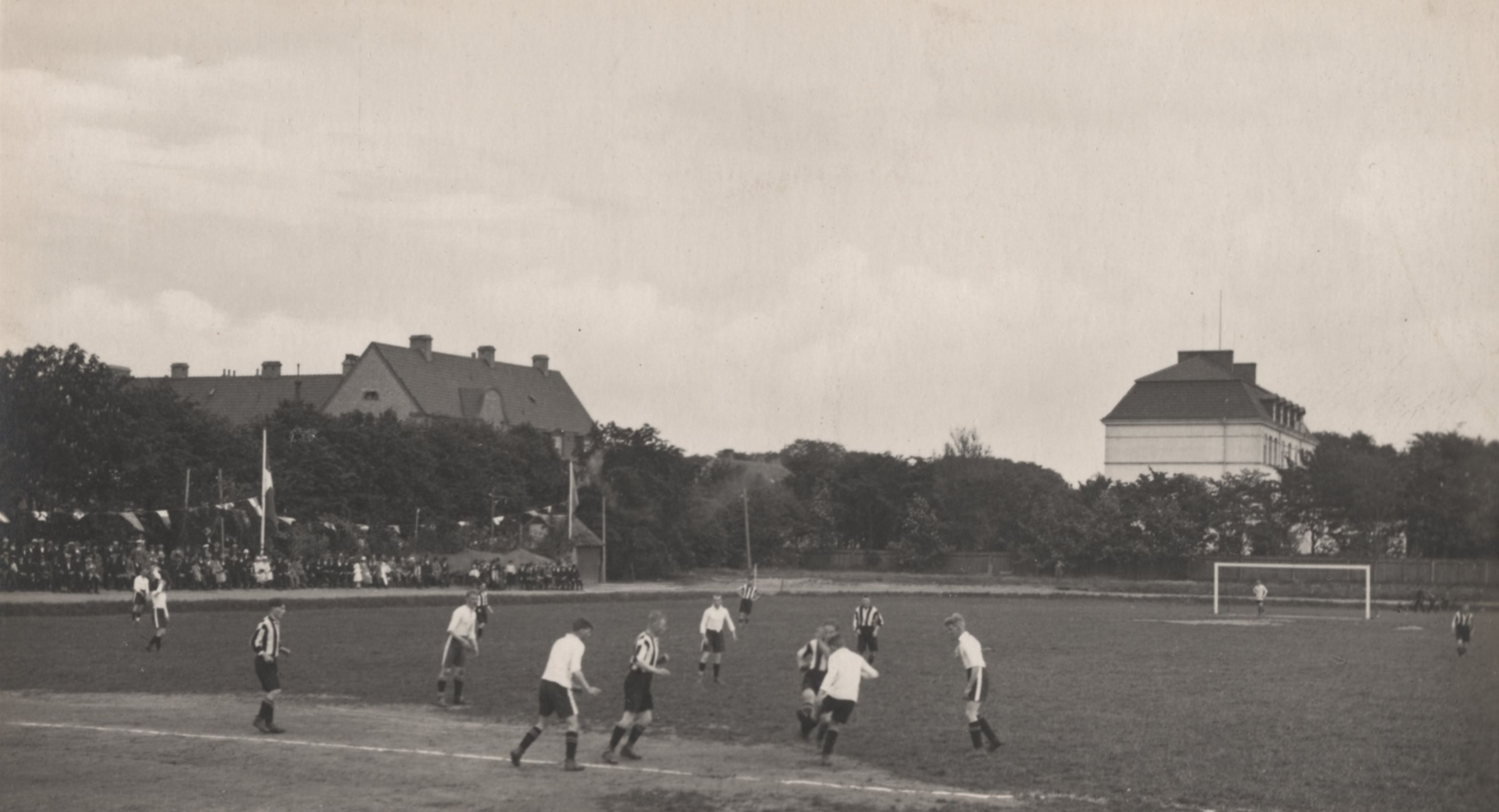
"Banan" was initially intended for cycling, but football was eventually also played there.

=== IP since 1924 ===
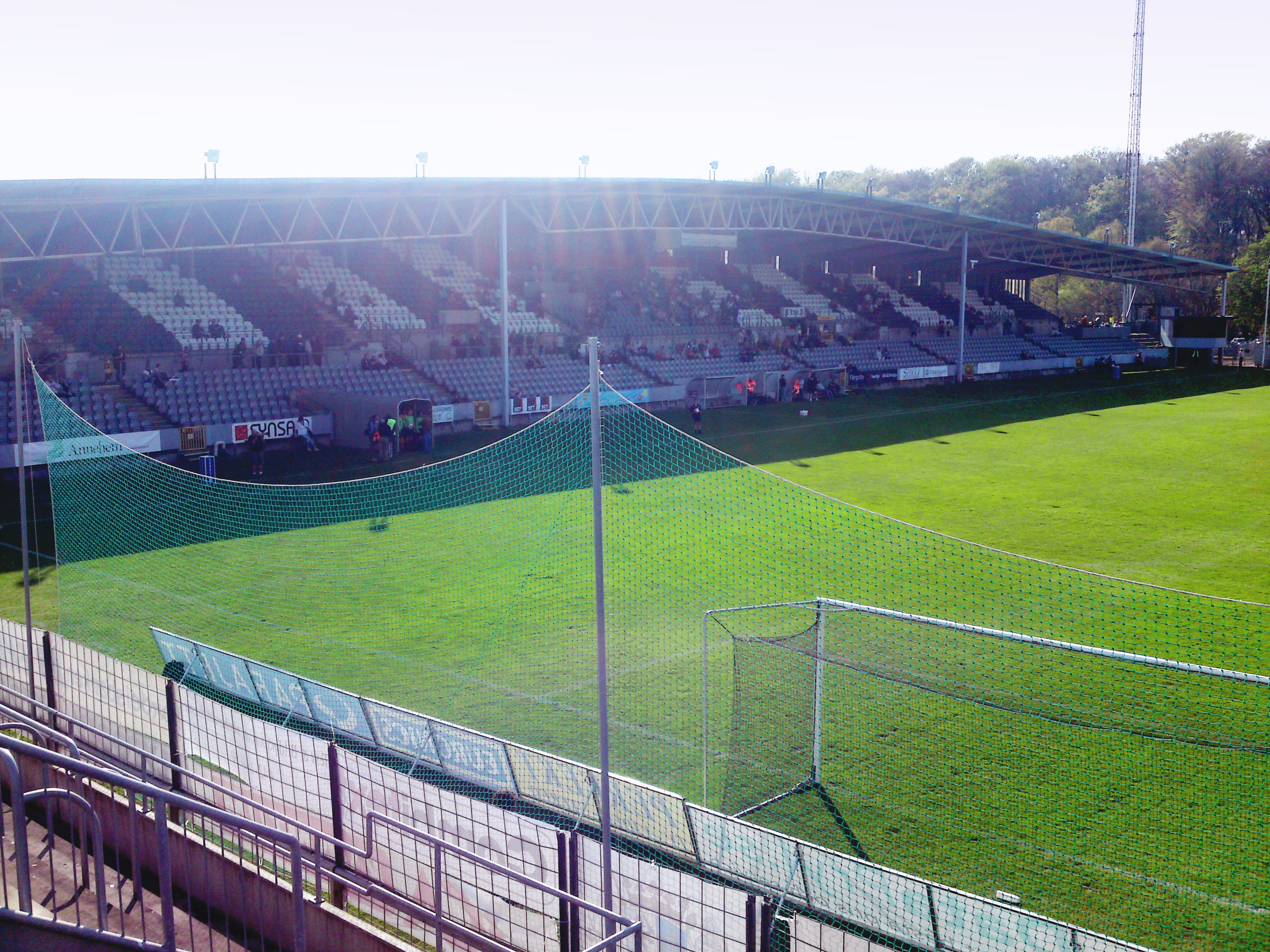
Landskrona Idrottsplats.

Since its construction in 1924, the same year as the inaugural Allsvenskan season, Landskrona IP has been the home of Landskrona BoIS. The first ever match at this venue was played between Landskrona BoIS and B 1903 from Denmark, which the Danish club won with 3–2.

The first Allsvenskan match at Landskrona IP was on 10 August 1924, when BoIS played IFK Göteborg and lost 4–0.

The record attendance of 18,535 was set on 18 October 1959 in a qualifying match to Allsvenskan, against Degerfors IF. Within Allsvenskan, the highest attendance is 17,697 against Malmö FF in 1975.

In the autumn of 2013, the Landskrona BoIS board suggested that the stadium should switch from natural grass to artificial turf. This led to protests from supporter groups, both in the form of banners at matches and protest petitions on the internet. The stadium, Landskrona IP is owned and run by the municipality of Landskrona, and as the protests reached the local municipality politicians, it was decided to keep the natural grass.

=== Top ten home attendances ===
1. 18,535 vs Degerfors IF at 14 October 1959, qualification for Allsvenskan
2. 17,696 vs Malmö FF at 6 June 1975, Allsvenskan
3. 16,010 vs AIK at 21 October 1962, qualification for Allsvenskan
4. 15,685 vs Sandvikens IF at 10 October 1970, qualification for Allsvenskan
5. 15,514 vs Malmö FF at 6 June 1973, Allsvenskan
6. 15,116 vs Jönköping Södra IF at mid-October 1968, qualification for Allsvenskan
7. 15,114 vs Örgryte IS at 19 October 1958, qualification for Allsvenskan
8. 15,036 vs Malmö FF at 12 September 1971, Allsvenskan
9. 15,015 vs Helsingborg IF at 29 August 1970, Division 2 (second tier)
10. 14,693 vs Malmö FF at 12 September 1974, Allsvenskan

After the reconstructions at Landskrona IP in 1990 and 1991, the attendance capacity at the venue was reduced to between 10,000 and 12,000 (depending on several changes at the western end). Top five attendances after 1991 are:

1. 11,902 vs Helsingborg IF at 6 April 2002, Allsvenskan
2. 11,375 vs Malmö FF at 4 August 2003, Allsvenskan
3. 11,036 vs Helsingborg IF at 3 April 2004, Allsvenskan
4. 10,376 vs Helsingborg IF at 24 May 1992, Second tier
5. 10,181 vs AIK at 8 July 2002, Allsvenskan$*$

$*/$ At this event the venue was overcrowded and the police closed the entrance for the terraced stands. The police also removed advertising behind the western goal, in order for more attendees who had paid their ground fee to be able to watch the game. Afterward did the club's chairman at the time apologize to the advertisers – but not to the paying attendees who could not see much. (The temporary western stands from the Helsingborgs IF match had been removed, which explains how 11.902 was not equally overcrowded just three months earlier).

=== Average attendances ===
Season	Average home attendance	Highest home attendance	Average away attendance	Highest away attendance	Division	Level	Average league attendance
2002	7 546	11 902 vs. Helsingborg	9 924	24 570 vs. Malmö	Allsvenskan	Tier 1	10 180
2003	6 436 **	11 375 vs. Malmö	8 728	23 081 vs. Malmö	Allsvenskan	Tier 1	10 208
2004	5 881	11 036 vs. Helsingborg	8 526	18 824 vs. Malmö	Allsvenskan	Tier 1	9 768
2005	5 660	9 649 vs. Malmö	6 762	15 047 vs. Helsingborg	Allsvenskan	Tier 1	8 691
2006	3 192	4 290 vs. Jönköping	2 027	4 517 vs. Norrköping	Superettan	Tier 2	2 105
2007	2 972	4 199 vs. Enköping	2 579	7 193 vs. Norrköping	Superettan	Tier 2	2 450
2008	2 752	3 873 vs. Enköping	1 846	4 569 vs. LB07	Superettan	Tier 2	1 557
2009	2 307	3 036 vs. Ängelholm	1 889	3 596 vs. Sundsvall	Superettan	Tier 2	1 880
2010	3 123	4 467 vs. Degerfors	2 251	5 239 vs. Hammarby	Superettan	Tier 2	2 572
2011	2 929	4 040 vs. Värnamo; 4 833 vs. Helsingborg (cup)	2,664	12,081 vs. Hammarby	Superettan	Tier 2	2,423
2012	2 459	3 450 vs. Hammarby	2 119	6 802 vs. Hammarby	Superettan	Tier 2	2 456
2013	2 142	3 028 vs. Falkenberg	2 361	8 721 vs. Hammarby	Superettan	Tier 2	2 957
2014	1 811	2 885 vs. Hammarby	3 112	16 582 vs. Hammarby	Superettan	Tier 2	3 267
2015	1 734	4 064 vs. Örgryte	978	2 892 vs. Eskilsminne; 10 419 vs. Hammarby (cup)	Division 1	Tier 3	795
2016	1 802	3 346 vs. Kristianstad; 5 125 vs. Malmö (cup)	952	3 786 vs. Öster	Division 1	Tier 3	732
2017	2 346	4 036 vs. Karlskrona	768	2 744 vs. Mjällby	Division 1	Tier 3	633
2018	2 392	8 192 vs. Helsingborg	2 392	13 395 vs. Helsingborg	Superettan	Tier 2	2 278
2019	2 146	2 146 vs. Trollhättan	481	481 vs. Oddevold	Division 1	Tier 3	579

* Attendances are provided in the Publikliga sections of the Svenska Fotbollförbundet website.
** The game versus AIK was played at Olympia, Helsingborg due to a strike

== Chairmen ==
During its first 65 years of existence, the club had a very stable chairmanship. From 1915 until 1980 only three persons had this title, Bror Nilsson, Harry Wibratt and Claes Munck af Rosenschöld (forgetting one single year, 1936, in which Bror Nilsson's brother, Thure had this title). Perhaps sadly, this stability vanished in the 1980s. Between 1981 and 1995, the club had to use no less than 7 chairmen. With the arrival of Kenneth Håkansson a kind of stability returned. Håkansson doubtlessly had several benefits, and will be remembered for the 2002–2005 Allsvenskan spell. But beginning in 2005, he came up with various ideas of a new stadium. Every new such idea included a smaller but more expensive version. By 2010 he began proposing for brand new so-called "multi-venue" in the blowy harbour area, for just 6000 attenders. As this idea was rejected also by his closer associates, the focal point returned to changes of the club's current venue, Landskrona IP instead. Towards the end of the 2013 season, he and his board made a request to Landskrona Municipality, to get artificial turf at the stadium pitch. In Sweden, artificial turf had become popular in areas where the winter climate is much colder compared to Scania's. But football stadiums in Scania, as well as along the Swedish western coast, all were using real grass (and still is as of 2017). As Håkansson didn't listen to the club's supporters during several home matches, a public appeal in the local newspaper initiated protests of an unanticipated magnitude. The local politicians, who first had assumed that artificial turf would be popular, now decided not to grant the Landskrona BoIS board proposal of artificial turf. And this soon lead to Håkansson's fall as chairman, and due to the 2014 season relegation from Superettan to the third and regional tier, and for the club's 100 year celebration season in 2015, he also left the board entirely. Håkansson's service for the club will nevertheless be remembered together with the names of the other long term serving chairmen – Bror Nilsson, Harry Wibratt and Claes Munck af Rosenschöld. His successor Gabriel Munck has with modest means done well, and Landskrona BoIS managed to win their regional third-tier league in 2017, and will from 2018 again play in Superettan.

As Gabriel Munck, after the promotion to Superettan, declared his wish to resign as chairman due to private reasons, an intern struggle for the chairmanship arose. When the nomination committee put their name forward, two other men also declared their wishes to become the new chairman. A unique situation for the club. The annual meeting had to be cancelled before it even began. A few days later, at 5 March in Folkets Hus (The People's House), the annual meeting could be held, and Urban Jansson was elected as the new chairman.

Name	Years
Bror Nilsson	1915–1935
Thure Nilsson	1936
Bror Nilsson	1937–1947
Harry Wibratt	1948–1963
Claes Munck af Rosenschöld	1964–1980
Rolf Johansson	1981–1982
Göran Olsson	1983–1984
Stefan Nilsson	1985–1986
Krister Clerselius	1987–1988
Björn Lind	1989–1990
Kent Nilsson	1991–1994
Allan Karlsson	1994–1995
Kenneth Håkansson	1996–2014
Gabriel Munck	2014–2018
Urban Jansson	2018–2021
Anders Ekbladh	2021–present

== Supporters ==
The largest supporter club is called Black & White, and was established in 1993. And in the winter before the upcoming season of Allsvenskan, where Landskrona made a comeback after several years in the lower divisions, was the supporter club made a formal institution with annual meetings and a board. Black & White have published the fanzine "Halvtid" ("Half Time") a bit now and then since 1994. Since the building of Landskrona IP in 1924, the singing supporters have always stood on the part of IP (the northern stand terraces) which occasionally is called the "English Stand" (Swedish: Engelska Läktaren). The majority of the club's supporters are from the city of Landskrona, but they also draw support from nearby towns such as Svalöv, Eslöv, Kävlinge, Löddeköpinge and Lund. A group of supporters in Stockholm also exists.

=== Rivalries ===
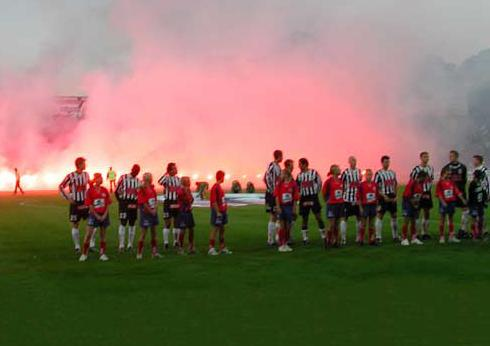
Landskrona BoIS players at the home derby against Helsingborgs IF in 2003.

The main rivals have varied throughout history. Helsingborgs IF is by many supporters considered the greatest rival. The cities are geographically close to each other, and the supporters of the two teams hold a certain grudge, which dates back to the beginning of the 20th century. There is also a rivalry between Landskrona and Malmö FF, which reaches back to the 1930s. During the successful 1970s, Malmö FF was definitely the only rival, as Helsingborg didn't participate in Allsvenskan. The derby matches between the teams from Scania are called Skånederbyn. In a poll from 2005, Landskrona supporters were asked which club was most important to beat during the season. A majority answered Helsingborgs IF (with 64.6% of the votes) followed by Malmö FF (26.9%).

== Crest and colours ==
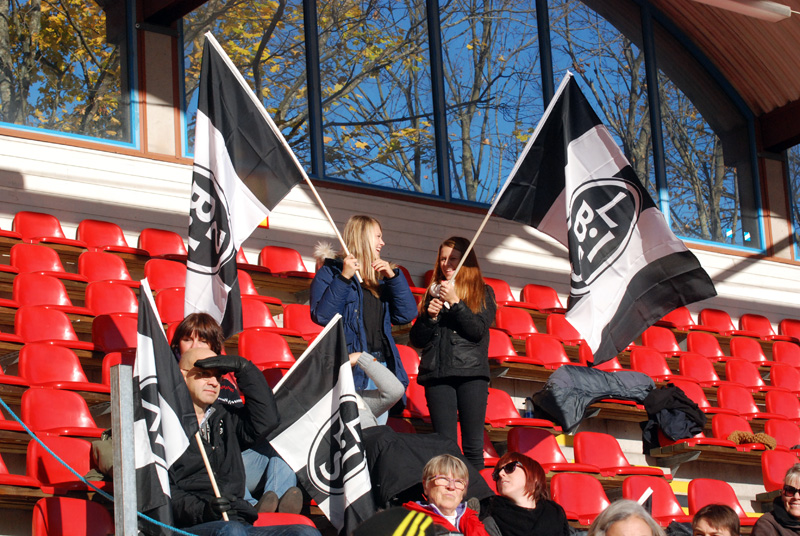
Landskrona BoIS supporters waving flags with the clubs crest.

For Landskrona's first season, they wore a black and white striped shirt with black shorts and white socks. The same home shirts have become standard. The away shirts have traditionally always been a red top with black shorts, however there are a few exceptions. In 2003, the away shirt was in the colors of the Scanian flag; a bright yellow top with red shorts. In the 2012 and 2013 season the club changed to a pink top with white shorts, initially supporting breast cancer awareness. In the 2018 season the club switched to an away shirt and shorts completely in burgundy, which they played in for three seasons. In 2021 the club honored its classic nickname Scania's Uruguayans by playing in a light blue away shirt with black shorts similar to the Uruguay national team.

=== Kits ===
Period	Kit manufacturer	Home shirt color(s)	Away shirt color(s)
1989	(Germany) Adidas	Black & White	Red
1990–1992	(Italy) Erreà	Black & White	Red
1993–1999	(England) Umbro	Black & White	Red
2000–2004	(United States) Nike	Black & White	Red/Yellow
2005–2006	(Denmark) Hummel	Black & White	White, Black
2007–2011	(England) Umbro	Black & White	Red
2012–2014	(Netherlands) Masita	Black & White	Pink/Red
2015–2017	(Netherlands) Stanno	Black & White	Red
2018–	(United States) Nike	Black & White	Burgundy/Light Blue/Red

== Players ==
=== First-team squad ===
As of 1 September 2026

Note: Flags indicate national team as defined under FIFA eligibility rules; some limited exceptions apply. Players may hold more than one non-FIFA nationality.

No.	Pos.	Nation	Player
1	GK	PLE	Amr Kaddoura
2	DF	SWE	William Åkesson (on loan from Malmö)
3	DF	SWE	Gustaf Westström
4	DF	SWE	Gustaf Bruzelius
5	MF	SWE	Adam Egnell
6	DF	SWE	Tobias Karlsson
7	FW	FIN	Salomo Ojala
8	MF	SWE	Allen Smajić
9	FW	KOS	Edi Sylisufaj
10	MF	SWE	Constantino Capotondi
12	DF	CMR	Emmanuel Moungam
13	MF	JPN	Kota Sakurai

No.	Pos.	Nation	Player
14	FW	DEN	Mathias Andreasen
15	MF	SWE	Max'Med Omar Mohamed
18	DF	SWE	André Álvarez Pérez
21	FW	SWE	Kevin Jensen
23	MF	SWE	Zakaria Loukili (on loan from Malmö)
26	DF	SWE	Andreas Murbeck
27	FW	DEN	Roni Arabaci
28	DF	SWE	Maximilian Milosevic
30	GK	SWE	Marcus Pettersson
31	GK	SWE	Albin Andersson
36	FW	SWE	Enes Hebibović

=== Out on loan ===
Note: Flags indicate national team as defined under FIFA eligibility rules; some limited exceptions apply. Players may hold more than one non-FIFA nationality.

No.	Pos.	Nation	Player
11	FW	SWE	Markus Björkqvist (at AFC Malmö until 30 November 2026)
17	MF	ALB	Gent Elezaj (at Hammarby Talang FF until 30 November 2026)
20	FW	KEN	Xavier Odhiambo (at VPS until 31 December 2026)

No.	Pos.	Nation	Player
22	FW	SWE	Christian Stark (at Eskilsminne IF until 30 November 2026)
—	MF	SWE	Linus Bruun (at Hässleholm until 30 November 2026)

=== Notable players ===
List criteria:

- Played at least 100 matches for Landskrona BoIS.
- Represented their national team as a Landskrona BoIS player, or with BoIS as club of origin.
- Very special efforts of historical signification.

Sweden

- Albin Dahl
- Harry Dahl
- Knut Hansson
- Sigvard Pettersson
- Hasse Persson
- Kjell Lindstrand
- Claes Cronqvist
- Sonny Johansson
- Tommy Gustafsson
- Stefan Nilsson
- Göran Petersson
- Per-Åke Theander
- Mats Aronsson
- Joakim Nilsson
- Håkan Söderstjerna
- Pontus Farnerud
- Alexander Farnerud
- Danijel Milovanović
- Daniel Nannskog
- Johan Andersson
- Jörgen Pettersson
- Jonas Olsson
- Matthias Eklund
- Linus Malmqvist

The "best starting eleven of the 21st century" as voted by the Landskrona supporters in 2013.

Denmark

- (Denmark) Leif Carlsen
- (Denmark) Allan Ravn

Estonia

- (Estonia) Indrek Zelinski

Finland

- (Finland) Antti Okkonen

Gambia

- (The Gambia) Alagie Sosseh

Ghana

- (Ghana) Afo Dodoo

Iceland

- (Iceland) Auðun Helgason

Nigeria

- (Nigeria) Kevin Amuneke

Rwanda

- (Rwanda) Bobo Bola

Scotland

- (Scotland) Stuart Baxter

USA

- (United States) Christopher Sullivan

=== National team players ===
- This list includes all players who have represented a national team on senior level, while playing for Landskrona BoIS.
- (Sweden) Albin Dahl (1919–1922)
- (Sweden) Birger Dahlgren (1921)
- (Sweden) Harry Dahl (1923–1930)
- (Sweden) Carl Huldt (1929)
- (Sweden) Svante Kvist (1929)
- (Sweden) Erik Linder (1929–1939)
- (Sweden) Fritz Lindfors (1929)
- (Sweden) Axel Johansson (1930)
- (Sweden) John Nilsson (1930)
- (Sweden) Knut Hansson (1933–1938)
- (Sweden) Curt Bergsten (1935–1938)
- (Sweden) Arthur Karlsson (1935)
- (Sweden) Henning Pettersson (1935)
- (Sweden) Harry Nilsson (1938–1942)
- (Sweden) Erik Persson (1938–1942)
- (Sweden) Erik Andersson (1939)
- (Sweden) Claes Cronqvist (1971–1974)
- (Sweden) Jörgen Augustsson (1976–1977)
- (Sweden) Sonny Johansson (1977)
- (Sweden) Alexander Farnerud (2003)
- (Estonia) Indrek Zelinski (2003)
- (Iceland) Auðun Helgason (2003–2004)
- (Finland) Antti Okkonen (2004–2006)
- (Sweden) Jonas Sandqvist (2005)
- (Nigeria) Kevin Amuneke (2005)
- (Rwanda) Bobo Bola (2005–2008)
- (The Gambia) Alagie Sosseh (2010)
- (Lebanon) Mohamed Ramadan (2015)
- (Islamic Republic of Afghanistan) Saber Azizi (2016–2017)
- (Palestine) Amr Kaddoura (2021–)

== Club officials ==
=== Organisation ===
As of 4 March 2021.

Role	Name	Nation
The Board
Chairman	Anders Ekbladh	(Sweden)
Vice chairman	Daniel Stålhammar	(Sweden)
Secretary	Torgny Andersen	(Sweden)
Member	Lars Andersson	(Sweden)
Member	Mats Ekeroth	(Sweden)
Member	Patrik Hartvig	(Sweden)
Member	Johanna Ingvaldson	(Sweden)
Member	Lennart Neander	(Sweden)
Member	Charlotte Wall	(Sweden)

=== Technical staff ===
As of 4 July 2021.

Role	Name	Nation
Manager	Billy Magnusson	(Sweden)
Assistant coach	Max Mölder	(Sweden)
Goalkeeping coach	Ignacio Sánchez	(Chile)
Analyst	Amir Jakirlić	(Sweden)
Fitness coach	Jonny Karlsson	(Sweden)
Physiotherapist	Tomas Mårtensson	(Sweden)
Naprapath	Markus Nilsson	(Sweden)
Youth team responsible	Tobias Celedón	(Sweden)

== Statistics ==
=== Top scorer by season ===
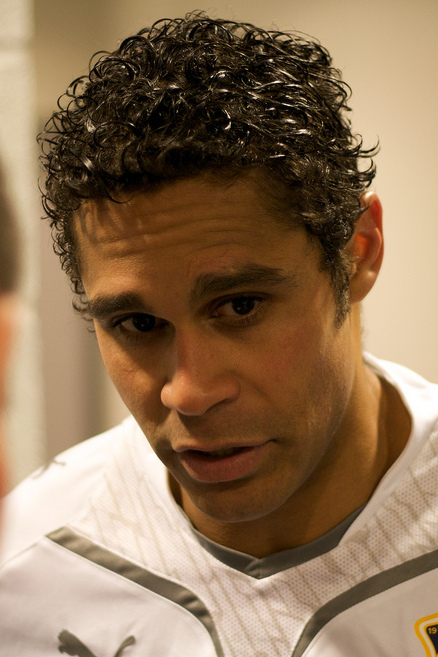
Daniel Nannskog became the topscorer in Landskrona BoIS, as well as in the whole Superettan league in 2001.

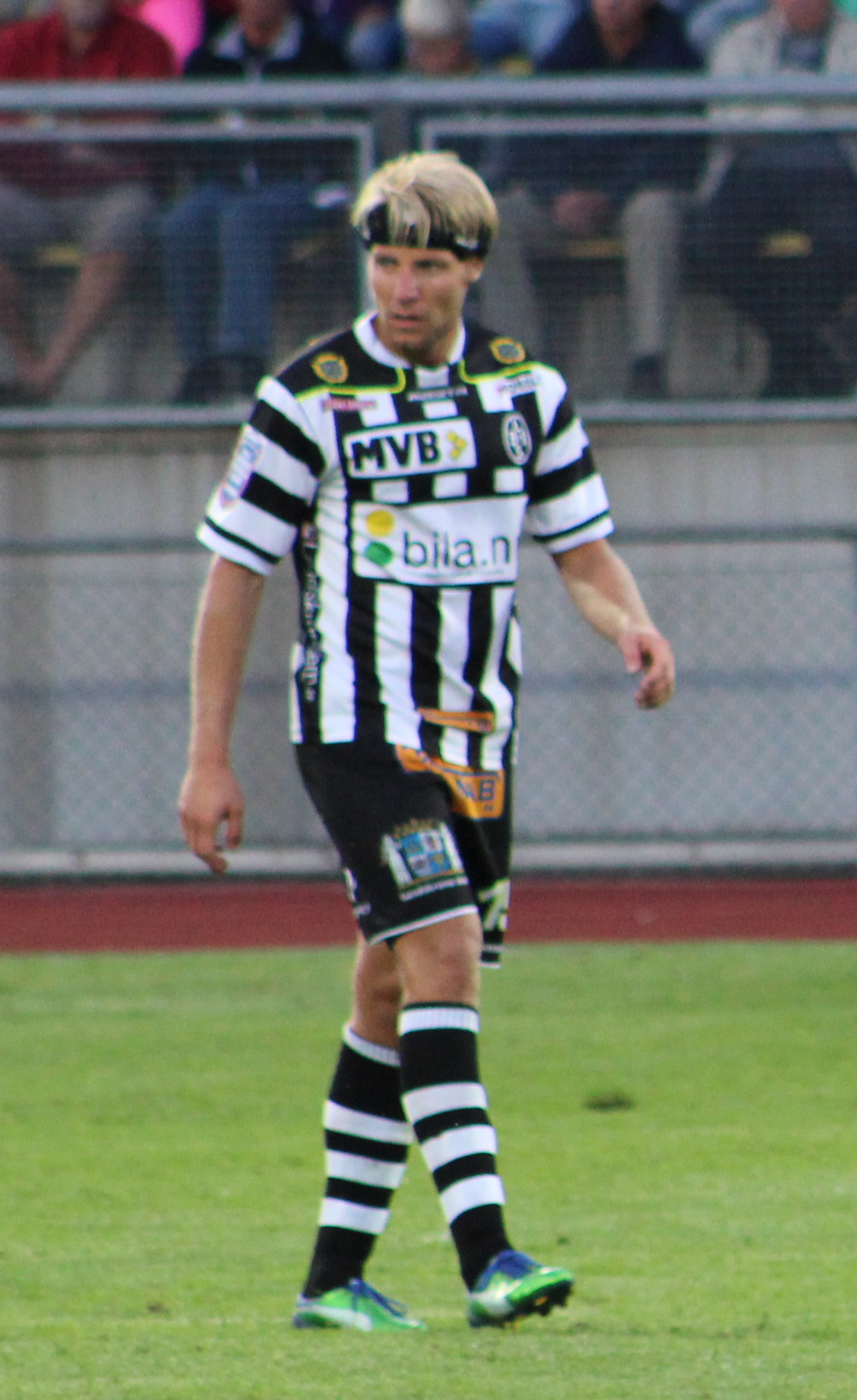
Fredrik Karlsson, top scorer in 2010 and 2013.

Season	Player	Country	Goals
2000	Danijel Milovanovic	(Sweden)	11
	Håkan Söderstjerna	(Sweden)	11
2001	Daniel Nannskog	(Sweden)	21
2002	Daniel Nannskog	(Sweden)	11
2003	Matthias Eklund	(Sweden)	5
	Alexander Farnerud	(Sweden)	5
2004	Kevin Amuneke	(Nigeria)	7
2005	Kevin Amuneke	(Nigeria)	7
2006	Matthias Eklund	(Sweden)	10
2007	Pär Cederqvist	(Sweden)	9
2008	Pär Cederqvist	(Sweden)	7
2009	Pär Cederqvist	(Sweden)	14
	Fredrik Olsson	(Sweden)	14
2010	Fredrik Karlsson	(Sweden)	12
2011	Ajsel Kujović	(Sweden)	7
	Fredrik Olsson	(Sweden)	7
2012	Fredrik Olsson	(Sweden)	9
2013	Fredrik Karlsson	(Sweden)	9
	Fredrik Olsson	(Sweden)	9
2014	Andrew Stadler	(United States)	13
2015	Admir Aganović	(Bosnia and Herzegovina)	7
2016	Erik Pärsson	(Sweden)	17
2017	Sadat Karim	(Ghana)	19
2018	Sadat Karim	(Ghana)	11
2019	Linus Olsson	(Sweden)	9
2020	Linus Olsson	(Sweden)	12

=== European participations ===
Season	Competition	Round		Club	Score
1972	Intertoto Cup	GR	(West Germany)	Eintracht Braunschweig	3–0, 0–2
			(Czechoslovakia)	TJ ZVL Žilina	2–2, 0–1
			(Denmark)	Vejle BK	0–0, 2–1
1972/73	UEFA Cup Winners' Cup	1R	(Romania)	Rapid București	1–0, 0–3
1974	Intertoto Cup	GR	(Portugal)	CUF Barreiro	1–1, 0–1
			(Turkey)	Altay S.K.	1–1, 1–1
			(Sweden)	Hammarby IF	4–0, 2–1
1976	Intertoto Cup	GR	(Czechoslovakia)	TJ Sklo Union Teplice	1–1, 0–0
			(West Germany)	Kickers Offenbach	1–2, 0–1
			(Switzerland)	Grasshopper Club Zürich	0–0, 0–1
1977	Intertoto Cup	GR	(Czechoslovakia)	Slavia Prague	3–5, 1–6
			(Poland)	Legia Warszawa	1–2, 0–1
			(Switzerland)	BSC Young Boys	2–1, 0–4
1977/78	UEFA Cup	1R	(England)	Ipswich Town F.C.	0–1, 0–5

== Managerial history ==
- (C) – Caretaker

List of recent managers
- 1947–1947: (England) Billy Burnikell
- 1949–1949: (England) Billy Burnikell (C)
- 1954–1956: (Sweden) Albin Dahl
- ????–1963: (Sweden) Gunnar Anderberg
- 1964–1964: (Hungary) Sándor Somfai
- 1965–1966: (Sweden) John Wikdahl
- 1970–1971: (Sweden) Karl-Erik Hult
- 1972–1976: (Sweden) Rolf Svensson
- 1977–1978: (Denmark) Finn Willy Sørensen
- 1979–1979: (Sweden) Ulf Schramm
- 1979–1979: (Sweden) Lennart Olsson (C)
- 1979–1980: (England) Keith Spurgeon
- 1981–1982: (England) Frank Marshall
- 1983–1985: (Sweden) Claes Cronqvist
- 1986–1986: (Denmark) Kurt Stendal
- 1987–1989: (Sweden) Rolf Svensson
- 1989–1990: (Sweden) Tommy Gustavsson
- 1990–1990: (Sweden) Sonny Johansson
- 1991–1993: (Sweden) Conny Karlsson
- 1994–1995: (Denmark) Torben Storm
- 1995–1996: (Sweden) Anders Ljungberg
- 1997–1999: (Sweden) Sonny Johansson
- 2000–2000: (Sweden) Reine Almqvist
- 2001–2004: (Sweden) Jan Jönsson
- 2004–2004: (Sweden) Roar Hansen (C)
- 2004–2005: (Sweden) Mats Jingblad
- 2006–2007: (Sweden) Patrik Johansson
- 2008–2009: (Sweden) Anders Linderoth
- 2010–2012: (Sweden) Henrik Larsson
- 2013–2014: (Sweden) Jörgen Pettersson
- 2014–2014: (Sweden) Patrik Johansson (C)
- 2015–2015: (Sweden) Zvezdan Milošević
- 2015–2015: (Sweden) Billy Magnusson (C)
- 2016–2018: (Sweden) Agim Sopi
- 2018–2018: (Sweden) Fahrudin Karišik (C)
- 2018–2018: (Denmark) Jack Majgaard Jensen
- 2019–2023: (Sweden) Billy Magnusson
- 2023–2025: (Sweden) Max Mölder
- 2025–: (Sweden) Robin Asterhed

=== Notable managers ===
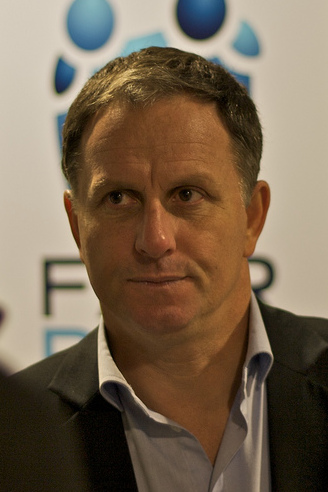
Jan Jönsson, who coached Landskrona BoIS back into Allsvenskan in 2001.

The managers are listed according to their first season as manager for Landskrona BoIS:

List criteria:

- Won at least one medal in Allsvenskan or Svenska Cupen, or gained promotion with Landskrona BoIS.

- Managed the team for at least 5 years.

Name	Nat	Years	Honours
Karl-Erik Hult	(Sweden)	1970–1971	1 Division II win, gained promotion to Allsvenskan.
Rolf Svensson	(Sweden)	1972–1976, 1987–1989	8 years in total. 1 Svenska Cupen win, 1 silver. 2 Allsvenskan bronze.
Claes Cronqvist	(Sweden)	1983–1985	1 Svenska Cupen silver, promotion to Division 2.
Sonny Johansson	(Sweden)	1990, 1997–1999	1 Division 2 Södra win, gained promotion to Division 1 Södra in 1997.
Conny Karlsson	(Sweden)	1991–1993	1 Division 1 Södra win, promotion to Allsvenskan. 1 Svenska Cupen silver.
Jan Jönsson	(Sweden)	2001–2004	Superettan runners-up in 2001, gained promotion to Allsvenskan.
Agim Sopi	(Sweden)	2016–2018	1 Division 1 Södra win, gained promotion to Superettan.
Billy Magnusson	(Sweden)	2015, 2019–2023	Ettan Södra runners-up in 2019 and 2020, gained promotion to Superettan.

== Achievements ==
- 34 seasons in the Highest Swedish League
- 54 seasons in the Second Highest Swedish League
- 9 seasons in the Third Highest Swedish League

The club has never played below the third highest league in Swedish football.

=== League ===
- Allsvenskan:
  - 3rd place, little silver (1): 1937–38
  - 4th place, bronze (3): 1938–39, 1975, 1976
- Second division:
  - Winners (10): 1933–34, 1943–44, 1945–46, 1947–48, 1957–58, 1959, 1962, 1968, 1970, 1993
  - Runners-up (8): 1941–42, 1946–47, 1956–57, 1960, 1965, 1992, 1998, 2001

Known as Division 2 Södra, Division 2 Östra, Division 1 Södra and Superettan.

- Third division:
  - Winners (4): 1952–53, 1985, 1997, 2017
  - Runners-up (2): 2019, 2020

Known as Division 3 Södra, Division 2 Södra and Division 1 Södra.

=== Cups ===
- Svenska Cupen:
  - Winners (1): 1971–72
  - Runners-up (4): 1949, 1975–76, 1983–84, 1992–93
- Skånska Mästerskapet:
  - Winners (4): 1923, 1930, 1935, 1936
  - Runners-up (1): 1926
- Distriktsmästerskapet:
  - Winners (2): 2016, 2022
  - Runners-up (1): 2015

== Footnotes ==
A Current youth players who at least have sat on the bench in a competitive match.
