= List of Swedish football champions (players) =

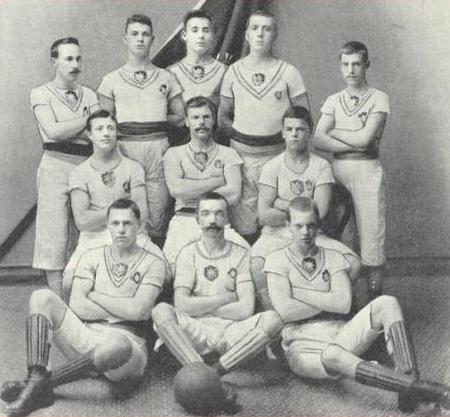
Örgryte IS in 1896, the first Swedish football champions

Swedish football champions (Swedish: Svenska mästare i fotboll) is a title held by the winners of the highest Swedish football league played each year, Allsvenskan. The title has been contested since 1896 in varying forms of competition. The first Swedish Champions, Örgryte IS, were declared in 1896 when the club won the cup tournament Svenska Mästerskapet. This happened before there existed any Swedish national association, which was not created until 1904. The winners of Svenska Mästerskapet between 1896 and 1904 have retroactively been declared holders of the title by the Swedish Football Association (SvFF). After the creation of the SvFF, the title continued to be held by the winners of Svenska Mästerskapet until 1925, even though a Swedish first national league, Svenska Serien, started in 1910. Svenska Mästerskapet was discontinued in 1925.

In 1924–25, a new Swedish national league was created, Allsvenskan, but the Swedish Champions title wasn't awarded to the winners of that league until 1930–31. Since then, the winners of Allsvenskan are considered Swedish Champions, with a few exceptions. Between 1982 and 1990, the title was given to the winners of a play-off held after Allsvenskan was finished, and the following two years, 1991 and 1992, the title was given to the winners of Mästerskapsserien, a continuation league with the best teams from Allsvenskan.

Below is a list of the players awarded medals.

== Players ==
=== A ===
- Patrick Amoah – Djurgården 2005
- Bernt Andersson – Djurgården 1954–55, 1964
- Karl-Erik Andersson – Djurgården 1954–55
- Hans Andersson-Tvilling – Djurgården 1954–55
- Kári Árnason – Djurgården 2005
- Johan Arneng – Djurgården 2003, 2005
- Lars Arnesson – Djurgården 1964
- Arne Arvidsson – Djurgården 1954–55, 1959, 1964

=== B ===
- Ibrahim Ba – Djurgården 2005
- Gösta Backlund – Djurgården 1912
- Yannick Bapupa – Djurgården 2002, 2003
- Stefan Bärlin – Djurgården 2002
- Abgar Barsom – Djurgården 2002, 2005
- Stefan Bergtoft – Djurgården 2002, 2003, 2005
- Lars Broström – Djurgården 1959

=== C ===
- Pär Cederqvist – Djurgården 2003
- Louay Chanko – Djurgården 2002
- Matias Concha – Djurgården 2005
- Aziz Corr Nyang – Djurgården 2002, 2003
- Claes Cronqvist – Djurgården 1966

=== D ===
- Gösta Dahlberg – Djurgården 1912
- Mikael Dorsin – Djurgården 2002, 2003

=== E ===
- Birger Eklund – Djurgården 1954–55, 1959
- Johan Elmander – Djurgården 2003
- David Englund – Djurgården 1917
- John Eriksson – Djurgården 1954–55, 1959
- Leif Eriksson – Djurgården 1964, 1966
- Patrik Eriksson-Ohlsson – Djurgården 2002, 2003

=== F ===
- Carl Fagerberg – Djurgården 1920
- Henry Fredberg – Djurgården 1917
- Götrik Frykman – Djurgården 1912, 1915
- Torsten Furukrantz – Djurgården 1964

=== G ===
- Conny Granqvist – Djurgården 1966
- Willy Gummesson – Djurgården 1966
- Karl Gustafsson – Djurgården 1917, 1920
- Stig Gustafsson – Djurgården 1959

=== H ===
- Jesper Håkansson – Djurgården 2005
- Olle Hellström – Djurgården 1959, 1964
- Einar Hemming – Djurgården 1917, 1920
- Richard Henriksson – Djurgården 2002, 2003
- Tobias Hysén – Djurgården 2005

=== I ===
- Andreas Isaksson – Djurgården 2002, 2003

=== J ===
- Victor Jansson – Djurgården 1912, 1915
- Markus Johannesson – Djurgården 2005
- Valdemar Johannison – Djurgården 1912
- Andreas Johansson – Djurgården 2002, 2003
- Boris Johansson – Djurgården 1964
- Gottfrid Johansson – Djurgården 1915, 1917, 1920
- Melcher Johansson-Säwensten – Djurgården 1915, 1917
- Mattias Jonson – Djurgården 2005

=== K ===
- Kim Källström – Djurgården 2002, 2003
- Gösta Karlsson – Djurgården 1912
- Hans Karlsson – Djurgården 1959, 1964
- Inge Karlsson – Djurgården 1966
- Jan Karlsson – Djurgården 1964
- Markus Karlsson – Djurgården 2002, 2003
- Karl Karlstrand – Djurgården 1915, 1920
- Toni Kuivasto – Djurgården 2003, 2005
- Jones Kusi-Asare – Djurgården 2005

=== L ===
- Søren Larsen – Djurgården 2005
- Sven Lindman – Djurgården 1966

=== M ===
- Feliciano Magro – Djurgården 2005
- René Makondele – Djurgården 2002, 2003
- Christer Mattiasson – Djurgården 2002, 2003
- Hans Mild – Djurgården 1959, 1964

=== N ===
- Hans Nilsson – Djurgården 1964
- Siyabonga Nomvethe – Djurgården 2005
- Bertil Nordenskjöld – Djurgården 1912, 1915, 1917, 1920

=== O ===
- Jan Öhman – Djurgården 1966
- Nils Öhman – Djurgården 1912
- Albert Öijermark – Djurgården 1920
- Åke Olsson – Djurgården 1954–55
- Einar Olsson – Djurgården 1912, 1915, 1917
- Rune Othberg – Djurgården 1954–55
- Sölvi Ottesen – Djurgården 2005

=== P ===
- Sigge Parling – Djurgården 1954–55, 1959
- Magnus Pehrsson – Djurgården 2002
- Peder Persson – Djurgården 1964, 1966
- Ingvar Petersson – Djurgården 1954–55
- Ronney Pettersson – Djurgården 1966

=== R ===
- Niclas Rasck – Djurgården 2002, 2003, 2005
- Stefan Rehn – Djurgården 2002
- Frithiof Rudén – Djurgården 1917, 1920
- Karl Runn – Djurgården 1915

=== S ===
- Gösta Sandberg – Djurgården 1954–55, 1959, 1964, 1966
- Lars-Olof Sandberg – Djurgården 1964
- Karl Schlaaf – Djurgården 1915
- Ulf Schramm – Djurgården 1964
- Rami Shaaban – Djurgården 2002
- Jan-Erik Sjöberg – Djurgården 1966
- Daniel Sjölund – Djurgården 2003, 2005
- Leif Skiöld – Djurgården 1964
- Jean Söderberg – Djurgården 1912
- Sten Söderberg – Djurgården 1915, 1917, 1920
- Richard Spong – Djurgården 2003
- Babis Stefanidis – Djurgården 2002, 2003
- Fredrik Stenman – Djurgården 2003, 2005
- Elias Storm – Djurgården 2002, 2003, 2005
- Harry Sundberg – Djurgården 1920

=== T ===
- Pa Dembo Touray – Djurgården 2003, 2005
- Sven Tumba – Djurgården 1959

=== W ===
- Oskar Wahlström – Djurgården 2005
- Johan Wallinder – Djurgården 2002
- Ragnar Wicksell – Djurgården 1912, 1915, 1917, 1920
- Kay Wiestål – Djurgården 1966
- Samuel Wowoah – Djurgården 2002, 2003

=== Z ===
- Pagguy Zunda – Djurgården 2002

== See also ==
- List of Swedish football champions
- List of Swedish women's football champions (players)
- List of Swedish junior champions
