= 1967 Djurgårdens IF season =

Djurgården
1967 season
- Manager: Gösta Sandberg
- Stadium: Råsunda Stadium
- Allsvenskan: 2nd
- Svenska Cupen: 4th round
- European Cup: 1st round
- Top goalscorer: League: Kay Wieståhl (9); All: Kay Wieståhl (10)
- Highest home attendance: 44,130 (25 May vs AIK, Allsvenskan)
- Lowest home attendance: 1,364 (4 October vs Górnik Zabrze, European Cup)
- Average home league attendance: 9,728

The 1967 season was Djurgårdens IF's 67th in existence, their 22nd season in Allsvenskan and their fifth consecutive season in the league. They were competing in Allsvenskan, Svenska Cupen and European Cup.

== Player statistics ==
Appearances for competitive matches only.

No.	Pos	Nat	Player	Total		Allsvenskan		Svenska Cupen		European Cup	
No.	Pos	Nat	Player	Apps	Goals	Apps	Goals	Apps	Goals	Apps	Goals
		(Sweden) SWE	Stig Åkerström	3	0	3	0	0	0	0	0
		(Sweden) SWE	Tomas Åström	1	0	0	0	1	0	0	0
		(Sweden) SWE	Dan Brzokoupil	3	0	3	0	0	0	0	0
		(Sweden) SWE	Claes Cronqvist	20	6	18	6	0	0	2	0
		(Sweden) SWE	Per-Anders Eklund	7	3	6	3	0	0	1	0
		(Sweden) SWE	Rolf Fransson	13	0	13	0	0	0	0	0
		(Sweden) SWE	Conny Granqvist	17	1	15	1	2	0	0	0
		(Sweden) SWE	Willy Gummesson	26	3	22	2	2	1	2	0
		(Sweden) SWE	Sten-Olof Hoflin	3	2	3	2	0	0	0	0
		(Sweden) SWE	Björn Jonsson	23	0	19	0	2	0	2	0
		(Sweden) SWE	Inge Karlsson	24	0	20	0	2	0	2	0
		(Sweden) SWE	Mats Karlsson	13	0	9	0	2	0	2	0
		(Sweden) SWE	Sven Lindman	26	6	22	6	2	0	2	0
		(Sweden) SWE	Roland Magnusson	9	1	7	1	0	0	2	0
		(Sweden) SWE	Bo Nilsson	1	0	1	0	0	0	0	0
		(Sweden) SWE	Jan Öhman	7	0	5	0	2	0	0	0
		(Sweden) SWE	Peder Persson	16	5	13	3	2	2	1	0
		(Sweden) SWE	Ronney Pettersson	26	0	22	0	2	0	2	0
		(Sweden) SWE	Jan-Erik Sjöberg	14	2	12	2	2	0	0	0
		(Sweden) SWE	Jan Svensson	26	4	22	4	2	0	2	0
		(Sweden) SWE	Kay Wieståhl	22	10	19	9	1	1	2	0

=== Goals ===
==== Total ====
Name	Goals
(Sweden) Kay Wieståhl	10
(Sweden) Claes Cronqvist	6
(Sweden) Sven Lindman	6
(Sweden) Peder Persson	5
(Sweden) Jan Svensson	4
(Sweden) Per-Anders Eklund	3
(Sweden) Willy Gummesson	3
(Sweden) Sten-Olof Hoflin	2
(Sweden) Jan-Erik Sjöberg	2
(Sweden) Conny Granqvist	1
(Sweden) Roland Magnusson	1

==== Allsvenskan ====
Name	Goals
(Sweden) Kay Wieståhl	9
(Sweden) Claes Cronqvist	6
(Sweden) Sven Lindman	6
(Sweden) Jan Svensson	4
(Sweden) Per-Anders Eklund	3
(Sweden) Peder Persson	3
(Sweden) Willy Gummesson	2
(Sweden) Sten-Olof Hoflin	2
(Sweden) Jan-Erik Sjöberg	2
(Sweden) Conny Granqvist	1
(Sweden) Roland Magnusson	1

==== Svenska Cupen ====
Name	Goals
(Sweden) Peder Persson	2
(Sweden) Willy Gummesson	1
(Sweden) Kay Wieståhl	1

==== European Cup ====
no goals

== Competitions ==
=== Allsvenskan ===
==== League table ====
Pos	Team	Pld	W	D	L	GF	GA	GD	Pts	Qualification or relegation
1	Malmö FF (C)	22	14	5	3	53	21	+32	33	Qualification to European Cup first round
2	Djurgårdens IF	22	10	8	4	40	28	+12	28	
3	Hälsingborgs IF	22	12	2	8	42	35	+7	26	
4	Örebro SK	22	11	4	7	37	30	+7	26	
5	AIK	22	10	5	7	38	33	+5	25	

Rules for classification: 1) points; 2) goal difference; 3) number of goals scored.
(C) Champions

==== Matches ====
12 April 1967	Djurgårdens IF	2 – 0	Helsingborgs IF	Solna
	Wiestål 8'; Persson 75'	Report		Stadium: Råsunda Stadium; Attendance: 10,853; Referee: Curt Liedberg

20 April 1967	IFK Norrköping	0 – 1	Djurgårdens IF	Norrköping
		Report	Wieståhl 43'	Stadium: Idrottsparken; Attendance: 13,836; Referee: Assar Isaksson

26 April 1967	Djurgårdens IF	0 – 0	Malmö FF	Solna
		Report		Stadium: Råsunda Stadium; Attendance: 12,769; Referee: Bo Nilsson

4 May 1967	IF Elfsborg	1 – 2	Djurgårdens IF	Borås
	Westerberg 59' straff'	Report	Sjöberg 20'; Wiestål 73'	Stadium: Ryavallen; Attendance: 13,133; Referee: Carl-Axel Johansson

9 May 1967	Örgryte IS	0 – 1	Djurgårdens IF	Gothenburg
		Report	Lindman 62'	Stadium: Ullevi; Attendance: 15,463; Referee: Sven Jonsson

21 May 1967	Djurgårdens IF	2 – 2	Örebro SK	Solna
	Granqvist 13'; Gummesson 44'	Report	Nordahl 78', 80'	Stadium: Råsunda Stadium; Attendance: 7,757; Referee: Erik Axelryd

25 May 1967	Djurgårdens IF	1 – 1	AIK	Solna
	Persson 67'	Report	Carlsson 82'	Stadium: Råsunda Stadium; Attendance: 44,130; Referee: Curt Nystrand

4 June 1967	IFK Göteborg	3 – 3	Djurgårdens IF	Gothenburg
	B. Johansson 9'; N. Johansson 23'; Eriksson 46'	Report	Lindman 2'; Svensson 6'; Cronqvist 10'	Stadium: Ullevi; Attendance: 12,835; Referee: Folke Johansson

15 June 1967	Hammarby IF	2 – 1	Djurgårdens IF	Solna
	Andersson (2)	Report	?	Stadium: Råsunda Stadium; Attendance: 16,639; Referee: Hans Carlsson

21 June 1967	Djurgårdens IF	4 – 2	IFK Holmsund	Solna
	Lindman 21', 49'; Persson 58'; Svensson 86'	Report	Bäckman 24'; Karlsson 73'	Stadium: Råsunda Stadium; Attendance: 4,294; Referee: Bengt Lundell

27 June 1967	Djurgårdens IF	2 – 0	GAIS	Stockholm
	Cronqvist 1'; Gummesson 29'	Report		Stadium: Stockholm Olympic Stadium; Attendance: 5,545; Referee: Eric Johansson

13 August 1967	GAIS	2 – 1	Djurgårdens IF	Gothenburg
	Wendt 36'; Samuelsson 75' (pen.)	Report	Svensson 74'	Stadium: Ullevi; Attendance: 5,764; Referee: Einar Boström

20 August 1967	Djurgårdens IF	3 – 1	IFK Göteborg	Solna
	Granqvist 11'; Wieståhl 51'; Svensson 56'	Report	Ericsson 8'	Stadium: Råsunda Stadium; Attendance: 3,088; Referee: Sune Modigh

24 August 1967	AIK	0 – 0	Djurgårdens IF	Solna
		Report		Stadium: Råsunda Stadium; Attendance: 23,938; Referee: Curt Liedberg

10 September 1967	Malmö FF	3 – 0	Djurgårdens IF	Malmö
	Ljungberg 9'; Szepanski 17', 24'	Report		Stadium: Malmö Stadion; Attendance: 19,833; Referee: Sven Jonsson

14 September 1967	Djurgårdens IF	1 – 5	IF Elfsborg	Solna
	Cronqvist 65'	Report	Karlsson 19', 78'; Westerberg 28'; Heineman 48' (pen.); Christiansson 86'	Stadium: Råsunda Stadium; Attendance: 5,235; Referee: Bertil Lööw

26 September 1967	Djurgårdens IF	1 – 1	Örgryte IS	Solna
	Magnusson 79'	Report	Simonsson 49'	Stadium: Råsunda Stadium; Attendance: 4,801; Referee: Lars Sjöling

1 October 1967	Örebro SK	2 – 2	Djurgårdens IF	Örebro
	Andersson 20'; Hindrikes 28'	Report	Wiestål 18'; Cronqvist 81'	Stadium: Eyravallen; Attendance: 5,112; Referee: Bror Lindqvist

8 October 1967	Djurgårdens IF	2 – 1	Hammarby IF	Solna
	Wiestål 4', 77'	Report	Olsson 25'	Stadium: Råsunda Stadium; Attendance: 3,261; Referee: Carl-Axel Johansson

15 October 1967	IFK Holmsund	1 – 7	Djurgårdens IF	Holmsund
	Sjöblom	Report	Hoflin (2); Wiestål (2); Eklund; Cronqvist; Brzokoupil	Stadium: Kamratvallen; Attendance: 507; Referee: Sven Jonsson

22 October 1967	Djurgårdens IF	0 – 0	IFK Norrköping	Solna
		Report		Stadium: Råsunda Stadium; Attendance: 5,297; Referee: Bo Nilsson

29 October 1967	Helsingborgs IF	1 – 4	Djurgårdens IF	Helsingborg
	Friberg 83'	Report	o.g. 13'; Eklund 25'; Lindman 69', 69'	Stadium: Olympia; Attendance: 10,102; Referee: Curt Nystrand

=== Svenska Cupen ===
27 July 1967 Third round	IFK Luleå	1 – 4	Djurgårdens IF
	?		Persson (2); Wieståhl; Gummeson	Attendance: 3,917; Referee: Gunnar Fridh

16 August 1967 Fourth round	Djurgårdens IF	0 – 2	GAIS
				Attendance: 1,835; Referee: Folke Johansson

=== European Cup ===
==== First round ====
20 September 1967 1st leg	Górnik Zabrze	3 – 0	Djurgårdens IF	Chorzów
	Lubański 41', 86'; Lentner 88'	Report		Stadium: Silesian Stadium; Attendance: 35,665; Referee: Rudolf Glöckner (East Germany)

4 October 1967 2nd leg	Djurgårdens IF	0 – 1	Górnik Zabrze	Stockholm
		Report	Musiałek 35'	Stadium: Stockholm Olympic Stadium; Attendance: 1,364; Referee: Tage Sørensen (Denmark)
