= 1969 Djurgårdens IF season =

Djurgården
1969 season
- Manager: Gösta Sandberg
- Stadium: Råsunda Stadium
- Allsvenskan: 3rd
- Svenska Cupen: Quarter-finals
- Top goalscorer: League: Claes Cronqvist (11); All: Claes Cronqvist (12)
- Highest home attendance: 20,520 (4 June vs AIK, Allsvenskan)
- Lowest home attendance: 3,816 (7 April vs AIK, Svenska Cupen)
- Average home league attendance: 9,690

The 1969 season was Djurgårdens IF's 69th in existence, their 24th season in Allsvenskan and their 7th consecutive season in the league. They were competing in Allsvenskan, 1968–69 Svenska Cupen and 1969–70 Svenska Cupen.

== Player statistics ==
Appearances for competitive matches only.

No.	Pos	Nat	Player	Total		Allsvenskan		1968–69 Svenska Cupen 1969–70 Svenska Cupen	
No.	Pos	Nat	Player	Apps	Goals	Apps	Goals	Apps	Goals
		(Sweden) SWE	Stig Åkerström	24	3	21	3	3	0
		(Sweden) SWE	Dan Brzokoupil	23	11	20	10	3	1
		(Sweden) SWE	Lars Carlsson	7	0	4	0	3	0
		(Sweden) SWE	Leif Claesson	3	0	2	0	1	0
		(Sweden) SWE	Claes Cronqvist	25	12	22	11	3	1
		(Sweden) SWE	Conny Granqvist	25	4	22	4	3	0
		(Sweden) SWE	Willy Gummesson	25	0	22	0	3	0
		(Sweden) SWE	Sten-Olof Hoflin	1	0	1	0	0	0
		(Sweden) SWE	Hans Jonsson	6	0	6	0	0	0
		(Sweden) SWE	Björn Jonsson	24	0	21	0	3	0
		(Sweden) SWE	Inge Karlsson	25	0	22	0	3	0
		(Sweden) SWE	Sven Lindman	11	2	11	2	0	0
		(Sweden) SWE	Hans Nilsson	21	5	20	5	1	0
		(Sweden) SWE	Björn Persson	7	0	7	0	0	0
		(Sweden) SWE	Ronney Pettersson	25	0	22	0	3	0
		(Sweden) SWE	Ingvar Sandberg	5	0	4	0	1	0
		(Sweden) SWE	Jan-Erik Sjöberg	21	1	18	1	3	0
		(Sweden) SWE	Jan Svensson	22	4	20	3	2	1

=== Goals ===
==== Total ====
Name	Goals
(Sweden) Claes Cronqvist	12
(Sweden) Dan Brzokoupil	11
(Sweden) Hans Nilsson	5
(Sweden) Conny Granqvist	4
(Sweden) Jan Svensson	4
(Sweden) Stig Åkerström	3
(Sweden) Sven Lindman	2
(Sweden) Jan-Erik Sjöberg	1

==== Allsvenskan ====
Name	Goals
(Sweden) Claes Cronqvist	11
(Sweden) Dan Brzokoupil	10
(Sweden) Hans Nilsson	5
(Sweden) Conny Granqvist	4
(Sweden) Stig Åkerström	3
(Sweden) Jan Svensson	3
(Sweden) Sven Lindman	2
(Sweden) Jan-Erik Sjöberg	1

==== Svenska Cupen ====
Name	Goals
(Sweden) Dan Brzokoupil	1
(Sweden) Claes Cronqvist	1
(Sweden) Jan Svensson	1

== Competitions ==
=== Allsvenskan ===
==== League table ====
Pos	Team	Pld	W	D	L	GF	GA	GD	Pts	Qualification or relegation
1	IFK Göteborg (C)	22	13	5	4	38	19	+19	31	Qualification to European Cup first round
2	Malmö FF	22	11	6	5	34	27	+7	28	
3	Djurgårdens IF	22	12	3	7	39	26	+13	27	
4	Åtvidabergs FF	22	11	4	7	38	34	+4	26	Qualification to Cup Winners' Cup preliminary round (Note: Åtvidaberg qualified for the European Cup Winners' Cup as Svenska Cupen champions 1969–70.)
5	Örebro SK	22	10	5	7	33	27	+6	25	

Rules for classification: 1) points; 2) goal difference; 3) number of goals scored.
(C) Champions

==== Matches ====
13 April 1969	Östers IF	1 – 0	Djurgårdens IF	Växjö
	Bild 21'	Report		Stadium: Värendsvallen; Attendance: 9,446; Referee: Rolf Arnshed

20 April 1969	Djurgårdens IF	0 – 4	IFK Göteborg	Solna
		Report	Eklund 35', 45'; Almqvist 64', 90'	Stadium: Råsunda Stadium; Attendance: 4,384; Referee: Folke Frankenberg

27 April 1969	Åtvidabergs FF	3 – 2	Djurgårdens IF	Åtvidaberg
	Wallinder 6'; Eklund 24'; Franzén 48'	Report	Cronqvist 33'; Brzokoupil 58'	Stadium: Kopparvallen; Attendance: 3,984; Referee: Lars Sjöling

4 May 1969	Djurgårdens IF	4 – 1	IF Elfsborg	Solna
	Cronqvist 17'; Granqvist 63'; Brzokoupil 75'; Svensson 80'	Report	Söderberg 35'	Stadium: Råsunda Stadium; Attendance: 6,968; Referee: Sven Johansson

11 May 1969	Djurgårdens IF	6 – 0	GAIS	Stockholm
	Nilsson 8', 41' (pen.); Granqvist 38', 89'; Brzokoupil 43', 53'	Report		Stadium: Stockholm Olympic Stadium; Attendance: 4,837; Referee: Hans Carlsson

15 May 1969	IK Sirius	0 – 1	Djurgårdens IF	Uppsala
			Åkerström 90'	Stadium: Studenternas IP; Attendance: 9,170; Referee: Bertil Lööw

26 May 1969	Djurgårdens IF	3 – 0	Jönköpings Södra IF	Stockholm
	Brzokoupil 1', 68'; Cronqvist 71'			Stadium: Stockholm Olympic Stadium; Attendance: 6,604; Referee: Gunnar Fridh

29 May 1969	Örebro SK	1 – 0	Djurgårdens IF	Örebro
	Eriksson 15'			Stadium: Eyravallen; Attendance: 5,941; Referee: Curt Liedberg

4 June 1969	Djurgårdens IF	2 – 0	AIK	Solna
	Brzokoupil 84'; Sjöberg 86'			Stadium: Råsunda Stadium; Attendance: 20,520; Referee: Erik Axelryd

8 June 1969	IFK Norrköping	3 – 0	Djurgårdens IF	Norrköping
	Larsson 43'; Jonsson 62', 75'			Stadium: Idrottsparken; Attendance: 8,389; Referee: Curt Nystrandh

12 June 1969	Malmö FF	1 – 2	Djurgårdens IF	Malmö
	Szepanski 8'		Brzokoupil 2'; Cronqvist 30'	Stadium: Malmö Stadion; Attendance: 12,310; Referee: Sven Jonsson

14 August 1969	Djurgårdens IF	1 – 1	Malmö FF	Solna
	Lindman 47'		Larsson 4'	Stadium: Råsunda Stadium; Attendance: 14,873; Referee: Bo Nilsson

21 August 1969	IFK Göteborg	0 – 0	Djurgårdens IF	Gothenburg
				Stadium: Ullevi; Attendance: Sune Modigh; Referee: 12,349

28 August 1969	Djurgårdens IF	2 – 4	Östers IF	Solna
	Granqvist 43'; Åkerström 84'		Svensson 2'; Ejderstedt 31'; Ljunggren 82', 90'	Stadium: Råsunda Stadium; Attendance: 11,115; Referee: Bertil Andersson

2 September 1969	AIK	0 – 1	Djurgårdens IF	Solna
			Åkerström 57'	Stadium: Råsunda Stadium; Attendance: 22,573; Referee: Hans Carlsson

7 September 1969	Djurgårdens IF	3 – 1	IFK Norrköping	Solna
	Svensson 36'; Brzokoupil 38'; Lindman 80'		Hesselgren 75'	Stadium: Råsunda Stadium; Attendance: 10,929; Referee: Folke Johansson

14 September 1969	Jönköpings Södra IF	1 – 4	Djurgårdens IF	Jönköping
	Lantz 15'		Cronqvist 20', 89'; Nilsson 70' (pen.); Svensson 76'	Stadium: Stadsparksvallen; Attendance: 11,092; Referee: Einar Boström

21 September 1969	Djurgårdens IF	1 – 2	Örebro SK	Stockholm
	Nilsson 59' (pen.)		Hindrikes 24'; Eriksson 32'	Stadium: Stockholm Olympic Stadium; Attendance: 8,328; Referee: Ove Dahlberg

28 September 1969	GAIS	2 – 3	Djurgårdens IF	Gothenburg
	o.g. 12'; Bloom 68'		Cronqvist 17', 42'; Nilsson 89' (pen.)	Stadium: Ullevi; Attendance: 5,593; Referee: Bo Nilsson

5 October 1969	Djurgårdens IF	0 – 0	IK Sirius	Solna
				Stadium: Råsunda Stadium; Attendance: 12,574; Referee: Curt Nystrandh

18 October 1969	Djurgårdens IF	2 – 1	Åtvidabergs FF	Stockholm
	Cronqvist 14', 51'		Eklund §6'	Stadium: Stockholm Olympic Stadium; Attendance: 5,454; Referee: Bertil Lööw

25 October 1969	IF Elfsborg	0 – 2	Djurgårdens IF	Borås
			Cronqvist 10'; Brzokoupil 49'	Stadium: Ryavallen; Attendance: 5,282; Referee: Sven Jonsson

=== Svenska Cupen ===
==== 1968–69 Svenska Cupen ====
7 April 1969 Quarter-finals	Djurgårdens IF	1 – 1 (a.e.t.)	AIK
	Cronqvist 30'		Andersson 88'	Attendance: 3,816; Referee: Sven Jonsson

23 April 1969 Quarter-finals replay	AIK	1 – 0	Djurgårdens IF
	Lundblad 44'			Attendance: 2,562; Referee: Bosse Nilsson

==== 1969–70 Svenska Cupen ====
23 July 1969 Fourth round	IFK Malmö	4 – 2 (a.e.t.)	Djurgårdens IF
	Andersson 11', 91'; Steen-Olsen 43'; Lindau 112'		Svensson 19'; Brzokoupil 31'	Attendance: 3,846; Referee: Bertil Lööw
