= 1966 Djurgårdens IF season =

Djurgården
1966 season
- Manager: Torsten Lindberg
- Stadium: Råsunda Stadium
- Allsvenskan: Winner
- 1966–67 Inter-Cities Fairs Cup: 1st round
- Top goalscorer: League: Sven Lindman (12); All: Sven Lindman & Peder Persson (12)
- Highest home attendance: 39,772 (30 October vs IFK Norrköping, Allsvenskan)
- Lowest home attendance: 1,580 (21 September vs 1. FC Lokomotive Leipzig, Inter-Cities Fairs Cup)
- Average home league attendance: 11,539

The 1966 season was Djurgårdens IF's 66th in existence, their 21st season in Allsvenskan and their 4th consecutive season in the league. They were competing in Allsvenskan and 1966–67 Inter-Cities Fairs Cup.

== Player statistics ==
Appearances for competitive matches only.

No.	Pos	Nat	Player	Total		Allsvenskan		Inter-Cities Fairs Cup	
No.	Pos	Nat	Player	Apps	Goals	Apps	Goals	Apps	Goals
		(Sweden) SWE	Claes Cronqvist	23	2	21	2	2	0
		(Sweden) SWE	Leif Eriksson	12	3	12	3	0	0
		(Sweden) SWE	Rolf Fransson	5	0	4	0	1	0
		(Sweden) SWE	Conny Granqvist	13	3	11	3	2	0
		(Sweden) SWE	Willy Gummesson	24	0	22	0	2	0
		(Sweden) SWE	Björn Jonsson	3	0	3	0	0	0
		(Sweden) SWE	Inge Karlsson	22	0	22	0	0	0
		(Sweden) SWE	Mats Karlsson	7	0	5	0	2	0
		(Sweden) SWE	Sven Lindman	24	12	22	12	2	0
		(Sweden) SWE	Roland Magnusson	3	0	2	0	1	0
		(Sweden) SWE	Hans Nilsson	6	4	6	4	0	0
		(Sweden) SWE	Jan Öhman	23	1	21	1	2	0
		(Sweden) SWE	Ronney Pettersson	24	0	22	0	2	0
		(Sweden) SWE	Peder Persson	20	12	19	11	1	1
		(Sweden) SWE	Gösta Sandberg	21	1	20	1	1	0
		(Sweden) SWE	Jan-Erik Sjöberg	23	4	21	4	2	0
		(Sweden) SWE	Kay Wieståhl	24	6	22	5	2	1

=== Goals ===
==== Total ====
Name	Goals
(Sweden) Sven Lindman	12
(Sweden) Peder Persson	12
(Sweden) Kay Wieståhl	6
(Sweden) Hans Nilsson	4
(Sweden) Jan-Erik Sjöberg	4
(Sweden) Leif Eriksson	3
(Sweden) Conny Granqvist	3
(Sweden) Claes Cronqvist	2
(Sweden) Jan Öhman	1
(Sweden) Gösta Sandberg	1

==== Allsvenskan ====
Name	Goals
(Sweden) Sven Lindman	12
(Sweden) Peder Persson	11
(Sweden) Kay Wieståhl	5
(Sweden) Hans Nilsson	4
(Sweden) Jan-Erik Sjöberg	4
(Sweden) Leif Eriksson	3
(Sweden) Conny Granqvist	3
(Sweden) Claes Cronqvist	2
(Sweden) Jan Öhman	1
(Sweden) Gösta Sandberg	1

==== Inter-Cities Fairs Cup ====
Name	Goals
(Sweden) Peder Persson	1
(Sweden) Kay Wieståhl	1

== Competitions ==
=== Allsvenskan ===
==== League table ====
Pos	Team	Pld	W	D	L	GF	GA	GD	Pts	Qualification or relegation
1	Djurgårdens IF (C)	22	15	3	4	46	17	+29	33	Qualification to European Cup first round
2	IFK Norrköping	22	12	5	5	53	24	+29	29	
3	IF Elfsborg	22	11	7	4	40	26	+14	29	
4	IFK Göteborg	22	12	5	5	44	34	+10	29	
5	AIK	22	12	3	7	36	26	+10	27	

Rules for classification: 1) points; 2) goal difference; 3) number of goals scored.
(C) Champions

==== Matches ====
24 April 1966	Örgryte IS	1 – 3	Djurgårdens IF	Gothenburg
	Simonsson 24'	Report	Nilsson 11', 40'; Sjöberg 31'	Stadium: Gamla Ullevi; Attendance: 6,930; Referee: Lars Sjöling

1 May 1966	Djurgårdens IF	2 – 0	IFK Göteborg	Solna
	Sjöberg 40'; Öhman 83'	Report		Stadium: Råsunda Stadium; Attendance: 9,306; Referee: Sune Modigh

5 May 1966	IFK Norrköping	3 – 0	Djurgårdens IF	Norrköping
	Berglund 6'; Kindvall 64', 89'	Report		Stadium: Idrottsparken; Attendance: 9,543; Referee: Eric Johansson

15 May 1966	Degerfors IF	1 – 3	Djurgårdens IF	Degerfors
	Aronsson 56'	Report	Persson 44', 77'; Eriksson 65'	Stadium: Stora Valla; Attendance: 3,244; Referee: Roland Bäckström

25 May 1966	Djurgårdens IF	1 – 0	AIK	Solna
	Nilsson 50'	Report		Stadium: Råsunda Stadium; Attendance: 24,735; Referee: Bo Nilsson

1 June 1966	Djurgårdens IF	3 – 0	Örebro SK	Solna
	Nilsson 23' (pen.); Eriksson 62'; Lindman 80'	Report		Stadium: Råsunda Stadium; Attendance: 6,200; Referee: Folke Johansson

7 June 1966	GAIS	0 – 0	Djurgårdens IF	Gothenburg
		Report		Stadium: Ullevi; Attendance: 11,881; Referee: Rolf Arnshed

12 June 1966	Hälsingborgs IF	2 – 4	Djurgårdens IF	Helsingborg
	Rubin 37'; Norell 43' (pen.)	Report	Lindman 7', 87'; Persson 64', 77'	Stadium: Olympia; Attendance: 6,973; Referee: Einar Boström

16 June 1966	Djurgårdens IF	4 – 0	IK Brage	Solna
	Persson 49', 56'; Lindman 53'; Cronqvist 82'	Report		Stadium: Råsunda Stadium; Attendance: 6,332; Referee: Carl-Axel Johansson

8 August 1966	Djurgårdens IF	3 – 0	Malmö FF	Stockholm
	Persson 32'; Lindman 43'; Sjöberg 89'	Report		Stadium: Stockholm Olympic Stadium; Attendance: 10,357; Referee: Einar Boström

11 August 1966	Djurgårdens IF	0 – 0	IF Elfsborg	Stockholm
		Report		Stadium: Stockholm Olympic Stadium; Attendance: 10,371; Referee: Hans Carlsson

18 August 1966	IF Elfsborg	2 – 1	Djurgårdens IF	Borås
	Gustavsson 49'; Höglund 74'	Report	Eriksson 77'	Stadium: Ryavallen; Attendance: 13,925; Referee: Henry Storm

21 August 1966	Djurgårdens IF	3 – 0	Örgryte IS	Stockholm
	Lindman 65', 72'; Persson 82'			Stadium: Stockholm Olympic Stadium; Attendance: 6,620; Referee: Ivar Berglund

31 August 1966	Malmö FF	0 – 2	Djurgårdens IF	Malmö
			Granqvist 3'; Lindman 73'	Stadium: Malmö Stadion; Attendance: 6,854; Referee: Gösta Färm

4 September 1966	Örebro SK	1 – 2	Djurgårdens IF	Örebro
	Andersson 44'		Persson 18'; Sjöberg 80'	Stadium: Eyravallen; Attendance: 4,884; Referee: Bertil Lööw

8 September 1966	Djurgårdens IF	1 – 2	GAIS	Solna
	Granqvist 67'		H. Samuelsson 33', 52'	Stadium: Råsunda Stadium

22 September 1966	AIK	1 – 0	Djurgårdens IF	Solna
	Grip 33'	Report		Stadium: Råsunda Stadium; Attendance: 24,051; Referee: Hans Carlsson

2 October 1966	Djurgårdens IF	4 – 0	Degerfors IF	Solna
	Wieståhl 33', 64'; Lindman 47'; Cronqvist 77'			Stadium: Råsunda Stadium; Attendance: 3,243; Referee: Lennart Nylén

9 October 1966	IK Brage	0 – 1	Djurgårdens IF	Borlänge
			Persson 75'	Stadium: Domnarvsvallen; Attendance: 2,706; Referee: Einar Boström

16 October 1966	Djurgårdens IF	2 – 0	Hälsingborgs IF	Solna
	Wieståhl 63'; Granqvist 82'			Stadium: Råsunda Stadium; Attendance: 4,266; Referee: Bengt Lundell

20 October 1966	IFK Göteborg	4 – 4	Djurgårdens IF	Gothenburg
	Claesson 4', 8', 66'; Johansson 70' (pen.)		Sandberg 25'; Wieståhl 28'; Lindman 84', 88'	Stadium: Ullevi; Attendance: 17,686; Referee: Curt Liedberg

30 October 1966	Djurgårdens IF	3 – 0	IFK Norrköping	Solna
	Lindman 43'; Wieståhl 86'; Persson 89'			Stadium: Råsunda Stadium; Attendance: 39,772; Referee: Bertil Lööw

=== Inter-Cities Fairs Cup ===
==== First round ====
24 August 1966 1st leg	Djurgårdens IF	1 – 3	1. FC Lokomotive Leipzig	Stockholm
	Persson 60'		Frenzell 45'; Löwe 53'; Berger 63'	Stadium: Stockholm Olympic Stadium; Attendance: 1,580; Referee: Hans Granlund (Norway)

27 September 1966 2nd leg	1. FC Lokomotive Leipzig	2 – 1	Djurgårdens IF	Leipzig
	Trölitzsch 24'; Karlsson 68' (o.g.)		Wieståhl 69'	Stadium: Zentralstadion; Attendance: 6,158; Referee: Jef Dorpmans (Netherlands)
