= 1964 Djurgårdens IF season =

Djurgården
1964 season
- Manager: Torsten Lindberg
- Stadium: Råsunda Stadium; Stockholm Olympic Stadium
- Allsvenskan: Winner
- 1964–65 Inter-Cities Fairs Cup: 1st round
- Top goalscorer: League: Hans Nilsson (15); All: Hans Nilsson (15)
- Highest home attendance: 25,718 (26 August vs AIK, Allsvenskan)
- Lowest home attendance: 4,924 (14 June vs GAIS, Allsvenskan)
- Average home league attendance: 12,753

The 1964 season was Djurgårdens IF's 64th in existence, their 20th season in Allsvenskan and their fourth consecutive season in the league. They were competing in Allsvenskan and 1964–65 Inter-Cities Fairs Cup.

== Player statistics ==
Appearances for competitive matches only.

No.	Pos	Nat	Player	Total		Allsvenskan	
No.	Pos	Nat	Player	Apps	Goals	Apps	Goals
		(Sweden) SWE	Bernt Andersson	9	3	9	3
	GK	(Sweden) SWE	Arne Arvidsson	22	0	22	0
		(Sweden) SWE	Lars Arnesson	12	0	12	0
		(Sweden) SWE	Leif Eriksson	22	11	22	11
		(Sweden) SWE	Torsten Furukrantz	21	0	21	0
		(Sweden) SWE	Olle Hellström	17	0	17	0
		(Sweden) SWE	Boris Johansson	19	5	19	5
		(Sweden) SWE	Hans Karlsson	10	4	10	4
		(Sweden) SWE	Jan Karlsson	19	0	19	0
		(Sweden) SWE	Hans Mild	22	0	22	0
		(Sweden) SWE	Hans Nilsson	22	15	22	15
		(Sweden) SWE	Peder Persson	17	5	17	5
		(Sweden) SWE	Gösta Sandberg	19	1	19	1
		(Sweden) SWE	Lars-Olof Sandberg	4	1	4	1
		(Sweden) SWE	Ulf Schramm	1	0	1	0
		(Sweden) SWE	Leif Skiöld	4	1	4	1

=== Goals ===
==== Total ====
Name	Goals
(Sweden) Hans Nilsson	15
(Sweden) Leif Eriksson	11
(Sweden) Boris Johansson	5
(Sweden) Peder Persson	5
(Sweden) Hans Karlsson	4
(Sweden) Bernt Andersson	3
(Sweden) Gösta Sandberg	1
(Sweden) Lars-Olof Sandberg	1
(Sweden) Leif Skiöld	1

== Competitions ==
=== Allsvenskan ===
==== League table ====
Pos	Team	Pld	W	D	L	GF	GA	GD	Pts	Qualification or relegation
1	Djurgårdens IF (C)	22	13	5	4	46	20	+26	31	Qualification to 1965–66 European Cup preliminary round (Note: Djurgården qualified for the 1965–66 European Cup as Allsvenskan champions of 1964.)
2	Malmö FF	22	13	5	4	45	20	+25	31	Qualification to 1964–65 European Cup preliminary round (Note: Malmö FF qualified for the 1964–65 European Cup as Allsvenskan leaders in the spring of 1964.)
3	Örgryte IS	22	14	3	5	54	36	+18	31	
4	IFK Norrköping	22	11	6	5	55	28	+27	28	
5	IF Elfsborg	22	12	2	8	42	32	+10	26	

Rules for classification: 1) points; 2) goal difference; 3) number of goals scored.
(C) Champions
