= 1954–55 Djurgårdens IF season =

Djurgården
1954–55 season
- Manager: Frank Soo
- Stadium: Råsunda Stadium
- Allsvenskan: Winner
- Top goalscorer: League: John Eriksson (19); All: John Eriksson (19)
- Highest home attendance: 39,696 (26 May vs AIK, Allsvenskan)
- Lowest home attendance: 5,754 (25 September vs Sandvikens IF, Allsvenskan)
- Average home league attendance: 19,010

The 1954–55 season was Djurgårdens IF's 55th in existence, their 11th season in Allsvenskan and their sixth consecutive season in the league. They were competing in Allsvenskan.

== Player statistics ==
Appearances for competitive matches only.

No.	Pos	Nat	Player	Total		Allsvenskan	
No.	Pos	Nat	Player	Apps	Goals	Apps	Goals
		(Sweden) SWE	Bernt Andersson	19	4	19	4
		(Sweden) SWE	Karl-Erik Andersson	22	2	22	2
		(Sweden) SWE	Hans Andersson-Tvilling	19	5	19	5
	GK	(Sweden) SWE	Arne Arvidsson	21	0	21	0
		(Sweden) SWE	Bernt Brick	2	0	2	0
		(Sweden) SWE	Birger Eklund	22	7	22	7
		(Sweden) SWE	John Eriksson	17	19	17	19
		(Sweden) SWE	Bo Finnhammar	6	2	6	2
		(Sweden) SWE	Stig Gustafsson	3	0	3	0
		(Sweden) SWE	Arne Larsson	12	0	12	0
	GK	(Sweden) SWE	Sven Lindberg	1	0	1	0
		(Sweden) SWE	Hans Mild	3	1	3	1
		(Sweden) SWE	Åke Olsson	21	0	21	0
		(Sweden) SWE	Rune Othberg	10	0	10	0
		(Sweden) SWE	Sigge Parling	22	0	22	0
		(Sweden) SWE	Ingvar Petersson	16	0	16	0
		(Sweden) SWE	Gösta Sandberg	22	13	22	13
		(Sweden) SWE	Birger Stenman	4	0	4	0

=== Goals ===
==== Total ====
Name	Goals
(Sweden) John Eriksson	19
(Sweden) Gösta Sandberg	13
(Sweden) Birger Eklund	7
(Sweden) Hans Andersson-Tvilling	5
(Sweden) Bernt Andersson	4
(Sweden) Karl-Erik Andersson	2
(Sweden) Bo Finnhammar	2
(Sweden) Hans Mild	1

== Competitions ==
=== Allsvenskan ===
==== League table ====
Pos	Team	Pld	W	D	L	GF	GA	GD	Pts	Qualification or relegation
1	Djurgårdens IF (C)	22	14	5	3	53	27	+26	33	Qualification for the European Cup first round
2	Halmstads BK	22	12	5	5	49	27	+22	29	
3	AIK	22	11	6	5	51	30	+21	28	
4	IFK Norrköping	22	8	8	6	37	29	+8	24	
5	Hälsingborgs IF	22	9	5	8	42	31	+11	23	

Rules for classification: 1) points; 2) goal difference; 3) number of goals scored.
(C) Champions
