= 1961 Djurgårdens IF season =

Djurgården
1961 season
- Chairman: Sigge Bergh
- Manager: Walter Probst
- Stadium: Stockholm Olympic Stadium
- Division 2 Svealand: Winners
- Top goalscorer: League: Leif Skiöld (27); All: Leif Skiöld (30)
- Highest home attendance: 28,294 (7 October vs GIF Sundsvall, Allsvenskan promotion play-offs)
- Lowest home attendance: 861 (vs IK City, Division 2 Svealand)
- Average home league attendance: 3,998

The 1961 season was Djurgårdens IF's 61st in existence, their 18th season in Division 2 and their 1st consecutive season in the league. They were competing in Division 2 Svealand and its play-off for the 1962 Allsvenskan.

== Player statistics ==
Appearances for competitive matches only.

No.	Pos	Nat	Player	Total		Division 2 Svealand		Allsvenskan promotion play-offs	
No.	Pos	Nat	Player	Apps	Goals	Apps	Goals	Apps	Goals
		(Sweden) SWE	Christer Andersson						
		(Sweden) SWE	Nils Andersson						
		(Sweden) SWE	Lars Arnesson						
		(Sweden) SWE	Arne Arvidsson						
		(Sweden) SWE	Jan Åslund						
		(Sweden) SWE	Lars Broström						
		(Sweden) SWE	Jan Carlsson						
		(Sweden) SWE	Leif Eriksson						
		(Sweden) SWE	Olle Hellström						
		(Sweden) SWE	Hans Johansson						
		(Sweden) SWE	Hans Karlsson						
		(Sweden) SWE	Lars Lundqvist						
		(Sweden) SWE	Hans Mild						
		(Sweden) SWE	Gösta Sandberg						
		(Sweden) SWE	Lars-Olof Sandberg						
		(Sweden) SWE	Ulf Schramm						
		(Sweden) SWE	Sigvard Schwartzmann						
		(Sweden) SWE	Leif Skiöld						
		(Sweden) SWE	Sven Tumba						

=== Goals ===
==== Promotion play-offs ====
Name	Goals
(Sweden) Leif Skiöld	3
(Sweden) Leif Eriksson	2
(Sweden) Hans Mild	1
(Sweden) Gösta Sandberg	1
(Sweden) Lars-Olof Sandberg	1
(Sweden) Ulf Schramm	1
(Sweden) Sven Tumba	1

== Competitions ==
=== Division 2 Svealand ===
==== League table ====
Pos	Team	Pld	W	D	L	GF	GA	GD	Pts	Qualification or relegation
1	Djurgårdens IF	22	17	2	3	77	21	+56	36	Playoffs for promotion to Allsvenskan
2	IFK Stockholm	22	17	2	3	65	18	+47	36	
3	Sundbybergs IK	22	13	3	6	63	41	+22	29	
4	Karlstads BIK	22	12	1	9	40	42	−2	25	
5	IFK Eskilstuna	22	11	2	9	52	48	+4	24	

=== Allsvenskan promotion play-offs ===
==== League table ====
Pos	Team	Pld	W	D	L	GF	GA	GD	Pts	Promotion
1	Djurgårdens IF (C)	3	3	0	0	10	4	+6	6	Promotion to Allsvenskan
2	Högadal	3	2	0	1	12	7	+5	4	Promotion to Allsvenskan
3	GIF Sundsvall	3	0	1	2	5	9	−4	1	
4	Östers IF	3	0	1	2	2	9	−7	1	

Rules for classification: 1) points; 2) goal difference; 3) number of goals scored.
(C) Champions

==== Matches ====
7 October 1961 Matchday 1	Djurgårdens IF	3–1	GIF Sundsvall	Solna
	L.-O. Sandberg 13' (pen.); Tumba 22'; Eriksson 84'		Nordin 12'	Stadium: Råsunda Stadium; Attendance: 28,294; Referee: Erik Johansson

15 October 1961 Matchday 2	Östers IF	0–2	Djurgårdens IF	Växjö
			G. Sandberg 25'; Skiöld 44'	Stadium: Värendsvallen; Attendance: 17,036; Referee: Einar Boström

21 October 1961 Matchday 3	Djurgårdens IF	5–3	Högadals IS	Nässjö
	Skiöld 34', 80'; Schramm 40'; Mild 42'; Eriksson 48'		Lindqvist 27'; Ingvarsson 50'; Jönsson 60'	Attendance: 2,495; Referee: Roland Bäckström

=== Nordic Cup ===
The tournament continued from the 1960 season and continued into the 1962 season.

==== Semi-finals ====
9 April 1961	IFK Norrköping (Sweden)	0–2	(Sweden) Djurgården	Norrköping
			Skiöld; Karlsson	Stadium: Idrottsparken; Attendance: 4,156
