= 1968 Division 2 (Swedish football) =

Swedish League Division 2
- Season: 1968
- Champions: Sandvikens IF; IK Siruis; Jönköpings Södra IF; Landskrona BoIS
- Promoted: Jönköpings Södra IF; IK Siruis
- Relegated: IF Friska Viljor; Bodens BK; Frösö IF; IF Karlskoga/Bofors; Västerås SK; Åshammars IK; Norrby IF; Alingsås IF; BK Derby; Nybro IF; Gnosjö IF; Åstorps IF

Statistics of Swedish football Division 2 for the 1968 season.

== League standings ==
=== Norrland ===
Pos	Team	Pld	W	D	L	GF	GA	GD	Pts	Qualification or relegation
1	Sandvikens IF	22	17	0	5	56	18	+38	34	Playoffs for promotion to Allsvenskan
2	Sandåkerns SK	22	10	8	4	41	23	+18	28	
3	Ljusdals IF	22	9	9	4	38	20	+18	27	
4	IFK Luleå	22	9	8	5	32	34	−2	26	
5	IFK Holmsund	22	10	4	8	47	28	+19	24	
6	Skellefteå AIK/IF	22	8	5	9	29	24	+5	21	
7	Gimonäs CK	22	8	5	9	30	37	−7	21	
8	Domsjö IF	22	6	8	8	39	37	+2	20	
9	GIF Sundsvall	22	7	5	10	31	43	−12	19	
10	IF Friska Viljor	22	6	5	11	23	42	−19	17	Relegation to Division 3
11	Bodens BK	22	3	8	11	31	64	−33	14	Relegation to Division 3
12	Frösö IF	22	3	7	12	26	53	−27	13	Relegation to Division 3

=== Svealand ===
Pos	Team	Pld	W	D	L	GF	GA	GD	Pts	Qualification or relegation
1	IK Sirius	22	19	1	2	63	17	+46	39	Playoffs for promotion to Allsvenskan
2	Hammarby IF	22	14	3	5	62	22	+40	31	
3	Degerfors IF	22	14	3	5	53	33	+20	31	
4	IFK Eskilstuna	22	14	3	5	41	25	+16	31	
5	IK Brage	22	10	4	8	39	33	+6	24	
6	Brynäs IF	22	8	3	11	42	50	−8	19	
7	Sundbybergs IK	22	6	6	10	29	33	−4	18	
8	Råsunda IS	22	8	2	12	31	56	−25	18	
9	IFK Stockholm	22	6	5	11	29	33	−4	17	
10	IF Karlskoga/Bofors	22	5	5	12	27	40	−13	15	Relegation to Division 3
11	Västerås SK	22	6	3	13	31	48	−17	15	Relegation to Division 3
12	Åshammars IK	22	2	2	18	23	80	−57	6	Relegation to Division 3

=== Norra Götaland ===
Pos	Team	Pld	W	D	L	GF	GA	GD	Pts	Qualification or relegation
1	Jönköping Södra IF	22	14	3	5	39	24	+15	31	Playoffs for promotion to Allsvenskan
2	Skövde AIK	22	11	5	6	48	37	+11	27	
3	Skogens IF	22	8	7	7	49	41	+8	23	
4	IF Saab	22	7	9	6	43	39	+4	23	
5	IK Sleipner	22	8	6	8	38	32	+6	22	
6	Västra Frölunda IF	22	8	6	8	42	37	+5	22	
7	Karlstads BK	22	9	3	10	41	34	+7	21	
8	Tidaholms GIF	22	7	6	9	28	34	−6	20	
9	IFK Arvika	22	8	4	10	40	51	−11	20	
10	Norrby IF	22	6	7	9	35	44	−9	19	Relegation to Division 3
11	Alingsås IF	22	5	8	9	39	47	−8	18	Relegation to Division 3
12	BK Derby	22	5	8	9	21	43	−22	18	Relegation to Division 3

=== Södra Götaland ===
Pos	Team	Pld	W	D	L	GF	GA	GD	Pts	Qualification or relegation
1	Landskrona BoIS	22	14	5	3	51	26	+25	33	Playoffs for promotion to Allsvenskan
2	IFK Trelleborg	22	13	6	3	43	15	+28	32	
3	IFÖ/Bromölla IF	22	14	2	6	51	20	+31	30	
4	Kalmar FF	22	10	7	5	38	33	+5	27	
5	Grimsås IF	22	12	0	10	38	39	−1	24	
6	Sölvesborgs GIF	22	9	5	8	39	36	+3	23	
7	IFK Malmö	22	9	3	10	49	44	+5	21	
8	IS Halmia	22	8	5	9	43	41	+2	21	
9	IFK Värnamo	22	7	3	12	30	39	−9	17	
10	Nybro IF	22	6	4	12	31	60	−29	16	Relegation to Division 3
11	Gnosjö IF	22	4	5	13	26	51	−25	13	Relegation to Division 3
12	Åstorps IF	22	1	5	16	25	60	−35	7	Relegation to Division 3

== Allsvenskan promotion playoffs ==
Pos	Team	Pld	W	D	L	GF	GA	GD	Pts	Promotion
1	Jönköping Södra IF	3	2	1	0	5	3	+2	5	Promotion to Allsvenskan
2	IK Sirius	3	2	0	1	6	3	+3	4	Promotion to Allsvenskan
3	Sandvikens IF	3	1	0	2	1	4	−3	2	
4	Landskrona BoIS	3	0	1	2	1	3	−2	1	
