= Carl Fagerberg =

Carl Fagerberg may refer to:

- Carl Fagerberg (footballer)
- Carl Fagerberg (sculptor)
