= Björn Carlsson =

Björn Carlsson may refer to:

- Björn Carlsson (footballer, born 1942), Swedish footballer
- Björn Carlsson (footballer, born 1954), Swedish footballer
- Björn Carlsson (ice hockey) (born 1961), Swedish ice hockey player
