= Jan Svensson =

Jan Svensson may refer to:

- Harpo (singer) (born 1950), moniker for Swedish singer Jan Svensson
- Jan Svensson (footballer, born 1944), Swedish footballer
- Jan Svensson (footballer, born 1956), Swedish footballer
