= Hans Jonsson =

Hans Jonsson may refer to:

- Hans Jonsson (ice hockey)
- Hans Jonsson (footballer), Swedish footballer
