= 1969 Allsvenskan =

45th season of Allsvenskan

Allsvenskan
- Season: 1969
- Champions: IFK Göteborg
- Relegated: Jönköpings Södra IF; IK Sirius
- European Cup: IFK Göteborg
- Top goalscorer: Reine Almqvist, IFK Göteborg (16)
- Average attendance: 9,773

Statistics of Allsvenskan in season 1969.

== Overview ==
The league was contested by 12 teams, with IFK Göteborg winning the championship.

== League table ==
Pos	Team	Pld	W	D	L	GF	GA	GD	Pts	Qualification or relegation
1	IFK Göteborg (C)	22	13	5	4	38	19	+19	31	Qualification to European Cup first round
2	Malmö FF	22	11	6	5	34	27	+7	28	
3	Djurgårdens IF	22	12	3	7	39	26	+13	27	
4	Åtvidabergs FF	22	11	4	7	38	34	+4	26	Qualification to Cup Winners' Cup preliminary round (Note: Åtvidaberg qualified for the European Cup Winners' Cup as Svenska Cupen champions 1969–70.)
5	Örebro SK	22	10	5	7	33	27	+6	25	
6	Östers IF	22	9	4	9	37	27	+10	22	
7	IFK Norrköping	22	9	4	9	27	33	−6	22	
8	GAIS	22	7	6	9	31	36	−5	20	
9	AIK	22	5	7	10	21	25	−4	17	
10	IF Elfsborg	22	6	5	11	21	30	−9	17	
11	Jönköpings Södra IF (R)	22	5	5	12	19	51	−32	15	Relegation to Division 2
12	IK Sirius (R)	22	4	6	12	16	29	−13	14	Relegation to Division 2

Rules for classification: 1) points; 2) goal difference; 3) number of goals scored.
(C) Champions; (R) Relegated

== Results ==
Home \ Away	AIK	DIF	GAIS	IFE	IFKG	IFKN	IKS	JS	MFF	ÅFF	ÖSK	ÖIF
AIK		0–1	2–2	0–2	1–0	0–1	1–0	0–0	0–0	0–1	2–2	1–2
Djurgårdens IF	2–0		6–0	4–1	0–4	3–1	0–0	3–0	1–1	2–1	1–2	2–4
GAIS	3–2	2–3		0–0	1–1	2–1	1–1	4–0	3–0	2–3	0–1	1–0
IF Elfsborg	1–1	0–2	0–1		2–3	1–0	1–1	1–0	0–1	0–1	3–1	1–1
IFK Göteborg	2–0	0–0	2–0	2–0		1–0	6–3	1–1	3–1	2–3	1–0	1–0
IFK Norrköping	1–1	3–0	2–2	3–1	0–2		0–2	5–3	1–3	4–2	3–0	3–0
IK Sirius	1–4	0–1	0–1	0–1	0–1	0–1		0–1	0–0	2–0	2–0	0–0
Jönköpings Södra	2–1	1–4	2–1	2–1	0–3	1–3	0–3		1–1	1–1	0–1	0–5
Malmö FF	1–1	1–2	2–1	2–2	1–0	3–0	3–0	3–4		2–1	3–2	2–1
Åtvidabergs FF	0–3	3–2	4–2	0–2	1–1	3–2	2–0	0–0	2–0		2–1	5–2
Örebro SK	1–0	1–0	1–1	3–1	1–1	2–2	5–1	4–0	1–2	1–1		2–1
Östers IF	0–1	1–0	3–1	2–0	4–1	1–1	0–0	6–0	1–2	3–2	0–1	

Legend: Blue = home team win; Yellow = draw; Red = away team win.

== Season statistics ==
=== Top scorers ===
Rank	Player	Club	Goals
1	(Sweden) Reine Almqvist	IFK Göteborg	16
2	(Sweden) Tord Ljunggren	Östers IF	14
3	(Sweden) Yngve Hindrikes	Örebro SK	13
4	(Sweden) Staffan Tapper	Malmö FF	12
5	(Sweden) Claes Cronqvist	Djurgårdens IF	11
6	(Sweden) Dan Brzokoupil	Djurgårdens IF	10
6	(Sweden) Ulf Hultberg	IFK Norrköping	10
8	(Sweden) Ove Eklund	Åtvidabergs FF	9

== Attendances ==
No.	Club	Average	Highest
1	IFK Göteborg	18,997	43,130
2	Malmö FF	12,776	24,672
3	GAIS	12,343	39,370
4	Östers IF	11,145	16,868
5	Djurgårdens IF	9,690	20,520
6	AIK	9,510	22,573
7	IK Sirius FK	9,208	12,446
8	IFK Norrköping	8,915	12,410
9	Jönköpings Södra IF	8,582	13,534
10	IF Elfsborg	7,699	10,212
11	Örebro SK	7,595	13,783
12	Åtvidabergs FF	6,294	10,780
