= Mats Aronsson =

Swedish footballer

Personal information
- Full name: Mats Olof Aronsson
- Date of birth: 16 August 1951 (age 75)
- Position: Forward

Senior career*
Years	Team	Apps	(Gls)
- Landskrona BoIS
- Djurgårdens IF
- * Club domestic league appearances and goals

Mats Olof Aronsson (born 16 Augusti 1951) is a Swedish former footballer who played as a forward for the Swedish clubs Landskrona BoIS and Djurgårdens IF. He became the top scorer in Allsvenskan 1977 together with Reine Almqvist. Between 2007 and the spring of 2014 he worked as the Director of Sports in the Swedish football club Landskrona BoIS. He is the current chairman of IK Frej Täby.

== Honours ==
Djurgårdens IF

- Division 2 Norra: 1982

Individual

- Allsvenskan top scorer: 1977 (shared with Reine Almqvist)
