= Arne Larsson (footballer, born 1931) =

Swedish footballer (1931–2011)

Personal information
- Date of birth: 27 April 1931
- Date of death: 3 November 2011 (aged 80)
- Position: Defender

Senior career*
Years	Team	Apps	(Gls)
- Djurgården

International career
1954	Sweden	3	(0)
- * Club domestic league appearances and goals

Arne Larsson (27 April 1931 – 3 November 2011) was a Swedish footballer who played as a defender. He made three appearances for Sweden. Larsson died on 3 November 2011, at the age of 80.
