= Bernt Andersson =

Swedish footballer (1933–2020)

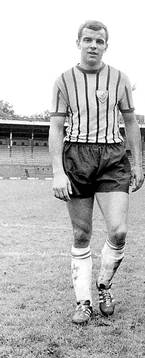
- Andersson in 1964

Personal information
- Date of birth: 5 September 1933
- Date of death: 6 January 2020 (aged 86)
- Position: Midfielder

Senior career*
Years	Team	Apps	(Gls)
- Sundbybergs IK
1952–1965	Djurgårdens IF	91	(19)

Managerial career
- Gustavsberg
- Älvsjö AIK
- 1972: Halmstads BK
- Vasalunds IF
- Helsingborgs IF
- * Club domestic league appearances and goals

Bernt "Sump-Hugo" Andersson (5 September 1933 – 6 January 2020) was a Swedish football player and manager. A midfielder, he made 91 Allsvenskan appearances for Djurgårdens IF and scored 19 goals.

== Honours ==
Djurgårdens IF

- Allsvenskan: 1954–55, 1964
