= Bo Finnhammar =

Swedish footballer (1933–2013)

Personal information
- Date of birth: 5 June 1933
- Date of death: 2013

Senior career*
Years	Team	Apps	(Gls)
- Djurgården
- * Club domestic league appearances and goals

Bo Finnhammar (5 June 1933 – 2013) was a Swedish footballer. Finnhammar made 18 Allsvenskan appearances for Djurgården and scored 10 goals.
