= Kamratvallen =

Sports ground in Holmsund, Sweden

Coordinates: 63°42′5″N 20°21′13″E

- Interactive map of Kamratvallen
- Location: Holmsund, Sweden
- Type: sports ground

Tenant
- IFK Holmsund

Kamratvallen was a football stadium in Holmsund, Sweden and the home stadium for the football team IFK Holmsund. It was demolished in 2022.
