= Rolf Fransson =

Swedish footballer

Senior career*
Years	Team	Apps	(Gls)
	Djurgården	17	(0)
- * Club domestic league appearances and goals

Rolf Fransson (30 October 1942 – 21 October 2016) was a Swedish footballer. Fransson made 17 Allsvenskan appearances for Djurgården and was part of the 1966 Swedish championship team.
