= Reine Almqvist =

Swedish footballer and manager (born 1949)

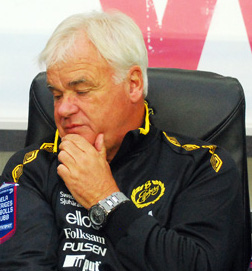
- Almqvist in 2015

Personal information
- Full name: Rolf Reine Almqvist
- Date of birth: 12 April 1949 (age 77)
- Place of birth: Gothenburg, Sweden
- Position: Striker

Senior career*
Years	Team	Apps	(Gls)
1967–1972	IFK Göteborg	79	(43)
1973–1975	Åtvidabergs FF	70	(35)
1976	IFK Sundsvall	12	(2)
1976–1980	IFK Göteborg	75	(29)
1980	Seattle Sounders	5	(0)
1980–1981	Seattle Sounders (indoor)	17	(11)
1981–1982	BK Häcken	41	(13)
1983	Ope IF		
1984	Djerv 1919		

International career
1966–1967	Sweden U19	10	(5)
1969–1975	Sweden U21	8	(1)
1970–1979	Sweden	4	(1)

Managerial career
- 1977–1978: IF Olsfors
- 1982: Kullens BK
- 1983: BK Häcken
- 1984–1985: Djerv 1919
- 1986–1987: Fredrikstad FK
- 1989–1993: BK Häcken
- 1994–1997: Helsingborgs IF
- 1998–1999: IFK Göteborg
- 2000: Landskrona BoIS
- 2001–2003: Bryne
- 2004–2005: FK Tønsberg
- 2006: BK Häcken
- 2007–2008: Västra Frölunda IF
- 2009: IF Olsfors
- * Club domestic league appearances and goals

Rolf Reine Almqvist (born 12 April 1949) is a Swedish former professional football player and coach who played as striker.

== Club career ==
Almqvist played for IFK Göteborg, Åtvidabergs FF, IFK Sundsvall, In 1980, he joined the Seattle Sounders of the North American Soccer League, playing five games during the outdoor season and another seventeen during the 1980–81 NASL indoor season. He then returned to Sweden and played for BK Häcken, Ope IF and Djerv 1919. He was the Allsvenskan top scorer in 1969 and 1977.

== International career ==
Almqvist won four caps and scored one goal between 1970 and 1979 for the Sweden national team. He also represented the Sweden U19 and U21 teams.

== Managerial career ==
Almqvist coached IF Olsfors, Kullens BK, BK Häcken, Djerv 1919, Fredrikstad FK, Helsingborgs IF, IFK Göteborg, Landskrona BoIS, Bryne, FK Tønsberg and Västra Frölunda IF.

== Career statistics ==
=== International ===
Appearances and goals by national team and year
National team	Year	Apps	Goals
Sweden	1970	1	1
Sweden	1971	0	0
Sweden	1972	0	0
Sweden	1973	0	0
Sweden	1974	1	0
Sweden	1975	0	0
Sweden	1976	0	0
Sweden	1977	0	0
Sweden	1978	0	0
Sweden	1979	2	0
Total		4	1

Scores and results list Sweden's goal tally first, score column indicates score after each Almqvist goal.

List of international goals scored by Reine Almqvist
No.	Date	Venue	Opponent	Score	Result	Competition	Ref.
1	26 August 1970	Helsinki Olympic Stadium, Helsinki, Finland	Finland	1–0	2–1	1968–71 Nordic Football Championship	

== Honours ==
IFK Göteborg

- Allsvenskan: 1969

Åtvidabergs FF

- Allsvenskan: 1973

Individual

- Allsvenskan top scorer: 1969, 1977 (shared with Mats Aronsson)
- Årets ärkeängel: 1978
