= John Eriksson (footballer) =

Swedish footballer and manager (1929–2020)

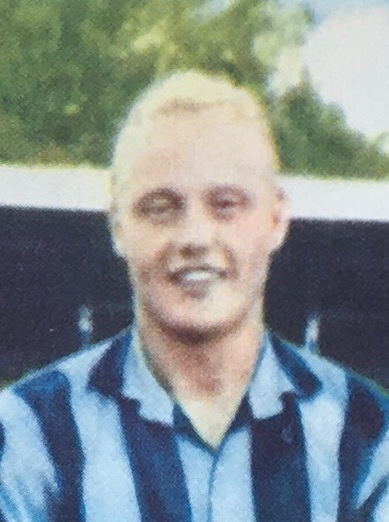
- Eriksson in 1960

Personal information
- Full name: John Rune Eriksson
- Date of birth: 12 March 1929
- Place of birth: Stockholm, Sweden
- Date of death: 24 March 2020 (aged 91)
- Position: Forward

Youth career
- Värtans IK

Senior career*
Years	Team	Apps	(Gls)
1948–1950	Värtans IK		
1951–1960	Djurgårdens IF	120	(69)
- Vällingby AIK

International career
1951–1955	Sweden	10	(9)
1955	Sweden B	1	(1)

Managerial career
- 1961: Ängby SK
- Vällingby AIK (playing manager)
- 1967–1968: IF Brommapojkarna
- 1969–1971: IF Brommapojkarna (youth coach)
- 1972: Ängby IF
- * Club domestic league appearances and goals

John Rune "Jompa" Eriksson (12 March 1929 – 24 March 2020) was a Swedish footballer and manager who most notably played as a forward for Djurgårdens IF. A full international between 1951 and 1955, he won ten caps for the Sweden national team and scored nine goals.

== Club career ==
Eriksson made his senior team debut for Värtans IK in 1948. He moved to Djurgården and made his debut in a 3–1 win against GAIS on 29 July 1951. With Djurgården, he won the Allsvenskan in 1954–55 and 1959.

== International career ==
He made his international debut in the 1948–51 Nordic Football Championship match against Finland national football team. In total, he made ten appearances and scored nine goals.

== Management career ==
After his Djurgårdens years, Eriksson became playing manager for Vällingby AIK. Later, he was manager for IF Brommapojkarna.

== Honours ==
Djurgårdens IF

- Allsvenskan: 1954–55, 1959
