= Carl Fagerberg (sculptor) =

Swedish sculptor

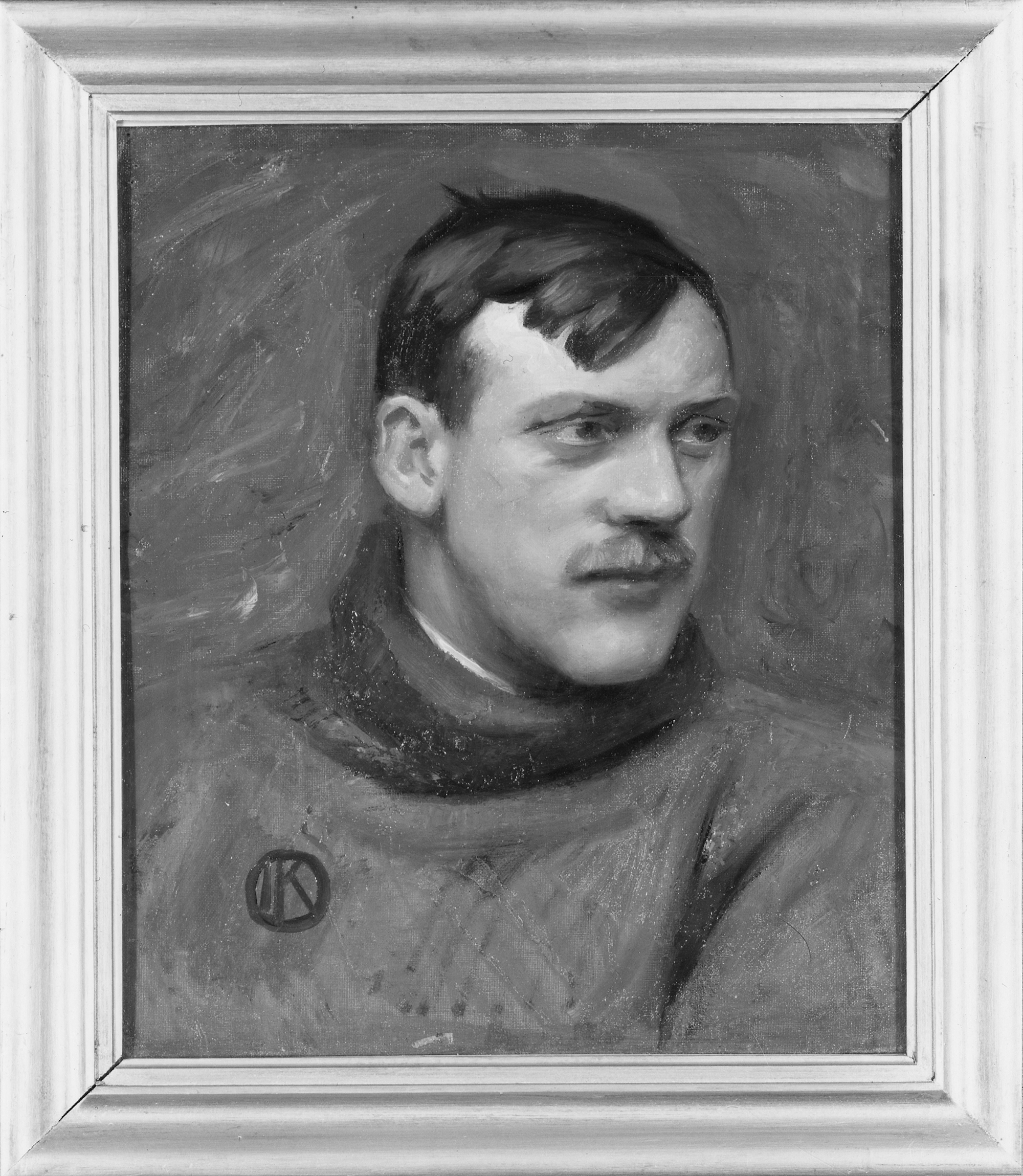
Portrait of the sculptor Carl Fagerberg; oil painting by Ivar Kamke (1882–1936), 1906. Nationalmuseum, Gripsholm Castle.

Carl Vilhelm Fagerberg (3 November 1878 - 23 April 1948) was a Swedish sculptor. His work was part of the art competitions at the 1932 Summer Olympics and the 1936 Summer Olympics.

Carl Fagerberg was the son of construction and carpentry master Johannes Fagerberg and his wife Sofia Sandberg. He studied at the Royal Academy of Arts in Stockholm in 1902–1905 and abroad at Jenny Lindstipendium 1905–1908. At the Royal Swedish Academy of Arts in Stockholm, some of his fellow students included Ivar Arosenius, John Bauer, Karl Isakson Ivar Kamke and David Wallin. He received SM in Buenos Aires in 1919 and honored at the Olympic Games in Los Angeles in 1932. He is famous for his portraits, sculptures of animals and athletes as well as decorations in churches. He lived and worked in the city of Sundbyberg, a municipality in Stockholm County in east central Sweden, just north of the capital Stockholm. Arvid Knöppel studied sculpture for him. Carl Fagerberg was unmarried.

== Gallery ==
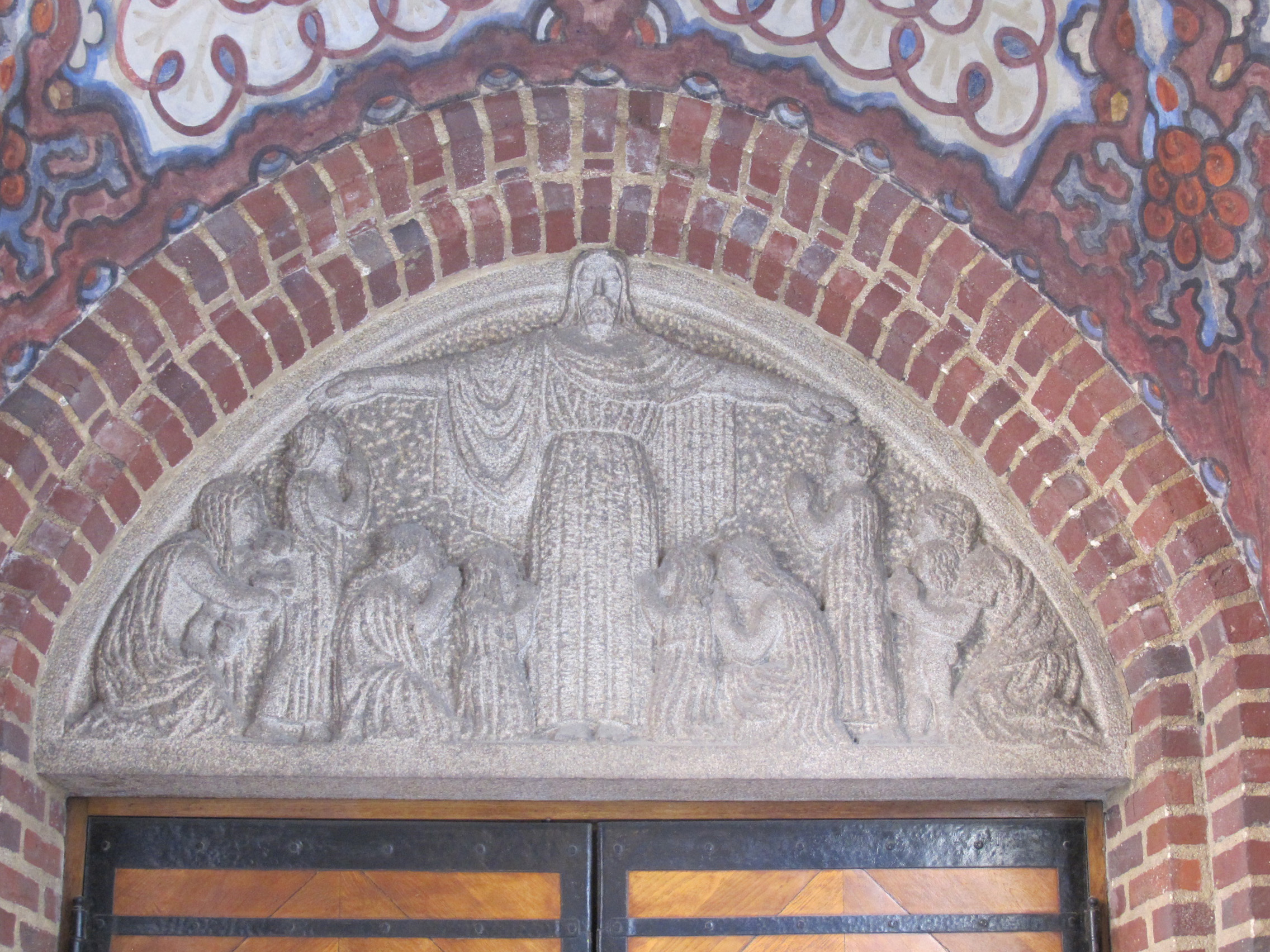
Relief in The Swedish Church in Paris (Svenska Sofiaförsamlingen i Paris), Swedish Sofia Assembly in Paris. Relief with the motif Christ blesses the children, 1913.

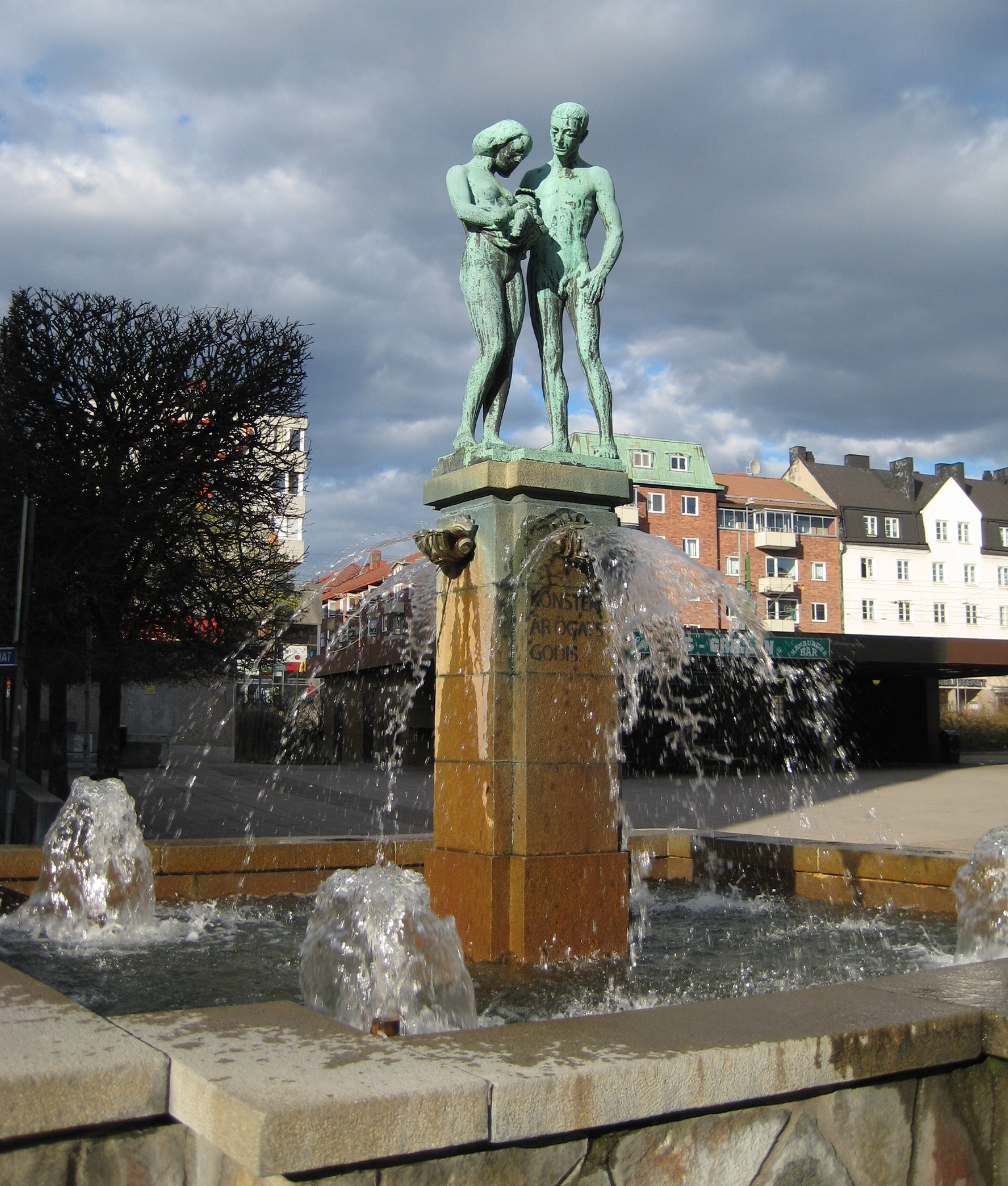
Sculpture in Sundbyberg of Industry fountain with The happy family ("Lyckliga familjen"'), 1933.

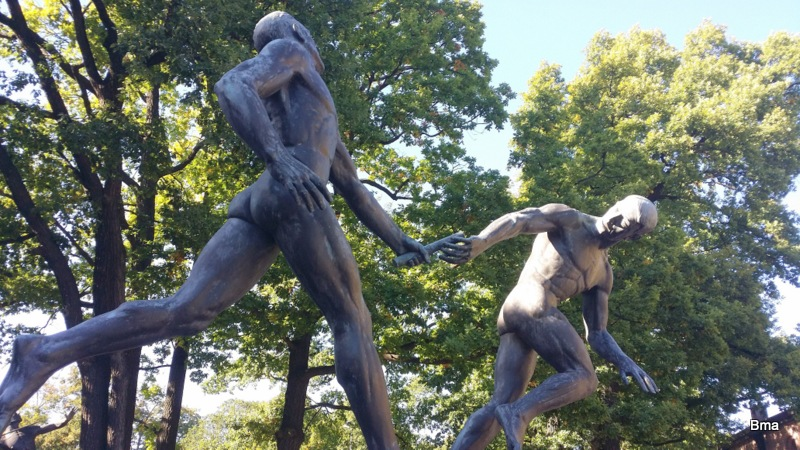
Sculpture at Stockholm Olympic Stadium of the Relay runners, 1937.

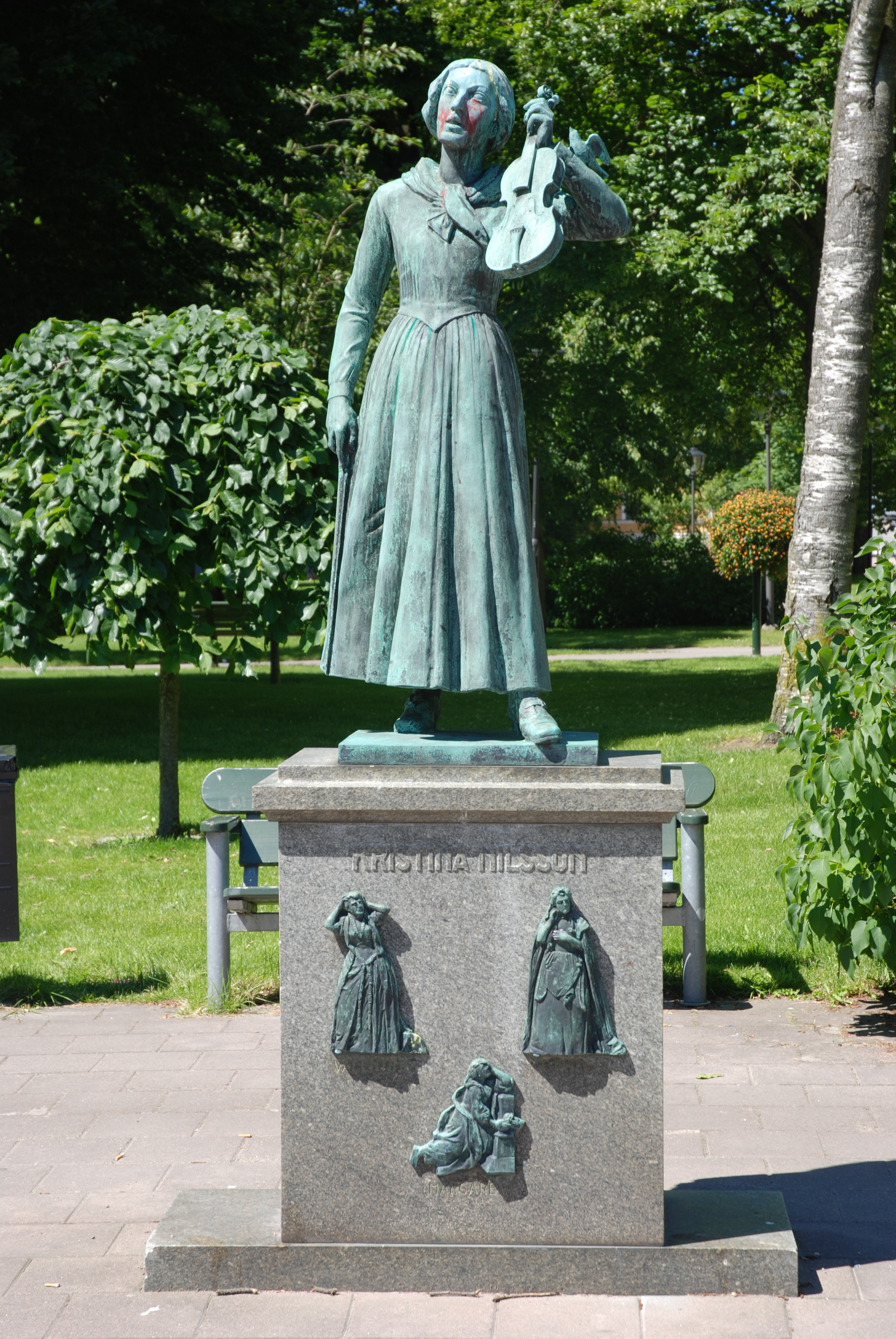
Statue in Ljungby of the opera singer Kristina Nilsson (1843-1921), 1938.
