= Björn Carlsson (footballer, born 1954) =

Swedish footballer

Personal information
- Date of birth: 1954 (age 71–72)

Senior career*
Years	Team	Apps	(Gls)
1976–1978	Djurgården	22	(1)
- * Club domestic league appearances and goals

Björn Carlsson (born 1954) is a Swedish former footballer. Carlsson made 22 Allsvenskan appearances for Djurgården between 1976 and 1978 and scored 1 goal. He started off his career at Nyköpings BIS.
