= Arne Arvidsson =

Swedish footballer and bandy player (1929–2008)

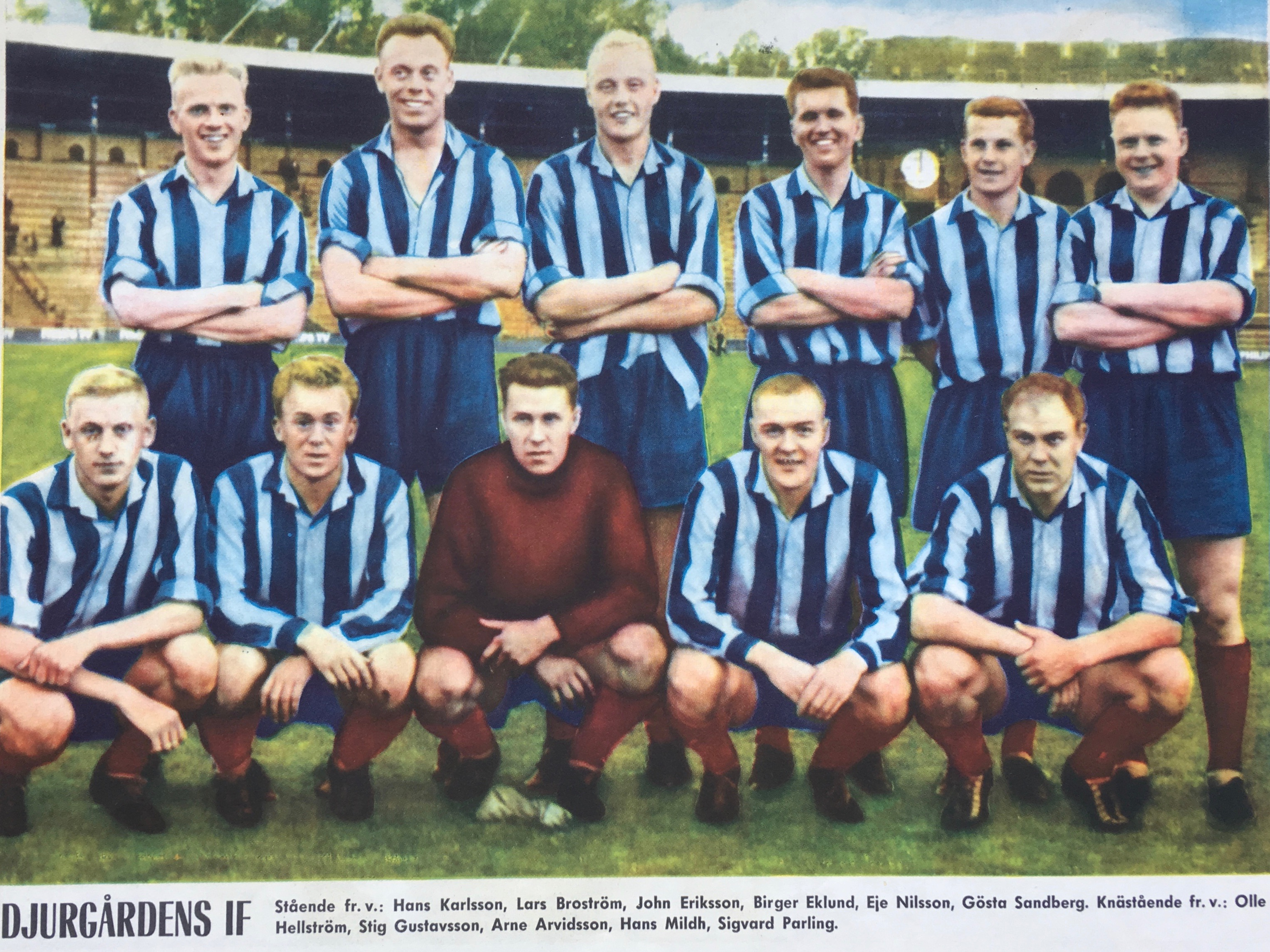
- Djurgårdens IF's golden team in 1959

Personal information
- Full name: Arne Arvidsson
- Date of birth: 19 January 1929
- Place of birth: Långshyttan, Sweden
- Date of death: 30 September 2008 (aged 79)
- Position: Goalkeeper

Youth career
- Långshyttans AIK

Senior career*
Years	Team	Apps	(Gls)
–1951	Långshyttans AIK		
1952–1957	Djurgårdens IF	88	(0)
1957	IFK Eskilstuna	0	(0)
1957–1965	Djurgårdens IF	175	(0)
1966–1967	IK Sirius	44	(0)
1973	Djurgårdens IF	0	(0)

International career
1954–1963	Sweden B	13	(0)
1954–1965	Sweden	27	(0)
- * Club domestic league appearances and goals

Arne Arvidsson (19 January 1929 – 30 September 2008) was a Swedish footballer who played as a goalkeeper. He also played bandy for Djurgårdens IF Bandy in the 1960s.

== Club career ==
Arvidsson started his career in Långshyttans AIK and joined Djurgårdens IF in 1952. He made his debut in a game against Hälsingborgs IF the same year. With Djurgården, he won the Allsvenskan in 1954–55, 1959, 1964. In 1966, he joined IK Sirius for two seasons. In 1973, he was back in Djurgårdens IF for one Intertoto Cup match.

== International career ==
He made his international debut in the 1952–55 Nordic Football Championship match against [Norway national team. In total, he made 27 appearances.

== Honours ==
Djurgårdens IF

- Allsvenskan: 1954–55, 1959, 1964
- Division 2 Svealand: 1961
