= Carl Fagerberg (footballer) =

Swedish footballer

Senior career*
Years	Team	Apps	(Gls)
- Djurgården
- * Club domestic league appearances and goals

Carl Fagerberg was a Swedish footballer. Fagerberg was part of the Djurgården Swedish champions' team of 1920.

== Honours ==
=== Club ===
Djurgårdens IF

- Svenska Mästerskapet: 1920
