= IFK Holmsund =

Swedish football club

- Full name: Idrottsföreningen Kamraterna Holmsund
- Founded: 8 June 1923
- Ground: Kamratvallen, Holmsund
- Website: lagsidan.se/ifkholmsund

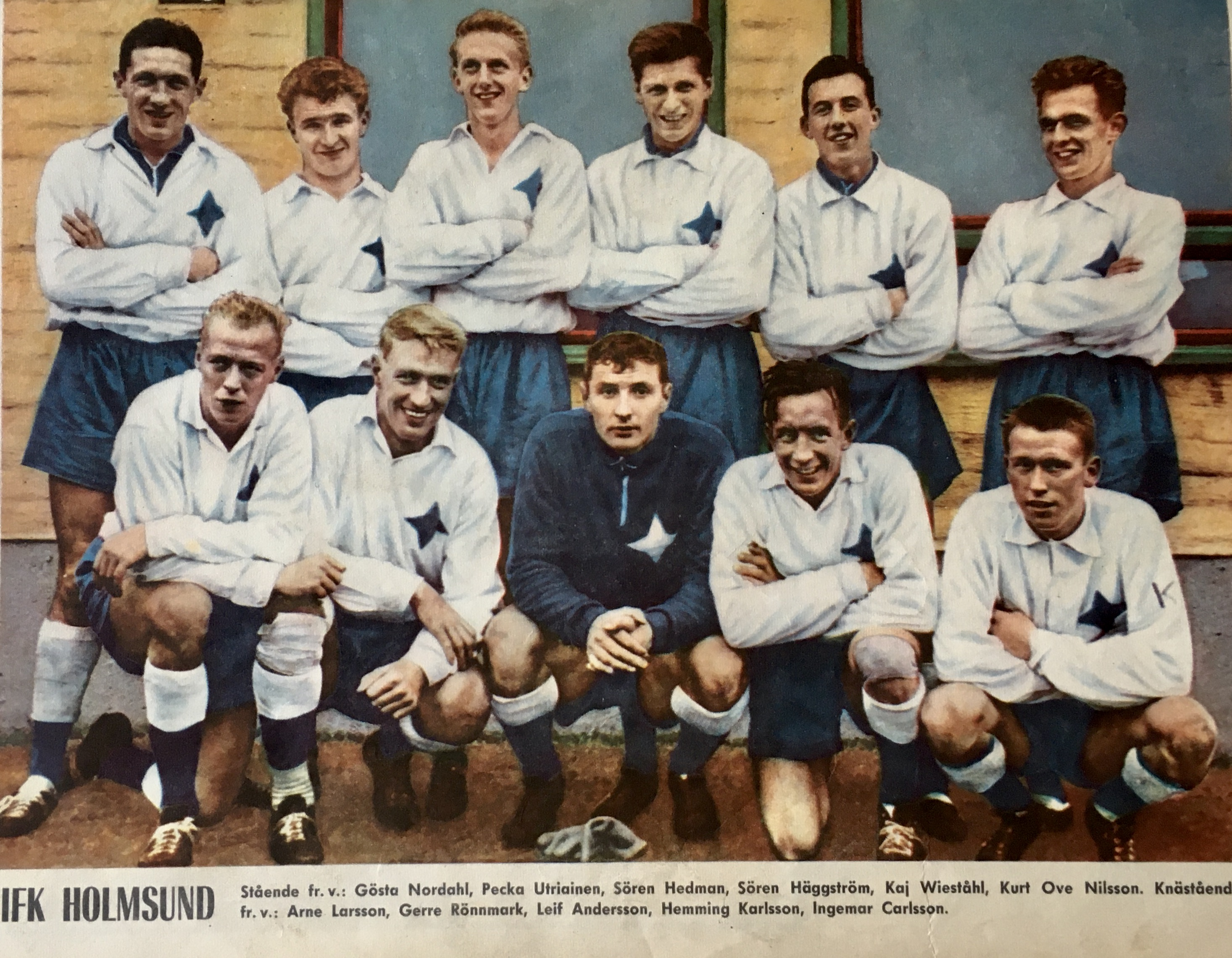
IFK Holmsund of 1960

Idrottsföreningen Kamraterna Holmsund, commonly known as IFK Holmsund, is a football club from Holmsund, Sweden, founded on 8 June 1923 that plays its home games at Kamratvallen. They took part in the 1967 Allsvenskan. They folded and were restarted in 1990.

English footballer and actor Vinnie Jones played for the club in 1986.

During the 1960s, the club scored local bandy successes, winning the Västerbotten District Championship.
