= Bosse Nilsson =

Swedish footballer and manager

Personal information
- Full name: Bo Tommy Leonard Nilsson
- Date of birth: 18 August 1944 (age 82)
- Place of birth: Höör, Sweden
- Position: Defender

Senior career*
Years	Team	Apps	(Gls)
–1961	Tjörnarps BoIF		
1962–1966	IFK Hässleholm		
1967–1968	Djurgårdens IF	1	(0)
1969–1973	IFK Hässleholm		

Managerial career
- 1974–1978: IFK Hässleholm
- 1979–1980: Mjällby AIF
- 1986: Vilans BoIF
- 1987–1994: Helsingborgs IF
- 1994: Silkeborg IF
- 1995: Al Tawoon
- 1996: West Riffa
- 1997: Degerfors IF
- 1998: Chengdu
- 1999: West Riffa
- 2007–2009: Helsingborgs IF
- * Club domestic league appearances and goals

Bo Tommy Leonard "Bosse" Nilsson (born 18 August 1944) is a Swedish football manager and former footballer (defender).

He played for Tjörnarps BoIF, IFK Hässleholm and Djurgårdens IF.

He coached IFK Hässleholm, Mjällby AIF, Helsingborgs IF, Silkeborg IF, Degerfors IF, Al Tawoon, West Riffa and Chengdu.
