= Stig Åkerström =

Swedish footballer

Stig ”Särna” Åkerström
Personal information
- Date of birth: 15 March 1943 (age 83)
- Date of death: 2022-10-29
- Position: Forward

Senior career*
Years	Team	Apps	(Gls)
- Djurgården
- * Club domestic league appearances and goals

Stig Åkerström (born 15 March 1943) is a Swedish former footballer who played as a forward. He made 89 Allsvenskan appearances for Djurgården and scored 10 goals.
