= Torsten Furukrantz =

Swedish footballer (1937–2019)

Personal information
- Date of birth: 21 June 1937
- Place of birth: Stockholm, Sweden
- Date of death: 12 September 2019 (aged 82)
- Position: Defender

Senior career*
Years	Team	Apps	(Gls)
–1963	IFK Stockholm		
1963–1966	Djurgårdens IF		
1966–1973	IK Sirius		
- * Club domestic league appearances and goals

Torsten Furukrantz (21 June 1937 – 12 September 2019) was a Swedish footballer who played as a defender for IFK Stockholm, Djurgårdens IF, and IK Sirius.

== Career ==
Furukrantz made his debut in the Swedish Division 2 with IFK Stockholm in 1959. He remained at the club until 1963 when he joined Djurgårdens IF. At Djurgården, he debuted in May 1963 against Hammarby IF. In 1964 he won Allsvenskan. In 1966, Furukrantz was one of five championship-winning players which signed with IK Sirius. He stayed at IK Sirius until 1973 and became a coach in 1974.

== Honours ==
Djurgårdens IF

- Allsvenskan: 1964
