= Hans Jonsson (footballer) =

Swedish footballer

Senior career*
Years	Team	Apps	(Gls)
- Djurgården
- * Club domestic league appearances and goals

Hans Jonsson is a Swedish retired footballer. Jonsson made 41 Allsvenskan appearances for Djurgården and scored 7 goals.
