= Boris Johansson =

Swedish footballer (born 1936)

Personal information
- Position: Forward

Senior career*
Years	Team	Apps	(Gls)
1964–1965	Djurgårdens IF		
- * Club domestic league appearances and goals

Boris Johansson is a Swedish former footballer who played as a forward for Djurgårdens IF.

== Honours ==
Djurgårdens IF

- Allsvenskan (1): 1964
