= Leif Skiöld =

Swedish footballer and ice hockey player

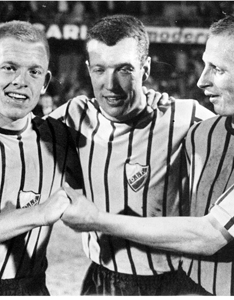
- Leif Skiöld representing Djurgårdens IF's soccer team
- Born: 28 July 1935; Nynäshamn, Sweden
- Died: 27 October 2014 (aged 79)
Association football career
- Position: Forward
Youth career
- Nynäshamns IF
Senior career*
Years	Team	Apps	(Gls)
1947–1954	Nynäshamns IF		
1954–1959	AIK	89	(48)
1960–1965	Djurgårdens IF	75	(60)
1965–1966	IFK Luleå		
1967–1969	Nynäshamns IF		
1967–1969	Sorunda IF		
1967–1969	Nynäshamns IF		
International career
	Sweden U21	3	(0)
	Sweden B	2	(1)
1962	Sweden	4	(4)
Managerial career
- 1965–1966: IFK Luleå (playing manager)
- * Club domestic league appearances and goals
Ice hockey career
- Position: Forward
- Played for: Djurgårdens IF; Nynäshamns IF
- Playing career: 1959–1973

Leif Gustav Skiöld (28 July 1935 – 27 October 2014) was a Swedish footballer and ice hockey player. As an ice hockey player Skiöld won three Swedish Championships with Djurgårdens IF.

Brother of Tommy Skiöld.

== Playing career ==
=== Club ===
Skiöld played for Nynäshamns IF, AIK, Djurgårdens IF, and IFK Luleå. He was the 1962 Allsvenskan top scorer.

=== International ===
He made his international debut in the 1960–63 Nordic Football Championship match against Norway national football team. In total, he made four appearances and scored four goals.

== Honours ==
=== Club ===
Djurgårdens IF

- Division 2 Svealand: 1961
- Allsvenskan: 1964

=== Individual ===
- Allsvenskan Top Scorer (1): 1962
