= Jan Öhman =

Swedish footballer

Personal information
- Date of birth: 4 July 1942 (age 84)
- Place of birth: Stockholm, Sweden
- Position: Left winger

Senior career*
Years	Team	Apps	(Gls)
1954–1958	AIK		
1960–1962	Hagalunds IS		
1966–1968	Djurgårdens IF		
1968–1969	St. Louis Stars	7	(0)
1969–1971	IK Sirius		
- * Club domestic league appearances and goals

Jan Öhman (born 4 July 1942 in Stockholm, Sweden) is a Swedish former footballer. He played for AIK, Hagalunds IS, Djurgårdens IF, St. Louis Stars, and IK Sirius.

== Career ==
Öhman played with St. Louis Stars during the 1968 season and made seven appearances (0 goals).

== Honours ==
=== Club ===
Djurgårdens IF

- Allsvenskan (1): 1966
