= Jan Svensson (footballer, born 1944) =

Swedish footballer

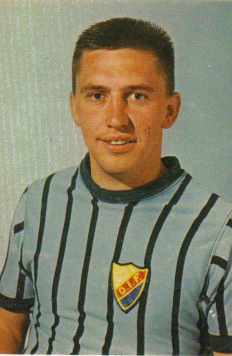
- Svensson with Djurgårdens IF in 1968.

Personal information
- Full name: Jan Svensson
- Date of birth: 27 April 1944 (age 82)
- Place of birth: Karlskrona, Sweden
- Position: Midfielder

Senior career*
Years	Team	Apps	(Gls)
–1966	Saltö BK		
1967–1971	Djurgårdens IF	89	(11)
1972–1973	IS Halmia		
1974–1979	Hammarby IF	117	(0)
- * Club domestic league appearances and goals

Jan "Lillen" Svensson (born 27 April 1944) is a Swedish former footballer who played as a midfielder, best known for representing Hammarby IF and Djurgårdens IF in Allsvenskan.

== Club career ==
=== Saltö BK ===
Born in Karlskrona, Svensson started his career with local club Saltö BK. In 1966, Saltö was relegated from Division 3, Sweden's third tier, due to being deducted 14 points by the Swedish FA after Svensson had been incorrectly registered during the season.

=== Djurgårdens IF ===
In 1967, Svensson moved to Djurgårdens IF in Allsvenskan. Known as a hard-working central midfielder, he made 89 appearances for the club and scored eleven goals.

=== IS Halmia ===
Between 1972 and 1974, Svensson played for IS Halmia. He was later voted as one of the best eleven players to ever had represented the club.

=== Hammarby IF ===
In 1974, Svensson returned to Stockholm but moved to Hammarby IF, one of Djurgården's biggest rivals. He started to work as a groundskeeper at Zinkensdamms IP, where Hammarby's bandy section played their home games.

Svensson went on to play six full seasons with Hammarby in Allsvenskan, playing a total of 117 games but failing to score a single competitive goal. He retired from football at the end of 1979, aged 34.
