= Björn Jonsson =

Swedish footballer (born 1944)

Personal information
- Full name: Björn Harry Jonsson
- Date of birth: 14 January 1944 (age 82)
- Position: Defender

Senior career*
Years	Team	Apps	(Gls)
- Djurgården
- * Club domestic league appearances and goals

Björn Harry Jonsson (born 14 January 1944) is a Swedish footballer. Jonsson made 89 Allsvenskan appearances for Djurgården. He played as a defender.
