= 1964 Allsvenskan =

40th season of Allsvenskan

Allsvenskan
- Season: 1964
- Champions: Djurgårdens IF
- Relegated: IFK Eskilstuna; GAIS
- European Cup: Djurgårdens IF
- Matches: 132
- Goals: 462 (3.5 per match)
- Average goals/game: 3,50
- Top goalscorer: Krister Granbom, Helsingborgs IF (22)
- Biggest home win: IFK Norrköping v IFK Eskilstuna 7–1; Malmö FF v IFK Eskilstuna 6–0
- Biggest away win: Helsingborgs IF v Örgryte IS 1–6
- Highest scoring: IF Elfsborg v GAIS 7–3
- Average attendance: 11,294

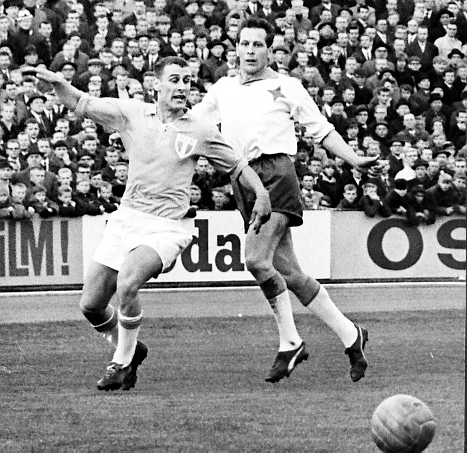
Malmö FF-IFK Norrköping.

Statistics of Allsvenskan in season 1964.

== Overview ==
The league was contested by 12 teams, with Djurgårdens IF winning the championship. Three top teams finished all with same points, but Djurgården was declared the champion because it had the largest goal difference. The tournament started on 12 April and ended on 25 October.

== League table ==
Pos	Team	Pld	W	D	L	GF	GA	GD	Pts	Qualification or relegation
1	Djurgårdens IF (C)	22	13	5	4	46	20	+26	31	Qualification to 1965–66 European Cup preliminary round (Note: Djurgården qualified for the 1965–66 European Cup as Allsvenskan champions of 1964.)
2	Malmö FF	22	13	5	4	45	20	+25	31	Qualification to 1964–65 European Cup preliminary round (Note: Malmö FF qualified for the 1964–65 European Cup as Allsvenskan leaders in the spring of 1964.)
3	Örgryte IS	22	14	3	5	54	36	+18	31	
4	IFK Norrköping	22	11	6	5	55	28	+27	28	
5	IF Elfsborg	22	12	2	8	42	32	+10	26	
6	Degerfors IF	22	9	4	9	40	47	−7	22	
7	AIK	22	8	3	11	38	38	0	19	
8	Örebro SK	22	7	5	10	24	35	−11	19	
9	IFK Göteborg	22	8	2	12	31	46	−15	18	
10	Hälsingborgs IF	22	7	3	12	42	53	−11	17	
11	IFK Eskilstuna (R)	22	4	6	12	24	49	−25	14	Relegation to Division 2
12	GAIS (R)	22	2	4	16	21	58	−37	8	Relegation to Division 2

Rules for classification: 1) points; 2) goal difference; 3) number of goals scored.
(C) Champions; (R) Relegated

== Results ==
Home \ Away	AIK	DEG	DJU	GAIS	HIF	IFE	IFKE	IFKG	IFKN	MFF	ÖSK	ÖIS
AIK		3–1	0–0	2–0	5–2	0–1	0–0	1–2	3–3	1–3	4–0	3–1
Degerfors IF	3–1		1–2	5–2	5–2	3–1	3–2	1–2	3–1	1–1	1–1	0–3
Djurgårdens IF	3–0	3–0		3–1	5–0	1–1	5–0	4–1	5–4	0–0	3–1	1–1
GAIS	0–4	2–3	1–4		0–1	1–5	1–3	0–1	0–0	0–3	0–1	0–2
Hälsingborgs IF	3–0	5–0	0–1	4–1		2–3	2–3	2–2	0–1	2–2	3–0	1–6
IF Elfsborg	3–0	6–1	2–0	7–3	4–3		2–1	0–1	0–2	0–2	1–0	3–0
IFK Eskilstuna	1–3	0–0	2–0	2–2	0–0	3–1		1–2	0–4	1–2	2–2	1–4
IFK Göteborg	1–3	2–0	1–3	1–2	1–3	0–2	0–0		1–5	2–6	1–2	3–5
IFK Norrköping	3–2	2–2	1–1	0–1	1–2	5–0	7–1	2–0		3–0	4–0	2–2
Malmö FF	2–1	0–2	1–0	4–1	4–1	0–0	6–0	3–0	2–0		1–1	1–2
Örebro SK	2–1	0–2	2–0	1–1	4–1	2–0	1–0	0–2	2–2	1–2		0–1
Örgryte IS	4–1	6–3	0–2	2–2	5–3	2–0	2–1	1–5	1–3	1–0	3–1	

Legend: Blue = home team win; Yellow = draw; Red = away team win.

== Attendances ==
No.	Club	Average attendance	Highest attendance
1	Örgryte IS	18,529	30,080
2	IFK Göteborg	18,033	42,689
3	Malmö FF	15,284	22,470
4	AIK	13,565	35,170
5	Djurgårdens IF	12,753	25,718
6	IFK Norrköping	11,935	25,038
7	IF Elfsborg	9,646	17,271
8	IFK Eskilstuna	9,132	13,120
9	GAIS	8,715	15,937
10	Hälsingborgs IF	7,635	16,679
11	Örebro SK	7,277	12,910
12	Degerfors IF	6,964	10,828

== Footnotes ==
- "Swedish Football Tables - List of final tables". RSSSF. 2011.
