= Dan Brzokoupil =

Swedish footballer (born 1947)

Personal information
- Full name: Dan Holger Brzokoupil
- Date of birth: 8 May 1947 (age 79)
- Place of birth: Stockholm, Sweden
- Position: Striker

Youth career
- Talldungens IK

Senior career*
Years	Team	Apps	(Gls)
1967–1971	Djurgårdens IF	87	(28)
1972–1974	Landskrona BoIS	72	(13)
1975–1976	Hammarby IF	44	(5)
1977	Nyköpings BIS	12	(3)
Total		215	(49)

International career
1968–1969	Sweden U21	7	(1)
1970–1971	Sweden	5	(3)

Managerial career
- Hjärnarps GIF
- * Club domestic league appearances and goals

Dan Holger Brzokoupil (born 8 May 1947) is a Swedish former footballer who played as a striker. He represented Djurgårdens IF, Landskrona BoIS, Hammarby IF, and Nyköpings BIS during a club career that spanned between 1967 and 1977. A full international between 1970 and 1971, he won five caps and scored three goals for the Sweden national team.

== Club career ==
Brzokoupil, who has Czechoslovak roots, played for Djurgårdens IF, Landskrona BoIS and Hammarby IF. He made 87 Allsvenskan matches for Djurgårdens IF and scored 28 goals.

== International career ==
Brzokoupil was capped five times for the Sweden national team and scored three goals. He also represented the Sweden U21 team between 1968 and 1969, scoring one goal in seven matches.

== Career statistics ==
=== International ===
Appearances and goals by national team and year
National team	Year	Apps	Goals
Sweden	1970	4	3
Sweden	1971	1	0
Total		5	3

Scores and results list Sweden's goal tally first, score column indicates score after each Brzokoupil goal.

List of international goals scored by Dan Brzokoupil
No.	Date	Venue	Opponent	Score	Result	Competition	Ref.
9	26 August 1970	Olympic Stadium, Helsinki, Finland	Finland	2–0	2–1	1968–71 Nordic Football Championship	
10	13 September 1970	Ullevaal Stadion, Oslo, Norway	Norway	2–2	4–2	1968–71 Nordic Football Championship	
11	14 October 1970	Dalymount Park, Dublin, Ireland	Republic of Ireland	1–1	1–1	UEFA Euro 1972 qualifying	
