= Hans Karlsson (footballer) =

Swedish footballer

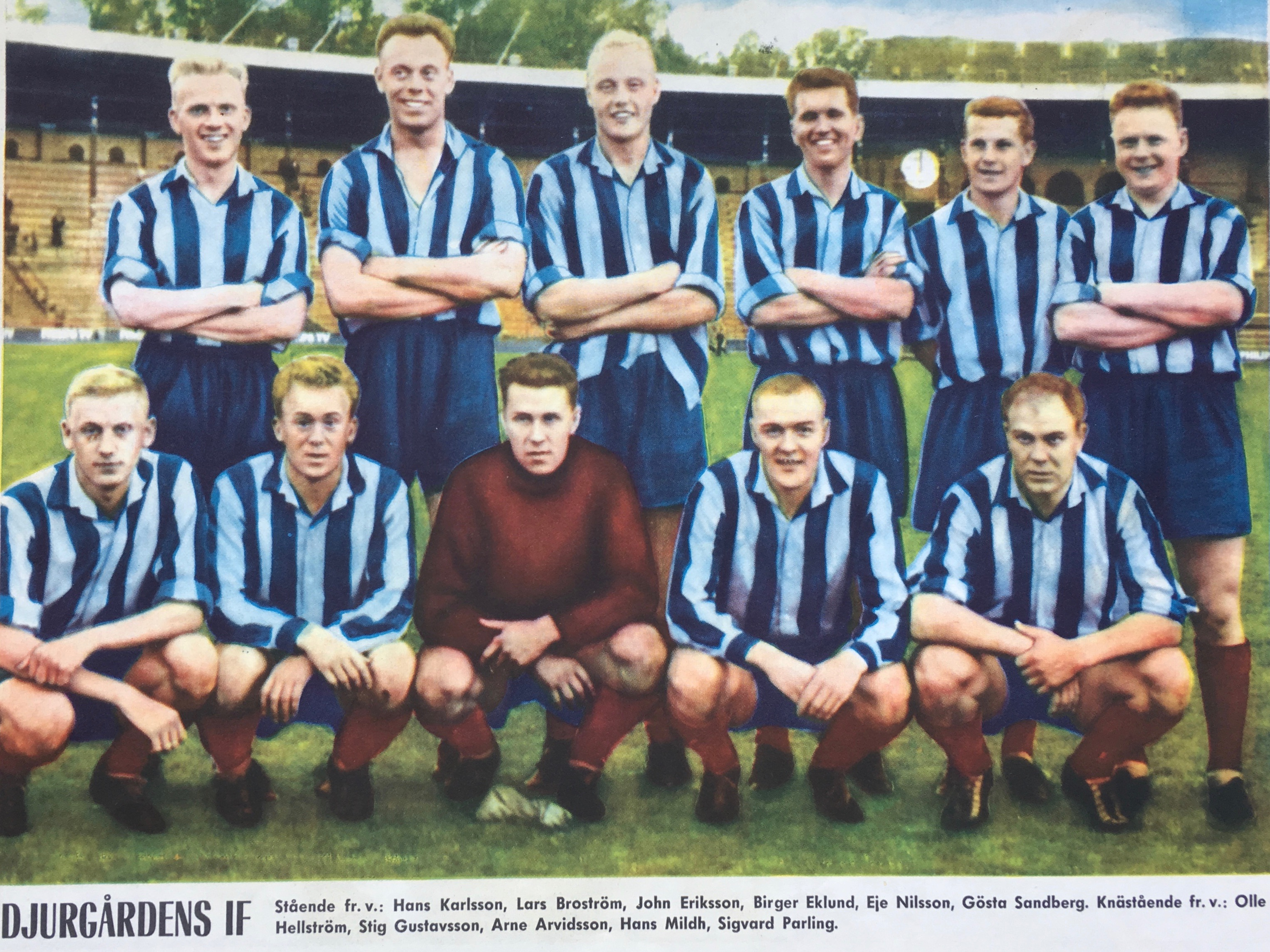

Personal information
- Date of birth: 1 September 1932
- Date of death: 1 June 2008 (aged 75)
- Position: Defender

Senior career*
Years	Team	Apps	(Gls)
1957–1964	Djurgårdens IF		

International career
1959	Sweden B	1	(0)

Managerial career
- 1968–1969: Elfsborg
- 1970–1973: IFK Göteborg
- 1974–1976: Sweden (women)
- 1977–1978: IFK Göteborg
- * Club domestic league appearances and goals

Hans "Hasse" Karlsson (1 September 1932 – 1 June 2008) was a Swedish footballer who played as a defender. He made 119 Allsvenskan appearances for Djurgårdens IF and scored 29 goals. A former manager of IF Elfsborg, IFK Göteborg and the Sweden women's national football team, he died in June 2008.

== Honours ==
Djurgårdens IF

- Allsvenskan: 1959, 1964
