= Ulf Schramm =

Swedish footballer

Senior career*
Years	Team	Apps	(Gls)
- Djurgården
- * Club domestic league appearances and goals

Ulf Schramm is a Swedish former footballer. Schramm was part of the Djurgårdens IF Swedish champions' team of 1964. He made 15 Allsvenskan appearances for Djurgården and scored three goals

== Honours ==
Djurgårdens IF

- Allsvenskan: 1964
