= Kay Wiestål =

Swedish footballer (1940–2020)

Personal information
- Full name: Kay-Arne Arvid Wiestål
- Date of birth: 16 October 1940
- Place of birth: Holmsund, Sweden
- Date of death: 14 November 2020 (aged 80)

Senior career*
Years	Team	Apps	(Gls)
1963–1967	Djurgårdens IF	71	(25)
1968	Oakland Clippers	9	(1)
1968	St. Louis Stars	11	(2)
1970–	Ope IF		

Managerial career
- 1970–: Ope IF (playing manager)
- 1975–1976: Kalmar FF
- * Club domestic league appearances and goals

Kay-Arne Arvid Wiestål (16 October 1940 – 14 November 2020) was a Swedish footballer and entrepreneur.

== Career ==
Wiestål played for Djurgårdens IF and won Allsvenskan in 1966. He later played in the North American Soccer League for Oakland Clippers and St. Louis Stars. In 1970, he joined Ope IF as playing manager.

== Death ==
Wiestål died on 14 November 2020, at the age of 80, from COVID-19.

== Honours ==
Djurgårdens IF

- Allsvenskan: 1966
