= Lars-Olof Sandberg =

Swedish footballer

Personal information
- Date of birth: 1940 (age 85–86)
- Position: Forward

Senior career*
Years	Team	Apps	(Gls)
1962–1965	Djurgården		
- * Club domestic league appearances and goals

Lars-Olof Sandberg (born 1940) is a Swedish former footballer who played as a forward. Sandberg was part of the Djurgården Swedish champions' team of 1964. Sandberg made 34 Allsvenskan appearances for Djurgården and scored 6 goals.

== Honours ==
Djurgårdens IF

- Allsvenskan: 1964
