= Sven Lindman =

Swedish footballer (1942–2025)

Personal information
- Date of birth: 19 April 1942
- Place of birth: Ormsjö, Sweden
- Date of death: 17 November 2025 (aged 83)
- Position: Midfielder

Youth career
- Ormsjö IF Uven

Senior career*
Years	Team	Apps	(Gls)
–1961	Ormsjö IF Uven		
1961–1965	Lycksele IF		
1965–1968	Djurgårdens IF	57	(27)
1968–1969	Rapid Wien	14	(1)
1969–1980	Djurgårdens IF	255	(24)
1981	Helenelunds IF		

International career
	Sweden U23	2	(0)
	Sweden B	1	(1)
1967–1974	Sweden	21	(1)

Managerial career
- 1982–1986: Karlstads BK
- 1987–1991: Norrstrands IF
- 1983–1994: Malungs IF
- * Club domestic league appearances and goals

Sven Henrik Lindman (19 April 1942 – 17 November 2025) was a Swedish footballer who played as a midfielder, spending most of his career with Djurgårdens IF. He played there between 1965 and 1980 and set a club record by making 312 appearances in Allsvenskan. During his time, he scored 49 goals for the club. He was capped 21 times and scoring one goal for the Sweden national team. He was a member of Sweden's 1974 FIFA World Cup squad.

== Club career ==
Sven Lindman was born on 19 April 1942. He started his career in local Ormsjö team Ormsjö IF Uven. In 1961, he joined Lycksele IF and later became the top scorer of Swedish football Division 2. In 1965, Lindman continued to Djurgårdens IF and was a part of the 1966 Allsvenskan winning team and scored the match-winning goal in the final match against IFK Norrköping, In 1968, he moved to Rapid Wien, where he stayed for one season. He ended his contract and rejoined Djurgården. He finished his career there in the 1980 season. He made 175 consecutive appearances for Djurgårdens IF between 1970 and 1977.

== International career ==
Lindman made his international A debut in 1967 and played 21 matches for the Sweden national team, in which he scored one goal. He was selected in Sweden's 1974 FIFA World Cup squad, however, he did not play in the tournament.

== Managerial career ==
After his playing career, Lindman took over Karlstads BK for five seasons and later Norrstrands IF for another five seasons as a manager.

== Personal life and death ==
Lindman died on 17 November 2025, at the age of 83. He was the brother of Djurgården footballer Jörgen Lindman.

== Career statistics ==
Appearances and goals by club, season and competition
Club	Season	League			Cup		Europe		Total	
Club	Season	Division	Apps	Goals	Apps	Goals	Apps	Goals	Apps	Goals
Djurgården	1965	Allsvenskan	2	1	—				2	1
Djurgården	1966	Allsvenskan	22	12	—		2	0	24	12
Djurgården	1967	Allsvenskan	22	6	2	0	2	0	26	6
Djurgården	1968	Allsvenskan	11	8	0	0			11	8
Djurgården	Total		57	27	2	0	4	0	63	27
Rapid Wien	1968–69	Nationalliga	14	1	4	2	3	2	21	5
Djurgården	1969	Allsvenskan	11	2	0	0			11	2
Djurgården	1970	Allsvenskan	20	2					20	2
Djurgården	1971	Allsvenskan	22	6			2	0	24	6
Djurgården	1972	Allsvenskan	22	3					22	3
Djurgården	1973	Allsvenskan	26	6					26	6
Djurgården	1974	Allsvenskan	26	0			4	0	30	0
Djurgården	1975	Allsvenskan	26	1			2	0	28	1
Djurgården	1976	Allsvenskan	26	1			2	0	28	1
Djurgården	1977	Allsvenskan	18	0					18	0
Djurgården	1978	Allsvenskan	25	0					25	0
Djurgården	1979	Allsvenskan	23	1					23	1
Djurgården	1980	Allsvenskan	10	2					10	2
Djurgården	Total		255	24	0	0	10	0	265	24
Career total			326	52	6	2	17	2	349	56

== Honours ==
Djurgårdens IF

- Allsvenskan: 1966
