= Conny Granqvist =

Swedish footballer and manager

Personal information
- Date of birth: 30 March 1947 (age 79)
- Position: Forward

Senior career*
| Years | Team | Apps | (Gls) |
| 1966–1973 | Djurgårdens IF | 133 | (21) |

International career
| 1969 | Sweden U23 | 4 | (1) |

Managerial career
- 1983: IK Brage
- * Club domestic league appearances and goals

Conny Granqvist (born 30 March 1947) is a Swedish former footballer and manager. A forward, made 133 Allsvenskan appearances for Djurgårdens IF and scored 21 goals.

== Honours ==
Djurgårdens IF

- Allsvenskan: 1966
