= Peder Persson =

Swedish footballer

Personal information
- Date of birth: 13 November 1938
- Place of birth: Hova, Sweden
- Date of death: 17 February 2018 (aged 79)
- Position: Forward

Senior career*
Years	Team	Apps	(Gls)
- Forward
- Örebro SK
1964–1967	Djurgården		

International career
1962–1963	Sweden B	3	(3)
- * Club domestic league appearances and goals

Peder Persson (13 November 1938 – 17 February 2018) was a Swedish footballer who played as a forward. Persson was part of the Djurgården IF Allsvenskan-winning teams of 1964 and 1966.

Persson was born in Hova, Sweden, and played for BK Forward and Örebro SK before joining Djurgården in 1964. He made 57 Allsvenskan appearances for Djurgården and scored 24 goals.

Persson died on 17 February 2018.

== Honours ==
Djurgårdens IF

- Allsvenskan: 1964, 1966
