= Hans Nilsson (footballer) =

Swedish footballer and bandy player (1941–2024)

Personal information
- Full name: Hans Erik Nilsson
- Date of birth: 7 November 1941
- Place of birth: Stockholm, Sweden
- Date of death: 16 November 2024 (aged 83)
- Place of death: Stockholm, Sweden
- Position: Midfielder

Youth career
- 1954–1958: Talldungens IF
- IFK Stockholm

Senior career*
Years	Team	Apps	(Gls)
1960–1962	IFK Stockholm		
1962–1966	Djurgårdens IF	77	(42)
1966	→ AIK (loan)	0	(0)
1966–1968	IK Sirius	53	(45)
1969–1973	Djurgårdens IF	88	(19)
1974–1975	IK Sirius	50	(11)
1976–1978	IF Brommapojkarna	73	(11)
1979	IK Sirius	12	(2)
1980–1983	Vallentuna BK		

International career
	Sweden U23	4	(1)
	Sweden B	5	(3)
1971	Sweden	1	(0)

Managerial career
- Vallentuna BK (playing manager)
- Edsbro IF
- IFK Österåker
- Enebybergs IF
- Rådmansö SK
- * Club domestic league appearances and goals

Hans Erik "Trisse" Nilsson (7 November 1941 – 16 November 2024) was a Swedish footballer, bandy and ice hockey player.

Nilsson played his bandy in Djurgårdens IF and ice hockey in IFK Stockholm.

== Club career ==
Nilsson played for IFK Stockholm, Djurgårdens IF, IK Sirius, IF Brommapojkarna and Vallentuna BK. He won the Allsvenskan in 1964.

== International career ==
Nilsson made one match for Sweden national team, the UEFA Euro 1972 qualifying 3–0 loss against Italy.

He also made four Sweden U23 matches (one goal) and five Sweden B matches (three goals).

== Death ==
Nilsson died in Stockholm on 16 November 2024, at the age of 83.

== Honours ==
Djurgårdens IF

- Allsvenskan: 1964

IK Sirius

- Division 3 Östra Svealand: 1966
- Division 2 Svealand: 1968
