= Willy Gummesson =

Swedish footballer (1944–2016)

Personal information
- Date of birth: 8 April 1944
- Date of death: 25 April 2016 (age 72)
- Position: Defender

Senior career*
Years	Team	Apps	(Gls)
- Saxemara IF
1966–1971	Djurgårdens IF	117	(2)
1972–1974	Helsingborgs IF		
- IFK Sollentuna

International career
1966–1967	Sweden U23	10	(0)
1968	Sweden	1	(0)
- * Club domestic league appearances and goals

Willy Gummesson (8 April 1944 – 25 April 2016) was a Swedish footballer. He made 117 Allsvenskan appearances for Djurgårdens IF and scored two goals. He died on the 25th of April, 2016 at Danderyd Hospital following a short illness.

== Honours ==
=== Club ===
Djurgårdens IF

- Allsvenskan: 1966
