= Jan-Erik Sjöberg =

Swedish footballer (born 1946)

Personal information
- Full name: Anders Jan-Erik Sjöberg
- Date of birth: 14 September 1946 (age 80)
- Position: Midfielder

Youth career
- Djurgårdens IF

Senior career*
Years	Team	Apps	(Gls)
–1964	Älvsjö AIK		
1965–1973	Djurgårdens IF	173	(16)
1974–1977	Landskrona BoIS	104	(4)
1978–1979	Vilans BoIF	33	(3)

International career
	Sweden U18	16	(1)
1965–1969	Sweden U23	11	(2)
1968	Sweden	1	(0)
- * Club domestic league appearances and goals

Anders Jan-Erik Sjöberg (born 14 September 1946) is a Swedish former footballer. He made 173 Allsvenskan appearances for Djurgårdens IF and scored 16 goals.

== Honours ==
=== Club ===
Djurgårdens IF

- Allsvenskan: 1966
