= Hans Mild =

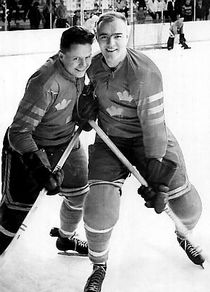
- Hans Mild (on the right) and Gösta Sandberg playing ice hockey for Team Sweden during the World Championships in Switzerland in March 1961
- Born: Hans Hjalmar Mild; 31 July 1934; Stockholm, Sweden
- Died: 23 December 2007 (aged 73); Stockholm, Sweden
- Height: 1.87 m (6 ft 1 1/2 in)
Association football career
- Position: Defender
Youth career
- Karlbergs BK
Senior career*
Years	Team	Apps	(Gls)
–1965	Djurgårdens IF	179	(7)
1966–1969	IK Sirius	85	(1)
1970	IK City		
1972	IK City	5	(0)
International career
	Sweden B	5	(0)
1961–1965	Sweden	31	(1)
Managerial career
- 1965–1969: IK Sirius (playing manager)
- 1970: IK City (playing manager)
- 1971–1972: IK Sirius
- * Club domestic league appearances and goals
Ice hockey career
- Position: Left wing
- Shot: Left
- Played for: Karlbergs BK; IK Göta; Djurgårdens IF; Hammarby IF
- National team: Sweden
- Playing career: 1954–1969

Olympic medal record
Silver medal – second place	1964 Innsbruck	Team competition

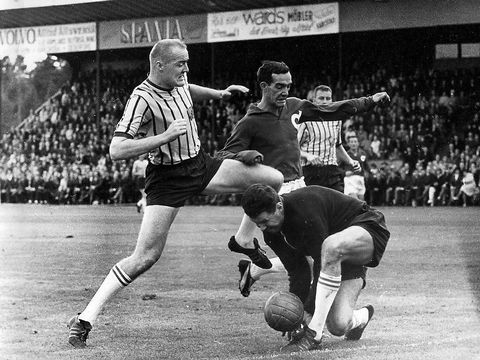
Hans Mild for Djurgårdens IF and Tord Grip for Degerfors IF during a soccer game.

Hans Hjalmar "Tjalle" Mild (31 July 1934 – 23 December 2007) was a Swedish football, ice hockey and bandy player.

== Career ==
Mild won Allsvenskan two times with Djurgårdens IF and capped 31 times for the national team. In 1964, Mild won the Guldbollen as the best Swedish football player of the year.

As an ice hockey player Mild played for IK Göta, Djurgårdens IF, and Hammarby IF and became Swedish champion six times. He also made 63 appearances in the national team and was a part of the silver winning team in the 1964 Winter Olympics.

== Honours ==
=== Club ===
Djurgårdens IF

- Allsvenskan (2): 1959, 1964
- Division 2 Svealand (1): 1961

=== Individual ===
- Guldbollen (1): 1964
