= Inge Karlsson =

Swedish footballer

Personal information
- Full name: Inge Lars Karlsson
- Date of birth: 25 September 1946 (age 80)
- Position: Defender

Senior career*
Years	Team	Apps	(Gls)
1965–1973	Djurgårdens IF	164	(0)

International career
1964–1965	Sweden U19	4	(0)
1965–1967	Sweden U23	7	(0)
- * Club domestic league appearances and goals

Inge Karlsson (born 25 September 1946) is a Swedish former footballer. He made 164 Allsvenskan appearances for Djurgårdens IF.

== Honours ==
=== Club ===
Djurgårdens IF

- Allsvenskan: 1966
