= Ronney Pettersson =

Swedish footballer (1940–2022)

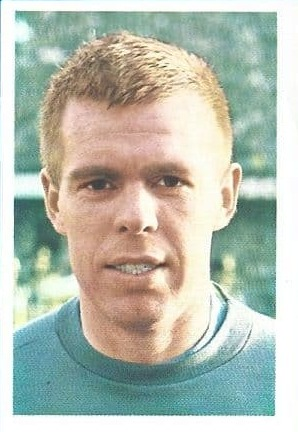
- Pettersson in 1970

Personal information
- Date of birth: 26 April 1940
- Place of birth: Sweden
- Date of death: 26 September 2022 (aged 82)
- Position: Goalkeeper

Youth career
- IFK Skövde

Senior career*
Years	Team	Apps	(Gls)
–1957	IFK Skövde		
1958–1970	Djurgårdens IF	114	(0)
1971–1977	Hudiksvalls ABK	58	(0)

International career
	Sweden U23	6	(0)
	Sweden B	2	(0)
1966–1969	Sweden	17	(0)

Managerial career
- 1972: Hudiksvalls ABK (playing manager)
- * Club domestic league appearances and goals

Ronney Pettersson (26 April 1940 – 26 September 2022) was a Swedish footballer who played as a goalkeeper.

== Career ==
Pettersson joined Djurgårdens IF from IFK Skövde in 1958 and made his debut in 1962 for Djurgårdens IF in Allsvenskan. He became champion with the team in 1966. He also made 17 appearances in the Sweden national team and was a part of the squad in the 1970 FIFA World Cup.

== Personal life and death ==
Pettersson died on 26 September 2022, at the age of 82.

== Honours ==
Djurgårdens IF

- Allsvenskan: 1966
