= 1954–55 Allsvenskan =

31st season of Allsvenskan

Allsvenskan
- Season: 1954–55
- Champions: Djurgårdens IF
- Relegated: GAIS; Kalmar FF; Sandvikens AIK
- Top goalscorer: Kurt Hamrin, AIK (22)
- Average attendance: 12,287

These are the statistics of the 1954–55 season of Allsvenskan, which is the highest tier of the Swedish football league system.

== Overview ==
The league was contested by 12 teams, with Djurgårdens IF winning the championship.

== League table ==
Pos	Team	Pld	W	D	L	GF	GA	GD	Pts	Qualification or relegation
1	Djurgårdens IF (C)	22	14	5	3	53	27	+26	33	Qualification for the European Cup first round
2	Halmstads BK	22	12	5	5	49	27	+22	29	
3	AIK	22	11	6	5	51	30	+21	28	
4	IFK Norrköping	22	8	8	6	37	29	+8	24	
5	Hälsingborgs IF	22	9	5	8	42	31	+11	23	
6	Hammarby IF	22	8	6	8	30	33	−3	22	
7	Degerfors IF	22	8	6	8	34	39	−5	22	
8	Malmö FF	22	8	5	9	33	33	0	21	
9	IFK Göteborg	22	7	6	9	32	35	−3	20	
10	GAIS (R)	22	7	6	9	35	42	−7	20	Relegation to Division 2
11	Kalmar FF (R)	22	7	3	12	31	53	−22	17	Relegation to Division 2
12	Sandvikens AIK (R)	22	2	1	19	24	72	−48	5	Relegation to Division 2

Rules for classification: 1) points; 2) goal difference; 3) number of goals scored.
(C) Champions; (R) Relegated

== Results ==
Home \ Away	AIK	DEG	DJU	GAIS	HBK	HAIF	HÄIF	IFKG	IFKN	KFF	MFF	SAIK
AIK		1–1	0–1	3–1	0–0	1–2	2–2	5–1	2–2	4–1	1–4	6–1
Degerfors IF	2–0		1–0	2–0	2–4	1–2	3–1	1–1	1–1	5–1	2–0	2–1
Djurgårdens IF	0–2	6–2		2–0	5–1	2–1	0–6	2–2	4–2	2–1	2–0	4–0
GAIS	0–3	3–0	1–5		3–1	1–1	2–1	1–0	1–1	2–0	3–3	3–0
Halmstads BK	0–1	5–1	0–0	3–0		2–0	2–0	4–0	0–4	3–0	1–1	5–1
Hammarby IF	1–3	0–0	2–3	2–5	0–0		4–2	1–0	3–1	1–3	2–1	2–0
Hälsingborgs IF	1–1	5–1	2–2	5–2	1–3	3–0		2–0	1–3	0–2	0–1	2–0
IFK Göteborg	5–3	2–1	0–2	1–1	1–1	0–0	1–3		0–0	2–3	0–1	5–2
IFK Norrköping	0–2	2–2	1–1	1–1	0–3	2–1	0–0	0–1		3–1	4–2	4–0
Kalmar FF	1–1	3–2	2–3	3–2	0–4	1–1	0–0	1–6	2–1		0–1	5–3
Malmö FF	0–1	0–1	1–1	2–2	4–2	2–2	2–4	0–2	0–2	5–0		1–0
Sandvikens AIK	4–9	1–1	0–6	3–1	3–5	0–2	0–1	1–2	1–3	2–1	1–2	

Legend: Blue = home team win; Yellow = draw; Red = away team win.

== Attendances ==
#	Club	Average	Highest
1	Djurgårdens IF	19,010	39,696
2	AIK	17,898	40,458
3	IFK Göteborg	16,019	31,897
4	GAIS	15,335	21,462
5	Malmö FF	15,020	18,655
6	Hammarby IF	14,820	30,095
7	Hälsingborgs IF	11,817	23,991
8	Halmstads BK	11,006	19,380
9	IFK Norrköping	8,953	12,025
10	Kalmar FF	7,832	12,252
11	Degerfors IF	5,310	10,453
12	Sandvikens IF	5,030	8,809
