= 1966 Allsvenskan =

42nd season of Allsvenskan

Allsvenskan
- Season: 1966
- Champions: Djurgårdens IF
- Relegated: IK Brage; Degerfors IF
- European Cup: Djurgårdens IF
- Top goalscorer: Ove Kindvall, IFK Norrköping (20)
- Average attendance: 8,668

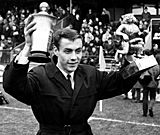
Ove Kindvall (IFK Norrköping) - 1966 Guldbollen winner

Statistics of Allsvenskan in season 1966.

== Overview ==
The league was contested by 12 teams, with Djurgårdens IF Fotboll winning the championship.

== League table ==
Pos	Team	Pld	W	D	L	GF	GA	GD	Pts	Qualification or relegation
1	Djurgårdens IF (C)	22	15	3	4	46	17	+29	33	Qualification to European Cup first round
2	IFK Norrköping	22	12	5	5	53	24	+29	29	
3	IF Elfsborg	22	11	7	4	40	26	+14	29	
4	IFK Göteborg	22	12	5	5	44	34	+10	29	
5	AIK	22	12	3	7	36	26	+10	27	
6	Örgryte IS	22	8	7	7	45	40	+5	23	
7	Örebro SK	22	8	4	10	42	44	−2	20	
8	GAIS	22	7	6	9	19	27	−8	20	
9	Malmö FF	22	6	7	9	32	34	−2	19	
10	Hälsingborgs IF	22	4	9	9	28	46	−18	17	
11	IK Brage (R)	22	5	1	16	23	53	−30	11	Relegation to Division 2
12	Degerfors IF (R)	22	2	3	17	21	58	−37	7	Relegation to Division 2

Rules for classification: 1) points; 2) goal difference; 3) number of goals scored.
(C) Champions; (R) Relegated

== Results ==
Home \ Away	AIK	DEG	DJU	GAIS	HIF	IFE	IFKG	IFKN	IKB	MFF	ÖSK	ÖIS
AIK		4–1	1–0	0–0	0–0	1–2	4–1	1–0	4–0	1–2	3–1	3–1
Degerfors IF	2–4		1–3	0–1	0–0	1–4	1–1	0–2	4–1	0–2	2–2	1–6
Djurgårdens IF	1–0	4–0		1–2	2–0	0–0	2–0	3–0	4–0	3–0	3–0	3–0
GAIS	0–1	2–0	0–0		2–3	0–2	1–5	1–1	0–2	3–1	0–3	3–2
Hälsingborgs IF	2–2	4–2	2–4	0–1		1–1	0–3	2–5	1–5	1–0	3–1	2–2
IF Elfsborg	0–1	3–0	2–1	1–1	3–3		2–3	2–1	3–0	2–2	2–1	2–1
IFK Göteborg	2–1	4–2	4–4	1–0	1–0	1–1		3–3	3–2	0–0	3–2	1–2
IFK Norrköping	6–0	4–0	3–0	0–0	0–0	2–0	4–1		3–1	3–0	6–1	0–3
IK Brage	1–2	1–0	0–1	1–0	2–2	0–3	0–2	1–3		2–1	1–5	1–3
Malmö FF	2–0	1–2	0–2	2–0	4–1	1–2	1–2	2–2	3–0		3–3	2–2
Örebro SK	1–0	2–1	1–2	0–1	5–0	3–1	2–1	0–3	2–1	2–2		2–3
Örgryte IS	1–3	3–1	1–3	1–1	1–1	2–2	0–2	3–2	4–1	1–1	3–3	

Legend: Blue = home team win; Yellow = draw; Red = away team win.

== Attendances ==
#	Club	Average	Highest
1	IFK Göteborg	13,369	23,543
2	Djurgårdens IF	11,539	39,772
3	IF Elfsborg	11,352	18,148
4	AIK	10,290	24,051
5	IFK Norrköping	9,993	16,861
6	Örgryte IS	9,682	27,594
7	Malmö FF	9,484	24,414
8	GAIS	8,561	19,990
9	Hälsingborgs IF	6,758	12,944
10	IK Brage	5,838	9,711
11	Örebro SK	4,732	8,238
12	Degerfors IF	2,463	4,278
