= Claes Cronqvist =

Swedish footballer and manager

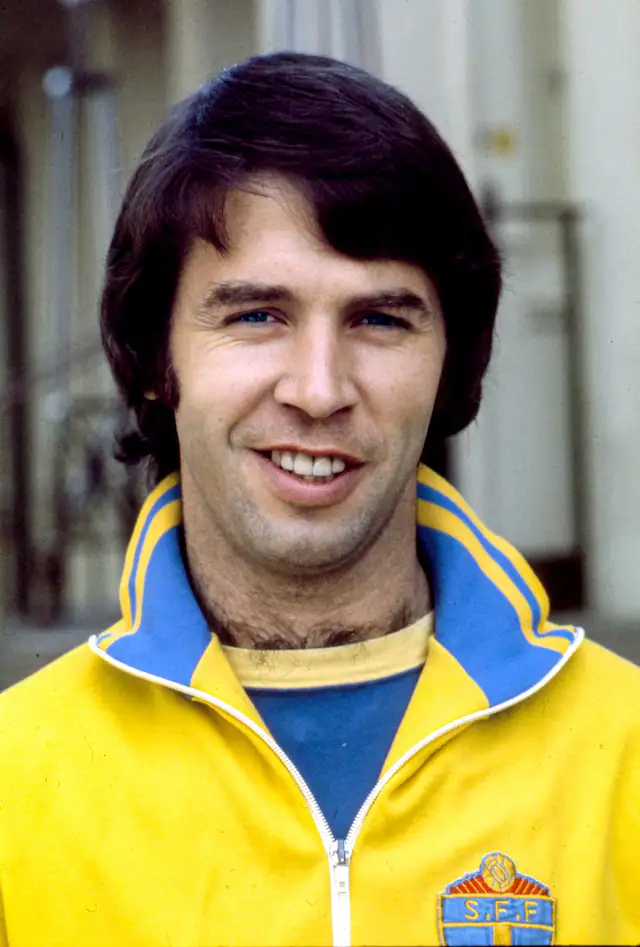

Personal information
- Date of birth: 15 October 1944 (age 82)
- Place of birth: Landskrona, Sweden
- Position: Striker

Senior career*
Years	Team	Apps	(Gls)
1962–1965	Landskrona BoIS		
1966–1970	Djurgårdens IF	104	(30)
1971–1980	Landskrona BoIS		

International career
1970–1974	Sweden	16	(0)

Managerial career
- 1983–1985: Landskrona BoIS
- * Club domestic league appearances and goals

Claes Cronqvist (born 15 October 1944) is a Swedish former footballer who played as a striker.

== Club career ==
Claes Cronqvist began his career in Landskrona BoIS in 1962, and played in 1966–1970 for Djurgårdens IF and became a Swedish champion during his first year in his new club. In 1971, he transferred back to Landskrona BoIS, where he won the Swedish cup in 1972 and two bronze medals for the seasons 1975 and 1976. He set the record for most red cards in Allsvenskan (7), later matched by Mats Rubarth, in a time when the red card was less common.

== International career ==
He was capped 16 times for the Sweden national team and was on the squads in the 1970 FIFA World Cup and in the 1974 FIFA World Cup.

== Managerial career ==
In 1981, he became manager for IFK Hässleholm. During 1983 and 1985 he became manager for his old club, Landskrona BoIS. In 1983 the team almost qualified for Allsvenskan. The following season went worse, Landskrona BoIS relegated to tier 3 of Swedish football (as one of 144 teams in 12 regional leagues, instead of 28 teams in two leagues). He continued with the club with a very weak start of the season and the second half of the 22-game league play improved. Landskrona BoIS won the regional tier 3 league and would face Linköping FF in a home and away game qualification games. The outcome would be decided by a penalty shootout at Landskrona IP; BoIS were victorious and returned to tier 2 of Swedish football in 1986. The 1985 season would be the last for Claes Cronqvist as manager at any level of importantance.

He later worked as a trainer in the lower divisions. In 2015 Claes Cronqvist was honored with a stone at the Landskrona Walk of Fame.

== Honours ==
Djurgårdens IF

- Allsvenskan: 1966

Landskrona BoIS

- Svenska Cupen: 1972
