= List of Djurgårdens IF Fotboll players (25–99 appearances) =

This list is about Djurgårdens IF players with between 25 and 99 league appearances. For a list of all Djurgårdens IF players with a Wikipedia article, see Category:Djurgårdens IF Fotboll players. For the current Djurgårdens IF first-team squad, see First-team squad.

This is a list of Djurgårdens IF players with between 25 and 99 league appearances. Since playing their first competitive match, more than 400 players have made a league appearance for the club, many of whom have played between 25 and 99 matches.

== Players ==
Matches of current players as of before 2026 season.

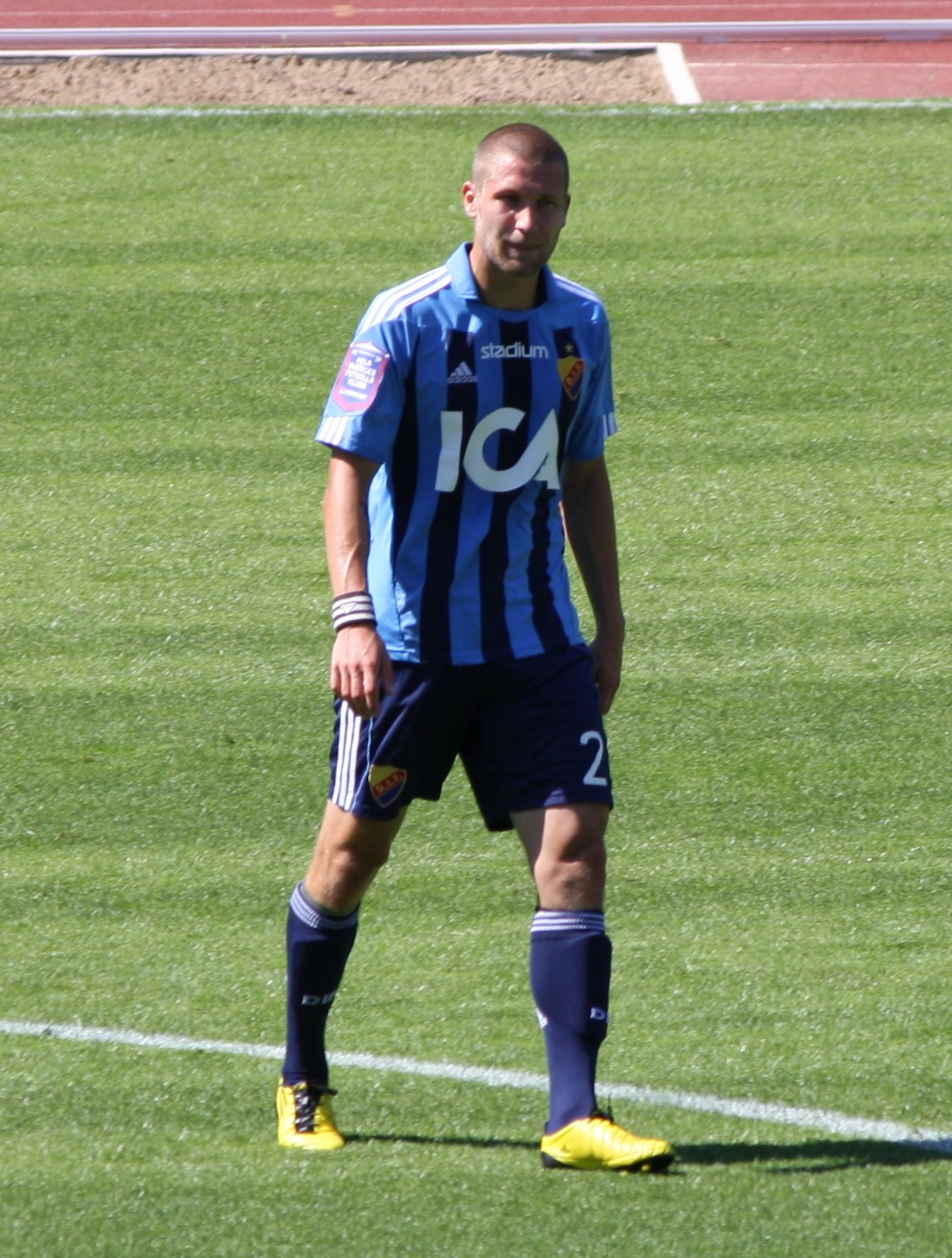
Joona Toivio has made 87 league appearances for Djurgårdens IF.

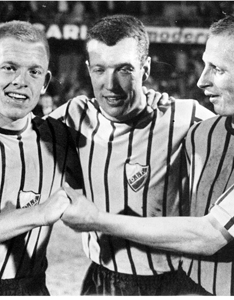
Leif Skiöld has made 75 league appearances for Djurgårdens IF.

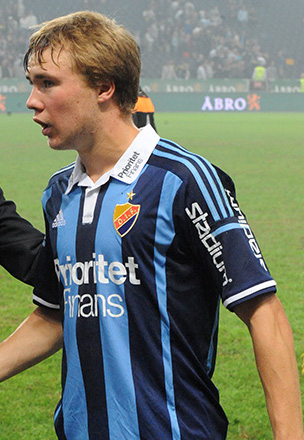
Simon Tibbling has made 73 league appearances for Djurgårdens IF.

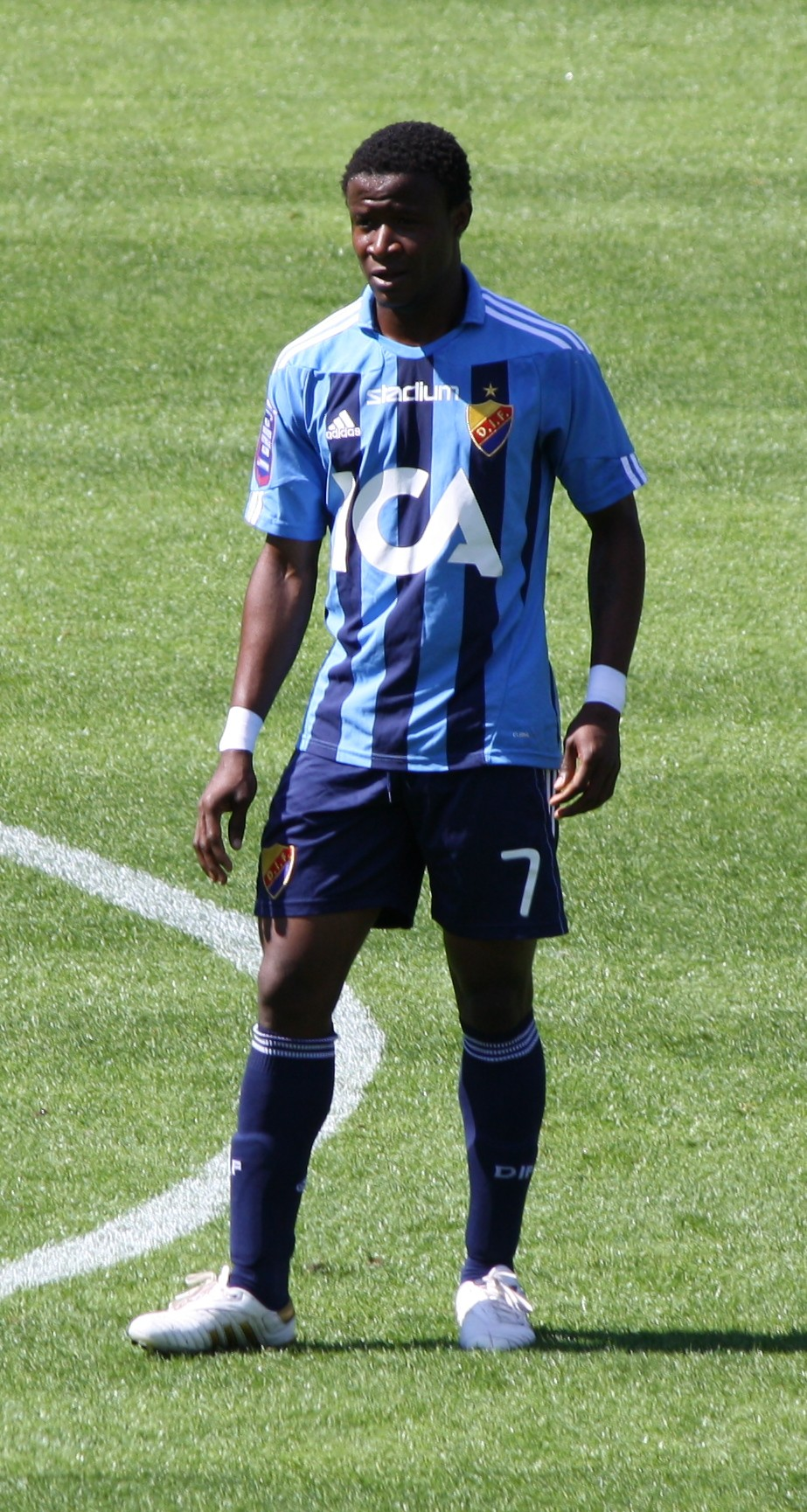
Kennedy Igboananike has made 62 league appearances for Djurgårdens IF.

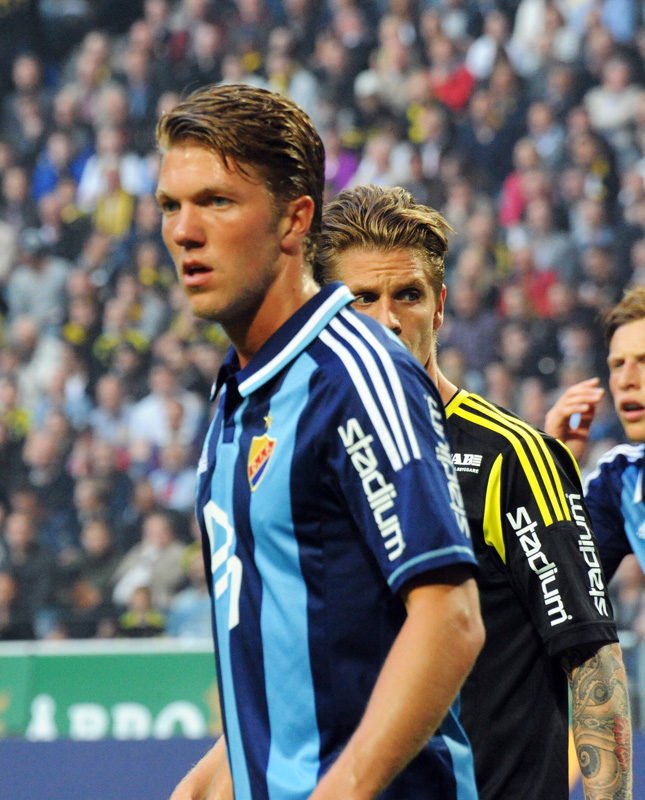
Martin Broberg has made 61 league appearances for Djurgårdens IF.

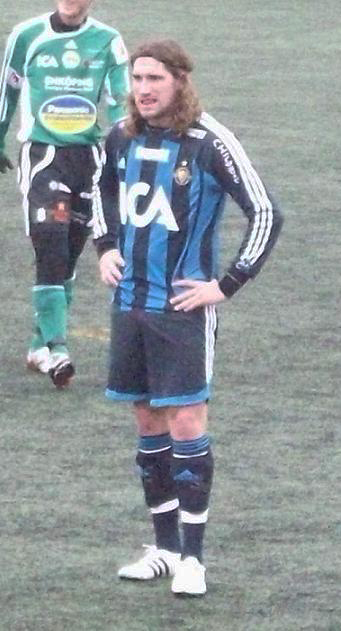
Jan Tauer has made 59 league appearances for Djurgårdens IF.

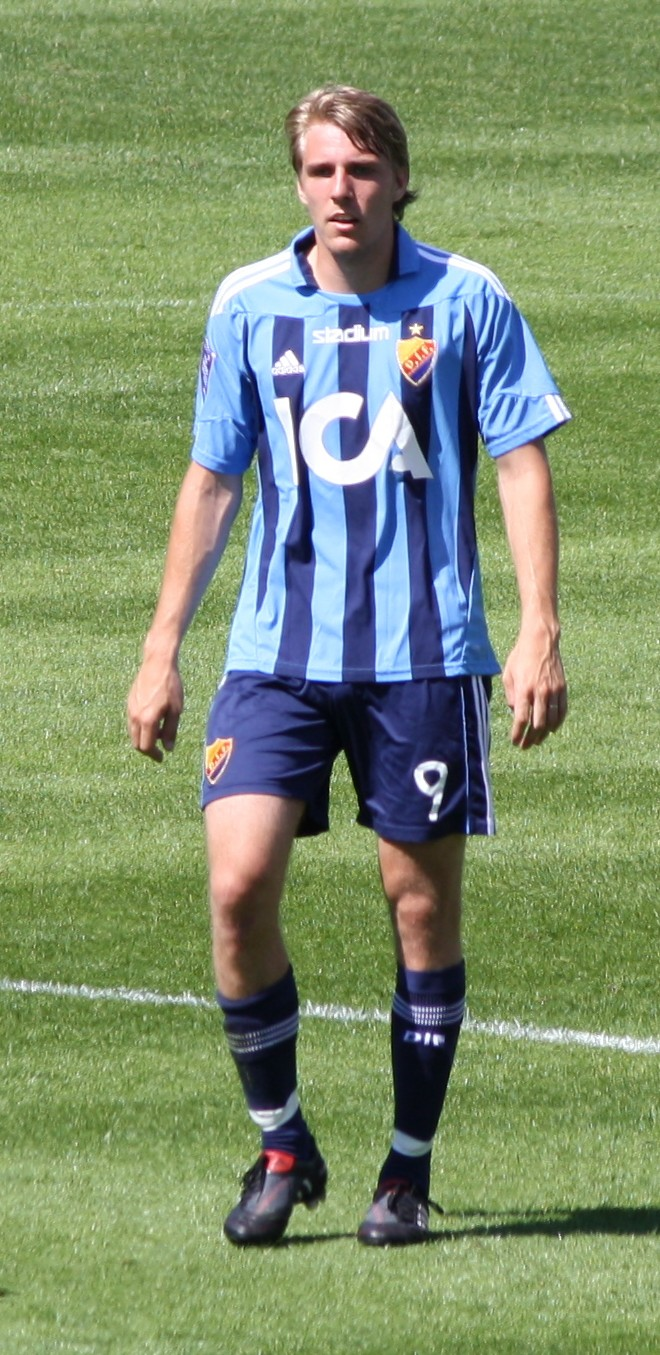
Johan Oremo has made 59 league appearances for Djurgårdens IF.

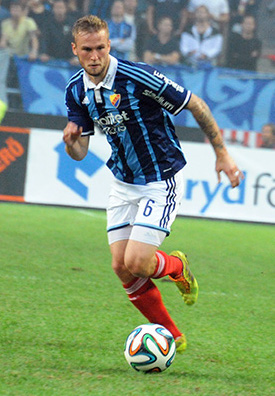
Alexander Faltsetas has made 50 league appearances for Djurgårdens IF.

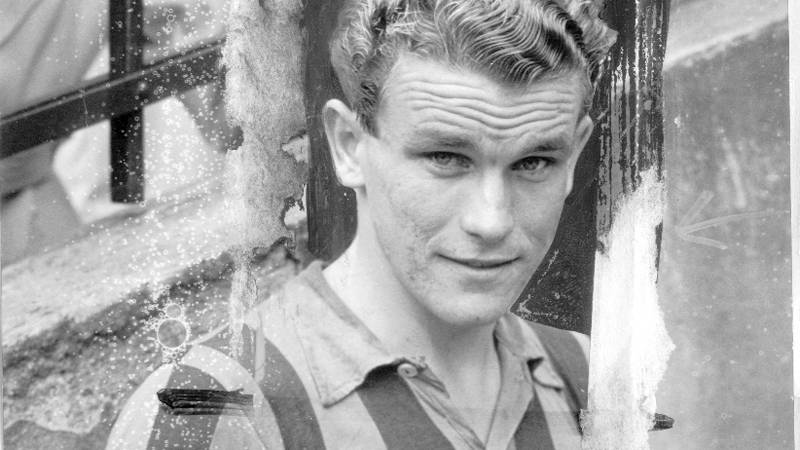
Hasse Jeppson has made 39 league appearances for Djurgårdens IF.

Name	Nationality	Position	Djurgården career	League apps	League goals
Thomas Lundmark	Sweden	MF	1990–1993	99	24
Ulf Lundberg	Sweden	DF	1981–1986	99	6
Thor André Olsen	Norway	GK	1994–1997	99	0
Philip Hellquist	Sweden	MF	2008–2014	97	10
Svante Mjörne	Sweden	MF	1983–1987	95	12
Nebojša Novaković	Serbia	FW	1993–1996	94	46
Patrik Eriksson-Ohlsson	Sweden	DF	1999–2003	94	4
Kaj Eskelinen	Sweden	FW	1994–1997	92	34
Fredrik Dahlström	Sweden	FW	1996–1999	91	38
Bernt Andersson	Sweden			91	19
Kasper Hämäläinen	Finland	MF	2010–2013	90	8
Ken Burvall	Sweden	MF	1990–1993	89	13
Stig Åkerström	Sweden			89	10
Björn Jonsson	Sweden		1965–1971	89	0
Jan Svensson	Sweden		1967–1971	88	11
Berndt Ivegren	Sweden			88	0
Bo Andersson	Sweden	FW	1994–1995; 1996–1997	87	41
Mikael Martinsson	Sweden	FW	1989–1992	87	32
Dan Brzokoupil	Sweden	FW	1967–1971	87	28
Per Lövfors	Sweden		1973–1976	87	16
Joona Toivio	Finland	DF	2010–2013	87	9
Jacob Widell Zetterström	Sweden	GK	2021-2024	87	0
Sven Tumba	Sweden		1951–1961	86	50
Hans Holmqvist	Sweden	FW	1979–1983	86	37
Kjell Karlsson	Sweden	DF	1974–1978	85	18
Mikael Dorsin	Sweden	DF	1998–2003	85	6
Stig Nyström	Sweden			84	12
Peter Langemar	Sweden		1993–1998	84	9
Joel Asoro	Sweden	FW	2021-2023; 2026	83	13
Amadou Jawo	Sweden	FW	2013–2017	82	18
Jonathan Ring	Sweden	MF	2018-2020	82	11
Fredrik Stenman	Sweden	DF	2003–2005; 2014–2015	82	8
Mats Jansson	Sweden			81	7
Fredrik Ulvestad	Norway	MF	2018–2020	80	17
Kerim Mrabti	Sweden	MF	2015–2018	77	18
Jonathan Augustinsson	Sweden	DF	2017-2020	77	3
Gary Williams	England		1978–1980; 1985–1986	77	3
Kim Källström	Sweden	MF	2001–2003; 2017	76	29
Nicklas Bärkroth	Sweden	MF	2018-2021	76	8
Alexander Faltsetas	Sweden	MF	2014–2016	76	3
Matias Concha	Sweden	DF	2004–2007	76	2
Leif Skiöld	Sweden	FW	1960–1965	75	60
Samuel Wowoah	Sweden		1999–2001; 2002–2004	75	22
Christer Youssef	Sweden	MF	2009–2013	75	10
Besard Sabovic	Sweden	MF	2016–2019; 2022-2025	74	6
Einar Hemming	Sweden			74	0
Piotr Johansson	Sweden	DF	2022-	74	0
Tommi Vaiho	Sweden	GK	2005-2013; 2017-2023	74	0
Lucas Nilsson	Sweden		1996–2000	73	21
Mikael Dahlberg	Sweden	FW	2007–2009	73	6
Simon Tibbling	Sweden	MF	2012–2015	73	3
Sharbel Touma	Sweden	MF	1995–1999; 2010–2011	72	14
Gustav Wikheim	Norway	MF	2022-	72	11
Per-Olof Erixon	Sweden		1973–1977	72	1
Kay Wieståhl	Sweden		1963–1967	71	25
Andrej Komac	Slovenia	MF	2006–2009	71	4
Michael Borgqvist	Sweden	MF	1997–1999	70	5
Peter Nymann	Denmark	MF	2011–2013	70	4
Jan Karlsson	Sweden	DF	1961–1965	70	2
Anders Almgren	Sweden	GK	1988–1992	70	0
Jörgen Lindman	Sweden		1974–1979	70	0
Arne Skotte	Sweden		1972–1974	69	11
Daniel Martinez	Sweden			69	10
Pierre Gallo	Sweden		1998–2000	68	16
Kalle Holmberg	Sweden	FW	2020-2022	68	14
Oskar Fallenius	Sweden	FW	2023-	68	5
Stefan Svensson	Sweden			66	0
Tobias Hysén	Sweden		2004–2006	65	17
Aslak Fonn Witry	Norway	DF	2019-2021	65	10
Lars Arnesson	Sweden		1960–1964	65	1
Kjell Frisk	Sweden	GK	1990–1995; 2001–2002	65	0
Stefan Bärlin	Sweden	MF	2000–2003	64	15
Lance Davids	South Africa	MF	2006–2008	64	6
Bjarne Redestad	Sweden			63	3
Åke Olsson	Sweden		1953–1957	63	1
Hans Stelius	Sweden			62	30
Kennedy Igboananike	Nigeria	FW	2007; 2010–2012	62	15
Edward Chilufya	Zambia	MF	2018-2021	62	11
Babis Stefanidis	Sweden	MF	2001–2004	62	8
Enrico	Brazil	MF	2005–2008	62	7
Jesper Löfgren	Sweden	DF	2021-2024	62	2
Jesper Arvidsson	Sweden	DF	2013–2015	61	6
Martin Broberg	Sweden	MF	2012–2015	61	5
Carl Karlstrand	Sweden			60	10
Jon Persson	Sweden			60	6
Johan Oremo	Sweden	FW	2008–2011	59	7
Ragnar Wicksell	Sweden			59	5
Jan Tauer	Germany	DF	2007–2009	59	2
Joel Riddez	Sweden	DF	1991–2001; 2011–2013	58	1
Peder Persson	Sweden		1964–1967	57	24
Thomas Johansson	Sweden	FW	1988–1989; 1993	57	11
Emmanuel Banda	Zambia	MF	2020-2022	57	9
Yussif Chibsah	Ghana	MF	2012–2014	57	0
Gunnar Persson	Sweden			57	0
Niklas Gunnarsson	Sweden	DF	2016-2018	55	2
Karl-Johan Tornborg	Sweden			55	0
Daniel Berntsen	Norway	MF	2015–2017	54	8
Stig Carlsson	Sweden			54	4
Jonas Granath	Sweden			53	1
Thiago Quirino	Brazil	FW	2006–2008	53	11
Prince Ikpe Ekong	Nigeria	MF	2008–2011	53	3
Erton Fejzullahu	Sweden	FW	2012–2014	52	23
Magnus Samuelsson	Sweden			52	3
Miro Tenho	Finland	DF	2024-	52	2
Stefan Bergtoft	Sweden	MF	2000–2006	52	1
Arne Blomqvist	Sweden			52	1
Tokmac Nguen	Norway	FW	2024-2025	51	15
Hjalmar Ekdal	Sweden	DF	2021-2022	50	7
Victor Jansson	Sweden			50	5
Gottfrid Johansson	Sweden			50	5
Darko Mavrak	Bosnia and Herzegovina	MF	1993–1995	50	1
Tino Kadewere	Zimbabwe	FW	2015–2018	48	13
Aliou Badji	Senegal	FW	2017-2018	48	11
Emir Kujović	Sweden	FW	2019-2021	48	9
Peter Mörk	Sweden			48	7
Sören Börjesson	Sweden	MF	1986–1987	47	11
Tim Björkström	Sweden	DF	2015–2017	47	0
Karl Gustafsson	Sweden			46	10
Louay Chanko	Sweden	MF	2000–2003	45	10
Roland Andersson	Sweden	DF	1975–1976	45	2
Mika Leinonen	Sweden			45	0
Daniel Nannskog	Sweden	FW	1997–1998	44	18
Tobias Gulliksen	Norway	MF	2024-2025	44	7
Omar Colley	Gambia	DF	2015–2016	44	5
René Makondele	DR Congo		2002–2005	44	5
Curtis Edwards	England	MF	2019-2021	44	4
Kristoffer Kindbom	Sweden			44	4
Richard Henriksson	Sweden			44	2
Stefan Karlsson	Sweden	DF	2014–2016	44	0
Berg	Sweden	DF	2019-2020	43	5
Peter Strömberg	Sweden			43	4
Patrik Haginge	Sweden	DF	2008–2011	43	3
Elias Andersson	Sweden	DF	2021-2023	43	2
Torsten Furukrantz	Sweden			43	0
Frithiof Rudén	Sweden			43	0
Othman El Kabir	Netherlands	MF	2016–2018	42	5
Yannick Bapupa	DR Congo	MF	2002–2004	42	3
Keita Kosugi	Japan	DF	2024-2025	42	1
Carl Andersson	Sweden			42	0
Gösta Backlund	Sweden			42	0
Arne Larsson	Sweden			42	0
Sam Johnson	Liberia	FW	2015–2016	41	27
Steve Galloway	England	FW	1988–1989	41	13
Bengt Garpe	Sweden			41	10
Niklas Karlström	Sweden		1989–1990	41	10
Hans Jonsson	Sweden	FW	1948–1951	41	7
Jonas Olsson	Sweden	DF	2017-2018	41	3
Stefan Batan	Sweden		2006–2009	41	2
Jani Lyyski	Finland	DF	2010–2012	41	0
Bertil Nordensköld	Sweden			40	5
Patrick Amoah	Sweden	FW	2004–2007	40	4
Evan Pettersson	Sweden			40	0
Rami Shaaban	Sweden	GK	2000–2002	40	0
Hasse Jeppson	Sweden	FW	1947–1949	39	35
Victor Edvardsen	Sweden	FW	2022-2023	39	11
Mats Aronsson	Sweden	FW	1981–1982	39	7
Arne Erlandsen	Norway	MF	1982–1983	38	6
Per Ferm	Sweden			38	6
Jan Andersson	Sweden			38	4
Patricio Cisternas	Sweden	DF	1998–1999	38	0
Ola Forsberg	Sweden			38	0
Sture Larsson	Sweden			37	12
Harry Sundberg	Sweden			37	7
Lucas Bergvall	Sweden	MF	2023-2024	37	5
Adam Ståhl	Finland	DF	2024-	37	4
Felix Beijmo	Sweden	DF	2017-2018	37	3
Hrvoje Milić	Croatia	MF	2009–2011	37	3
Kjell Cronqvist	Sweden			37	0
August Priske	Denmark	FW	2024-2025	35	18
Sebastian Andersson	Sweden	FW	2014–2016	35	13
Sölvi Ottesen	Iceland	DF	2004–2008	35	2
Kári Árnason	Iceland		2004–2006	35	0
Sten Söderberg	Sweden			34	11
Götrik Frykman	Sweden			34	6
Lars-Olof Sandberg	Sweden			34	6
Klebér Saarenpää	Sweden	DF	1995–1996	34	1
Daniel Amartey	Ghana	DF	2013–2014	34	0
Åke Rydberg	Sweden			33	14
Robert Eriksson	Sweden			33	9
Stig Andersson-Tvilling	Sweden		1947–1957	33	2
Joel Perovuo	Finland	MF	2010–2011	33	1
Albin Ekdal	Sweden	MF	2024-2025	33	0
Magnus Lindblad	Sweden			33	0
Christer Nordström	Sweden	MF	1983–1984	32	6
Stig Holmström	Sweden			32	1
Volker Tönsfeldt	Germany		1980–1982	32	0
Sune Andersson	Sweden	FW	1918–1919; 1921–1931	31	8
Vytautas Andriuškevičius	Lithuania	DF	2013–2014	31	0
Deniz Hümmet	Turkey	FW	2024-2025	30	14
Lennart Lundin	Sweden	FW	1983–1985	30	4
Astrit Ajdarević	Albania	MF	2019-2020	30	0
Jonas Claesson	Sweden		1988–1993	30	0
Mohamed Buya Turay	Sierra Leone	FW	2019	29	15
Carl Öhman	Sweden			29	8
Boris Johansson	Sweden		1964–1965	29	6
Christer Mattiasson	Sweden			29	4
Lars-Gunnar Rehnberg	Sweden		1971–1973	29	1
Elias Storm	Sweden			29	1
Matias Siltanen	Finland	MF	2025-	29	0
Lennart Forsberg	Sweden			28	14
Birger Danielsson	Sweden			28	6
Dženis Kozica	Sweden	MF	2018	28	3
Ivica Cvitkušic	Slovenia	DF	1992	28	1
Theo Bergvall	Sweden	DF	2023-2025	28	0
Per Kristian Bråtveit	Norway	GK	2019-2020	28	0
Samuel Dahl	Sweden	DF	2023-2024	28	0
Lars Lundborg	Sweden			28	0
Karl Schlaaf	Sweden			27	17
Michael Olunga	Kenya		2016	27	12
Anders Ahlström	Sweden		1972–1973	27	10
Aleksandar Prijović	Switzerland	FW	2013–2014	27	10
Patrik Hagman	Sweden		1989–1993	27	3
Jan Öhman	Sweden		1966–1968	27	1
Robert Stoltz	Sweden	DF	2005–2008	27	1
James Keene	England	FW	2012	26	6
Patric Åslund	Sweden	MF	2024-	26	4
Martin Åslund	Sweden	MF	1994–1996	26	1
Kjell Granqvist	Sweden	DF	1986–1987	26	1
Gustav Engvall	Sweden	FW	2017	25	8
Arne Bryngelsson	Sweden		1945–1947	25	6
Einar Olsson	Sweden			25	6
Mathias Ranégie	Sweden		2016	25	6
Ola Edlund	Sweden		1951–1956	25	2
Christer Bergqvist	Sweden	MF	1997–1998	25	1
Mattias Östberg	Sweden	DF	2012–2014	25	1
Marcus Hansson	Sweden	DF	2016-2017	25	0
