= 1989 Svenska Cupen final =

- Event: 1988–89 Svenska Cupen
Malmö FF	Djurgårdens IF
3	0
- Date: 29 June 1989
- Venue: Råsunda, Solna
- Referee: Erik Fredriksson (Tidaholm)
- Attendance: 7,526

The 1989 Svenska Cupen final took place on 29 June 1989 at Råsunda in Solna. The match was contested by Allsvenskan sides Malmö FF and Djurgårdens IF. Djurgården played their first final since 1975 and their third final in total, Malmö FF played their first final since 1986 and their 16th final in total. Malmö FF won their 14th title with a 3–0 victory.

== Match details ==
29 June 1989

Malmö FF	3–0	Djurgårdens IF
Nilsson 11'; Lindman 40'; Engqvist 53'

Råsunda, Solna
Attendance: 7,526
Referee: Erik Fredriksson (Tidaholm)

Malmö FF	Djurgården

MALMÖ FF:
GK	(Sweden) Jonnie Fedel
DF	(Sweden) Jean-Paul Vonderburg
DF	(Sweden) Per Ågren
DF	(Sweden) Roger Ljung
DF	(Sweden) Peter Jönsson
MF	(Sweden) Niclas Nyhlén
MF	(Sweden) Jonas Thern
MF	(Sweden) Stefan Schwarz
MF	(Sweden) Joakim Nilsson
FW	(Sweden) Leif Engqvist
FW	(Sweden) Håkan Lindman
Substitutes:
DF	(Sweden) Marcus Ekheim
FW	(Sweden) Martin Dahlin
Manager:
(England) Roy Hodgson

DJURGÅRDENS IF:
GK	(Sweden) Anders Almgren
DF	(Sweden) Glenn Schiller
DF	(Sweden) Stephan Kullberg
DF	(Sweden) Niklas Karlström
DF	(Sweden) Leif Nilsson
MF	(Sweden) Krister Nordin
MF	(Sweden) Stefan Rehn
MF	(Sweden) Jens Fjellström
MF	(Sweden) Kefa Olsson
FW	(England) Steve Galloway
FW	(Sweden) Glenn Myrthil	(substituted off) 83'
Substitutes:
FW	(Sweden) Peter Skoog	(substituted in) 83'
??	(Sweden) Lars Lundborg
Manager:
(Sweden) Tommy Söderberg
