= Lallerstedt =

Lallerstedt is a surname. Notable people with the surname include:

- Erik Lallerstedt (1946–2026), Swedish chef and resturateur
- Lars Lallerstedt (1938–2026), Swedish designer and industrial designer
