= St. Matthew's Church, Stockholm =

St. Matthew's Church
- S:t Matteus kyrka
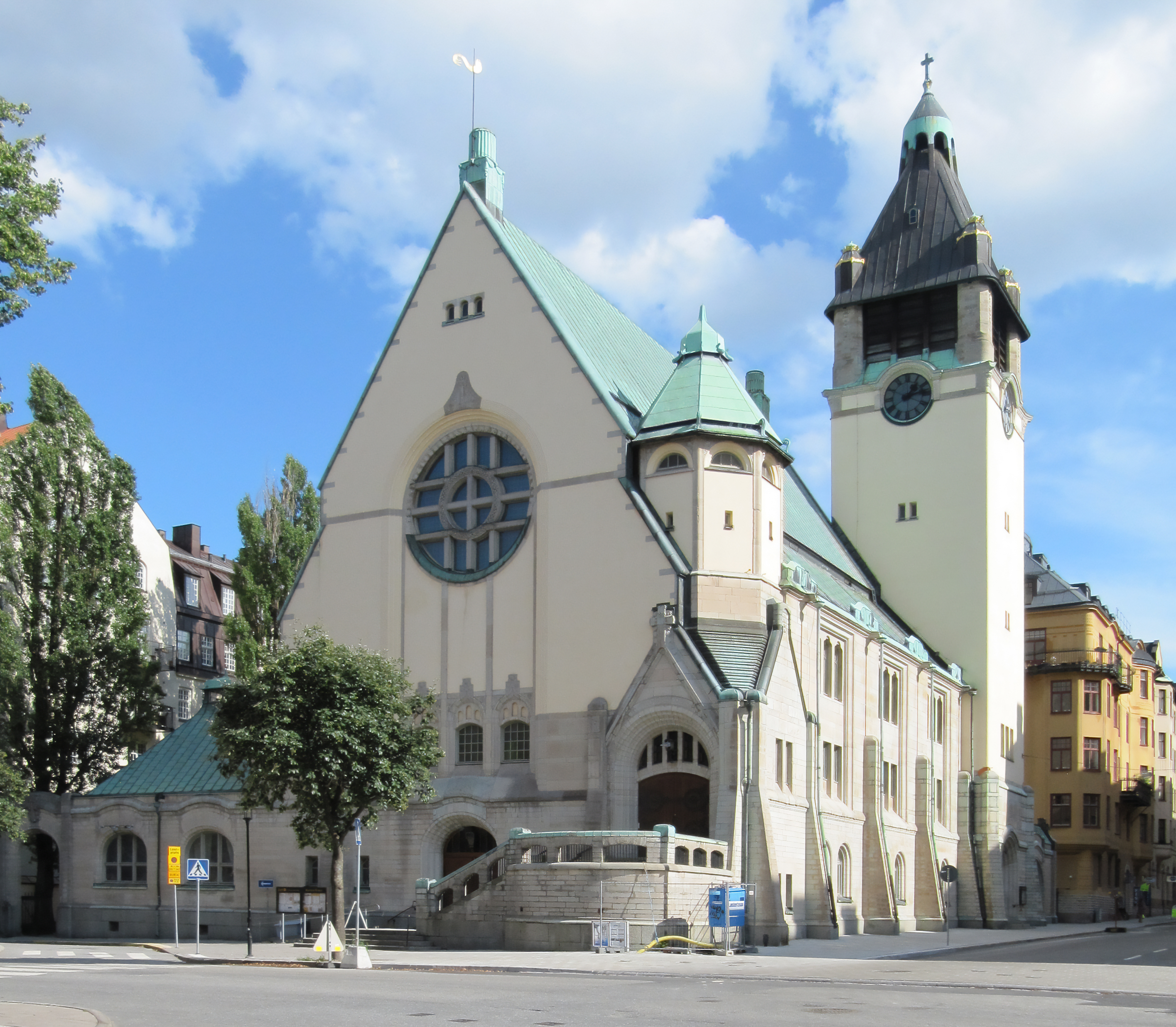
- St. Matthew's Church
- St. Matthew's Church
- 59°20′43″N 18°02′33″E
- Location: Vasastaden, Stockholm
- Country: Sweden
- Denomination: Church of Sweden
- Website: matteus.org

History
- Dedication: Saint Matthew the Evangelist

Architecture
- Architect: Erik Lallerstedt
- Style: Jugendstil
- Years built: 1901-1903

Administration
- Diocese: Diocese of Stockholm
- Parish: St. Matthew's Parish

St. Matthew's Church (Swedish: S:t Matteus kyrka) is a protected church located in the Vasastaden district of Stockholm, Sweden. Originally intended to be used as a chapel in the Adolf Fredrik Parish, it was designed by Erik Lallerstedt and built in 1901–1903, at an intersection in Vasastaden.

The large hall at ground floor was first meant to be used for various charitable activities, as the chapel was located in a poor working-class neighbourhood at the time. The building is reminiscent in many ways of St Peter's Church in Norrmalm, a Methodist church also designed by Lallerstedt in 1899. Some changes were made in 1907–1908, under guidance of the original architect, when the parish was split and the chapel was turned into a parish church.

== Gallery ==
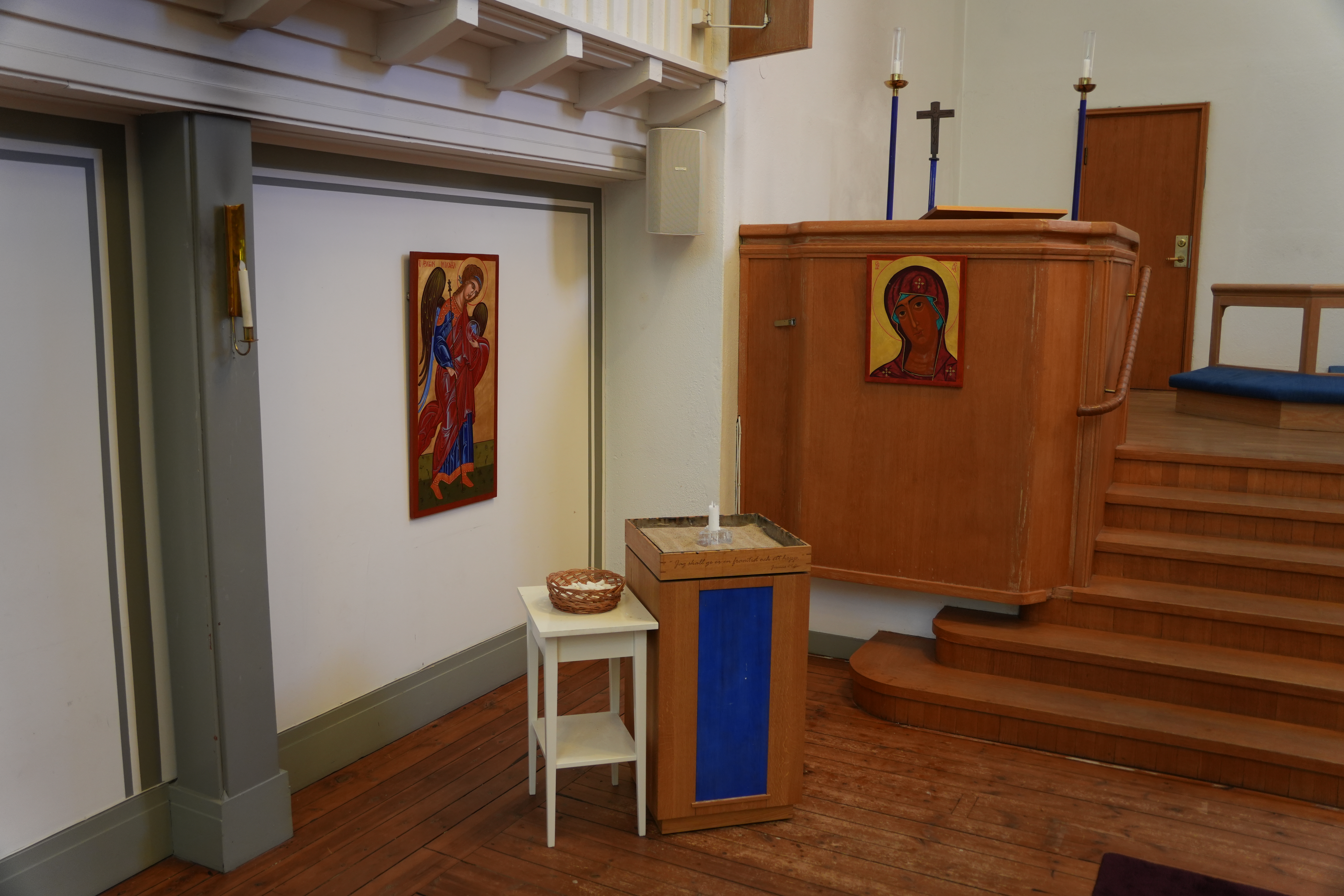
A prayer corner with icons and votive candles in Saint Michael's Chapel, located in the Evangelical-Lutheran parish of St. Matthew's Church

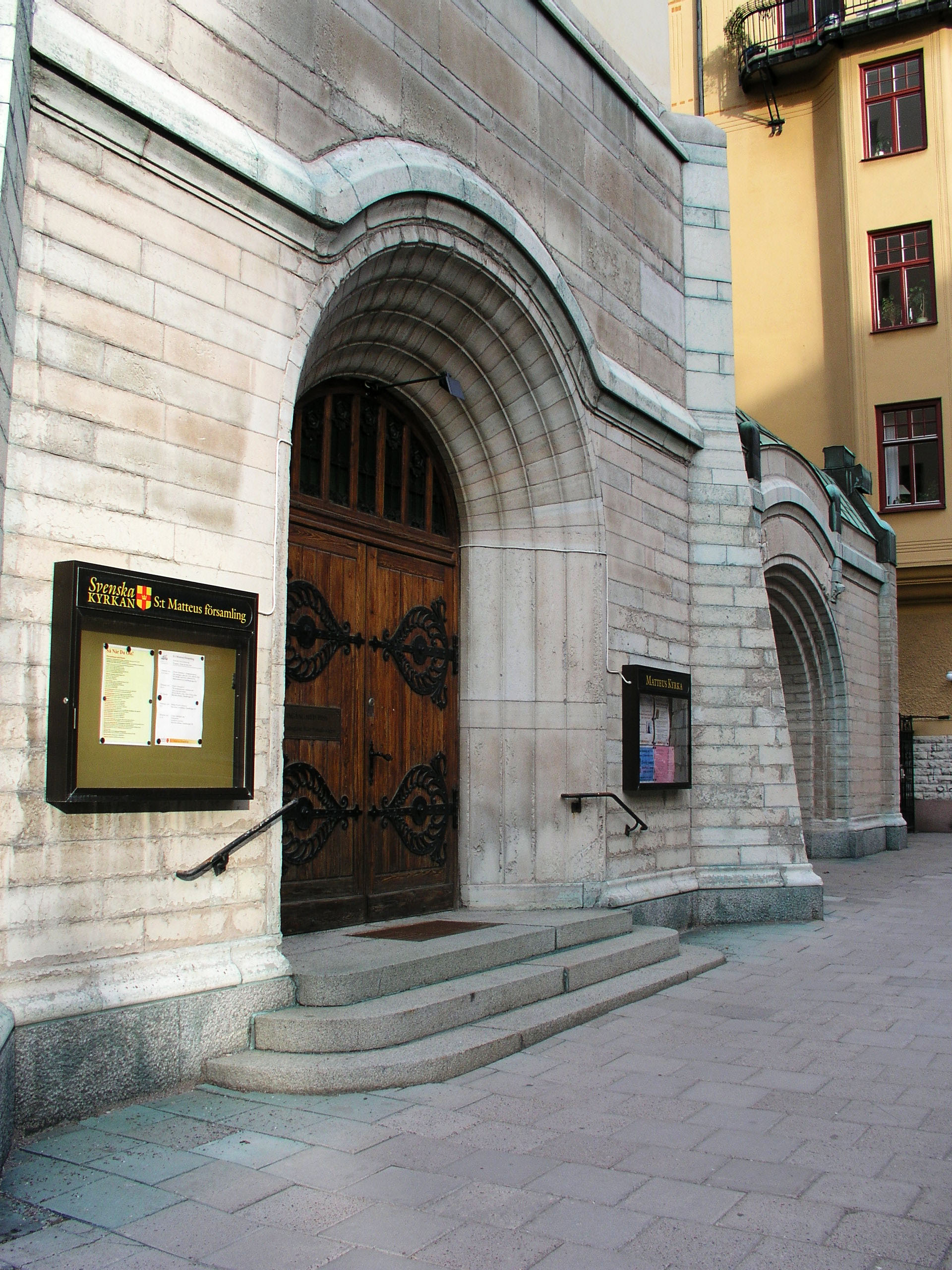
The entrance of St. Matthew's Church

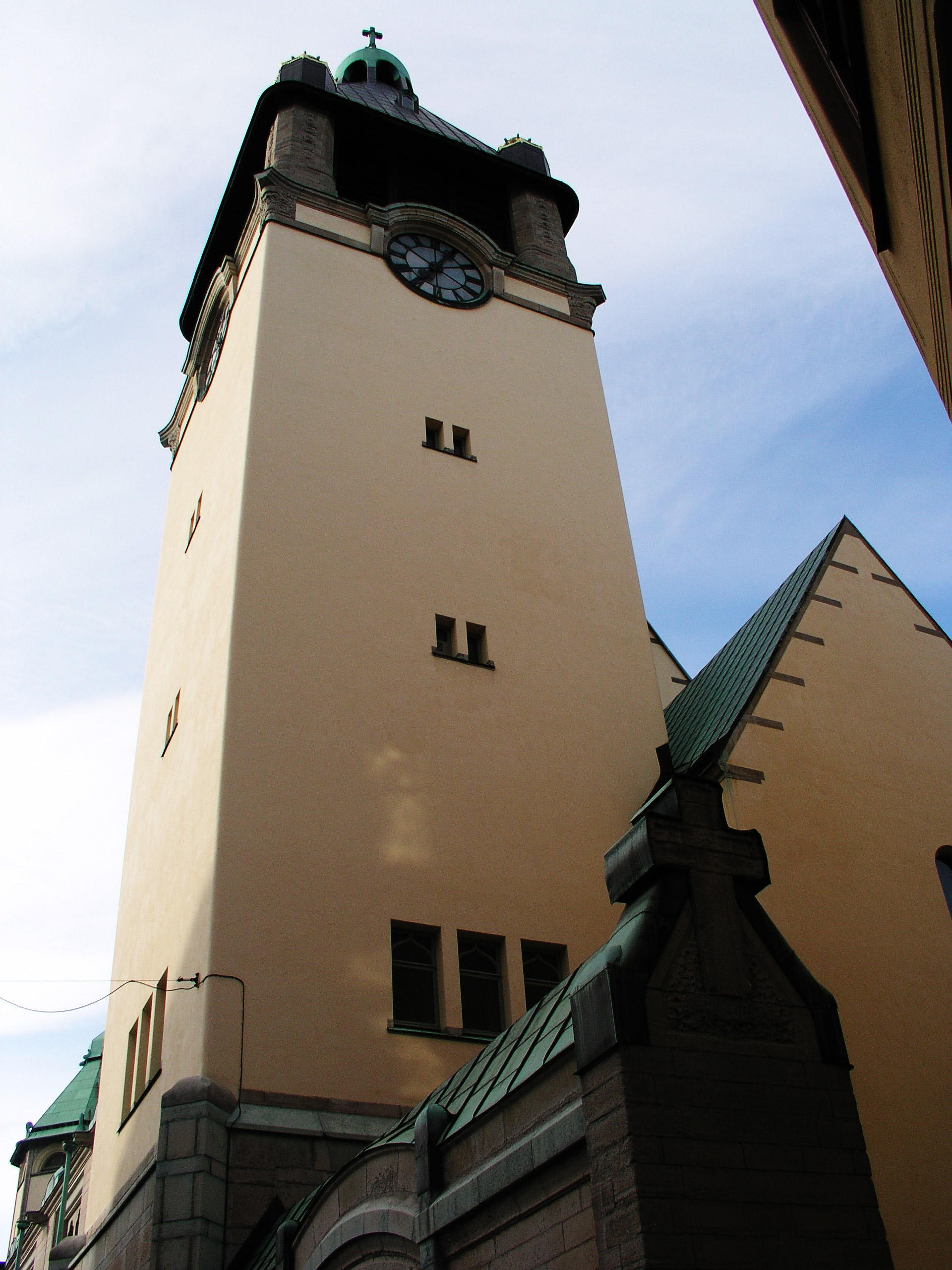
The bell tower of St. Matthew's Church

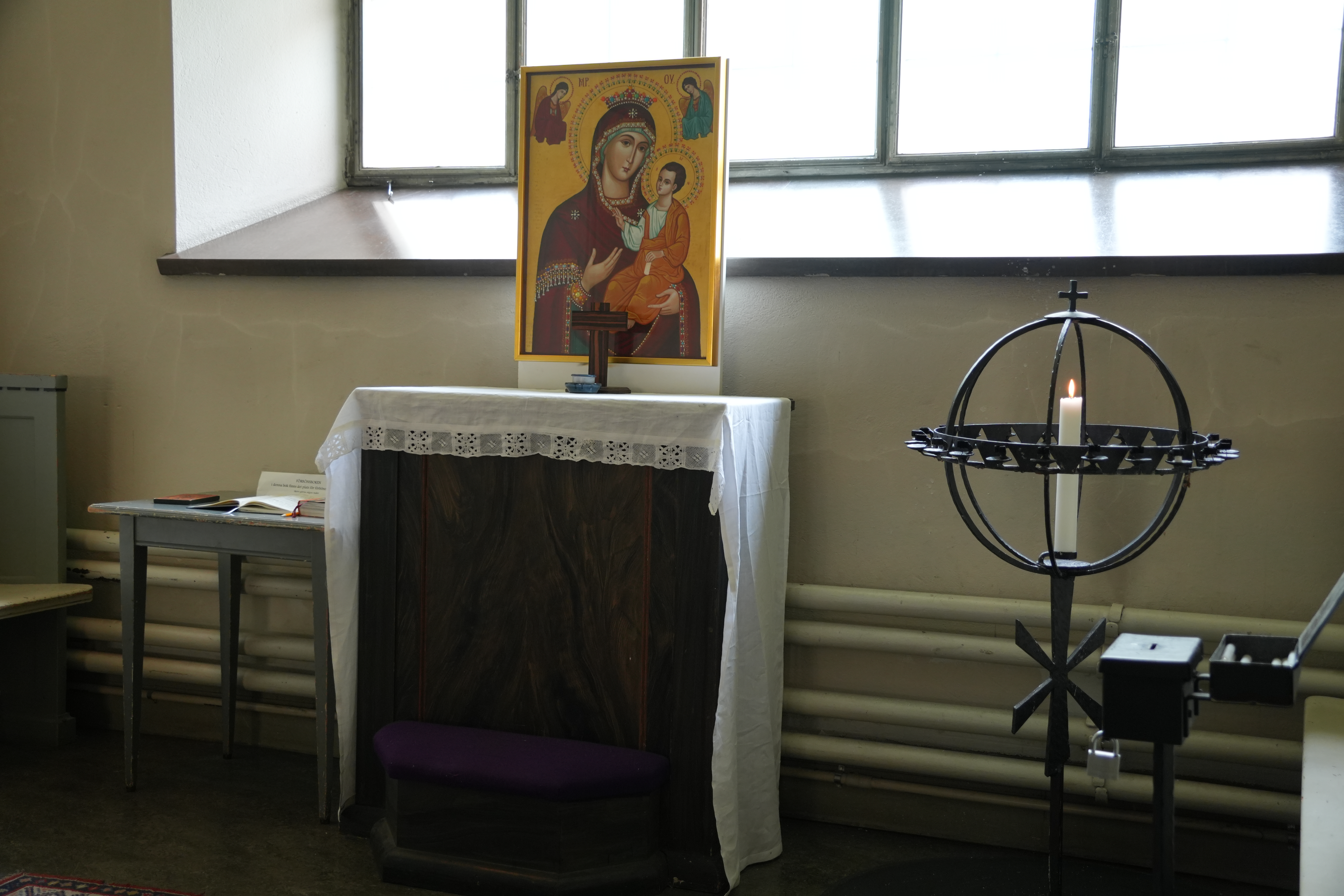
A bye-altar at St. Matthew's Evangelical-Lutheran Church with a votive candle rack

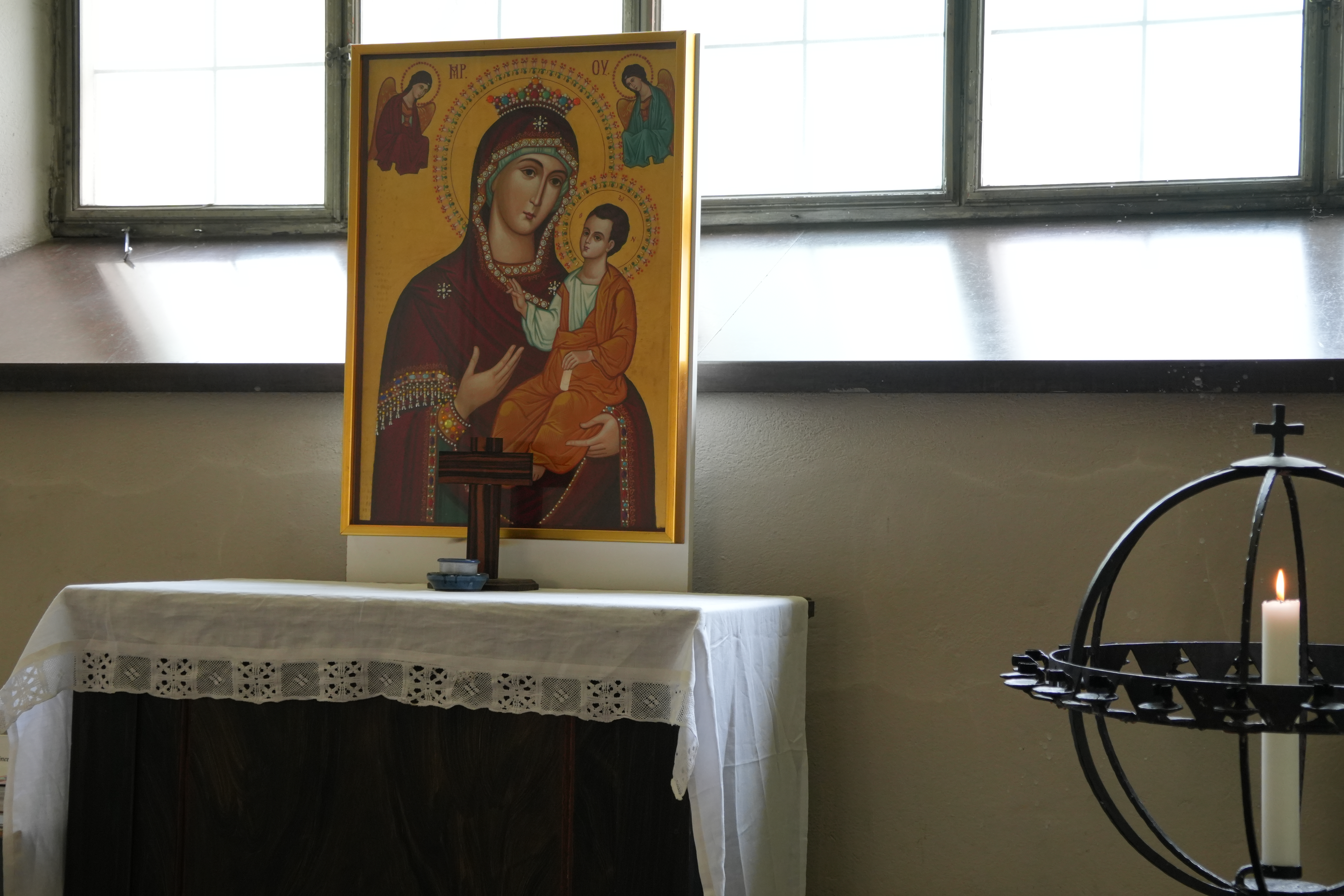
A icon of the Madonna and Child at St. Matthew's Church (Evangelical-Lutheran)

== See also ==
- List of churches in Stockholm
