= Burvall =

Burvall is a surname. Notable people with the surname include:

- Amy Burvall, American educator known for History for Music Lovers
- Anders Burvall (born 1964), Swedish sports shooter
- Ken Burvall (born 1966), Swedish footballer

== See also ==
- Burvill
