= Sture (name) =

Sture (stew-reh) is a masculine given name and a surname. It is of Swedish origin which is a derivative of the word stura meaning cross, grumpy, obstinate. Notable people with the name are as follows:

== Given name ==
=== First name ===
- Sture Allén (1928–2022), Swedish linguist
- Sture Andersson (born 1949), Swedish ice hockey player
- Sture Arntzen (born 1948), Norwegian trade unionist
- Sture Baatz (1929–2004), Swedish rower
- Sture Bergwall (born 1950), Swedish alleged serial killer
- Sture Björk, Swedish orienteering competitor
- Sture Bjørvig (born 1973), Norwegian rower
- Sture Bolin (1900–1962), Swedish historian
- Sture Christensson, Swedish sailor
- Sture Ericson (1912–1979), Swedish actor
- Sture Ericson (pentathlete) (1929–1990), Swedish pentathlete
- Sture Eskilsson (1930–2016), Swedish economist
- Sture Fladmark (born 1967), Norwegian football player and manager
- Sture Frölén (1907–1999), Swedish architect
- Sture Gillström (1908–1978), Swedish football, ice hockey and bandy player
- Sture Grahn (born 1932), Swedish skier
- Sture Hållberg (1917–1988), Swedish boxer
- Sture Henriksson (1917–1957), Swedish politician
- Sture Johnsson (born 1945), Swedish badminton player
- Sture Korpi (1939–2017), Swedish politician
- Sture Landqvist (1925–2016), Swedish athlete
- Sture Larsson (1919–2003), Swedish football and bandy player
- Sture Lindén (born 1942), Swedish curler
- Sture Lindquist (1910–1978), Swedish chess player
- Sture Ljungqvist (1921–2004), Swedish architect
- Sture Mårtensson (1916–2004), Swedish football player
- Sture Nordin (1933–2000), Swedish jazz bassist
- Sture Nordlund (1919–1973), Swedish sports shooter
- Sture Ohlin (1935–2023), Swedish athlete
- Sture Pettersson (1942–1983), Swedish cyclist
- Sture Sivertsen (born 1966), Norwegian skier
- Sture Sjöstedt (1916–2008), Swedish actor

=== Middle name ===
- Finn Sture Hultgreen (born 1949), Norwegian politician
- Kjell Sture Jensen (born 1968), Norwegian football player and manager
- Erik Sture Larre (1914–2014), Norwegian lawyer

== Surname ==
- Nils Sture, multiple people

== See also ==
- Sture, Swedish noble family
