= Immanuel Church, Stockholm =

Immanuel Church
- Immanuelskyrkan
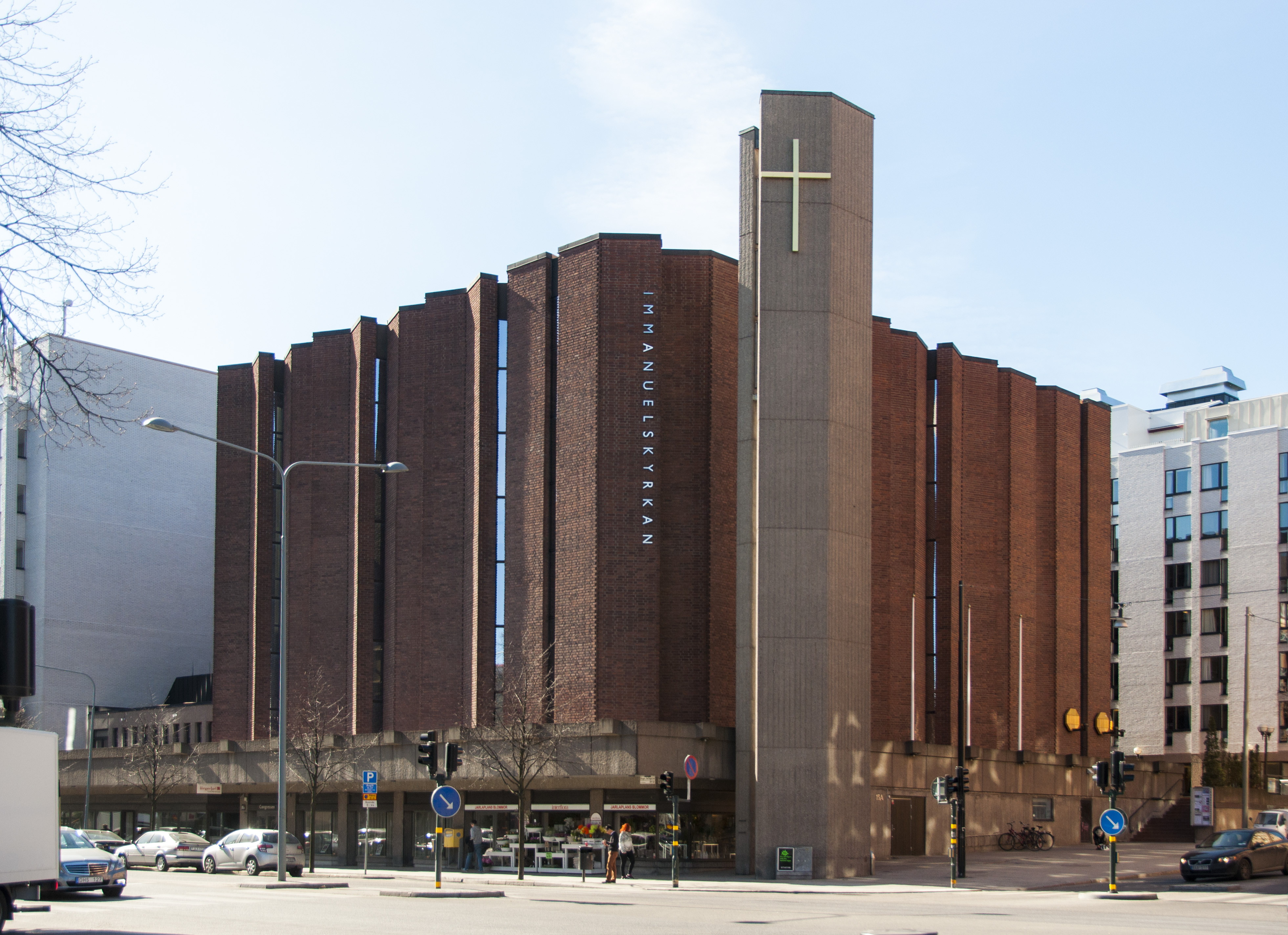
- Immanuel Church, January 2009
- Immanuel Church
- 59°20′33″N 18°03′48″E
- Location: Stockholm
- Country: Sweden
- Denomination: Evangelical, Uniting Church in Sweden
- Previous denomination: Mission Covenant Church of Sweden
- Website: immanuel.se

Architecture
- Architect: Sture Frölén
- Style: Modernist
- Completed: 1974

Immanuel Church (Swedish: Immanuelskyrkan) is church located in the city centre of Stockholm, Sweden. The church was designed by Sture Frölén and built in 1974 on a lot that used to house a tram depot, at the intersection of Birger Jarlsgatan and Kungstensgatan.

The entire block, containing offices and a hotel, was built in the years 1970–1974 on behalf of the church. The church has been considered a fine example of 1970s modernist architecture and is of great historical value, according to the Stockholm City Museum.

== See also ==
- List of churches in Stockholm
