= KTH Main Building =

Building in Stockholm, Sweden

- KTH:s huvudbyggnad
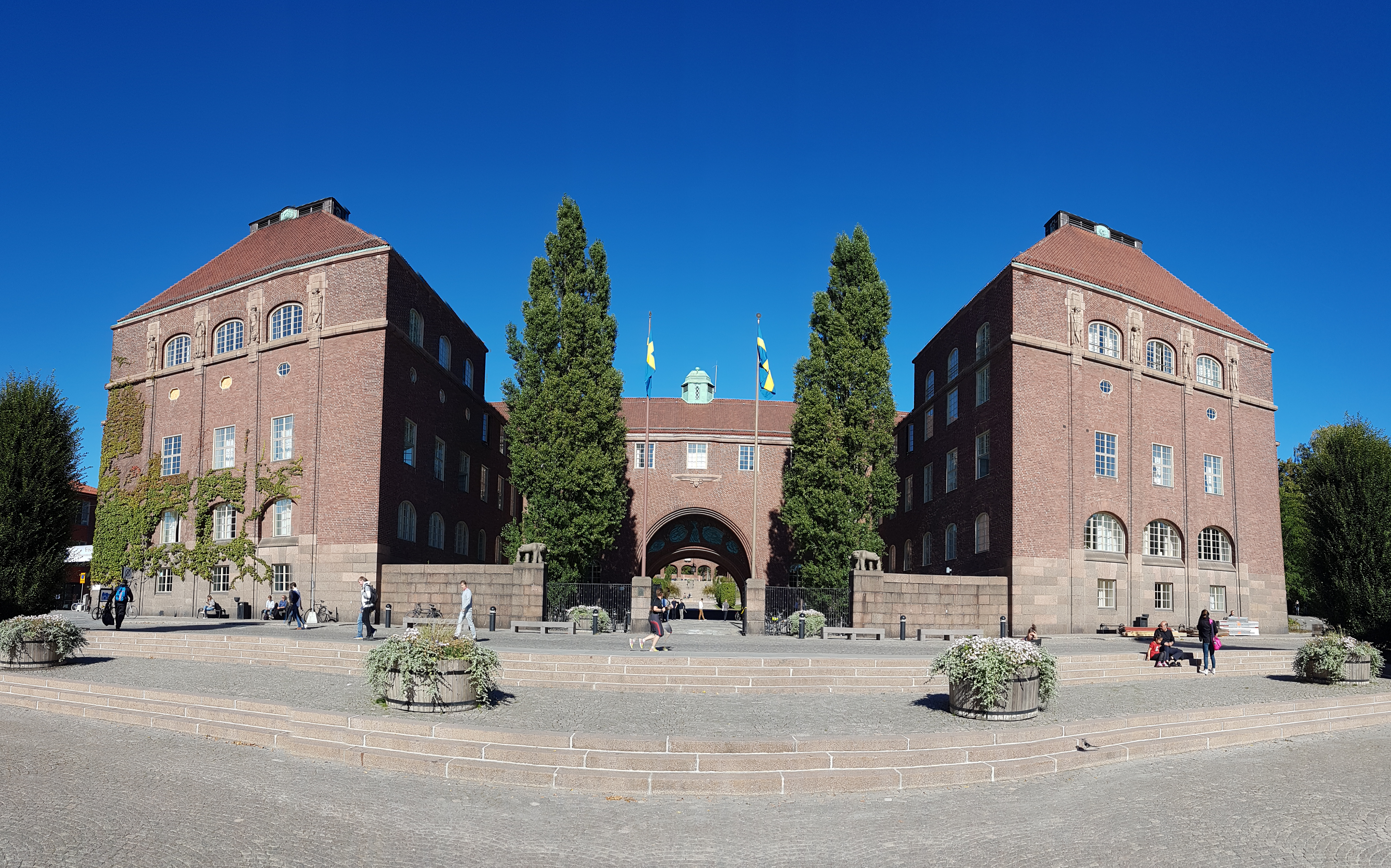
- The main building of the KTH Royal Institute of Technology
- Interactive map of the KTH Main Building area

General information
- Type: Building
- Location: 59°20′50″N 18°4′25″E, Sweden
- Opened: 1917
- Inaugurated: 19 October 1917
- Renovated: 1993–1996

Technical details
- Material: Bricks

Design and construction
- Architect: Erik Lallerstedt

Renovating team
- Architect: White

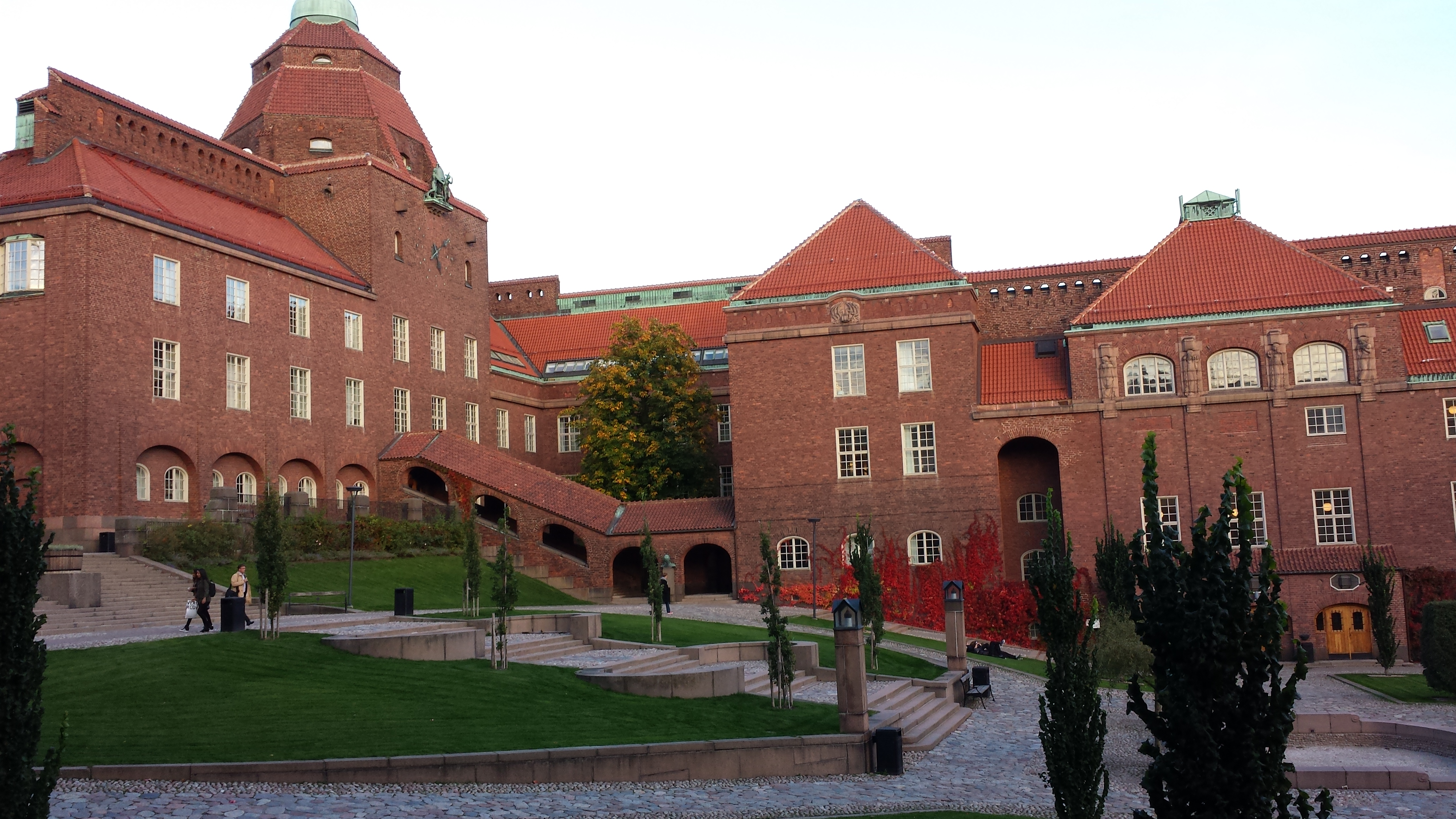
Main building, 2014

The main building of the KTH Royal Institute of Technology (KTH:s huvudbyggnad in Swedish) was designed by architect Erik Lallerstedt and inaugurated on 19 October 1917.

The building was renovated from 1993 to 1996.

In 2024, the building’s interior renovation was awarded the architectural prize Guldstolen.
