= Sture (disambiguation) =

Sture is the name of three distinct, but interrelated noble families in Sweden. It may also refer to:

- Sture (name), list of people with the name
- Sture murders, killing of Swedish nobles in 1567
- Sture Terminal, oil terminal in Norway
