= List of churches in Stockholm =

This is a list of churches in Stockholm, the capital of Sweden. The list does not include chapels or minor churches.

Churches in Stockholm County outside Stockholm municipality are listed in two separate lists: List of churches in Uppland and List of churches in Södermanland.

Note: in the list, "Year" denotes the year construction of the church was finished, when it was inaugurated, or the main construction period of the church.

== The list ==
Name	Year	Coordinates	Image	Notes
Adolf Fredrik Church	1774	59°20′16″N 18°03′37″E		Church of Sweden (Lutheran)
Bethlehem Church	1840 (new building 1956)	59°20′34″N 18°3′31″E		Swedish Evangelical Mission (Lutheran)
Bromma Church	12th century	59°21′15″N 17°55′14″E		Church of Sweden (Lutheran)
Engelbrekt Church	1914	59°20′39″N 18°04′04″E		Church of Sweden (Lutheran)
St Eric's Cathedral	1892	59°18′50″N 18°04′21″E		Catholic Church
St Eugenia's Church	1982	59°19′54″N 18°04′20″E		Catholic Church
Filadelfia Church	1930	59°20′22″N 18°02′04″E		Pentecostal
Finnish Church	1725	59°19′32″N 18°04′20″E		Church of Sweden (Lutheran); Finnish congregation
St George's Church (Swedish: Sankt Görans Kyrka)	1958	59°20′04″N 18°01′25″E		Church of Sweden (Lutheran)
St George's Greek Orthodox Cathedral	1874	59°20′46″N 18°3′46″E		Orthodox Church
German Church; St Gertrude's Church (Swedish: Sankta Gertruds Kyrka)	1580s	59°19′27″N 18°04′18″E		Church of Sweden (Lutheran); German congregation
Gustaf Adolf Church	1892	59°20′15″N 18°05′54″E		Church of Sweden (Lutheran)
Gustaf Vasa Church	1906	59°20′33″N 18°02′51″E		Church of Sweden (Lutheran)
Hedvig Eleonora Church	1737	59°20′07″N 18°04′50″E		Church of Sweden (Lutheran)
Hjorthagen Church	1909	59°21′17″N 18°06′12″E		Church of Sweden (Lutheran)
Högalid Church	1923	59°19′02″N 18°02′18″E		Church of Sweden (Lutheran)
Immanuel Church	1974	59°20′33″N 18°03′48″E		Uniting Church in Sweden
Saint James's Church (Swedish: Sankt Jacobs Kyrka)	construction of the present church started 1580	59°19′49″N 18°04′14″E		Church of Sweden (Lutheran)
St John's Church (Swedish: Sankt Johannes Kyrka)	1890	59°20′22″N 18°03′53″E		Catholic Church
Katarina Church	1724	59°19′01″N 18°04′41″E		Church of Sweden (Lutheran)
St Clare's Church (Swedish: Klara Kyrka)	1572	59°19′52″N 18°03′43″E		Church of Sweden (Lutheran)
Kungsholms Church	1688	59°19′44″N 18°02′55″E		Church of Sweden (Lutheran)
Maria Magdalena Church	construction of the present church started 1588	59°19′08″N 18°41′01″E		Church of Sweden (Lutheran)
St Matthew's Church (Swedish: Sankt Matteus Kyrka)	1903	59°20′43″N 18°02′33″E		Church of Sweden (Lutheran)
Oscar's Church	1903	59°20′00″N 18°05′36″E		Church of Sweden (Lutheran)
St Peter's Church	1901	59°20′14″N 18°03′15″E		Uniting Church in Sweden
St Peter and St Sigfrid's Church	1866 (relocated to present site 1913)	59°19′57.5″N 18°6′8.5″E		Anglican (Church of England); Dedicated to Saint Peter and Saint Sigfridvende
Riddarholm Church	late 13th century	59°19′29″N 18°03′53″E		Catholic Museum and Event venue
Royal Chapel	1754	59°19′35″N 18°04′21″E		Church of Sweden (Lutheran); Located within Stockholm Palace
St Sava's Church	1991	59°17′22″N 18°3′42″E		Orthodox Church
St Sergius' Church	19th century	Built originally as a Catholic Apostolic Church, it has been Greek Orthodox since 197059°19′6″N 18°3′58″E		Orthodox Church
Skeppsholmen Church	1849	59°19′35″N 18°04′55″E		Church of Sweden (Lutheran) but no longer in use as a church
Sofia Church	1906	59°18′44″N 18°05′18″E		Church of Sweden (Lutheran)
Spånga Church	c. 1175-1200	59°23′29″N 17°54′43″E		Church of Sweden (Lutheran)
St Stephen's Church (Swedish: Sankt Stefans Kyrka or Stefanskyrkan)	1904	59°20′51″N 18°03′16″E		Church of Sweden (Lutheran)
Stockholm Cathedral (Storkyrkan)	13th century	59°19′33″N 18°04′14″E		Church of Sweden (Lutheran)
