= Burvill =

Burvill is a surname. Notable people with the surname include:

- Cliff Burvill (1937–2021), Australian cyclist
- Glenn Burvill (born 1962), English footballer
- Margaret Burvill (1941–2009), Australian athlete

== See also ==
- Burvall
- Alice Burville
