= Spånga Church =

Coordinates: 59°23′29.5″N 17°54′43″E

- Spånga kyrka
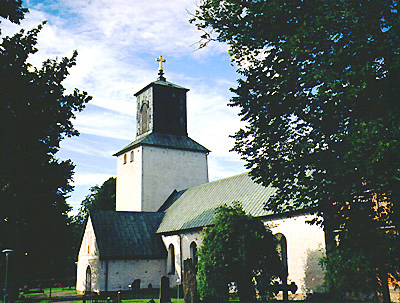
- Spånga Church
- Spånga Church
- Location: Spånga
- Country: Sweden
- Denomination: Church of Sweden
- Previous denomination: Roman Catholic

History
- Consecrated: 12th century

Administration
- Diocese: Stockholm
- Parish: Spånga-Kista

Spånga Church (Swedish: Spånga kyrka) is a church in the Spånga-Tensta borough in Stockholm, Sweden. It is part of Spånga-Kista Parish in the Diocese of Stockholm. The oldest part of the church originates from 1175–1200. Large reconstructions and enhancements took place during the 14th and 15th centuries.

Baron Gustaf Bonde (1620–1667), owner of the nearby Hässelby Palace, made considerable donations to the church. After his death a chancel tomb, designed by the architect Nicodemus Tessin the Elder, was added onto the church, in which he and his descendants are buried. The church also contains other historical monuments, such as several fresco paintings from the Middle Ages. The church was last renovated between 1953 and 1955.

== Paintings ==
The first church paintings are probably from the 14th century, when the long nave was built. These were mostly abstract decorations, geometrical patterns and ornaments. Paintings from the early 15th century are interpreted as biblical motifs from the Old Testament, the prophets Elijah and Elisha, but with landscapes, houses, clothing and tools common at the time of painting. The name(s) of the painter(s) from this period are not known. In the late 15th century the triumphal arch was set up, as well as a new choir, and paintings from this period are of a different style, with motives from both the Old and New Testament, as well as later saints.

During a church restoration in 1789 all paintings were covered with white paint. The interior walls remained white until a new restoration around 1900 was undertaken. This restoration was quite rough, and the walls were repainted. In the 1950s the walls underwent a new restoration, which aimed to bring forth some of the original medieval paintings that had been covered 160 years earlier.

== Runestone ==
Three Viking Age runestones stand outside the church. There are also several fragments of runestones inside the church. One of the runestones is designated as U 61 in Rundata and is made of granite. On one side the stone has a runic inscription within bands with an interior Christian cross design, and on the other side it has a second cross. It is classified as being carved in runestone style RAK, which is the oldest style. This classification is used for those inscriptions where the runic text band ends are straight and do not have any attached serpent or animal heads. The runic inscription for stylistic reasons has been attributed to a runemaster named Gunnar. Other runestones are also attributed to this runemaster and he signed the runic inscription U 226 at Arkils tingstad.

Of the personal names mentioned in the inscription, Þorbiorn or Þorbjôrn means 'Thor's Bear', Gunnbiorn or Gunnbjôrn means 'Battle Bear', Halfdan means 'Half Dane', Ulf or Ulfr means 'Wolf', and Biorn or Bjôrn means 'Bear'.

=== Inscription ===
A transliteration of the runic inscription to Roman letters is:

hialmuiþ(r) : auk : þurbiarn : kunbiarn : auk : halftan : þais : raistu : stin : þina : eftiʀ : bruþur : sin : ulf : auk : faþur : sen biarn : auk : bruþur : sen : blakari

A transcription into Old Norse is:

hialmuiþ auk þurbiarn kunbiarn auk halftan þais raistu stin þina eftir bruþur sin ulf auk faþur sen biarn auk bruþur sen blakari

A translation into English is:

Hialmviðr and Þorbiorn, Gunnbiorn and Halfdan raised this stone after (in memory of) their brother Ulf and their father Biorn and their brother Blakare.

== Notable events ==
In 1901, Spånga Church was one of two churches designated control points for the first-ever public orienteering competition held in Sweden.

On August 26, 1974, Arne Domnérus, playing saxophone, and Gustav Sjökvist, playing organ, recorded their highly-acclaimed album, Antiphone Blues, in this church.

== See also ==
- List of churches in Stockholm
