= St. Peter's Church, Stockholm =

St. Peter's Church
- S:t Peters kyrka
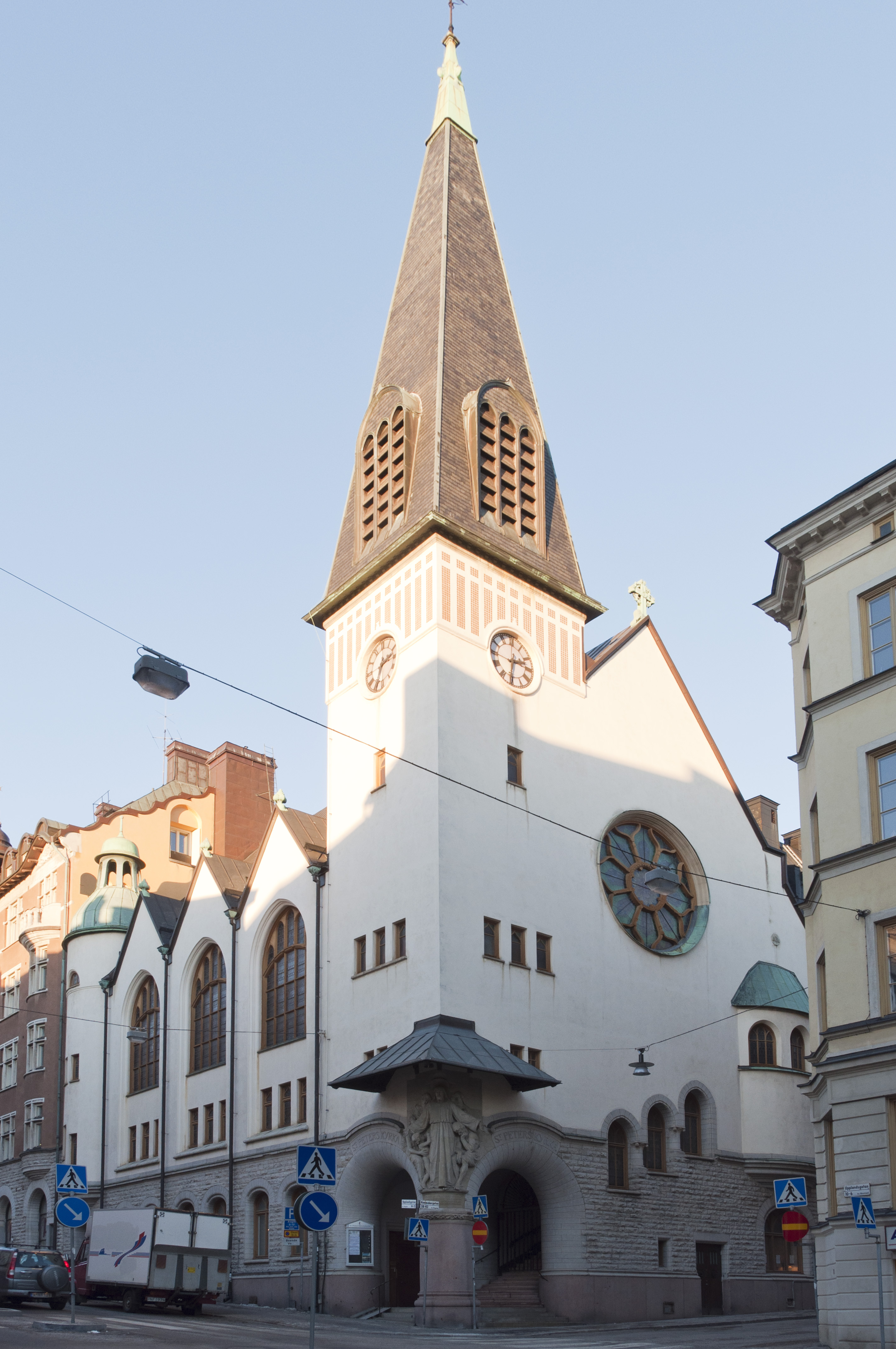
- St. Peter's Church
- St. Peter's Church
- 59°20′14″N 18°03′15″E
- Location: Norrmalm, Stockholm
- Country: Sweden
- Denomination: Evangelical, Uniting Church in Sweden
- Previous denomination: United Methodist Church of Sweden
- Website: stpeterskyrka.se

Architecture
- Architect: Erik Lallerstedt
- Style: Jugendstil
- Years built: 1900-1901

Administration
- Parish: St. Peter's Parish

St. Peter's Church (Swedish: Sankt Peterskyrkan) is church located in the Norrmalm district of Stockholm, Sweden. It was designed by Erik Lallerstedt and built in the Art Nouveau style 1900–1901.

== See also ==
- List of churches in Stockholm
