= Lars Lallerstedt =

Swedish industrial designer (1938–2026)

Lars Lallerstedt (5 June 1938 – 28 February 2026) was a Swedish designer and industrial designer, who was considered a pioneer in the discipline within Sweden. Grandson of professor Erik Lallerstedt, son of architect Lars-Erik Lallerstedt and brother of Erik Lallerstedt, Swedish chef and restaurateur.

Lallerstedt was active in a number of different areas: design concepts for barn constructions for Alfa Laval since 1984, medical appliances, consumer products, hi-fi systems, telephones, radio and telecommunication equipment, open stoves etc. He was engaged by Sonab 1969–74 and designed minimalistic loud-speakers and amplifiers with a trend-setting character.

He was among those who founded the industrial design education at the University College of Arts, Crafts and Design (Konstfack) in Stockholm, where he lectured since 1976. He was the first professor in industrial design in Sweden, 1986–92, and the head of Konstfack 1999–2003.

Lallerstedt was engaged in the Stockholm School of Entrepreneurship, a cooperation organization between different educations in Stockholm. He has designed several exhibitions, such as the Design: Stockholm at the Stockholms Stadsmuseum and the world's largest design archive, created by the center for business and industry history in Stockholm och Svensk Form.

Lallerstedt died on 28 February 2026, at the age of 87.
