= Amy Burvall =

American educator

Amy Burvall is an American educator known for her innovative teaching videos produced jointly with her colleague Herb Mahelona which describe historical events in song to the soundtrack of pop music hits. The videos were originally produced just for school use but have been viewed over one million times since they began to be published on YouTube.

== Career ==
Burvall received her BA summa cum laude in humanities from Hawaii Loa College (now Hawaii Pacific University) in 1991. She studied European history at the University of Hawaii at Manoa. She worked as a history teacher at St Andrew's Priory school in Honolulu (2000–2008) and then at Le Jardin Academy International in Kailua, Hawaii. She comes from a family of teachers but says, "I didn't always want to be a teacher. I wanted to be a spy — with all of my costumes you can probably see why." She credits her interest in combining music and learning to the influence of television programs she watched as a child such as Sesame Street and Schoolhouse Rock!

== History for Music Lovers ==
Around 2004, while she was working at St Andrew's Priory school, Burvall came up with the idea of setting historical facts to the tunes of pop songs in order to provide an aide-memoire for her pupils at the end of a course. The first songs she created specifically for her history teaching were Civilization, to the soundtrack of Gwen Stefani's "Harajuku Girls", and Henry VIII to ABBA's "Money, Money, Money". Both were composed after Burvall heard the songs repeatedly in her car. She originally planned to sing to her students but her colleague at St Andrews, Herb Mahelona, a musician and expert in Flash animation, suggested that they create a video to accompany each song. In January 2010, they began to publish the videos on YouTube as part of a series titled History for Music Lovers, under the "historyteachers" username. They have since produced over 50 videos which have had more than one million views on YouTube.

Not long after the first video went online, Burvall was diagnosed with breast cancer. Her chemotherapy treatment caused her to lose her hair, which she explained was the reason why she used so many wigs in her videos, and caused insomnia which gave her plenty of time to work on new compositions. She has described how the whole project served as an escape from the worries of her illness. Her cancer has since entered remission and her hair has grown back.

The videos mostly relate to pre-1900 European history as that is Burvall's area of interest. She has been asked to create videos about American history but says "it's hard to write something in a forced way." Burvall says that her songs are not meant to replace more detailed instruction; rather, they are a survey of the main points and vocabulary of a topic in a catchy but factually accurate way with a little artistic licence over the exact wording.

Renee Hobbs and David Cooper Moore in Discovering Media Literacy: Teaching Digital Media and Popular Culture in Elementary School say "Many educators have benefited from the work of these remarkable teachers" while learning technologist Steve Wheeler pays tribute to their ability to "represent vivid moments in history through music, animation and drama".

== Other activities ==
Burvall taught theory of knowledge at Le Jardin Academy until November 2014 and is currently freelancing as learning and creativity consultant, graphic recorder and professional speaker. She is also a Google Education certified innovator, TEDx speaker, and Mozilla fellow. She gave the keynote speech for the third annual eLearning Strategies Symposium and was co-curator for TEDxHonoluluED 2013.

== Selected publications ==
- Intention: Critical Creativity in the Classroom. EdTechTeam, 2017. (With Dan Ryder) ISBN 978-1945167324

== See also ==
- Khan Academy
