= Ola Forsberg =

Swedish footballer

Personal information
- Date of birth: 7 December 1930
- Date of death: 17 January 2018 (aged 87)
- Position: Right back

Senior career*
Years	Team	Apps	(Gls)
1955–1958	Djurgården	38	(0)
- * Club domestic league appearances and goals

Ola Forsberg (1930 – 2018) was a Swedish footballer (right back). Between 1955 and 1958, Forsberg made 38 Allsvenskan appearances for Djurgården and scored 0 goals.
