= Arne Blomqvist =

Swedish footballer (1921–2009)

Personal information
- Full name: Arne Edvard Blomqvist
- Date of birth: 13 July 1921
- Place of birth: Örnsköldsvik, Sweden
- Date of death: 22 April 2009 (aged 87)
- Position: Defender

Senior career*
Years	Team	Apps	(Gls)
	Djurgården	52	(1)
- * Club domestic league appearances and goals

Arne Edvard Blomqvist (13 July 1921 – 22 April 2009) was a Swedish footballer who played as a defender. He made 52 Allsvenskan appearances for Djurgården scoring 1 goal. Blomqvist died on 22 April 2009, at the age of 87.
