= Bengt Garpe =

Swedish footballer

Personal information
- Date of birth: 1 March 1916
- Position: Forward

Senior career*
Years	Team	Apps	(Gls)
- IFK Västerås
1935–1948	Djurgården		
- * Club domestic league appearances and goals

Bengt Oskar Gabriel Garpe (born 1 March 1916) is a Swedish retired football forward.

Originally from IFK Västerås, Garpe joined Djurgården in 1935 and played there until 1948. He was the internal top scorer in the 1943–44 season. Not all years in the Swedish top-flight Allsvenskan, Garpe made 41 top-tier appearances for Djurgården and scored 10 goals.
