= Ola Edlund =

Swedish footballer

Senior career*
Years	Team	Apps	(Gls)
- Djurgården
- * Club domestic league appearances and goals

Ola Edlund is a Swedish retired footballer. Edlund made 25 Allsvenskan appearances for Djurgården and scored 2 goals.
