= Svante Mjörne =

Swedish footballer

Personal information
- Full name: Svante Per Eric Mjörne
- Date of birth: 13 March 1958 (age 68)
- Place of birth: Sweden
- Position: Midfielder

Youth career
- IFK Västerås

Senior career*
Years	Team	Apps	(Gls)
- IFK Västerås
- Essinge IK
1983–1987	Djurgårdens IF	95	(12)
- Spårvägens FF
- * Club domestic league appearances and goals

Svante Per Eric Mjörne (born 13 March 1958) is a Swedish former footballer who played as a midfielder, most notably for Djurgårdens IF.

== Career ==
=== Early career ===
Mjörne started his career with IFK Västerås before signing with Essinge IK in the early 1980s.

=== Djurgårdens IF ===
Mjörne represented Djurgårdens IF between 1983 and 1987 and appeared in a total of 95 league games and scored 12 goals. His most notable performance came in 1985 when he helped Djurgården win promotion from Division 2 Norra to Allsvenskan. In the second leg of the 1985 Allsvenskan promotion play-off against GAIS, Mjörne assisted Teddy Sheringham's 1–1 equaliser in extra time which took the game into a penalty shootout which Djurgården won.

During the 1986 Allsvenskan season, Mjörne made 12 league appearances and scored two goals as Djurgården finished last and was relegated to Division 1 Norra.

=== Spårvägens FF ===
Mjörne finished his career with Spårvägens FF, signing for the club in 1989 and helping them win the 1989 Division 2 Norra league title.

== Honours ==
Djurgårdens IF

- Division 1 Norra: 1987
- Division 2 Norra: 1985

Spårvägens FF

- Division 2 Norra: 1989
