= Gunnar Persson (footballer) =

Swedish footballer

Senior career*
Years	Team	Apps	(Gls)
- Djurgården
- * Club domestic league appearances and goals

Gunnar Persson is a Swedish retired footballer. Persson made 57 Allsvenskan appearances for Djurgården and scored no goals.
