= Steve Wheeler =

Steve Wheeler (born 16 June 1957) is a British academic, author, speaker and learning technologist.

== Early life ==
Wheeler was born in Devonport, a suburb of Plymouth, England. His father was in the Royal Air Force, and due to constant travelling, Wheeler attended a number of schools across Europe, including St George's School in Gibraltar; Sandwick School in the Shetland Isles, Scotland; Wellington Grammar School in Telford, England; and the AFCENT International School in Brunssum, the Netherlands. He also attended Hereford College of Art and Design, where he studied fine arts, graphic design and photography.

== Academic career ==
Wheeler is an Education Consultant and was formally a lecturer in Information & Computer Technology in the Plymouth Institute of Education at Plymouth University where he taught on a number of undergraduate and postgraduate teacher education programmes. He is a visiting professor at the Technical University of Liberec ( Neisse University), in the Czech Republic. Prior to joining the university he worked in the National Health Service and as a lecturer in education at City College Plymouth. Wheeler researches into the uses of Web 2.0 in all education sectors, and has published more than 150 scholarly articles in the field of e-learning. Wheeler has also published 5 books and numerous monograms related to the use of learning technology and innovative pedagogy. Wheeler earned his Cert Ed teaching qualification at Polytechnic Southwest, his first degree in Psychology via part-time study at the British Open University and later completed a Master of Philosophy degree at the University of Plymouth. In 2008 Wheeler was awarded a Fellowship by the European Distance and E-learning Network (EDEN) for his services to European educational research and a Senior Fellowship in 2017. Wheeler is an active edublogger and his writings regularly appear on his blog Learning with 'e's.

Between 2008 and 2011 Wheeler was co-editor of the journal Interactive Learning Environments, and served on the editorial boards of a number of other academic journals including ALT-J - Research in Learning Technology, the International Review of Research in Open and Distance Learning, and Digital Culture and Education. Wheeler was elected as Chair of the IFIP Technical Committee Group 3.6 (Distance Education) in 2008. He was also the chair of the Plymouth e-Learning Conference, rebranded in 2012 as 'PELeCON' at the University of Plymouth, United Kingdom; an international event that was held every year on the University of Plymouth campus from 2006 to 2013.

== Bibliography ==
- Toward the Virtual University (2003) ISBN 1-931576-92-0
- Transforming Primary ICT (2005) ISBN 1-84445-024-4
- The Digital Classroom: Harnessing Technology for the Future (2008) ISBN 978-1-84312-445-0
- Connected Minds, Emerging Cultures: Cybercultures in Online Learning (2009) ISBN 978-1-60752-015-3
- Learning with 'e's: Educational Theory and Practice in the Digital Age (2015) ISBN 978-1-84590-939-0
- Digital Learning In Organization (2019) ISBN 978-0-7494-8468-2
