= Mats Jansson (footballer) =

Swedish footballer

Personal information
- Date of birth: 9 May 1961 (age 65)

Youth career
- Djurgården

Senior career*
Years	Team	Apps	(Gls)
1981–1985	Djurgården	83	(7)
- * Club domestic league appearances and goals

Mats Jansson (born 9 May 1961) is a Swedish former footballer. Jansson made 12 Allsvenskan appearances for Djurgården and scored 0 goals. Jansson played with Djurgården from 1981 to 1985, making 83 appearances and scoring 7 goals for the club in total.
