= Stig Holmström =

Swedish footballer

Senior career*
Years	Team	Apps	(Gls)
- Djurgården
- * Club domestic league appearances and goals

Stig Holmström is a Swedish retired footballer. Holmström made 32 Allsvenskan appearances for Djurgården and scored one goal.
