= Lars-Gunnar Rehnberg =

Swedish footballer

Senior career*
| Years | Team | Apps | (Gls) |
- Djurgården
- * Club domestic league appearances and goals

Lars-Gunnar Rehnberg is a Swedish retired footballer. Rehnberg made 29 Allsvenskan appearances for Djurgården and scored 1 goal.
