= Stefan Svensson (footballer) =

Swedish footballer

Personal information
- Full name: Bengt Stefan Svensson
- Date of birth: 18 January 1958 (age 68)

Senior career*
Years	Team	Apps	(Gls)
1983–1986	Djurgården	70	(0)
- * Club domestic league appearances and goals

Stefan Svensson (born 18 January 1958) is a Swedish retired footballer. Svensson made seven Allsvenskan appearances for Djurgården and scored no goals.
