= Peter Jönsson =

Swedish footballer

Personal information
- Full name: Peter Jönsson
- Date of birth: 11 February 1965 (age 61)
- Position: Defender

Senior career*
Years	Team	Apps	(Gls)
1986–1993	Malmö FF	56	(4)
- * Club domestic league appearances and goals

Peter Jönsson (born 11 February 1965) is a Swedish former footballer who played as a defender.
