= Karl-Johan Tornborg =

Swedish footballer

Senior career*
Years	Team	Apps	(Gls)
- Djurgården
- * Club domestic league appearances and goals

Karl-Johan Tornborg is a Swedish retired footballer. Tornborg made 55 Allsvenskan appearances for Djurgården and scored 0 goals.
