= Nils Sture =

Nils Sture may refer to:

- Nils Stensson Sture (1512–1527/28), supposedly the daljunkern
- Nils Svantesson Sture (1543–1567), Swedish diplomat and soldier killed in the Sture Murders
- Nils Bosson Sture (1426–1494), Swedish noble
