= Marcus Ekheim =

Swedish footballer

Personal information
- Full name: Marcus Ekheim
- Position: Defender

Senior career*
Years	Team	Apps	(Gls)
1989–1991	Malmö FF	25	(0)
1994	Landskrona BoIS	15	(1)
- * Club domestic league appearances and goals

Marcus Ekheim is a Swedish former footballer who played as a defender.
