= Sture Frölén =

Swedish architect

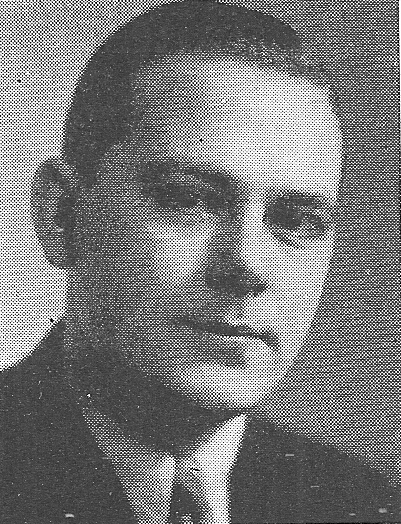
- Born: 13 May 1907; Stockholm, Sweden
- Died: 27 December 1999 (aged 92); Båstad, Sweden
- Occupation: Architect

Sture Frölén (13 May 1907 – 27 December 1999) was a Swedish architect. His work was part of the architecture event in the art competition at the 1948 Summer Olympics. In his extensive work, he later designed buildings of various kinds, such as sports facilities, industries, town halls, schools and churches.
