= Sture Larsson =

Swedish footballer (1919–2003)

Personal information
- Full name: Nils Sture Larsson
- Date of birth: 14 December 1919
- Date of death: 27 April 2003 (aged 83)

Senior career*
Years	Team	Apps	(Gls)
1938–1948	Djurgården		
- * Club domestic league appearances and goals

Nils Sture Larsson (14 December 1919 – 27 April 2003) was a Swedish footballer and bandy player. Larsson made 37 Allsvenskan appearances for Djurgården and scored 12 goals.

Larsson represented Djurgårdens IF Bandy in the 1940 and 1941 seasons. He died on 27 April 2003, at the age of 83.
