= Niklas Karlström =

Swedish footballer

Senior career*
Years	Team	Apps	(Gls)
- Djurgården
- * Club domestic league appearances and goals

Niklas Karlström is a Swedish retired footballer. Karlström made 41 Allsvenskan appearances for Djurgården and scored 10 goals.
