= Ken Burvall =

Swedish footballer

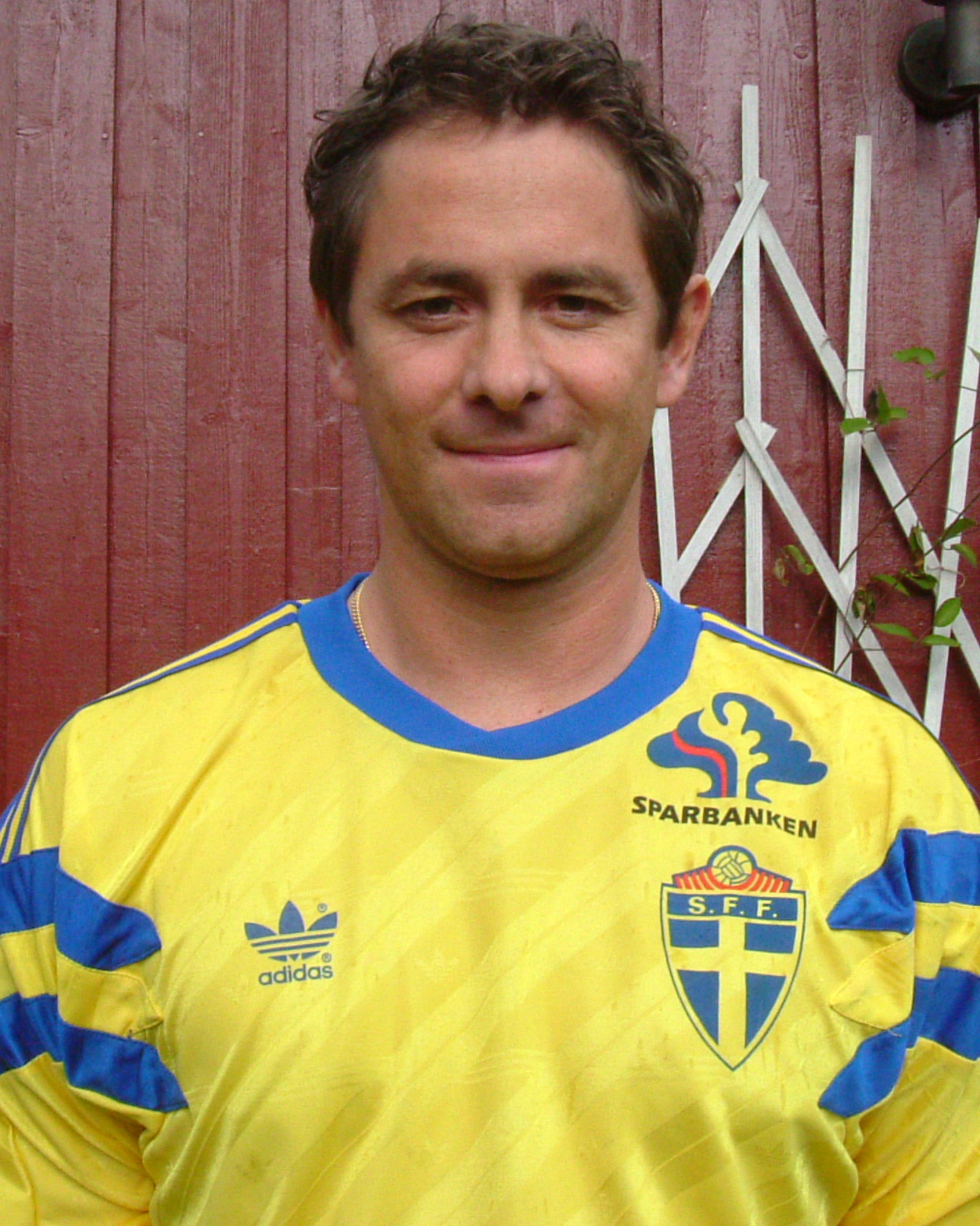
- Burvall headshot in his SFF uniform

Personal information
- Full name: Ken Roger Burvall
- Date of birth: 27 March 1966 (age 60)
- Position: Midfielder

Senior career*
Years	Team	Apps	(Gls)
–1984	Malå IF		
1985–1989	Kalmar AIK	119	(13)
1990–1993	Djurgårdens IF	91	(13)
1994	Östers IF	19	(1)
1995	Kalmar FF	14	(10)
1995–1997	Admira Wacker Wien	40	(2)
1997	Kalmar FF	10	(5)
1998–1999	Loverslunds BK		
2000	IFK Berga		

International career
1991–1992	Sweden	4	(0)
- * Club domestic league appearances and goals

Ken Roger Burvall (born 27 March 1966) is a Swedish former footballer. He played for Kalmar AIK, Djurgårdens IF, Östers IF, Kalmar FF, Admira Wacker Wien, Kalmar FF, Loverslunds BK, IFK Berga. He made four appearances for Sweden men's national football team.
