= Anders Almgren =

Swedish footballer (born 1968)

Personal information
- Full name: John Anders Fredrik Almgren
- Date of birth: 27 December 1968 (age 57)
- Place of birth: Stockholm, Sweden
- Height: 1.85 m (6 ft 1 in)
- Position: Goalkeeper

Senior career*
Years	Team	Apps	(Gls)
1986–1992	Djurgården		
1993–1996	Vasalunds IF		
1996–1997	AIK		
1998–2002	Assyriska FF		
2003–2006	AIK		
- * Club domestic league appearances and goals

John Anders Fredrik Almgren (born 27 December 1968) is a Swedish former professional footballer who played as a goalkeeper. He made 70 Allsvenskan appearances for Djurgården.
