= Erik Lallerstedt =

Swedish chef (1946–2026)

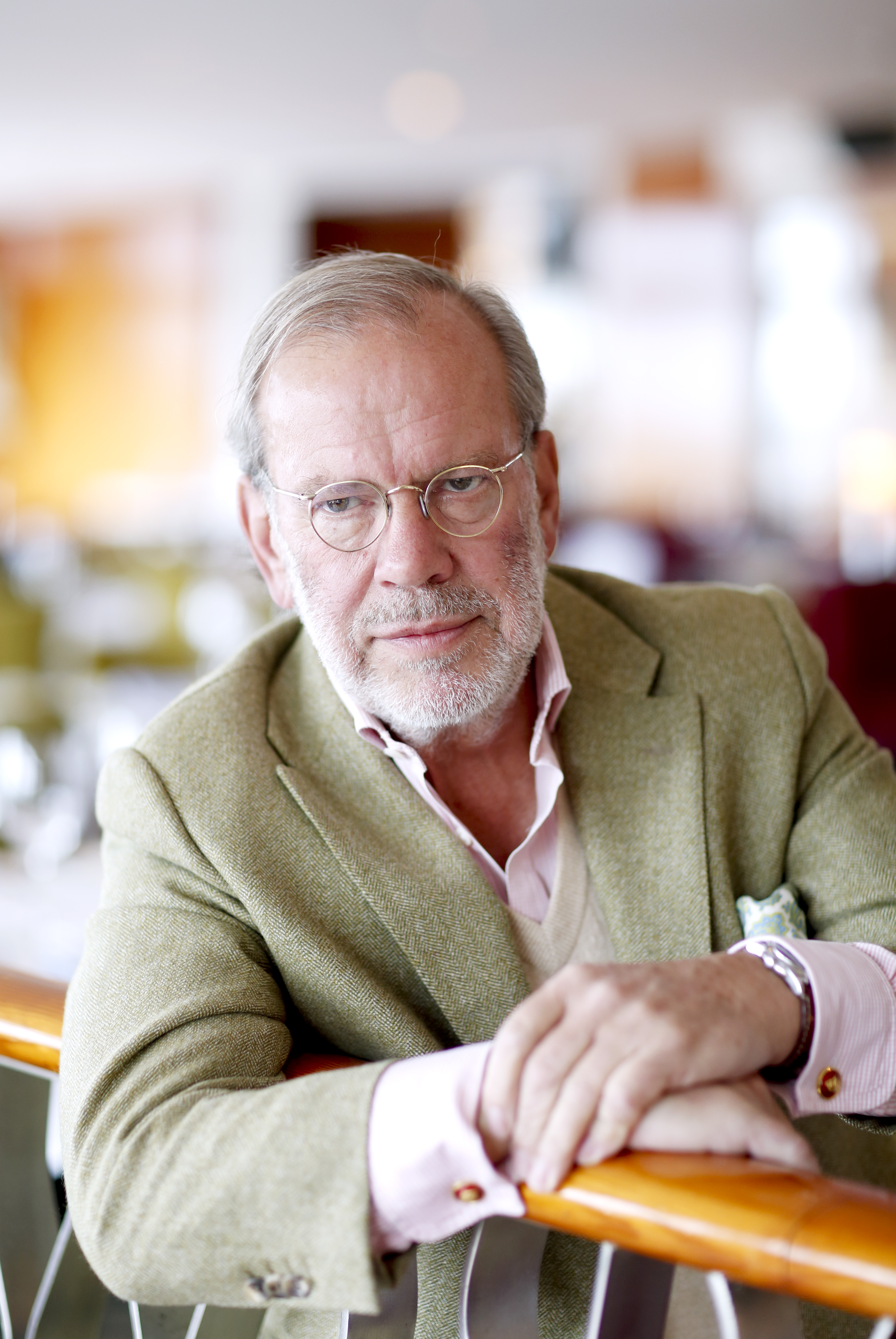
- Lallerstedt in 2012
- Born: 23 June 1946; Kungsholmen, Sweden
- Died: 9 April 2026 (aged 79)
- Occupation: Chef

Erik Anders Lallerstedt (23 June 1946 – 9 April 2026) was a Swedish chef and restaurateur. In 1979, he opened the restaurant Erik Lallerstedt's Restaurant & Ostronbar at trandvägskajen in Stockholm, this restaurant was one of the first in Sweden to earn a star in the Guide Michelin.

Lallerstedt died on 9 April 2026, at the age of 79.
