= Alster (disambiguation) =

Alster is a tributary of the Elbe river in Northern Germany.

Alster may also refer to:

- Alster (Itz), a river of Bavaria and Thuringia, Germany, tributary of the Itz
- Alster, Sweden, a locality in Värmland County, Sweden
- Der Club an der Alster, a German sports club in Hamburg
- German auxiliary Alster (A50) (1988), an intelligence ship of the German Navy
- Mathilda Alster, a fictitious character in the Japanese manga Beyblade
- a Shandy with lemonade called Alster in northern Germany
- SS Alster, a number of steamships
