= Bo Almqvist =

Folklore scholar (1931–2013)

Bo Gunnar Almqvist
- Born: 5 May 1931; Edsgatan, Alster, Värmland, Sweden
- Died: 9 November 2013 (aged 82); Dublin, Ireland
- Education: Uppsala University
- Occupations: Writer, academic, folklorist

Bo Gunnar Almqvist (5 May 1931 – 9 November 2013) was a Swedish academic and folklorist.

== Early life ==
Bo Gunnar Almqvist was born on 5 May 1931 in Edsgatan, a small community in Alster, a farming district in the province of Värmland, Sweden, an area noted for its old customs and traditions. He was the youngest child, born eleven years after his siblings, in the family of two sons and three daughters of Oskar Almqvist, a 'landfiskal', effectively the police superintendent of the rural area, and Hulda Almqvist (née Rydberg). Oskar Almqvist died when Bo was fourteen and mother and son moved to the town of Karlstad, where he attended Karlstad Läroverk, the local secondary school. Hulda Almqvist worked for a time in her family's hat making business. She had a remarkable repertoire of traditional proverbs to be used on any occasion, and her knowledge of folklife crafts and calendar customs deepened her son's interest in the folkways and oral culture of his native region.

== Career ==
In 1950 Bo entered Uppsala University to study Nordic languages and literature, along with English. He was also intrigued by Irish scholarship and took lessons in the Irish language from Caoimhín Ó Danachair, a visiting professor in Irish studies (1952–3). Dag Strömbäck, professor of folklore at Uppsala, became a lifelong friend and greatly influenced Almqvist's choice of career. Almqvist developed a great interest in, and knowledge of, comparative philology and historical linguistics. After graduating from Uppsala in 1954, he spent a year on a scholarship in Reykjavík studying Icelandic language and literature.

On his return to Sweden, a year of compulsory military service, though mostly spent as an attendant in military archives, was far from enjoyable, and Almqvist was glad to return to Iceland in 1956 as a lecturer in Swedish. In 1959 he was awarded one of the first B.Phil. degrees of the University of Iceland (Baccalaureatus Philologiæ Islandicæ). Almqvist returned to work in 1960 to the folklore department in Uppsala University, as docent (1965–7) and acting professor (1967–9). He successfully defended his doctoral thesis in Uppsala, and Norrön niddiktning: traditionshistoriska studier i versmagi was eventually published in two volumes, in 1965 and 1972. His findings, on the magical power of satire and attitudes to manliness in Old Icelandic poetry, were regarded as a major contribution to the study of Old Norse literature and to ethnography.

From 1953, when he attended a summer school in UCD, Almqvist spent months at a time doing fieldwork in Ireland, especially in Dunquin and Dingle, County Kerry. He collected many traditional stories and hundreds of proverbs from his informants, such as his longtime friend Michéal Ó Gaoithín, son of Peig Sayers, and Cáit ‘Bab’ Feiritéar, collecting them. Dunquin locals nicknamed him 'An Lochlannach' ('The Viking'). In 1972 he moved to Ireland permanently to take up positions as professor of folklore in UCD and director of the Irish Folklore Archive (later the National Folklore Collection) (Coimisiún Béaloideasa Éireann in Irish).

Fluent in Irish and the Nordic languages, and also in English, French and German, Almqvist was able to compare and contrast folklore and literature across several traditions, drawing on linguistic clues and on fieldwork undertaken in Scotland and Nordic countries as well as Ireland. His wide knowledge was evident in over ninety published articles and several books. His scholarly reputation and European perspective underpinned the development of the study of folklore as an academic discipline in Ireland through the introduction of new courses and inspiring fieldwork, and his influence hastened the disappearance of the rather parochial attitude to Irish tradition evident in some earlier studies. From 1968 he was a member of the editorial board of Tidskrift for Nordisk folkeminneforskning (later Scandinavian Yearbook of Folklore).

== Later life ==
In his long involvement with Béaloideas, the journal of the Folklore of Ireland Society, he monitored and encouraged study of all aspects of Irish and comparative folklife studies. He was editor of Béaloideas in 1971–3 and 1977–9, advisory editor from 1981, and from 1972 general editor of the publications of Comhairle Bhéaloideas Éireann. He also wrote a history of the Irish Folklore Commission (1979). Almqvist trained most of the folklore scholars of the next generation. His influence on them and popularity with international colleagues was evident in two festschriften, Viking ale (1991) a collection of his own major articles published to honour his sixtieth birthday, and Northern lights (2001) for his seventieth. Collaborative publications included material recorded from Peig Sayers (I will speak to you all (2009)). Almqvist was a member of the Royal Irish Academy (elected 1981) and of the Swedish Kungliga Gustav Adolfs Akademien, as well as other learned societies.

Almqvist also had a notable interest in philology and comparative literature; his enthusiasm for tracing the not always obvious connections between medieval literature and contemporary folklore led to the introduction of a new course in UCD. One of his students on that course was Éilís Ní Dhuibhne, a writer and folklorist. She and Almqvist married years later in 1982 after his first marriage ended, and they had two sons, Ragnar and Olaf. Ragnar Almqvist is currently the Ambassador of Ireland to Hungary. Almqvist's first marriage, in Iceland, had been to Jane Houston (died 2018), an American textile artist and photographer, who became an expert on traditional Irish white embroidery; they had one daughter, Marja.

After a short illness, Bo Almqvist died on 9 November 2013 in Loughlinstown Hospital, Dublin. His funeral was from the Church of our Lady Seat of Wisdom, Belfield, to Mount Jerome crematorium.

== Selected works ==
Norrön niddiktning. Vol. 1 Nid mot furstar. Vol. 2 Nid mot missionärer. (Stockholm : Almqvist & Wiksell, 1965, 1972).

'The Uglier Foot (AT 1559B*). An Anecdote in Old Icelandic Literature and Its Counterpart in Irish Folk Tradition' Béaloideas 27–28 (1973) 1–58 (first published in Swedish in Scripta Islandica 17 (1966)).

(with David Greene (eds.)), Proceedings of the Seventh Viking Congress. Dublin 15–21 August 1973. (London: Viking Society for Northern Research, 1976).

An Béaloideas agus an Litríocht. (Baile an Fheirtéaraigh, Co. Chiarraí, Ireland : Cló Dhuibhne, 1977).

‘The Irish Folklore Commission. Achievement and Legacy’ Béaloideas 45–47 (1977–79) 6–26.

‘Scandinavian and Celtic Folklore Contacts in the Earldom of Orkney’ Saga-Book 20 (1978–81) 80–105.

(with Séamas Ó Catháin and Pádraig Ó Héalaí (eds.)), Fiannaíocht: Essays on the Fenian Tradition of Ireland and Scotland. (Dublin: Folklore of Ireland Society, 1987).

(with Séamas Ó Catháin and Pádraig Ó Héalaí (eds.)), The Heroic Process: Form, Function, and Fantasy in Folk Epic. The Proceedings of the International Folk Epic Conference, University College, Dublin, 2–6 September 1985. (Dublin: Glendale Press, 1987).

‘Of Mermaids and Marriages. Séamus Heaney’s ‘Maighdean Mhara’ and Nuala Ní Dhomhnaill's ‘An Mhaighdean Mhara’ in the Light of Folk Tradition.’ Béaloideas 58 (1990) 1–74.

‘The Mysterious Mícheál Ó Gaoithín, Boccaccio and the Blasket Tradition. Reflections Occasioned by James Stewart’s “Boccaccio in the Blaskets”’ Béaloideas 58 (1990) 75–140.

‘Irish Migratory Legends on the Supernatural. Sources, Studies and Problems’ Béaloideas 59 (1991) (special issue: The Fairy Hill Is on Fire!) 1–44.

‘Waterhorse Legends (MLSIT 4086 & 4086B). The Case for and against a Connection between Irish and Nordic Tradition’ Béaloideas 59 (1991) 107–120.

Viking Ale: Studies on Folklore Contacts between the Northern and Western Worlds. Presented to the Author on the Occasion of his 60th Birthday. ed. Éilís Ní Dhuibhne-Almqvist and Séamas Ó Catháin. (Aberystwyth: Boethius Press, 1991).

Färingasagan. Faereyínga saga. Hedemora 1992.

‘Fylgjor, livsfjärilar och livsfiskar. Några bidrag till isländsk-irisk själstro’ in Ailbhe Ó'Corráin (ed.), Proceedings of the Third Symposium of Societas Celtologica Nordica. Uppsala Uppsala Universitet 1994, 115–145.

(With Dáithí Ó hÓgáin) Skálda: éigse is eachtraíocht sa tSean-Lochlainn. (Indreabhán, Co. na Gaillimhe: An Clóchomhar, 1995).

‘Gaelic/Norse Folklore Contacts: Some Reflections on Their Scope and Character’ Bildung und Literatur (1996) 139–172.

‘Before Columbus. Some Irish Folklore Motifs in the Old Icelandic Traditions about Wineland’ in Folke Josephson (ed.), Celts and Vikings. Göteborg: Göteborgs Universitet 1997, 225–252.

‘Is Búkolla a Celtic Cow?’ in Ailbhe Ó Corráin (ed.), Proceedings of the Fifth Symposium of Societas Celtologica Nordica. Uppsala: Uppsala Universitet 2001, 101–116.

‘C. W. von Sydow agus Éire: scoláire Sualannach agus an léann Ceilteach (C. W. von Sydow and Ireland: a Swedish Scholar and Celtic Studies)’ Béaloideas 70 (2002) 3–49.

(with Roibéard Ó Cathasaigh (eds.)), Ó Bhéal an Bhab: Cnuas-scéalta Bhab Feiritéar (From Bab's Mouth. A Collection of Bab Feiritéar's Stories). Indreabhán 2002.

‘The Scholar and the Storyteller: Heinrich Wagner’s Collections from Peig Sayers’ Béaloideas 72 (2004) 31–59.

(with Roibéard Ó Cathasaigh (eds.)), 'Paidreacha agus Orthaí ó Bhab Feiritéar (Prayers and Charms from Bab Feiritear)' Béaloideas 73 (2005) 135–171.

‘Arastotail ar an mBlascaod (Aristotle in the Blasket Islands)’ in Dónall Ó Baoill, Donncha Ó hAodha and Nollaig Ó Muraíle (eds.) Saltair Saíochta, Sanasaíochta agus Seanchais. A Festschrift for Gearóid Mac Eoin. Dublin: Four Courts Press, 2013, 6–16.

(with Pádraig Ó Héalaí (eds.)), Peig Sayers, Labharfad le cách: scéalta agus seanchas taifeadta ag Radio Éireann agus BBC/I will speak to You All: Stories and Lore Recorded by Radio Éireann and the BBC. Dublin: RTÉ 2009.

== Relevant literature ==
- Obituary, The Irish Times, 16 November 2013.
- Terry Gunnell, 'In Memoriam: Bo Almqvist (1931-2013)', Folklore 125 (August 2014), 258–61.
- Anne Markey and Anne O'Connor (eds). Folklore and Modern Irish Writing. Sallins, Co. Kildare, Ireland : Irish Academic Press. 2014.
- Fionnuala Carson Williams. In Memoriam: Tribute to Professor Bo Almqvist. Proceedings of the Seventh Interdisciplinary Colloquium on Proverbs, November 2013, at Tavira, Portugal, ed. by Rui J. B. Soares and Outi Lauhakangas, pp. 483–484. Tavira: Tipografia Tavirense. 2014.
- Séamas Ó Catháin. 'Bo Almqvist 1931-2013' Fabula Vol. 55 Issue 3/4 (2014), 318–21.
- Klintberg, Bengt af. 2016. Bo Almquist, obituary. ARV Nordic yearbook of Folklore Vol. 70, Special issue: Magic and Texts 167–170.
