= Vi är svenska fotbollsgrabbar =

Song by Sweden national football team

from the album Vägen till VM
- Language: Swedish
- Released: May 1974
- Recorded: 23 February 1974
- Studio: EMI Studios, Stockholm, Sweden
- Genre: schlager
- Label: Polydor
- Songwriter: Georg Ericson

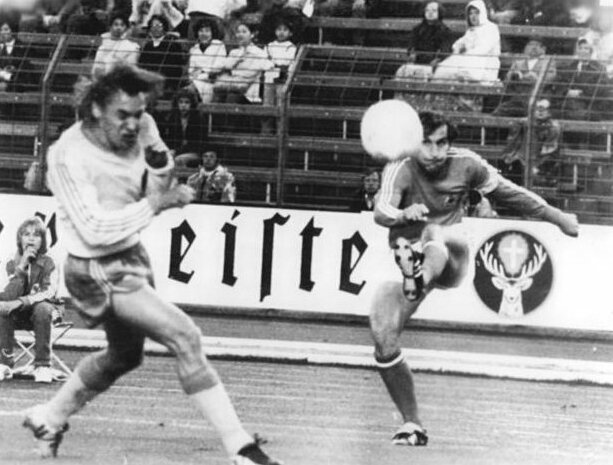
Swedish success during the 1974 FIFA World Cup led to the song becoming popular.

"Vi är svenska fotbollsgrabbar" is a song written by Georg "Åby" Ericson, and used as a anthem for the Sweden national team during the 1974 FIFA World Cup in West Germany. The song recording featured Georg "Åby" Ericson playing the piano, and the players on vocals.

Sweden taking up the 5th rank in the tournament was considered at the time a success, and the song became popular. The song also became a Svensktoppen hit between 30 June-21 July 1974, with two fifth positions being followed up by one 7th and one 9th position.

Before the 2002 FIFA World Cup in Japan and South Korea, Magnus Uggla covered the song.
