= Sweden men's national football team =

Men's association football team

Sweden
- Nickname(s): Blågult (The Blue and Yellow)
- Association: Svenska Fotbollförbundet (SvFF)
- Confederation: UEFA (Europe)
- Head coach: Graham Potter
- Captain: Victor Lindelöf
- Most caps: Anders Svensson (148)
- Top scorer: Zlatan Ibrahimović (62)
- Home stadium: Nationalarenan
- FIFA code: SWE
First colours	Second colours

FIFA ranking
- Current: 34 ▲3 (7 October 2026)
- Highest: 2 (November 1994)
- Lowest: 45 (March 2015, October–November 2015, March 2017)

First international
- Sweden 11–3 Norway (Gothenburg, Sweden; 12 July 1908)

Biggest win
- Sweden 12–0 Latvia (Stockholm, Sweden; 29 May 1927); Sweden 12–0 South Korea (London, England; 5 August 1948)

Biggest defeat
- Great Britain 12–1 Sweden (London, England; 20 October 1908)

World Cup
- Appearances: 13 (first in 1934)
- Best result: Runners-up (1958)

European Championship
- Appearances: 7 (first in 1992)
- Best result: Semi-finals (1992)

Olympic Games
- Appearances: 7 (first in 1908)
- Best result: Gold medal (1948)
Medal record
Men's football
World Cup
Silver medal – second place	1958 Sweden	Team
Bronze medal – third place	1950 Brazil	Team
Bronze medal – third place	1994 United States	Team
Olympic Games
Gold medal – first place	1948 London	Team
Bronze medal – third place	1924 Paris	Team
Bronze medal – third place	1952 Helsinki	Team
- Website: www.svenskfotboll.se

The Sweden men's national football team (Swedish: Sveriges herrlandslag i fotboll) represents Sweden in men's international football and it is controlled by the Swedish Football Association, the governing body of football in Sweden. Sweden's home ground is Nationalarenan in Solna. From 1945 to the late 1950s, they were considered one of the greatest teams in Europe.

Sweden has made thirteen appearances at the World Cup with their first coming in 1934. They have also made seven appearances at the European Championship. Sweden finished second at the 1958 FIFA World Cup, which they hosted, and third in both 1950 and 1994. Sweden's other accomplishments also include a gold medal at the 1948 Summer Olympics, and bronze medals in 1924 and 1952. They also reached the semi-finals at UEFA Euro 1992, while hosting the tournament. Sweden's most prominent result in recent history was at the 2018 FIFA World Cup, where they reached the quarter-finals.

== History ==
Sweden has traditionally been a strong team in international football, with 13 World Cup appearances and 3 medals in the Olympics. Sweden national team finished second in the 1958 World Cup, when it was the host team, being beaten by Brazil 5–2 in the final. Sweden has also finished third twice, in 1950 and 1994. In 1938, they finished fourth.

=== Early history ===
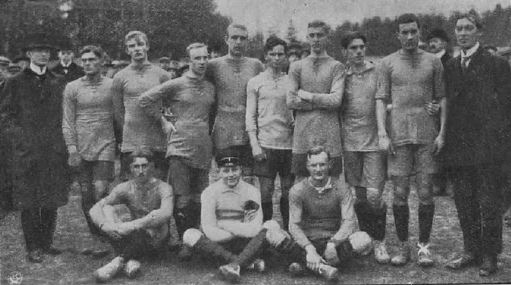
The Sweden team in 1911

Sweden played its first international game against Norway on 12 July 1908, an 11–3 victory at Idrottsplatsen in Gothenburg. Other matches in 1908 were played against England, Great Britain, the Netherlands (twice) and Belgium; Sweden lost all five matches. In the same year, Sweden competed in the 1908 Summer Olympics for the first time. Sweden, however, lost a game in the Olympics against the Great Britain 1–12, the largest loss in the Sweden national team's history.

Sweden played in the 1912 Olympics (as hosts), the 1920 Olympics, and in the 1924 Olympics, where Sweden took the bronze and their first medal ever.

=== 1938 FIFA World Cup ===
The 1938 World Cup was Sweden's second qualification for the World Cup. In the first round, they were scheduled to play against Austria, but after Germany's occupation of Austria, the Austrian team could not continue playing in the tournament. Instead, Sweden went straight to the quarter-finals match against Cuba. They beat Cuba 8–0 with both Harry Andersson (in his debut) and Gustav Wetterström scoring hat-tricks. In the semi-final match against Hungary, Sweden lost 1–5. Sweden's next match was the third-place match against Brazil. In that game the Swedes lost 2–4, and ended in fourth place for the first and only time in Sweden national team football history.

=== 1948 Summer Olympics ===
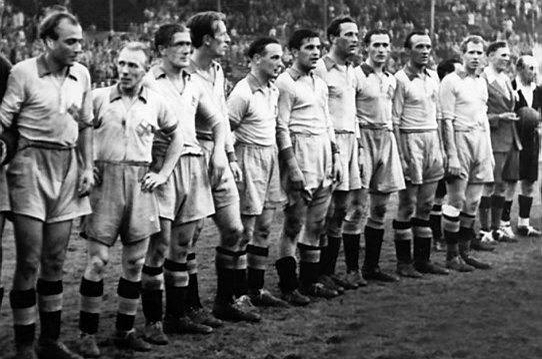
The 1948 team that won the Olympic gold medal

In the first round, Sweden played against Austria. The Austrian team had qualified without their professional players, which was a surprise since the Austrian league had many professional players who were allowed to play in the tournament. The match was played at White Hart Lane in London and Sweden won 3–0. In the second game, Sweden played against South Korea and won 12–0, one of the two largest margin wins Sweden has ever had. In the semi-final Sweden met their archrivals from Denmark beating them 4–2.

The final was played at legendary Wembley Stadium in London. The attendance was around 40,000 people which was high for a football game in those days. Sweden took on Yugoslavia in the final and won 3–1, with goals by Gunnar Gren (24', 67'), Stjepan Bobek (42') and Gunnar Nordahl (48'). This was Sweden's first championship win in any international football tournament.

=== 1950 FIFA World Cup ===
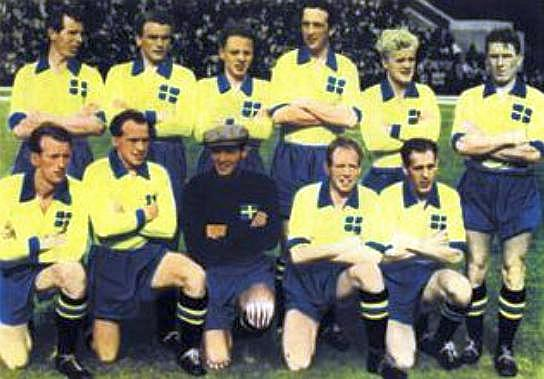
The 1950 Sweden national team

In the 1950 World Cup, the Swedish football association did not allow any professional Swedish football players to take part. Consequently, Sweden only fielded amateur players during the tournament.

Qualifying for the tournament as one of six European national teams, Sweden played in the same group as Italy and Paraguay. (India withdrew from the group.)

In the first match, Sweden beat Italy 3–2 in São Paulo. The second match was a 2–2 draw against Paraguay. With the most points in the group, Sweden advanced to the next round.

Their first game in the second stage – also a group format – was against the hosts Brazil. It was played at the Maracanã Stadium with a total attendance of more than 138,000, to this day the record attendance for the Sweden national team. The game ended 7–1 to Brazil and it is rumored that almost everyone in the Brazilian audience waved the Swedes goodbye with their scarfs.

The next game was against Uruguay, who Sweden played against for the first time in World Cup history. Played in São Paulo, Uruguay won the game 3–2, which meant Sweden were unable to play for the gold.

The final game for Sweden in the tournament was played in São Paulo, against Spain. Sweden won 3–1 with goals by Stig Sundqvist (15'), Bror Mellberg (34') and Karl-Erik Palmér (79'). Sweden finished 3rd in the group and took their first World Cup medal. As Sweden was the best placed European team, Sweden was, as the time, regarded "unofficial European champions".

At the Summer Olympics in 1952 in Helsinki, Sweden continued to achieve success and won an Olympic bronze. The following year, the Football Association decided not to allow foreign professionals to play in the national team and the team failed to qualify for the World Championships in Switzerland in 1954 when Sweden only came second in their qualifying group behind Belgium.

=== 1958 FIFA World Cup success ===
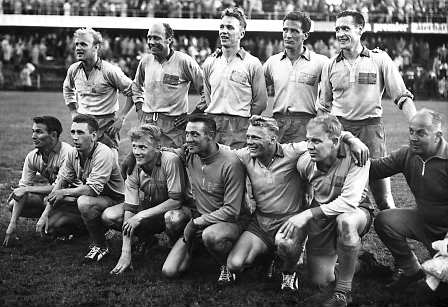
Sweden won the silver medal at the 1958 World Cup

In 1956, the Swedish football federation allowed the professional footballers to play for the national team again, giving Swedish football fans hope for the 1958 FIFA World Cup. Sweden, the host nation, were in the same group as Mexico, Hungary and Wales.

The first game, Sweden vs Mexico, was played at Sweden's national stadium, Råsunda Stadium, Solna, and was attended by around 32,000 people. Sweden won the game 3–0, taking the lead in Group 3. The next match was against Hungary, who had finished 2nd in the 1954 World Cup in Switzerland and were also the 1952 Olympic Champions. Also played at Råsunda, this game ended 2–1 to Sweden, with both goals scored by Kurt Hamrin. In the next match, against Wales, Sweden drew 0–0.

Making it through to the quarter-finals, playing at Råsunda for the fourth time in this tournament, Sweden were up against the USSR and won 2–0.

The semi-final at Ullevi, Gothenburg against the reigning World Champions from 1954, West Germany, was the only game in the tournament which Sweden did not play at Råsunda. The crowd of around 50,000 people attended one of the best games Sweden played in the tournament. West Germany led by 1–0 when Erich Juskowiak was sent off in the 59th minute. Sweden won 3–1.

The final was played at Råsunda between host nation Sweden and the 1950 FIFA World Cup runners-up, Brazil. The total attendance was approximately 52,000 people. Brazil ended up winning the World Cup for the first time ever after beating Sweden by 5–2. Sweden consequently became runners-up, the best result for Sweden in any World Cup and the only Nordic country to achieve this so far. After the final match the Brazilian players honoured the host nation by sprinting around the pitch holding a Swedish flag.

=== 1960s ===
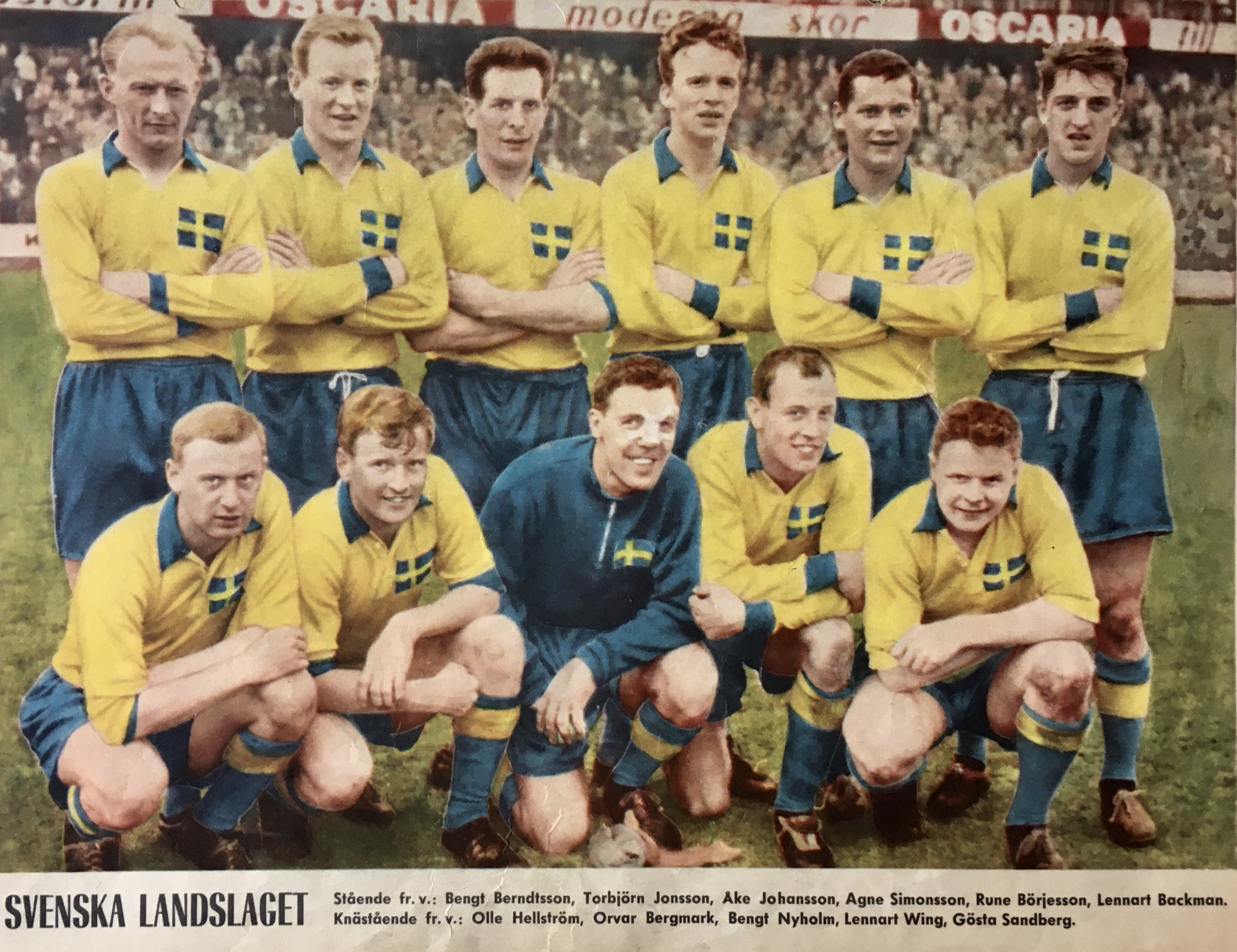
The Sweden national football team in 1961 with these players – rear row from left: Bengt Berndtsson, Torbjörn Jonsson, Åke Johansson, Agne Simonsson, Rune Börjesson and Lennart Backman; front row from left: Olle Hellström, Orvar Bergmark, Bengt Nyholm, Lennart Wing and Gösta Sandberg

After the successful 1958 World Cup, Sweden's fortunes diminished. In the qualification round of the 1962 World Cup, Sweden won its group in impressive fashion (scoring 10 goals and only having 3 goals scored against it), but it still had to win a playoff game against Switzerland to qualify. The game was played in West Berlin, and the Swiss won, 2–1.

Sweden almost got to the UEFA European Championship 1964. They started their playoff against Norway and won the first game and drew in the last game. In the second round, Sweden beat Yugoslavia, 3–2, but they lost the first game. In the quarter-finals, Sweden played against the defending champions, the Soviet Union. Sweden tied the first game but lost the second.

During the 1966 World Cup qualification, Sweden was in the UEFA Qualification group 2. Sweden started the qualification with a draw against West Germany and then a 3–0 victory over Cyprus. But only the winner of the group advanced and Sweden was eliminated with a loss in its next game against West Germany.

Sweden successfully entered the UEFA European Championship in 1968, but they finished in the Qualification group 2.

=== 1970s ===
Sweden's only major success in the '60s was to qualify for the 1970 World Cup, after winning UEFA Group 5 ahead of Norway and France. Sweden finished third in its group, losing a tie-breaker with eventual No. 4 Uruguay, and did not advance to the elimination round, however. The winner of Sweden's group was eventual world runner-up Italy.

In the qualification of the 1974 FIFA World Cup, Sweden was in the same group as Austria, Hungary and Malta. Sweden clinched a narrow win via a classic playoff-match against Austria in a snowy Gelsenkirchen, and advanced to the World Cup finals in West Germany. During the World Cup, the team released Vi är svenska fotbollsgrabbar, a fight song written by Georg Ericson.

The group Sweden drew into included Uruguay, Netherlands and Bulgaria. The first game against Bulgaria ended in a draw. In the second game against the Netherlands, Sweden drew another tie. The last game of the round was played against Uruguay. That game was the first victory Sweden had in the tournament, when they beat Uruguay 3–0 with goals by Roland Sandberg (74') and Ralf Edström (46', 77'). Sweden finished 2nd in the group and advanced to the second group stage.

In the second group stage, Sweden was defeated in the first game against Poland 0–1. The situation after the defeat against Poland was that if Sweden lost against West Germany with a single goal difference and Yugoslavia defeated Poland, Sweden would be second in the group and play for the bronze medal. But since Poland beat Yugoslavia 2–1, Sweden had to win the game against the host nation, West Germany, to finish second in the group.

The game against West Germany was played in Düsseldorf with an attendance of 66,500 people. The Sweden national team striker Ralf Edström gave the Scandinavian the lead with 1–0 after 29 minutes. But in the second half West Germany took control of the game, even after Roland Sandberg's equaliser after 52 minutes. Germany won 4–2. After the tournament, the German players commented that the game against Sweden was their best game in that tournament. The last game for Sweden was played in Düsseldorf against Yugoslavia. Sweden won that game 2–1. They finished the tournament as the 5th place team. The Sweden national team had profiles that Ronnie Hellström, Bo Larsson and Björn Nordqvist.

Sweden did not qualify for the European Championship quarter-finals game in 1976. On 11 May 1976, Sweden lost for the first time since 1937 at home to Denmark.

1978 took Sweden for the third consecutive World Cup. Sweden made it from the qualifiers in a three team group with Switzerland and Norway as opponents. The qualifying session was played in 1976 and 1977 in the 1978 FIFA World Cup in Argentina, Sweden played the first match with a draw (1–1) against Brazil. Swedish scorer was Thomas Sjöberg. 1–1 was Sweden's best result so far in the World Cup against Brazil context (the result was repeated between the two countries at the World Cup finals in 1994). The team then lost against Austria (0–1) and Spain (0–1). The Sweden national team finished last in the group with 1 point and goal difference 1–3. Several of the profiles from 1974, still with (Larsson, Edström, Nordqvist) but also new players such as Anders Linderoth, Hasse Borg and Torbjörn Nilsson.

=== 1980s ===
After the successful 1970s, reaching all three World Cups, Sweden changed their coach from Georg "Åby" Ericson to Lars "Laban" Arnesson. Arnesson had been a successful coach for Östers IF before becoming national team coach. Sweden failed to qualify for the UEFA Euro 1980 after only managing to win against Luxembourg in qualifying in a group that also included Czechoslovakia and France, and the 1982 FIFA World Cup, ending third to Scotland and Northern Ireland. In 1983, Sweden met Brazil in Gothenburg to play a friendly, the match ended 3–3. They failed to qualify for the UEFA Euro 1984, despite defeating the then-reigning world champions Italy 3–0 in Naples, including two goals by Glenn Strömberg, but were unable to prevail against Romania in the battle for the top spot, losing both away and at home against the Tricolours. The Sweden setbacks continued. After the failed qualification for the 1986 World Cup, Olle Nordin took over the team. Sweden lost their match against Czechoslovakia with 1–2 in the final qualifying round, while Portugal unexpectedly won 1–0 away against West Germany and took second place in the group. It was West Germany's first ever loss in a World Cup qualifier.

Sweden also failed to qualify to the UEFA Euro 1988 in West Germany.

=== 1990s ===
They won their qualification group for the 1990 World Cup ahead of England and went on to their first World Cup in 12 years. However, the World Cup campaign ended quickly after three 1–2 defeats in the group stage matches, against Brazil, Scotland and Costa Rica. As of July 2026, it is the only time that Sweden has failed to score points in a World Cup tournament. After the World Cup, Olle Nordin resigned and Nisse Andersson became an interim coach until Tommy Svensson took over in 1991.

As the host of the UEFA Euro 1992, Sweden played in their first ever European Championship tournament. They were drawn in group A with Denmark, France and England. Sweden managed to advance as group winners ahead of the eventual champions Denmark. In the semi-finals following the group stage, Sweden were eliminated by Germany with 2–3. As of July 2016, the semi-final place remains Sweden's best result ever in a European Championship.

Sweden qualified for the 1994 World Cup in the United States at the top of their qualifying group ahead of Bulgaria and France. Sweden was placed in Group B with Brazil, Cameroon and Russia. The first game against Cameroon in Los Angeles looked to be yet another 1–2 loss, (after the 1990 World Cup fiasco with losses of 1–2 in all three games) but in the 75th minute, Martin Dahlin scored the equaliser from a rebound shot off of Henrik Larsson and the match finished 2–2. In the next game against Russia in Detroit, Russia was handed an early penalty and made it 1–0. Sweden managed to come back, with a penalty goal from Tomas Brolin and two goals from Martin Dahlin, with the result being 3–1. In the last group stage match, against Brazil (also in Detroit), they tied 1–1 after goals by Kennet Andersson ('23) and Romário ('47).

In the first knockout-stage match, Sweden faced Saudi Arabia in the extreme heat and humidity of Dallas, where the game started at the hottest time of day- 4:30 p.m. where temperatures went past 40C (104F) in an outdoor stadium. Sweden won 3–1 after two goals from Kennet Andersson and one from Martin Dahlin. Sweden's quarter-final match in San Francisco against Romania has become a memorable match for Sweden national team football fans. After Sweden had scored late in the second half, Romania managed to equalise in the dying minutes of the match, sending it into extra time. Romania's Florin Răducioiu, who scored the first goal for Romania, scored his second of the day to take Romania ahead at the 101st minute. But with five minutes left, Kennet Andersson scored with a header to make it level at 2–2. The penalty shoot-out began with a miss from Håkan Mild of Sweden, but Thomas Ravelli managed to save two penalties from Daniel Prodan and Miodrag Belodedici, giving Sweden the win and making himself a hero. Sweden advanced to the semi-finals, where they were to face Brazil in Los Angeles. They had managed to score in the group stage against Brazil but couldn't do it a second time. After Jonas Thern had been sent off with a red card, Romário scored the only goal of the game in the 80th minute.

In the third-place match, Sweden played against a Bulgaria side that had lost to Italy in their semi-final match in New York City. Sweden scored 4 goals in the first half, but the second half went goalless. Sweden finished 3rd and won the bronze medal, the best placing for the national team in a World Cup since the 1958 silver medal. This led Sweden to a second-place in the FIFA Men's World Rankings for one month, in November 1994.

They finished as the top scorers of the tournament, with 15 goals scored in total.

After the World Cup in 1994, Sweden had difficulty reaching up to the same level. The national team was knocked out in qualifying for the 1996 European Championships in England and the World Cup in France in 1998. The qualification for the Euro 96 had started with a win for Sweden 1–0 away against Iceland in September 1994, but then lost against Switzerland away from home. In November 1994, Tomas Brolin broke his foot in a win against Hungary. In the spring of 1995 continued failure in the European Championship qualifiers. Sweden lost the away games against Turkey and played 1–1 draw at home to Iceland. When Sweden drew 0–0 against Switzerland in Gothenburg in September 1995, it was clear that the team would miss the European Championship finals.

The qualifying game for the France 98 was not better. In October 1996, Austria won 1–0 in Stockholm and the month after the Swedes lost against Scotland on away ground. Admittedly, Sweden won against Scotland in the return match in Gothenburg on Walpurgis Night in 1997, but in September 1997 won Austria 1–0 in Vienna. In October 1997, Tommy Svensson quit as head coach and Tommy Söderberg took over.

=== 2000s ===
Sweden qualified impressively for this tournament, winning all games except the away game against England (0–0) and conceding only one goal. The finals however, were a great disappointment. Sweden lost their opening game on 10 June against the host Belgium 1–2. Johan Mjällby scored the goal for Sweden in the 53rd minute after an error by Belgian goalkeeper Filip De Wilde, while Belgium won via goals from Bart Goor in the 43rd minute and Émile Mpenza in the 46th. Then on 15 June Sweden played 0–0 against Turkey. On 19 June, Sweden lost 2–1 to eventual runners-up Italy in the last group stage match. Luigi Di Biagio scored with a header on a corner kick in the first half to give Italy the lead. Late in the second half, Henrik Larsson equalised to 1–1. But after Daniel Andersson lost control of the ball, Alessandro Del Piero shot it into the top corner. Sweden finished the group last behind Belgium with only 1 point. Italy finished first and Turkey second.

Sweden qualified undefeated for the 2002 FIFA World Cup, ahead of eventual third placed Turkey. Sweden was drawn in the "group of death", Group F, which also featured big favourites Argentina, England and Nigeria. The first match was against England on 2 June. Sol Campbell gave England the lead in the first half by heading in a left-side corner from David Beckham. The equalising goal was scored by midfielder Niclas Alexandersson, a powerful left-foot shot from outside the box past David Seaman. The match ended 1–1. In the next game on 7 June, Sweden played Nigeria. Julius Aghahowa gave Nigeria the lead by heading in a cross from the right. Sweden managed to equalise with a goal by Henrik Larsson. Later in the game, Larsson was fouled in the penalty area and Sweden were awarded with a penalty which Larsson himself put in the goal. Sweden won 2–1.

In the final group match on 12 June, Sweden played Argentina, who needed to win after losing 0–1 to England in the previous game. Sweden midfielder Anders Svensson scored a freekick goal from 30 meters. Andreas Andersson had a shot off the crossbar and out in an attempt to extend the lead. Mattias Jonson committed a foul in the penalty area and Argentina was awarded a penalty. Ariel Ortega shot straight on Magnus Hedman, the Sweden national team keeper, but Hernán Crespo rushed into the box and shot the rebound from Hedman between the keeper's legs. The goal was controversial because Crespo began running into the box at the same time as Ortega stepped up to shoot. However, the match ended 1–1 and Sweden won the group, England on second place, Argentina third and Nigeria last.

In the round of 16 on 16 June, Sweden played Senegal. Henrik Larsson gave Sweden an early lead by heading in a corner from Anders Svensson. Senegal equalised through Henri Camara. They also had a goal disallowed for offside. The game came to sudden death golden goal. Rising star Zlatan Ibrahimović came on and nearly won Sweden the game. He made a terrific run on the right wing past several Senegal players, and shot with his weaker left foot from a tight angle straight at Senegal's keeper Tony Sylva. Ibrahimović had Larsson and Svensson in excellent positions for a pass, but shot instead. Then Svensson made a great spin past a defender and hit the post with a powerful shot, which Sylva would have had no chance of saving, had it gone inside the posts. Camara then took a weak shot which went past Hedman, off the post and into the goal. Consequently, Sweden were eliminated. Henrik Larsson announced his retirement from the national team after the tournament.

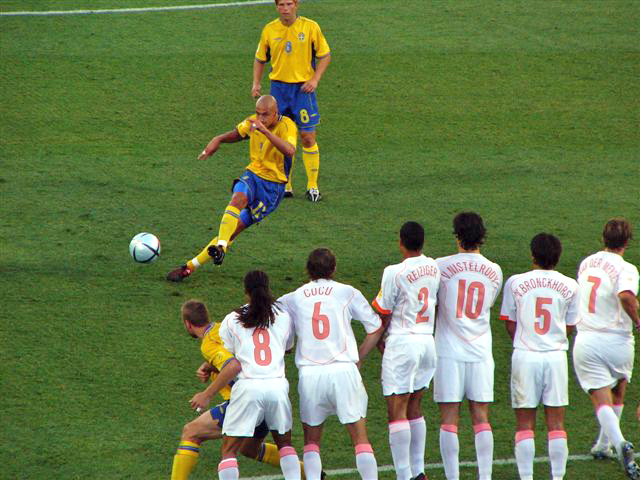
Sweden's Henrik Larsson taking a free kick against the Netherlands in the UEFA Euro 2004 quarter-finals

Despite another impressive qualifying campaign and the unexpected return of Henrik Larsson, Sweden came into the tournament in Portugal with low expectations. But after a dazzling 5–0 win against Bulgaria on 14 June, they became one of the favorites. Freddie Ljungberg began the goal-fest after a well done pass by Zlatan Ibrahimović. Henrik Larsson scored 2–0 and 3–0 in the second half. His first goal was a diving header after a perfectly taken crossball from the left by Erik Edman. 4–0 was scored by Zlatan Ibrahimović on a penalty and the substitute Marcus Allbäck scored the last goal of the game. After the 5–0 victory, Sweden became a feared team in the tournament and many were surprised by Sweden's offensive play since they were known to mostly play a defensive form of football.

In the next game on 18 June, they were set up against Italy, who would prove themselves as a very hard opponent. After 36 minutes Antonio Cassano scored the first goal of the game for Italy after a cross by Christian Panucci. A great game by Sweden national team goalkeeper Andreas Isaksson made Sweden survive the rest of the game and after 84 minutes, Zlatan Ibrahimović scored a backheel goal to make it 1–1, which became the final score.

Sweden's last game of the group was held against Denmark. It was said before the game that if Sweden and Denmark played 2–2, Italy would be eliminated from the tournament. This is exactly what happened. Denmark led the game by 2–1 for a long time. But at the end of the game, Mattias Jonson scored the equaliser after numerous rebounds. Italy was eliminated and both Denmark and Sweden was qualified for the quarter-finals.

In the quarter-finals on 26 June, Sweden played against Holland. The game became goalless after full-time, but not without a lot of chances. The closest Sweden came to scoring was through Freddie Ljungberg but he hit the post with a well taken shot. Henrik Larsson also hit the cross bar from close range. After a goalless extra time, the game went to a penalty shootout. After a long run of penalties were taken, it was Olof Mellberg's turn to take a shot. The Dutch goalkeeper Edwin van der Sar saved Mellberg's shot and Sweden lost the penalty shoot out after Arjen Robben converted the following penalty.

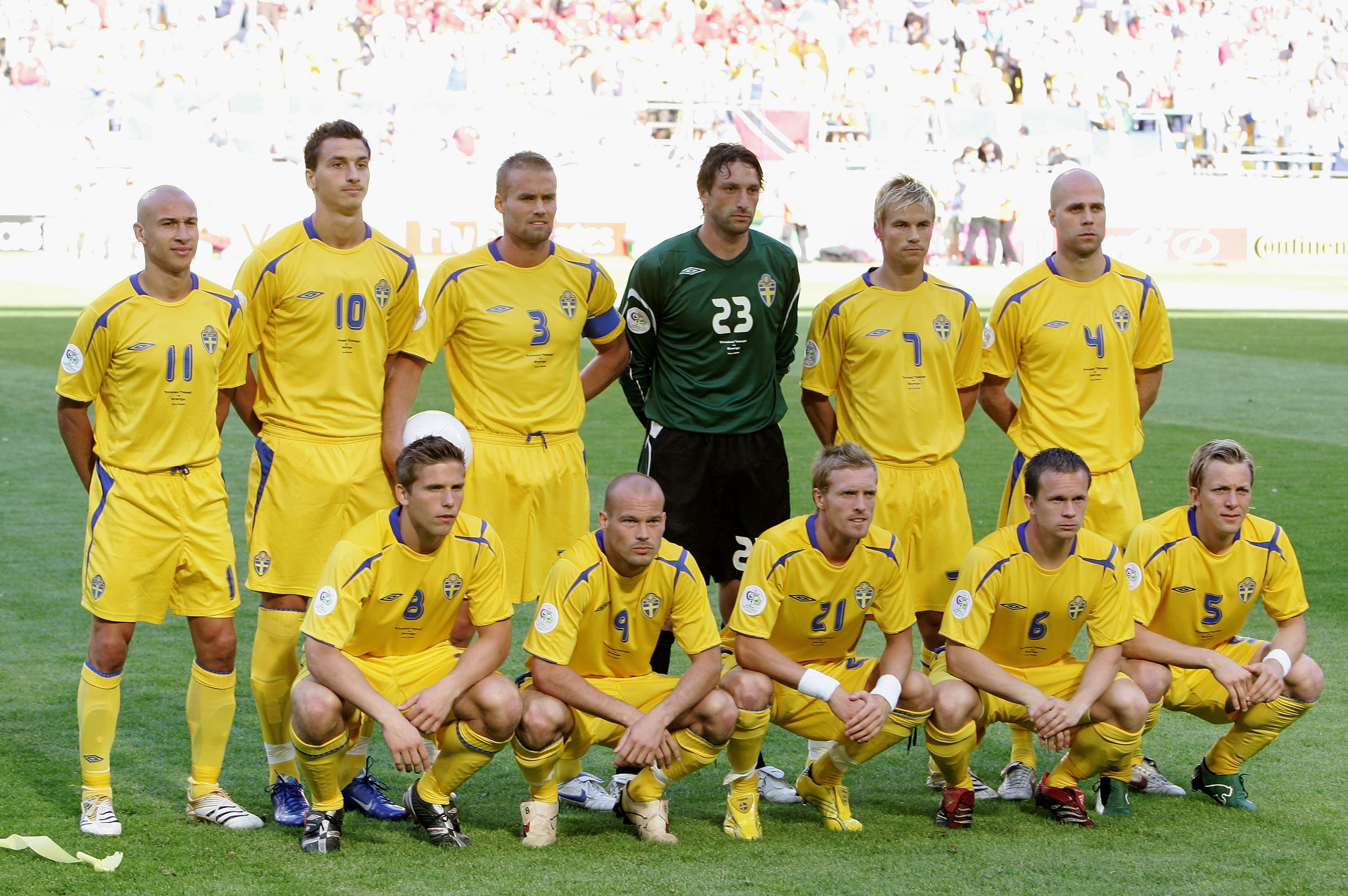
Sweden national team of 2006

Sweden qualified for the World Cup as the best runner-up, behind Croatia, who won their qualifying group. At the World Cup draw in December 2005, Sweden were drawn in Group B together with England, Paraguay and Trinidad and Tobago. Their squad for the tournament featured players who played club football in eleven different nations. Sweden started the World Cup slowly, recording a goalless draw on 10 June in Dortmund against unheralded Trinidad and Tobago, despite playing with a one-man advantage for most of the game. The second game, against Paraguay on 15 June in Berlin, looked to be another goalless draw until Freddie Ljungberg scored with a header in the 89th minute to give Sweden a 1–0 victory. On 20 June, Sweden played their last group stage match against England in Cologne. Joe Cole scored 1–0 for England with a spectacular long range shot in the 34th minute. Marcus Allbäck equalised to 1–1 with a header in the 51st minute. When Steven Gerrard scored with a header in the 85th minute, it looked like England would win the game. However, Henrik Larsson made it 2–2 from close range in the 90th minute. The draw was enough for Sweden to go through to the round of 16. On 24 June, Sweden's World Cup run came to an end with a 2–0 defeat to the host nation, Germany in Munich, after two early goals by Lukas Podolski. Defender Teddy Lučić was controversely sent off by referee Carlos Simon, who was captured laughing while holding up a questionable red card. Henrik Larsson missed a penalty kick early in the second half. After the tournament, Mattias Jonson and Teddy Lučić announced they had retired from the national team. On 17 July, Henrik Larsson retired for a second time from the national team.

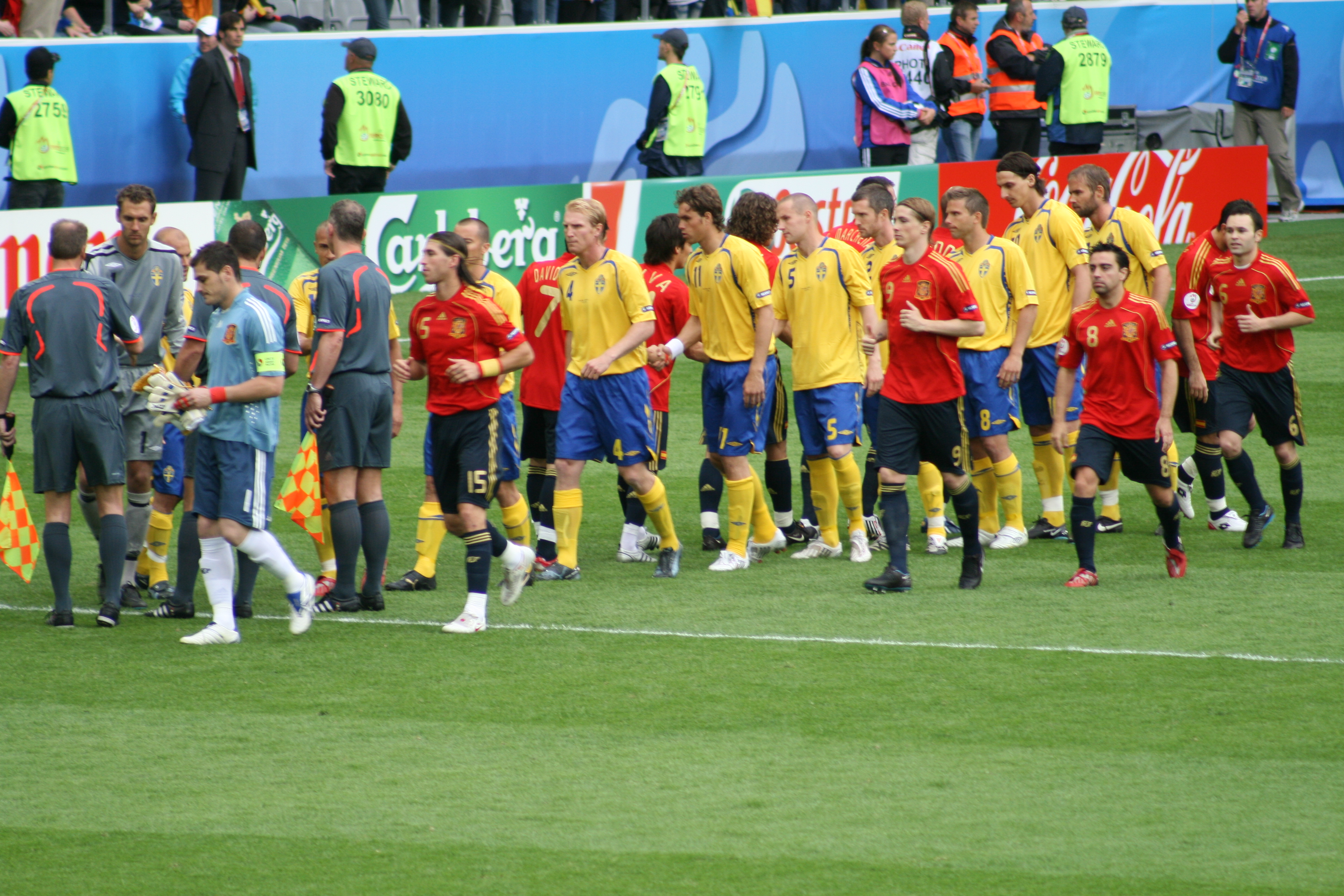
Sweden and Spain meet in UEFA Euro 2008 Group D

Sweden finished second in Group F behind Spain, and qualified for the Euro 2008 finals as the best runner up. The qualifying campaign included an abandoned match away to Denmark, for which Sweden were awarded a 3–0 win by UEFA.

Prior to the final tournament, Henrik Larsson made another sensational return to the national team, nearly aged 37. Sweden were drawn in Group D together with Spain, Greece and Russia. In their first match in Euro 2008 on 10 June, they beat the reigning European champions, Greece, by a score of 2–0 with goals from Zlatan Ibrahimović and Petter Hansson. Their next game was against Spain on 14 June. The game looked like a draw until a 92nd-minute strike from David Villa, which put the Spaniards ahead. In the final group match on 18 June, the Swedes went on to lose 2–0 to the Russians, eliminating them from the tournament. Freddie Ljungberg, Marcus Allbäck and Niclas Alexandersson all chose to retire from the national team after Sweden was eliminated.

=== 2010s ===
The 2010 FIFA World Cup qualification ended disastrously for Sweden. In the first game in Tirana, they were only able to tie 0–0 with Albania that they were expected to defeat easily. Four days later, Sweden beat Hungary, 2–1, with goals from Kim Källström and Samuel Holmén. They would go on to tie with Portugal twice, both in Stockholm and in Porto. Both games ended 0–0. Sweden would lose to Denmark on home ground with an early strike from Thomas Kahlenberg after a defensive mistake by Mikael Nilsson. Kim Källström had a penalty kick saved early in the first half, which proved to be decisive. Sweden recovered with a 4–0 hammering of Malta. Against Hungary and Malta, both of the winning goals for Sweden were scored late. They would lose to Denmark again at Parken Stadium in Copenhagen after a late goal from Jakob Poulsen. Meanwhile, Portugal defeated Hungary, 3–0, putting the Portuguese team ahead in the standings. Sweden would defeat Albania, 4–1; however, Sweden was eliminated by Portugal's 4–0 defeat of Malta. Lars Lagerbäck resigned and Erik Hamrén was appointed the next head coach. Several veteran players chose to retire after Sweden failed to reach the World Cup, including Daniel Andersson, Mikael Nilsson and Henrik Larsson, his third and final retirement. Zlatan Ibrahimović took a break from the national team due to Sweden missing the World Cup. He returned almost a year later, in August 2010, and was named Sweden captain by the new coach Hamrén.

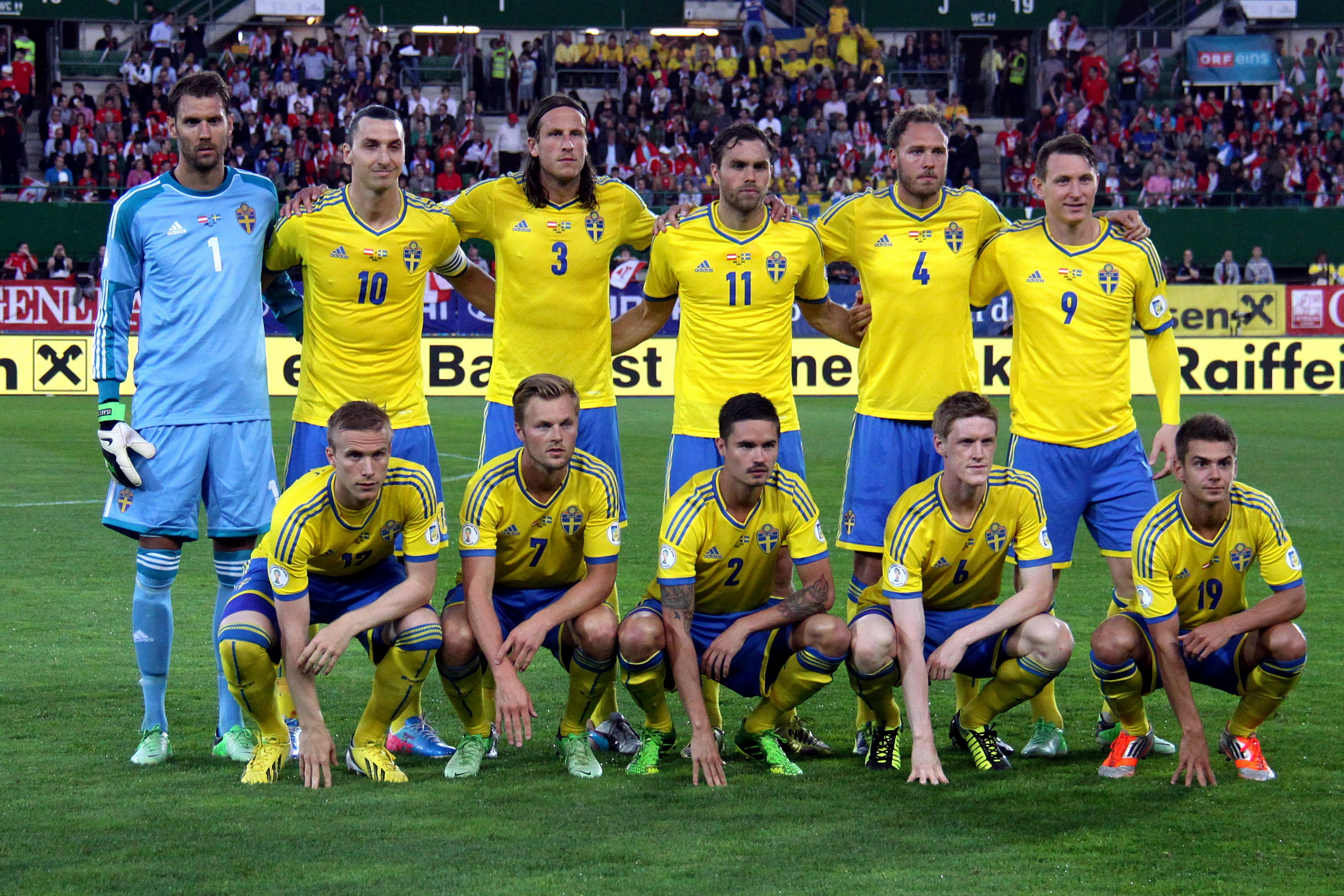
The Sweden national team before playing against Austria in 2013 during the 2014 FIFA World Cup qualifiers

Sweden's Euro 2012 campaign with their new coach, Erik Hamrén, started well with two consecutive wins in Group E against Hungary and San Marino. After that Sweden lost to the Netherlands in Amsterdam with 1–4, but then won against Moldova first in Stockholm with 2–1 and later in Chișinău with 4–1. After the battle against Moldova Sweden beat their neighbor Finland with 5–0. The following game was a defeat when Hungary through Rudolf scored 2–1 home at Stadium Puskás Ferenc at the last minute of full-time. After that Sweden defeated San Marino with 5–0 away including two goals from Christian Wilhelmsson, who before the two games against San Marino and Hungary hadn't been a regular in the starting eleven during Hamréns tenure as head coach. The Sweden national team then proceeded to beat Finland with 2–1 and in the final game beat the Netherlands with 3–2 to end their streak of 17 consecutive qualification-game wins. On 2 December 2011, Sweden were drawn into Group D alongside England, Ukraine and France in the Euro 2012 competition.

Sweden played their opening match on 11 June against Ukraine. Zlatan Ibrahimović scored from close range after a pass from Kim Källström in the 52nd minute. Andriy Shevchenko equalised by heading in a corner just three minutes later, and in the 62nd minute, he scored another header. Sweden were unable to respond to this and lost the match 1–2. Sweden played their second group stage match against England on 15 June. Andy Carroll scored 1–0 for England with a powerful header in the 23rd minute. Sweden equalised through an own goal by Glen Johnson and took the lead when Olof Mellberg scored 2–1 in the 59th minute. However, England turned the game around with goals by Theo Walcott and Danny Welbeck. The two losses meant that Sweden were already eliminated from the next stage. In the third group stage game on 19 June, Sweden played against France. Zlatan Ibrahimović scored a spectacular flying volley early in the second half and Sebastian Larsson sealed a meaningless 2–0 win during stoppage time. After Sweden's early exit from the tournament, the veteran Olof Mellberg announced his retirement from the national team.

Playing in Group C of the 2014 FIFA World Cup qualifiers, Sweden finished second behind Germany, and was one of eight teams to move on to the second round of qualification. A notable result during group play was their match in Germany on 16 October 2012 where they fought back from 4–0 down with 30 minutes remaining to draw the game 4–4 at the Olympiastadion, and was widely regarded as one of the most memorable comebacks in football history.

Sweden's new national stadium Friends Arena in Solna was opened on 14 November 2012 with a friendly match against England, which Sweden won 4–2. Zlatan Ibrahimović scored four goals in a world class performance. His fourth goal was an extraordinary overhead bicycle kick from 35 yards, which later won the FIFA Puskás Award for goal of the year.

A key win in their group was the home game against Austria on 11 October 2013, as Martin Olsson and Zlatan Ibrahimović both scored in the second half to secure the win at the Friends Arena.

Using the October 2013 FIFA World Rankings, Sweden was ranked 25th overall and would face one of the four highest ranked teams in the second round of qualification. They were drawn to face Portugal, the team that beat Sweden for a qualification spot in the 2010 World Cup qualifiers. Cristiano Ronaldo scored the only goal in a 1–0 win for Portugal the first match in Lisbon on 15 November. The return match was played on 19 November at Friends Arena in Solna. After Ronaldo scored 1–0 for Portugal, Zlatan Ibrahimović scored two quick goals to make it 2–2 on aggregate. Sweden still needed to score a third goal because of Portugal's away goal. However, Ronaldo scored two more counter-attack goals and Portugal won the game 3–2 and 4–2 on aggregate. This meant that Sweden once again failed to qualify for the World Cup. Due to this, Sweden's most capped player of all time Anders Svensson decided to end his international career.

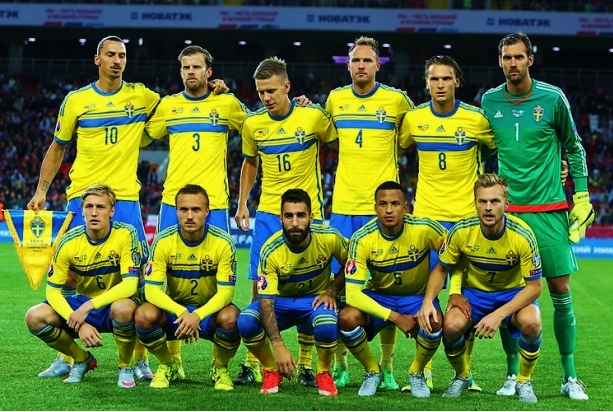
The Sweden national team before playing against Russia in 2015 during the Euro 2016 qualifiers

Competing in Group G of the UEFA Euro 2016 qualifiers, Sweden picked up their first point on the road against Austria with a 1–1 draw on 8 September 2014. After a 1–1 draw against Russia at the Friends Arena, Sweden then picked up their first win in their next match with a 2–0 result against Liechtenstein. Sweden then went unbeaten for another three matches before suffering two consecutive defeats, a 1–0 loss to Russia in Moscow and a crushing 4–1 home defeat to group leaders Austria. This caused Sweden to move down to third place in their group, just one point above fourth-placed Montenegro. Sweden then bounced back to win their final two group games against Liechtenstein and Moldova with the scoreline being 2–0 on both occasions. They finished their group in third position behind Austria and Russia and qualified for the playoffs. Sweden were drawn against big rivals Denmark and won 4–3 on aggregate, qualifying for the UEFA Euro 2016. They were, however, eliminated from the group stage, losing to Italy and Belgium, drawing with the Republic of Ireland and scoring no goals of their own (their only goal was an own goal by Ciaran Clark).

On 25 July 2015, Sweden were drawn in Group A of 2018 FIFA World Cup qualification. The team scored six wins, a draw and three losses. As a result, they tied with the Netherlands in points, and claimed second place behind eventual world champions France on goal difference.

On 13 November 2017, Sweden qualified for the 2018 World Cup after a 0–0 draw away to Italy at the San Siro during the second leg of their qualification playoff match. As Sweden had won the first match 1–0, this resulted in a Sweden national team win on aggregate, making their return to the World Cup for the first time in 12 years.

At the 2018 World Cup, Sweden started its campaign by a 1–0 win over South Korea in the first match on 18 June, through a penalty goal by Andreas Granqvist, decided by the new VAR technology. Their second match on 23 June was against Germany. Ola Toivonen scored 1–0 for Sweden by lobbing the ball over the German goalkeeper Manuel Neuer in the first half. However, Marco Reus equalised to 1–1 early on in the second half. With 15 seconds remaining on the five stoppage time minutes, Toni Kroos won the game for Germany by scoring a free kick from just outside the penalty area, after a foul by Jimmy Durmaz. Despite this loss, Sweden advanced to the knockout stage top of the group with a 3–0 win over Mexico, while Germany were knocked out bottom of the group with a 2–0 loss to South Korea.

On 3 July 2018, Sweden played Switzerland in the round of 16, beating them 1–0 with a goal by Emil Forsberg, and advancing to the quarter finals for the first time since 1994. In the quarter-finals, Sweden suffered a 2–0 defeat to England and was thus knocked out.

Sweden were drawn with Turkey and Russia in the League B. Sweden started their campaign on 10 September with a 2–3 defeat against Turkey in Solna, after leading 2–1 with only a few minutes remaining. A month later, Sweden earned a point in a 0–0 draw against Russia in Kaliningrad. With two matches remaining, Sweden had to win both to top the group and to be promoted to the 2020–21 UEFA Nations League A. On 17 November, Sweden beat Turkey with 1–0 in Konya after a penalty goal from captain Andreas Granqvist. Three days later, they achieved a 2–0 victory over Russia in Solna. The two wins meant promotion for Sweden to League A and a guaranteed playoff spot for the UEFA Euro 2020, should they not qualify directly via the regular qualification process.

=== 2020s ===
The draw for the UEFA Euro 2020 qualifying saw Sweden placed in Group F with Spain, Norway, Romania, Faroe Islands and Malta. On 15 November, Sweden defeated Romania 2–0 in Bucharest. The win meant that Sweden had secured second place in the group and a spot at UEFA Euro 2020, their sixth consecutive European championship.

For UEFA Euro 2020, Sweden were drawn in Group E together with Spain, Poland, and Slovakia. At the delayed final tournament, held in 2021, Sweden opened their campaign with an impressive 0–0 draw with Spain in Seville. Four days later, Sweden would face off against Slovakia in Saint Petersburg. The match provided no goals until the 77th minute where Emil Forsberg slotted home the winning penalty after Slovak goalkeeper, Martin Dúbravka, took out Robin Quaison in the box, this win confirmed Sweden's path to the knockout stages. On 23 June, Sweden finished their group campaign with a 3–2 win against Poland. Sweden would face off against Ukraine in the round of 16 on 29 June in Glasgow. The match finished 1–1 in normal time. Late in extra time, a header from Artem Dovbyk in the 120th-minute would eliminate the Swedes.

Promoted to League A, Sweden were drawn in Group A3 with Portugal, France and Croatia. Despite a 2–1 home win against Croatia, Sweden would be relegated to League B due to an inferior goal difference.

For the 2022 FIFA World Cup qualification, Sweden were drawn in Group B along with Spain, Greece, Georgia and Kosovo. On 16 March 2021, Zlatan Ibrahimović was included in the squad for the first time in almost five years, following his retirement from the national team after Euro 2016. On 25 March 2021, Sweden beat Georgia 1–0 at Friends Arena after a goal by Viktor Claesson, with Ibrahimović providing the assist. With his 117th appearance, Ibrahimović officially became Sweden's oldest player of all time at the age of 39 years, five months and 22 days, taking over Thomas Ravelli's record from 11 October 1997. On 2 September, Sweden beat Spain 2–1 in Solna. This was the first time Spain had been beaten in a World Cup qualifier since 1993.

On 11 November, Sweden suffered a shock 2–0 loss against Georgia, the lowest ranked team to have ever defeated Sweden. On 14 November, Sweden played the return fixture against Spain in Seville where they had to win. Despite creating the best chances to score, Sweden lost the match 1–0 after Álvaro Morata scored on a rebound in the 86th minute. This meant that Sweden finished second place in the group, and entered the playoff round as one of six seeded teams in late March 2022. On 24 March, Sweden played against Czech Republic in the playoff semi-final in Solna. The game was scoreless after 90 minutes and went into extra time, where Robin Quaison scored the winning goal. On 29 March, Sweden lost 2–0 to Poland at the Stadion Śląski due to goals from Robert Lewandowski and Piotr Zieliński and thus failed to qualify for the World Cup.

Sweden competed in League B of the Nations League against Norway, Serbia, and Slovenia. Their campaign started in a promising way with a 2–0 away win against Slovenia. However, they subsequently suffered four straight losses before only managing a draw at home to Slovenia. This meant that Sweden suffered back-to-back relegations as finished last in their group and were relegated to League C for the 2024–25 UEFA Nations League.

Their terrible Nations League form meant that Sweden realistically had to qualify directly for UEFA Euro 2024 by finishing in the top two. They were drawn in Group F with Belgium, Austria, Azerbaijan, and Estonia for UEFA Euro 2024 qualifying. However, Sweden performed poorly throughout their qualifying campaign – notably suffering a shocking 3–0 loss to Azerbaijan. Furthermore, one draw and a loss against Belgium and two losses to Austria severely damaged their chances of qualification, leading to Sweden failing to qualify for Euro 2024 after Austria beat Azerbaijan 1–0 in Baku, marking their first failure to qualify for the European Championship since 1996. As a result, Janne Andersson announced he would resign as Sweden's head coach, doing so after the final match against Estonia.

On 26 February 2024, the Swedish FA announced that former Danish player Jon Dahl Tomasson had been appointed as manager of the Sweden national team, effective from 1 March 2024. Tomasson's contract included the 2026 FIFA World Cup qualification and would be extended if Sweden would qualify for the World Cup. Tomasson was Sweden's first foreign manager since George Raynor who led Sweden in the 1950 and 1958 World Cups.

Tomasson led Sweden to victory in Group 1 of the 2024–25 UEFA Nations League C. However, after taking only 1 point in four matches in the 2026 FIFA World Cup qualifiers, Tomasson was sacked by the Swedish FA on 14 October 2025, following a 1–0 home defeat to Kosovo. This marked the first time that a manager for Sweden had been sacked. On 20 October, Graham Potter was appointed as Tomasson's replacement. Despite finishing at the bottom at the qualifiers, Sweden still advanced to the playoffs via Nations League position.

On 26 March 2026, Sweden beat Ukraine 3–1 in the 2026 World Cup playoff semi-finals in Valencia, Spain. They then faced Poland in the final, beating them 3–2 in Solna, thus qualifying for the World Cup.

In their opening match of the 2026 World Cup, Sweden beat Tunisia 5–1. In their second match Sweden suffered a 1–5 defeat against the Netherlands. In the Round of 32, Sweden suffered a 3–0 defeat to France.

== Team image ==
=== Supporters ===
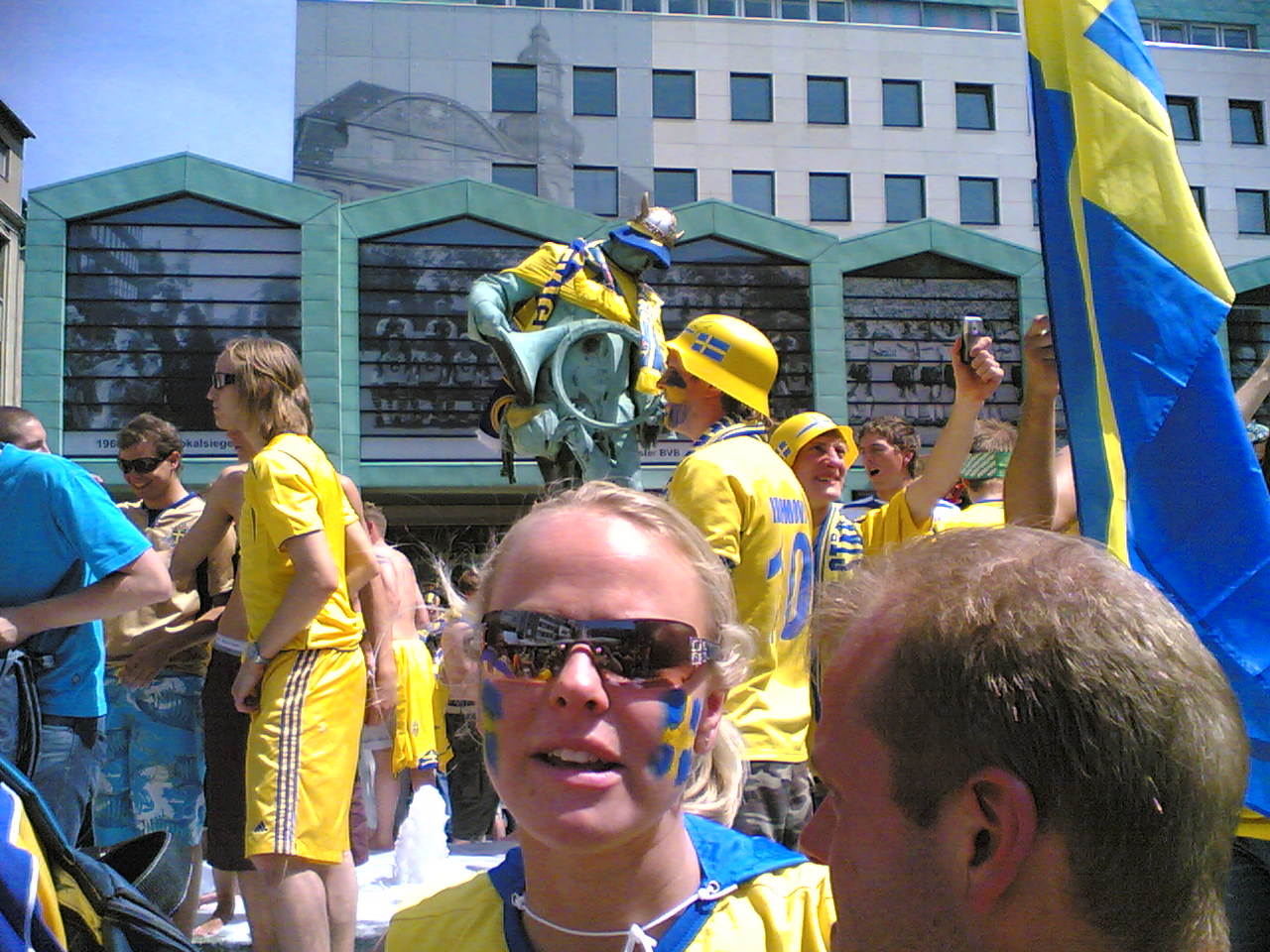
Sweden national team supporters during the 2006 FIFA World Cup in Dortmund, Germany

Sweden national team supporters showed up first during the 1912 Summer Olympics, where they chanted "Heja Sverige / friskt humör / det är det som susen gör" (roughly meaning "Come on, Sweden / being in good spirits is what does the trick") during the football games.

The traveling supporters for Sweden's away games showed up for the first time in the 1974 FIFA World Cup in West Germany, and since then Sweden has always had supporters in large tournaments. In the 2006 FIFA World Cup in Germany, Sweden had one of the largest group of supporters during a tournament, especially during the group stage match against Paraguay with around 50,000 Sweden national team supporters in attendance, plus an additional 50,000 fans watching the game outside the stadium. The Sweden national team fans were also voted the best fans during the 2006 World Cup, due to their massive numbers, friendly attitude and love for the game.

Since 2004, Camp Sweden has organised gatherings around matches. In 2017, another organisation, Gula väggen (lit. 'the Yellow Wall'), also started organising gatherings. Gula väggen, a limited company, had Andreas Richt – who was the son of the then head of football of the national team, Lars Richt – as one of its owners. Gula väggen, which had been a common term used by different supporter groups for the Swedish fans, registered their name as a trademark. It was found Gula väggen profiles such as "Kannan", "GV-Sara", "Hasse Kongo", and "Jan-Tommy" were paid to support Sweden. Camp Sweden stopped using the term Gula väggen to refer to their activities.

=== Rivalry ===
Sweden's main rival is Denmark. The countries have played against each other 107 times, of which Sweden have won 47, drawn 20 and lost 40. The first match between the teams was an 8–0 Denmark win in May 1913. Sweden had their first win in October 1916 by the score 4–0. The first competitive match between the countries was as 1–0 win for Sweden in the group stage of UEFA Euro 1992. In UEFA Euro 2004 the teams drew 2–2 in the last group stage match, ensuring that both teams advanced at the expense of Italy. In the qualification for UEFA Euro 2008, Sweden were awarded a 3–0 win away against Denmark after a Danish fan invaded the pitch and attacked the referee. Sweden qualified for the final tournament. In the qualification for the 2010 FIFA World Cup, Sweden lost both matches against Denmark by 1–0 and failed to qualify for the World Cup. In the playoffs round of the qualification for UEFA Euro 2016, Sweden defeated Denmark by 4–3 on aggregate to qualify for the final tournament. The most recent match between the countries was won by Denmark by 2–0.

=== Kit sponsorship ===
Sweden traditionally wears yellow shirts, blue shorts, and yellow socks as their home kit, and their away kit is in reverse order: blue shirts, yellow shorts, and blue socks, though the color of the shorts are interchangeable if there is any minor clash. Since 2013, their kit manufacturer is Adidas, who were also the manufacturer between 1973 and 2003. They were manufactured by Umbro in 1970 as well as between 2003 and 2013.

Kit supplier	Period
(United Kingdom) Umbro	1970 FIFA World Cup
(Germany) Adidas	1974–2003
(United Kingdom) Umbro	2003–2013
(Germany) Adidas	2013–present

=== Home stadium ===
Since 2012, the Swedish national stadium is Nationalarenan, replacing Råsunda Fotbollsstadion which was demolished. According to FIFA, Råsunda Stadion was a classic stadium, one of only two stadiums in the world, the other one being the Rose Bowl Stadium in Pasadena, California, which hosted both the men's and women's World Cup final (1958 FIFA World Cup final and the 1995 FIFA Women's World Cup). Råsunda stadium was opened 18 September 1910, and had a capacity of only 2,000, mostly standing. It was Råsunda stadium and Valhalla stadium in Gothenburg that were the first football fields with grass used for Sweden national team football. The stadium was expanded during 1937, to a capacity of 40,000 people. It was used for the football tournament in the 1912 Summer Olympics held in Stockholm, and hosted eight games during the 1958 FIFA World Cup. At the 1992 UEFA European Championship, the stadium hosted four games and in the 1995 FIFA Women's World Cup it hosted only the final game. Ullevi in Gothenburg is used for some home games, such as the centennial game of the Swedish Football Association against England in 2004. Even other stadiums, such as Stadion in Malmö, are used for the national team.

== Results and fixtures ==
The following is a list of match results in the last 12 months, as well as any future matches that have been scheduled.

Win Draw Loss Fixture

=== 2026 ===
26 March 2026 2026 FIFA World Cup play-offs	Ukraine	1–3	Sweden	Valencia, Spain (Note: Due to the Russian invasion of Ukraine, Ukraine are required to play their home matches at neutral venues until further notice.)
20:45 UTC+1	Ponomarenko 90'	Report	Gyökeres 6', 51', 73' (pen.)	Stadium: Estadi Ciutat de València; Attendance: 18,846; Referee: João Pinheiro (Portugal)

31 March 2026 2026 FIFA World Cup play-offs	Sweden	3–2	Poland	Solna, Sweden
20:45 UTC+2	Elanga 20'; Lagerbielke 44'; Gyökeres 88'	Report	Zalewski 33'; Świderski 55'	Stadium: Nationalarenan; Attendance: 49,627; Referee: Slavko Vinčić (Slovenia)

1 June 2026 Friendly	Norway	3–1	Sweden	Oslo, Norway
19:00 UTC+2	Strand Larsen 9', 37'; Nusa 18'	Report	Isak 76'	Stadium: Ullevaal Stadion; Attendance: 25,138; Referee: Balázs Berke (Hungary)

4 June 2026 Friendly	Sweden	2–2	Greece	Solna, Sweden
19:00 UTC+2	Gyökeres 53'; Nilsson 69'	Report	Tsimikas 10'; Masouras 90+5'	Stadium: Nationalarenan; Attendance: 39,139; Referee: Aaron Wyn Jones (Wales)

14 June 2026 2026 FIFA World Cup Group F	Sweden	5–1	Tunisia	Guadalupe, Nuevo León, Mexico
20:00 UTC−6	Ayari 7', 90+6'; Isak 30'; Gyökeres 59'; Svanberg 84'	Report	Rekik 43'	Stadium: Estadio BBVA; Attendance: 50,987; Referee: Yael Falcón (Argentina)

20 June 2026 2026 FIFA World Cup Group F	Netherlands	5–1	Sweden	Houston, Texas, United States
12:00 UTC−5	Brobbey 5', 17'; Gakpo 47', 54'; Summerville 89'	Report	Elanga 59'	Stadium: NRG Stadium; Attendance: 68,777; Referee: Michael Oliver (England)

25 June 2026 2026 FIFA World Cup Group F	Japan	1–1	Sweden	Arlington, Texas, United States
18:00 UTC−5	Maeda 56'	Report	Elanga 62'	Stadium: AT&T Stadium; Attendance: 70,137; Referee: Iván Barton (El Salvador)

30 June 2026 2026 FIFA World Cup R32	France	3–0	Sweden	East Rutherford, New Jersey, United States
17:00 UTC−4	Mbappé 45', 74'; Barcola 53'	Report		Stadium: MetLife Stadium; Attendance: 80,663; Referee: Danny Makkelie (Netherlands)

25 September 2026 2026–27 UEFA Nations League B	Sweden	2–1	Romania	Solna, Sweden
20:45 UTC+2	Isak 20'; Gyökeres 43'	Report	Man 29'	Stadium: Nationalarenan; Attendance: 31,882; Referee: Ondřej Berka (Czech Republic)

28 September 2026 2026–27 UEFA Nations League B	Sweden	3–1	Poland	Solna, Sweden
20:45 UTC+2	Nygren 8'; Ayari 64'; Gyökeres 72'	Report	Szymański 43'	Stadium: Nationalarenan; Attendance: 24,637; Referee: Javier Alberola Rojas (Spain)

2 October 2026 2026–27 UEFA Nations League B	Bosnia and Herzegovina	1–1	Sweden	Zenica, Bosnia and Herzegovina
20:45 UTC+2	Alajbegović 80'	Report	Gyökeres 61'	Stadium: Bilino Polje Stadium; Attendance: 11,700; Referee: Oleksii Derevinskyi (Ukraine)

5 October 2026 2026–27 UEFA Nations League B	Romania	0–1	Sweden	Bucharest, Romania
21:45 UTC+3		Report	Gyökeres 13'	Stadium: Arena Națională; Attendance: 49,426; Referee: Elchin Masiyev (Azerbaijan)

14 November 2026 2026–27 UEFA Nations League B	Sweden	3–2	Bosnia and Herzegovina	Solna, Sweden
20:45 UTC+1	Svensson 5'; Gyökeres 11' (pen.), 45+2' (pen.)	Report	Gigović 47'; Kolašinac 62'	Stadium: Nationalarenan; Attendance: 51,049; Referee: Simone Sozza (Italy)

17 November 2026 2026–27 UEFA Nations League B	Poland	1–1	Sweden	Wrocław, Poland
20:45 UTC+1	Benedyczak 16'	Report	Larsson 24'	Stadium: Wrocław Stadium; Attendance: 38,516; Referee: Felix Zwayer (Germany)

== Staff and management ==
=== Organisation ===
Position	Name
Chairman	(Sweden) Simon Åström
General secretary	(Sweden) Niclas Carlnén
Head of national teams	(Sweden) Kim Källström

=== Coaching staff ===
Graham Potter, the current head coach of the Sweden national team

As of 16 September 2026

Position	Name
Head coach	(England) Graham Potter
Assistant coaches	(Sweden) Andreas Georgson
Assistant coaches	(Sweden) Sebastian Larsson
Goalkeeping coach	(Sweden) Zlatan Azinović
Match analysts	(Sweden) Christoffer Bernspång
Match analysts	(Sweden) Sebastian Borg
Performance manager	(Sweden) Niklas Egnell
Physiotherapists	(Sweden) Fredrik Larsson
Physiotherapists	(Sweden) Henrik Nyhus
Physiotherapists	(Sweden) Calle Persson

=== Manager history ===
Chairmen of the Selection Committee

- 1908 Ludvig Kornerup
- 1909–1911 Wilhelm Friberg
- 1912 John Ohlson
- 1912–1913 Ruben Gelbord
- 1914–1915 Hugo Levin
- 1916 Frey Svenson
- 1917–1920 Anton Johanson
- 1921–1936 John Pettersson
- 1937 Carl Linde
- 1938–1942 Gustaf Carlson
- 1942 Selection Committee (caretaker)
- 1943–1956 Rudolf Kock
- 1957–1961 Eric Persson

Head coaches

- 1962–1965 Lennart Nyman
- 1966–1970 Orvar Bergmark
- 1971–1979 Georg Ericson
- 1980–1985 Lars Arnesson
- 1986–1990 Olle Nordin
- 1990 Nisse Andersson (caretaker)
- 1991–1997 Tommy Svensson
- 1998–1999 Tommy Söderberg
- 2000–2004 Lars Lagerbäck & Tommy Söderberg
- 2004–2009 Lars Lagerbäck
- 2009–2016 Erik Hamrén
- 2016–2023 Janne Andersson
- 2024 Daniel Bäckström (caretaker)
- 2024–2025 Jon Dahl Tomasson
- 2025– Graham Potter

== Players ==
=== Current squad ===
The following 23 players were called up for the 2026–27 UEFA Nations League matches against Bosnia and Herzegovina and Poland on 14 and 17 November 2026, respectively.

Caps and goals are correct as of 17 November 2026, after the match against Poland.

No.	Pos.	Player	Date of birth (age)	Caps	Goals	Club
1	GK	Jacob Widell Zetterström	11 July 1998 (age 28)	5	0	(The Football Association) Derby County
12	GK	Viktor Johansson	14 September 1998 (age 28)	17	0	(The Football Association) Stoke City
23	GK	Noel Törnqvist	1 February 2002 (age 24)	1	0	(Italian Football Federation) Monza
2	DF	Gustaf Lagerbielke	10 April 2000 (age 26)	17	2	(Portuguese Football Federation) Braga
3	DF	Victor Lindelöf (captain)	17 July 1994 (age 32)	86	3	(The Football Association) Aston Villa
4	DF	Eric Smith	8 January 1997 (age 29)	5	0	(German Football Association) FC St. Pauli
5	DF	Gabriel Gudmundsson	29 April 1999 (age 27)	33	0	(The Football Association) Leeds United
6	DF	Felix Beijmo	31 January 1998 (age 28)	3	0	(Danish Football Association) Copenhagen
7	DF	Elliot Stroud	22 June 2002 (age 24)	8	0	(The Football Association) Hull City
8	DF	Daniel Svensson	12 February 2002 (age 24)	21	1	(German Football Association) Borussia Dortmund
14	DF	Hjalmar Ekdal	21 October 1998 (age 28)	14	0	(The Football Association) Burnley
15	DF	Genesis Antwi	11 May 2007 (age 19)	1	0	(French Football Federation) Strasbourg
13	MF	Alexander Bernhardsson	8 September 1998 (age 28)	19	0	(German Football Association) VfL Wolfsburg
16	MF	Jesper Karlström	21 June 1995 (age 31)	32	0	(Italian Football Federation) Udinese
18	MF	Yasin Ayari	6 October 2003 (age 23)	29	6	(The Football Association) Brighton & Hove Albion
19	MF	Sebastian Nanasi	16 May 2002 (age 24)	15	3	(French Football Federation) Strasbourg
20	MF	Hugo Larsson	27 June 2004 (age 22)	17	1	(The Football Association) Fulham
21	MF	Dejan Kulusevski (vice-captain)	25 April 2000 (age 26)	47	5	(The Football Association) Tottenham Hotspur
9	FW	Alexander Isak	21 September 1999 (age 27)	64	19	(The Football Association) Liverpool
10	FW	Benjamin Nygren	8 July 2001 (age 25)	18	4	(Scottish Football Association) Celtic
11	FW	Anthony Elanga	27 April 2002 (age 24)	36	8	(The Football Association) Newcastle United
17	FW	Viktor Gyökeres	4 June 1998 (age 28)	43	27	(The Football Association) Arsenal
22	FW	Alieu Njie	14 May 2005 (age 21)	1	0	(Italian Football Federation) Fiorentina

=== Recent call-ups ===
The following 22 players have also been called up to the Sweden squad within the last twelve months.

Pos.	Player	Date of birth (age)	Caps	Goals	Club	Latest call-up
GK	Melker Ellborg	22 May 2003 (age 23)	0	0	(England) Sunderland	v. Romania, 5 October 2026
GK	Kristoffer Nordfeldt ^{RET}	23 June 1989 (age 37)	23	0	(Sweden) AIK	2026 FIFA World Cup
DF	Ken Sema	30 September 1993 (age 33)	35	5	(Cyprus) Pafos	v. Romania, 5 October 2026
DF	Carl Starfelt	1 June 1995 (age 31)	22	0	(Spain) Celta Vigo	v. Romania, 5 October 2026 ^{WD}
DF	Emil Holm	13 May 2000 (age 26)	17	2	(Italy) Bologna	v. Romania, 5 October 2026 ^{WD}
DF	Samuel Dahl	4 March 2003 (age 23)	3	0	(Portugal) Benfica	v. Romania, 5 October 2026
DF	Hampus Skoglund	1 March 2004 (age 22)	2	0	(Sweden) Hammarby IF	v. Romania, 5 October 2026
DF	Victor Eriksson	17 September 2000 (age 26)	1	0	(Sweden) Hammarby IF	v. Romania, 5 October 2026
DF	John Mellberg	30 July 2006 (age 20)	0	0	(Austria) Red Bull Salzburg	v. Romania, 5 October 2026 ^{WD}
DF	Isak Hien (3rd captain)	13 January 1999 (age 27)	32	0	(Italy) Atalanta	2026 FIFA World Cup
DF	Herman Johansson	16 October 1997 (age 29)	3	0	(United States) FC Dallas	2026 FIFA World Cup
MF	Besfort Zeneli	21 November 2002 (age 23)	13	0	(Belgium) Union Saint-Gilloise	v. Poland, 17 November 2026 ^{WD}
MF	Patrik Wålemark	14 October 2001 (age 25)	2	0	(Poland) Lech Poznań	v. Poland, 17 November 2026 ^{WD}
MF	Mattias Svanberg	5 January 1999 (age 27)	43	3	(Germany) VfL Wolfsburg	v. Romania, 5 October 2026 ^{WD}
MF	Lucas Bergvall	2 February 2006 (age 20)	18	0	(England) Tottenham Hotspur	v. Romania, 5 October 2026
MF	Taha Ali	1 July 1998 (age 28)	4	0	(Greece) PAOK	v. Romania, 5 October 2026 ^{WD}
MF	Hugo Bolin	24 July 2003 (age 23)	3	0	(Germany) Borussia Mönchengladbach	v. Romania, 5 October 2026
MF	Williot Swedberg	1 February 2004 (age 22)	3	0	(Spain) Celta Vigo	v. Romania, 5 October 2026
MF	Gustav Lundgren	18 April 1995 (age 31)	2	1	(Sweden) GAIS	v. Poland, 31 March 2026
FW	Gustaf Nilsson	23 May 1997 (age 29)	11	4	(Germany) Hertha BSC	v. Romania, 5 October 2026 ^{WD}
FW	Paulos Abraham	16 July 2002 (age 24)	0	0	(Sweden) Hammarby IF	v. Romania, 5 October 2026
FW	Roony Bardghji	15 November 2005 (age 21)	3	0	(Spain) Barcelona	v. Poland, 31 March 2026
Notes: ^{RET} = Retired from the national team; ^{WD} = Withdrew from the squad

=== Previous squads ===
FIFA World Cup

- 1934 World Cup squad
- 1938 World Cup squad
- 1950 World Cup squad
- 1958 World Cup squad
- 1970 World Cup squad
- 1974 World Cup squad
- 1978 World Cup squad
- 1990 World Cup squad
- 1994 World Cup squad
- 2002 World Cup squad
- 2006 World Cup squad
- 2018 World Cup squad
- 2026 World Cup squad

UEFA European Championship

- Euro 1992 squad
- Euro 2000 squad
- Euro 2004 squad
- Euro 2008 squad
- Euro 2012 squad
- Euro 2016 squad
- Euro 2020 squad

Olympic Games

- 1908 Olympics squad
- 1912 Olympics squad
- 1920 Olympics squad
- 1924 Olympics squad
- 1936 Olympics squad
- 1948 Olympics squad
- 1952 Olympics squad

== Player records ==
As of 17 November 2026.
Players in bold are still active with Sweden.

=== Most capped players ===
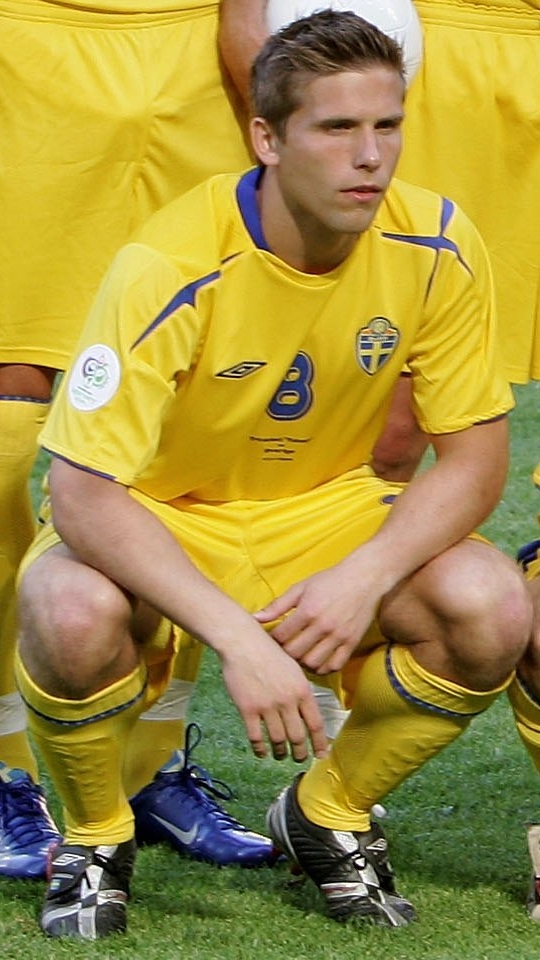
Anders Svensson is Sweden's most capped player of all time, with 148 appearances for the national team.

Rank	Player	Caps	Goals	Career
1	Anders Svensson	148	21	1999–2013
2	Thomas Ravelli	143	0	1981–1997
3	Andreas Isaksson	133	0	2002–2016
3	Sebastian Larsson	133	10	2008–2021
5	Kim Källström	131	16	2001–2016
6	Zlatan Ibrahimović	122	62	2001–2023
7	Olof Mellberg	117	8	2000–2012
8	Roland Nilsson	116	1	1986–2000
9	Björn Nordqvist	115	0	1963–1978
10	Niclas Alexandersson	109	7	1993–2008

=== Top goalscorers ===
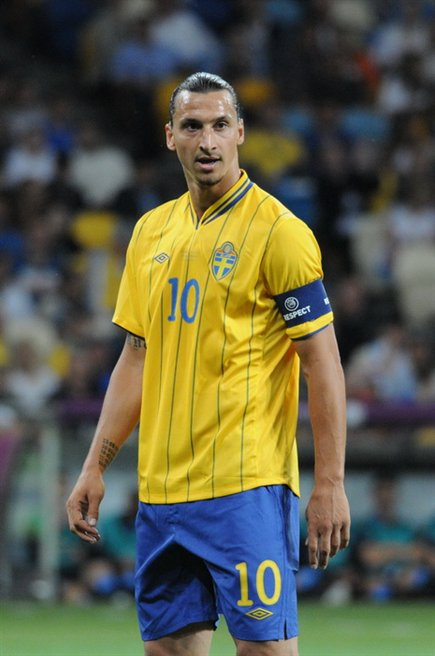
Zlatan Ibrahimović is Sweden's all-time top goalscorer, with 62 goals for the national team.

Rank	Player	Goals	Caps	Average	Career
1	Zlatan Ibrahimović (list)	62	122	0.51	2001–2023
2	Sven Rydell	49	43	1.14	1923–1932
3	Gunnar Nordahl	43	33	1.3	1942–1948
4	Henrik Larsson	37	106	0.35	1993–2009
5	Gunnar Gren	32	57	0.56	1940–1958
6	Kennet Andersson	31	83	0.37	1990–2000
7	Marcus Allbäck	30	74	0.41	1999–2008
8	Martin Dahlin	29	60	0.48	1991–1997
9	**Viktor Gyökeres**	27	43	0.63	2019–present
9	Tomas Brolin	27	47	0.57	1990–1995
9	Agne Simonsson	27	51	0.53	1957–1967

=== Age-related records ===
Age-related records of the Swedish national football team.

Oldest player
41 years, 5 months and 21 days – Zlatan Ibrahimović (0–3 against Belgium on 24 March 2023)
Youngest debutante
17 years, 2 months and 11 days – Gunnar Pleijel (5–2 against Finland on 22 October 1911)
Oldest debutante
34 years, 9 months and 1 day – Stendy Appeltoft (3–0 against Finland on 28 August 1955)
Longest national career
22 years, 1 month and 24 days – Zlatan Ibrahimović (from 31 January 2001 until 24 March 2023)
Oldest goalscorer
37 years, 11 months and 26 days – Gunnar Gren (two goals in a 4–4 draw against Denmark on 26 October 1958)
Youngest goalscorer
17 years, 3 months and 22 days – Alexander Isak (one goal in a 6–0 win against Slovakia on 12 January 2017)

=== Notable captains ===
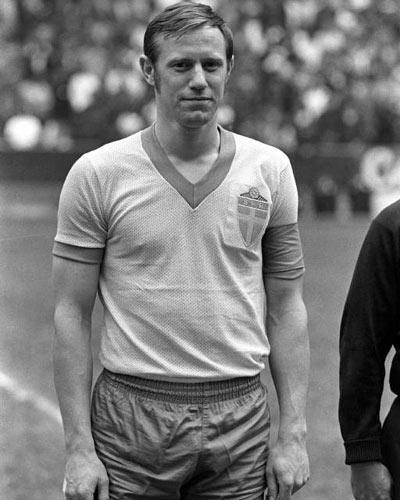
Björn Nordqvist, with 92 matches as team captain, is the Swedish player with the most captaincies.

Victor Lindelöf has captained Sweden since 2021.

This is a list of captains who either have played 30 or more matches as team captain or have played a match as team captain in a major tournament (FIFA World Cup, UEFA Euro and Olympic Games). Note that only players who started the match as captain are included in the list.

The order for this list is by most appearances as captain, then chronological order of first captaincy.

Player	First to last captaincy	Matches as captain	Major tournament(s)
Björn Nordqvist	1967–1978	92	2 matches in 1970 FIFA World Cup; 1 match in 1974 FIFA World Cup; 3 matches in 1978 FIFA World Cup
Zlatan Ibrahimović	2008–2016	58	3 matches in UEFA Euro 2012; 3 matches in UEFA Euro 2016
Jonas Thern	1989–1997	55	1 match in 1990 FIFA World Cup; 4 matches in UEFA Euro 1992; 5 matches in 1994 FIFA World Cup
Ingemar Erlandsson	1981–1985	47	—
Patrik Andersson	1995–2002	41	2 matches in UEFA Euro 2000
Orvar Bergmark	1959–1965	38	—
Erik Nilsson	1947–1952	37	5 matches in 1950 FIFA World Cup; 4 matches in 1952 Summer Olympics
**Victor Lindelöf**	2021–2026	37	4 matches in 2026 FIFA World Cup
Olof Mellberg	2002–2006	36	4 matches in UEFA Euro 2004; 4 matches in 2006 FIFA World Cup
Andreas Granqvist	2016–2019	33	5 matches in 2018 FIFA World Cup
Sven Friberg	1920–1928	30	4 matches in 1924 Summer Olympics
Bengt Gustavsson	1953–1962	29	1 match in 1958 FIFA World Cup
Glenn Hysén	1987–1990	23	2 matches in 1990 FIFA World Cup
Roland Nilsson	1989–2000	22	2 matches in 1994 FIFA World Cup
Johan Mjällby	1998–2004	17	1 match in UEFA Euro 2000; 4 matches in 2002 FIFA World Cup
Sebastian Larsson	2013–2021	14	4 matches in UEFA Euro 2020
Sven Jonasson	1935–1940	13	1 match in 1938 FIFA World Cup
Freddie Ljungberg	2006–2008	13	3 matches in UEFA Euro 2008
Bo Larsson	1973–1974	10	5 matches in 1974 FIFA World Cup
Ragnar Wicksell	1914–1921	9	1 match in 1920 Summer Olympics
Birger Rosengren	1945–1948	9	4 matches in 1948 Summer Olympics
Hans Lindman	1908–1911	6	2 matches in 1908 Summer Olympics
Herman Myhrberg	1911–1912	6	2 matches in 1912 Summer Olympics
Bertil Nordenskjöld	1915–1920	6	2 matches in 1920 Summer Olympics
Victor Carlund	1933–1936	6	1 match in 1936 Summer Olympics
Nils Rosén	1934	6	2 matches in 1934 FIFA World Cup
Nils Liedholm	1958	5	5 matches in 1958 FIFA World Cup
Tore Keller	1934–1938	4	2 matches in 1938 FIFA World Cup
Tommy Svensson	1970	2	1 match in 1970 FIFA World Cup
Gustaf Carlson	1924	1	1 match in 1924 Summer Olympics

== Competitive record ==
Champions Runners-up Third place Fourth place Tournament held on home soil

=== FIFA World Cup ===
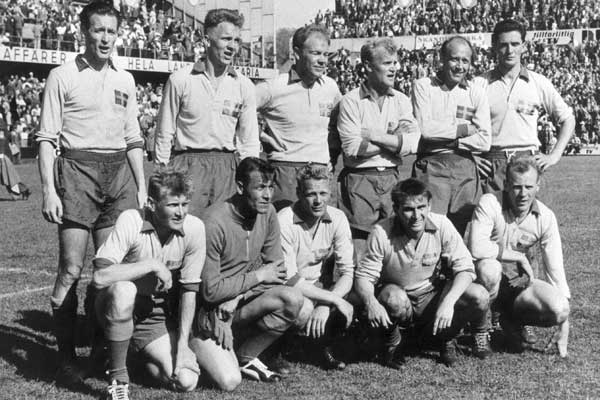
Sweden in the 1958 FIFA World Cup Final

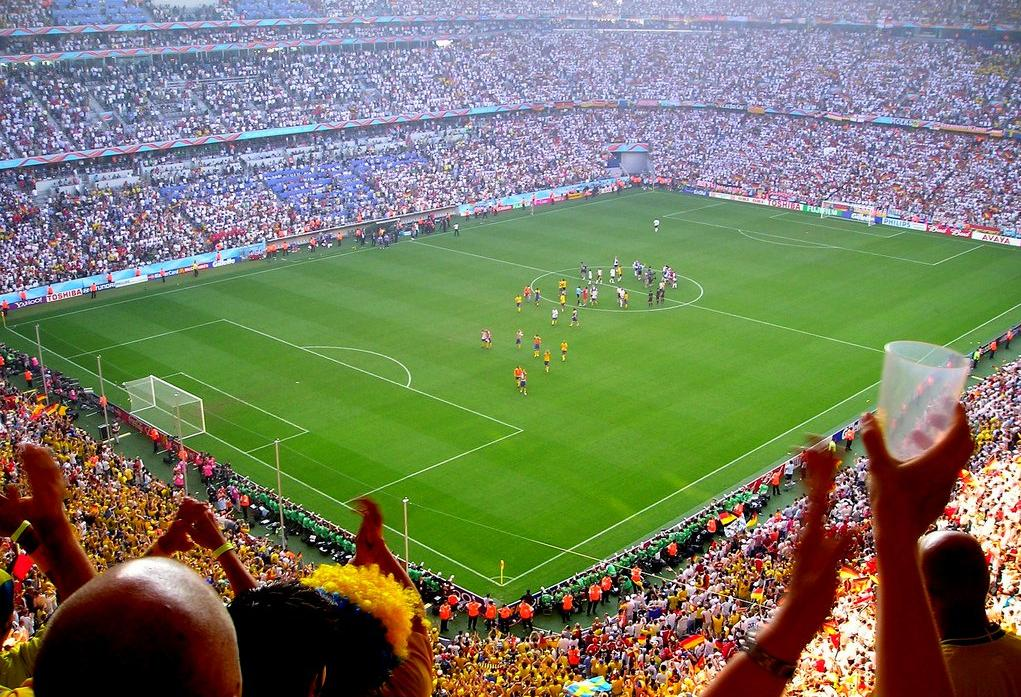
Sweden playing against Germany in the 2006 FIFA World Cup at Munich's Allianz Arena

FIFA World Cup record										Qualification record						
Year	Round	Position	Pld	W	D	L	GF	GA	Squad	Pld	W	D	L	GF	GA	Link
(Uruguay) 1930	Did not enter									No qualification						Link
(Italy) 1934	Quarter-finals	8th	2	1	0	1	4	4	Squad	2	2	0	0	8	2	Link
(France) 1938	Fourth place	4th	3	1	0	2	11	9	Squad	3	2	0	1	11	7	Link
(Brazil) 1950	Third place	3rd	5	2	1	2	11	15	Squad	2	2	0	0	6	2	Link
(Switzerland) 1954	Did not qualify									4	1	1	2	9	8	Link
(Sweden) 1958	Runners-up	2nd	6	4	1	1	12	7	Squad	Qualified as hosts						Link
(Chile) 1962	Did not qualify									5	3	0	2	11	5	Link
(England) 1966	Did not qualify									4	2	1	1	10	3	Link
(Mexico) 1970	Group stage	9th	3	1	1	1	2	2	Squad	4	3	0	1	12	5	Link
(West Germany) 1974	Quarter-finals (Note: Last 8 held as second group stage.)	5th	6	2	2	2	7	6	Squad	7	4	2	1	17	9	Link
(Argentina) 1978	Group stage	13th	3	0	1	2	1	3	Squad	4	3	0	1	7	4	Link
(Spain) 1982	Did not qualify									8	3	2	3	7	8	Link
(Mexico) 1986	Did not qualify									8	4	1	3	14	9	Link
(Italy) 1990	Group stage	21st	3	0	0	3	3	6	Squad	6	4	2	0	9	3	Link
(United States) 1994	Third place	3rd	7	3	3	1	15	8	Squad	10	6	3	1	19	8	Link
(France) 1998	Did not qualify									10	7	0	3	16	9	Link
(South Korea) (Japan) 2002	Round of 16	13th	4	1	2	1	5	5	Squad	10	8	2	0	20	3	Link
(Germany) 2006	Round of 16	14th	4	1	2	1	3	4	Squad	10	8	0	2	30	4	Link
(South Africa) 2010	Did not qualify									10	5	3	2	13	5	Link
(Brazil) 2014	Did not qualify									12	6	2	4	21	18	Link
(Russia) 2018	Quarter-finals	7th	5	3	0	2	6	4	Squad	12	7	2	3	27	9	Link
(Qatar) 2022	Did not qualify									10	6	0	4	13	8	Link
(Canada) (Mexico) (United States) 2026	Round of 32	27th	4	1	1	2	7	10	Squad	8	2	2	4	10	15	Link
(Morocco) (Portugal) (Spain) 2030	To be determined									To be determined						Link
(Saudi Arabia) 2034	To be determined									To be determined						Link
Total	Runners-up	13/23	55	20	14	21	87	83	—	149	88	23	38	290	144	Link

=== UEFA European Championship ===
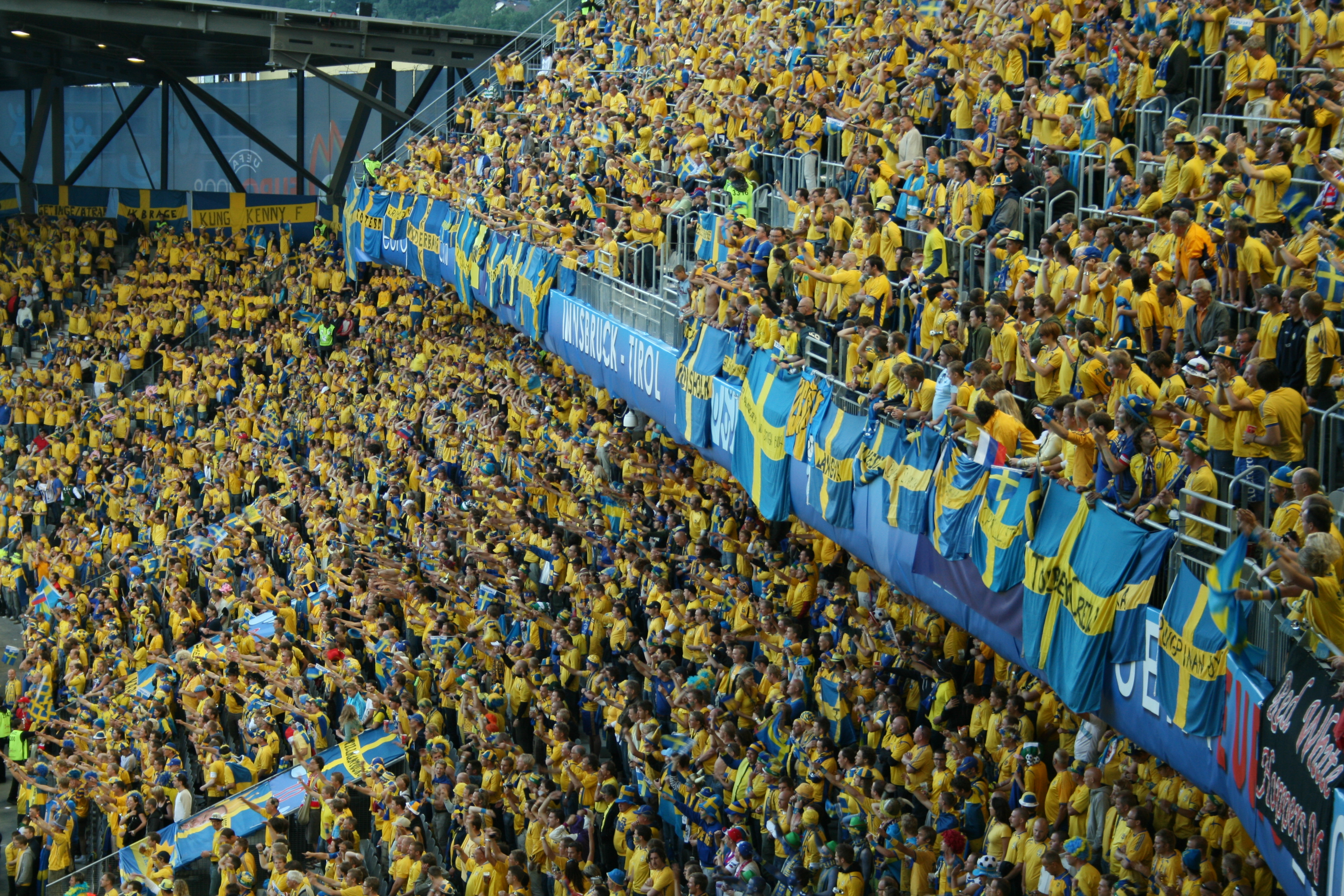
Sweden national team supporters during UEFA Euro 2008

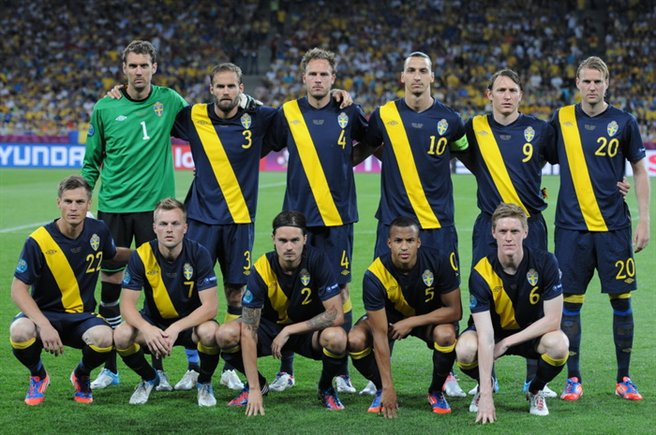
Sweden at the UEFA Euro 2012

UEFA European Championship record									Qualification record						
Year	Round	Position	Pld	W	D	L	GF	GA	Pld	W	D	L	GF	GA	Link
(France) 1960	Did not enter								Did not enter						Link
(Spain) 1964	Did not qualify								6	2	3	1	8	7	Link
(Italy) 1968	Did not qualify								6	2	1	3	9	12	Link
(Belgium) 1972	Did not qualify								6	2	2	2	3	5	Link
(Socialist Federal Republic of Yugoslavia) 1976	Did not qualify								6	3	0	3	8	9	Link
(Italy) 1980	Did not qualify								6	1	2	3	9	13	Link
(France) 1984	Did not qualify								8	5	1	2	14	5	Link
(West Germany) 1988	Did not qualify								8	4	2	2	12	5	Link
(Sweden) 1992	Semi-finals	3rd	4	2	1	1	6	5	Qualified as hosts						Link
(England) 1996	Did not qualify								8	2	3	3	9	10	Link
(Belgium) (Netherlands) 2000	Group stage	14th	3	0	1	2	2	4	8	7	1	0	10	1	Link
(Portugal) 2004	Quarter-finals	7th	4	1	3	0	8	3	8	5	2	1	19	3	Link
(Austria) (Switzerland) 2008	Group stage	10th	3	1	0	2	3	4	12	8	2	2	23	9	Link
(Poland) (Ukraine) 2012	Group stage	11th	3	1	0	2	5	5	10	8	0	2	31	11	Link
(France) 2016	Group stage	20th	3	0	1	2	1	3	12	6	4	2	19	12	Link
(Europe) 2020	Round of 16	10th	4	2	1	1	5	4	10	6	3	1	23	9	Link
(Germany) 2024	Did not qualify								8	3	1	4	14	12	Link
(England) (Scotland) (Republic of Ireland) (Wales) 2028	To be determined								To be determined						Link
(Italy) (Turkey) 2032	To be determined								To be determined						Link
Total	Semi-finals	7/17	24	7	7	10	30	28	122	64	27	31	211	123	Link

=== UEFA Nations League ===
UEFA Nations League record
Season	Division	Group	Pld	W	D	L	GF	GA	P/R	RK
2018–19	B	2	4	2	1	1	5	3	▲	16th
2020–21	A	3	6	1	0	5	5	13	▼	14th
2022–23	B	4	6	1	1	4	7	11	▼	30th
2024–25	C	1	6	5	1	0	19	4	▲	34th
2026–27	B	4	6	4	2	0	11	6	▲	18th
2028–29	A	To be determined								
Total			28	13	5	10	47	37	14th	

=== Olympic Games ===
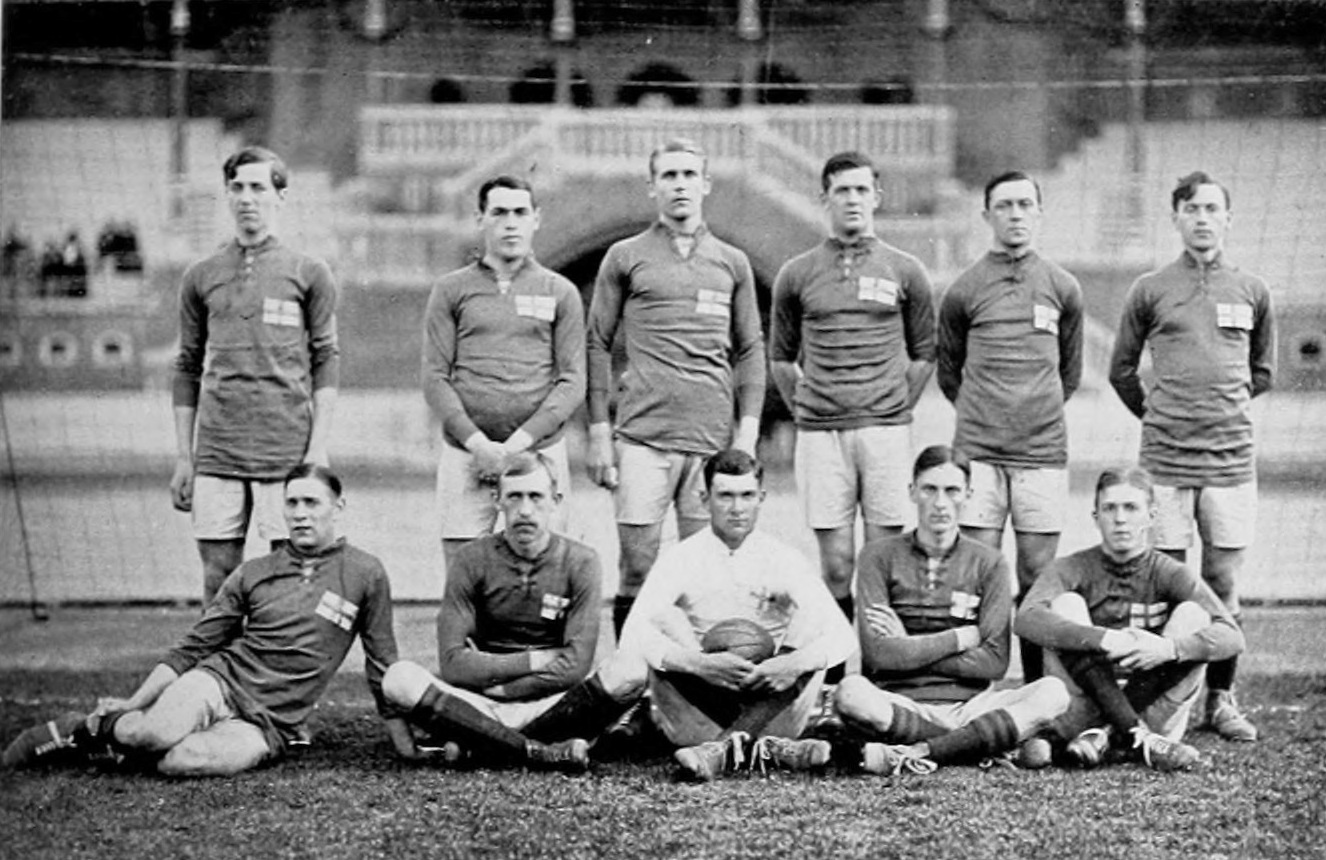
Sweden at the 1912 Summer Olympics

Football at the Summer Olympics was first played officially in 1908. The Olympiads between 1896 and 1980 were only open for amateur players. The 1984 and 1988 tournaments were open to players with no appearances in the FIFA World Cup. Since 1992 Olympics, the football event was changed into a tournament for under-23 teams with a maximum of three overage players. See Sweden Olympic football team for competition record from 1984 until present day.

Olympic Games record									Qualification record					
Year	Round	Position	Pld	W	D	L	GF	GA	Pld	W	D	L	GF	GA
(United Kingdom) 1908	Fourth place	4th	2	0	0	2	1	14	No qualification					
(Sweden) 1912	Round of 16	9th	2	0	0	2	3	5	No qualification					
(Belgium) 1920	Quarter-finals	5th	3	1	0	2	14	7	No qualification					
(French Third Republic) 1924	Bronze medal	3rd	5	3	1	1	18	5	No qualification					
(Netherlands) 1928	Did not enter								No qualification					
(Nazi Germany) 1936	Round of 16	9th	1	0	0	1	2	3	No qualification					
(United Kingdom) 1948	Gold medal	1st	4	4	0	0	22	3	No qualification					
(Finland) 1952	Bronze medal	3rd	4	3	0	1	9	8	No qualification					
(Australia) 1956	Did not enter								Did not enter					
(Italy) 1960	Did not enter								Did not enter					
(Japan) 1964	Did not qualify								2	0	1	1	2	6
(Mexico) 1968	Did not enter								Did not enter					
(West Germany) 1972	Did not enter								Did not enter					
(Canada) 1976	Did not enter								Did not enter					
(Soviet Union) 1980	Did not enter								Did not enter					
1984–present	See Sweden Olympic football team													
Total	1 title	7/15	21	11	1	9	69	45	2	0	1	1	2	6

=== Nordic Football Championship ===
Nordic Football Championship record
Year	Round	Position	Pld	W	D	L	GF	GA
1924–28	Runners-up	2nd	10	6	1	3	31	19
1929–32	Runners-up	2nd	12	6	1	5	35	31
1933–36	Champions	1st	12	7	2	3	31	22
1937–47	Champions	1st	12	9	0	3	41	16
1948–51	Champions	1st	12	7	2	3	36	22
1952–55	Champions	1st	12	8	4	0	44	14
1956–59	Champions	1st	12	9	2	1	45	17
1960–63	Champions	1st	12	7	3	2	24	10
1964–67	Champions	1st	12	5	4	3	22	14
1968–71	Champions	1st	12	10	2	0	32	10
1972–77	Champions	1st	12	8	2	2	24	9
1978–80	Runners-up	2nd	6	3	0	3	7	6
1981–85	Runners-up	2nd	6	3	1	2	7	4
2000–01	Fifth place	5th	5	1	2	2	3	4
Total	9 titles	14/14	147	89	26	32	382	198

=== Minor tournaments ===
Minor tournaments record
Tournament	Round	Position	Pld	W	D	L	GF	GA
(Denmark) 1939 DBU 50 years	Semi-finals	3rd	1	0	0	1	0	1
(Finland) (Sweden) 1947 FBF 40 years	Winners	1st	2	2	0	0	11	2
(Norway) 1952 NFF 50 years	Runners-up	2nd	2	1	0	1	3	3
(Sweden) 1954 SvFF 50 years	Winners	1st	2	2	0	0	9	0
(Finland) 1957 FBF 50 years	Winners	1st	2	1	1	0	5	1
(Finland) 1981 Lahti Cup	Runners-up	2nd	2	1	0	1	5	4
(Spain) 1988 Maspalomas	Winners	1st	2	2	0	0	5	1
(West Germany) 1988 West Berlin	Winners	1st	2	1	1	0	3	1
(Denmark) 1989 DBU 100 years	Runners-up	2nd	2	1	0	1	2	7
(Sweden) 1991 Scania 100	Third place	3rd	2	1	0	1	6	3
(United States) 1994 Joe Robbie Cup	Winners	1st	2	1	1	0	3	1
(Denmark) (Norway) (Sweden) 1994 Nordic Cup	Winners	1st	2	1	0	1	2	1
(England) 1995 Umbro Cup	Third place	3rd	3	0	2	1	5	6
(Hong Kong) 1996 Carlsberg Cup	Winners	1st	2	1	1	0	2	1
(Thailand) 1997 King's Cup	Winners	1st	4	3	1	0	6	1
(Thailand) 2001 King's Cup	Winners	1st	4	2	2	0	9	3
(Thailand) 2003 King's Cup	Winners	1st	4	3	1	0	12	4
(Hong Kong) 2004 Carlsberg Cup	Third place	3rd	2	1	0	1	3	3
2011 Cyprus Cup	Runners-up	2nd	2	1	1	0	3	1
(Thailand) 2013 King's Cup	Winners	1st	2	1	1	0	4	1
Total	12 titles	20/20	46	26	12	8	98	45

== Head-to-head record ==
The following table shows Sweden's all-time international record. The abandoned match against Denmark on 2 June 2007 here counts as a draw. Former national teams are included in their respective successor team. The expection is Czechoslovakia, since both the Czech Republic and Slovakia count as successor teams in this case.

Statistics updated as of 17 November 2026.

Against	Pld	W	D	L	GF	GA	GD	Win %
Albania	6	4	1	1	11	5	+6	66.67%
Algeria	6	5	1	0	15	4	+11	83.33%
Argentina	3	1	1	1	6	6	0	33.33%
Armenia	1	1	0	0	3	1	+2	100%
Australia	5	1	2	2	2	2	0	20%
Austria	39	13	6	20	56	62	−6	33.33%
Azerbaijan	6	5	0	1	18	4	+14	83.33%
Bahrain	1	1	0	0	2	0	+2	100%
Barbados	1	1	0	0	4	0	+4	100%
Belarus	5	5	0	0	16	2	+14	100%
Belgium	17	5	3	9	31	27	+4	29.41%
Bosnia and Herzegovina	3	2	1	0	8	5	+3	66.67%
Botswana	1	1	0	0	2	1	+1	100%
Brazil	15	2	3	10	17	35	−18	13.33%
Bulgaria	16	11	2	3	31	11	+20	68.75%
Cameroon	1	0	1	0	2	2	0	0%
Chile	2	0	1	1	2	3	−1	0%
China	3	2	1	0	6	2	+4	66.67%
Colombia	2	0	2	0	2	2	0	0%
Costa Rica	2	1	0	1	2	2	0	50%
Croatia	6	2	0	4	7	8	−1	33.33%
Cuba	1	1	0	0	8	0	+8	100%
Cyprus	6	5	1	0	19	3	+16	83.33%
Czech Republic	4	2	2	0	7	5	+2	50%
Czechoslovakia	16	3	4	9	21	36	−15	18.75%
Denmark	110	47	21	42	189	179	+10	42.73%
East Germany	6	2	1	3	8	9	−1	33.33%
Ecuador	2	0	1	1	2	3	−1	0%
Egypt	4	2	0	2	10	3	+7	50%
England	28	7	9	12	34	67	−33	25%
Estonia	23	20	3	0	70	18	+52	86.96%
Faroe Islands	5	4	1	0	11	1	+10	80%
Finland	91	69	11	11	299	96	+203	75.82%
France	24	6	5	13	23	37	−14	25%
Georgia	2	1	0	1	1	2	−1	50%
Germany	38	13	9	16	63	72	−9	36%
Greece	10	3	4	3	22	12	+10	30%
Hungary	47	18	11	18	81	91	−10	38.3%
Iceland	17	12	3	2	39	18	+21	70.59%
Iran	1	1	0	0	3	1	+2	100%
Israel	12	7	4	1	26	9	+17	58.33%
Italy	25	7	7	11	25	28	−3	28%
Ivory Coast	3	1	0	2	3	3	0	33.33%
Jamaica	2	1	1	0	2	1	+1	50%
Japan	6	1	4	1	8	8	0	16.67%
Jordan	1	0	1	0	0	0	0	0%
Kazakhstan	2	2	0	0	3	0	+3	100%
Kosovo	5	3	0	2	7	3	+4	60%
Latvia	17	11	4	2	54	12	+42	64.71%
Liechtenstein	4	4	0	0	10	1	+9	100%
Lithuania	5	5	0	0	22	3	+19	100%
Luxembourg	7	5	1	1	16	2	+14	71.43%
Malaysia	1	1	0	0	3	1	+2	100%
Malta	13	13	0	0	49	2	+47	100%
Mexico	11	6	3	2	13	6	+7	54.55%
Moldova	9	9	0	0	24	4	+20	100%
Montenegro	3	2	1	0	6	3	+3	66.67%
Netherlands	26	8	6	12	49	52	−3	30.77%
New Zealand	1	1	0	0	4	1	+3	100%
Nigeria	2	2	0	0	5	2	+3	100%
North Korea	3	1	2	0	6	2	+4	33.33%
North Macedonia	3	3	0	0	4	1	+3	100%
Northern Ireland	8	4	1	3	12	11	+1	50%
Norway	112	60	25	27	285	158	+127	53.57%
Oman	1	1	0	0	1	0	+1	100%
Paraguay	3	1	1	1	4	4	0	33.33%
Peru	1	0	1	0	0	0	0	0%
Poland	31	17	5	9	66	45	+21	54.84%
Portugal	21	7	6	8	31	30	+1	33.33%
Qatar	3	2	1	0	8	2	+6	66.67%
Republic of Ireland	11	5	3	3	17	14	+3	45.45%
Romania	14	8	3	3	27	13	+14	57.14%
Russia	29	10	10	9	37	47	−10	34.48%
San Marino	4	4	0	0	22	0	+22	100%
Saudi Arabia	3	2	1	0	6	3	+3	66.67%
Scotland	12	6	1	5	19	14	+5	50%
Senegal	1	0	0	1	1	2	−1	0%
Serbia	16	5	2	9	20	30	−10	31.25%
Singapore	1	1	0	0	5	0	+5	100%
Slovakia	9	5	4	0	16	5	+11	55.56%
Slovenia	6	2	4	0	7	4	+3	33.33%
South Africa	3	1	1	1	4	2	+2	33.33%
South Korea	5	3	2	0	18	3	+15	60%
Spain	18	4	6	8	18	27	−9	22.22%
Switzerland	31	11	7	13	48	48	0	35.48%
Syria	1	0	1	0	1	1	0	0%
Thailand	5	4	1	0	13	4	+9	80%
Trinidad and Tobago	2	1	1	0	5	0	+5	50%
Tunisia	5	3	1	1	8	3	+5	60%
Turkey	12	3	4	5	14	15	−1	25%
Ukraine	6	2	1	3	7	7	0	33.33%
United Arab Emirates	2	1	0	1	3	2	+1	50%
United States	8	4	0	4	13	10	+3	50%
Uruguay	3	2	0	1	6	3	+3	66.67%
Uzbekistan	1	1	0	0	2	1	+1	100%
Venezuela	1	0	0	1	0	2	−2	0%
Wales	7	6	1	0	16	3	+13	85.71%
Total	1133	558	239	336	2252	1494	+758	49.25%

== Honours ==
=== Global ===
- FIFA World Cup
  - (silver) Runners-up (1): 1958
  - (bronze) Third place (2): 1950, 1994
- Olympic Games
  - (gold) Gold medal (1): 1948
  - (bronze) Bronze medal (2): 1924, 1952

=== Regional ===
- Nordic Football Championship
  - (gold) Champions (9): 1933–36, 1937–47, 1948–51, 1952–55, 1956–59, 1960–63, 1964–67, 1968–71, 1972–77
  - (silver) Runners-up (4): 1924–28, 1929–32, 1978–80, 1981–85

=== Summary ===
Competition	1st place, gold medalist(s)	2nd place, silver medalist(s)	3rd place, bronze medalist(s)	Total
FIFA World Cup	0	1	2	3
Olympic Games	1	0	2	3
Total	1	1	4	6

== See also ==
- Denmark–Sweden football rivalry
- Football in Sweden
- Gotland official football team
- Sápmi football team
- Sweden national football B team (defunct)
- Sweden national under-21 football team
- Sweden men's national under-19 football team
- Sweden men's national under-17 football team
- Sweden Olympic football team
- Sweden women's national football team

== Notes ==
Preceded by Torgny Mogren	Svenska Dagbladet Gold Medal; 1994	Succeeded by Annika Sörenstam
