= Gustaf Fröding =

Swedish poet and writer (1860–1911)

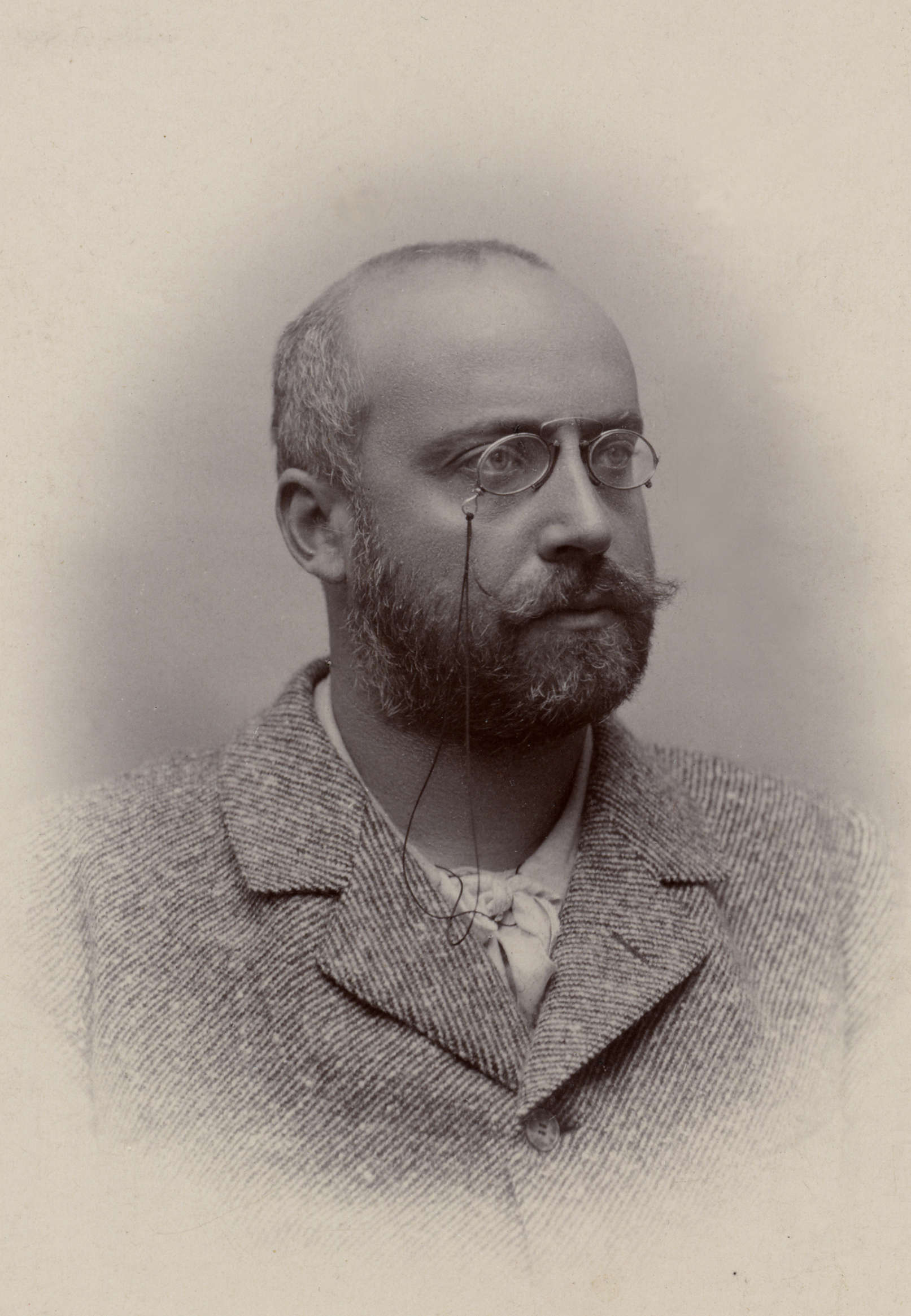
- Fröding in 1896
- Born: 22 August 1860; Alster, Sweden
- Died: 8 February 1911 (aged 50); Stockholm, Sweden
- Writing career
- Language: Swedish

Gustaf Fröding (Swedish: [ˈɡɵ̂sːtav ˈfrø̂ːdɪŋ]; 22 August 1860 – 8 February 1911) was a Swedish poet and writer from Alster, Värmland. The family moved to Kristinehamn in the year 1867. He later studied at Uppsala University and worked as a journalist in Karlstad.

== Poetry ==
His poetry combines formal virtuosity with a sympathy for the ordinary, the neglected and the down-trodden, sometimes written in his own regional dialect. It is highly musical and lends itself to musical setting; many of his poems have been set to music and recorded by Swedish singers such as Olle Adolphson, Monica Zetterlund, the Värmland group Sven-Ingvars and the Swedish band Mando Diao.

Fröding wrote openly about his personal problems with alcohol and women and had to face a trial for obscenity.

Jag köpte min kärlek för pengar,
för mig var ej annan att få,
sjung vackert, I skorrande strängar,
sjung vackert om kärlek ändå.

Den drömmen, som aldrig besannats,
som dröm var den vacker att få,
för den, som ur Eden förbannats,
är Eden ett Eden ändå.

— from Gralstänk
Translation:

I purchased my love (how dearly!)
For money — what else could I get?
O jangling strings, sound clearly
The theme of my love-song yet!

For the dream, though the truth were vanished,
Was the princeliest dream I could get,
And for him who from Eden is banished
Is Eden an Eden yet.

— Translation by C. D. Locock

== Sickness ==
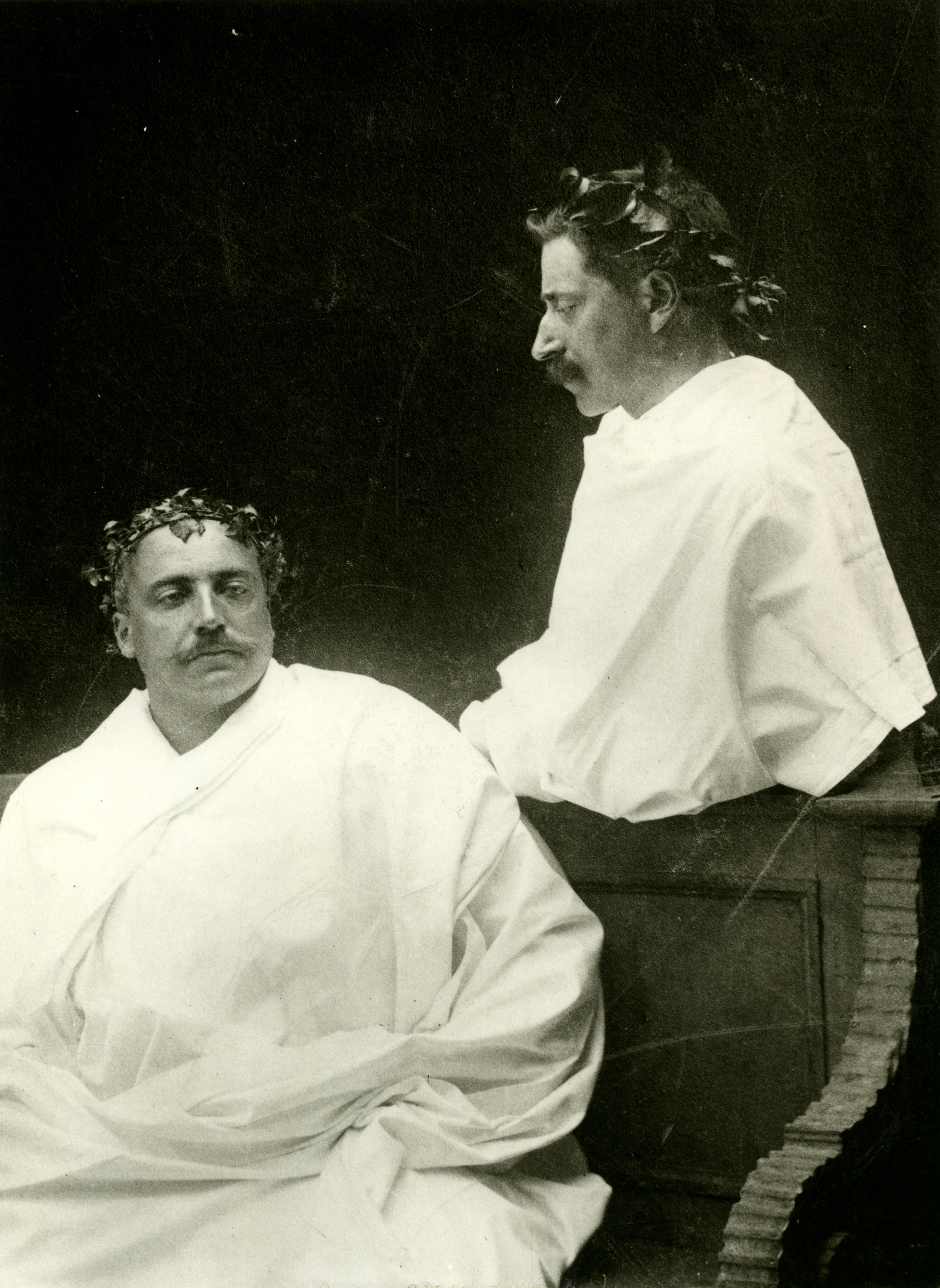
Gustaf Fröding and Verner von Heidenstam dressed in togas, the day after Heidenstam's marriage at Blå Jungfrun

The latter part of his life he spent in different mental institutions and hospitals to cure his mental illness and alcoholism, and eventually diabetes. During the first half of the 1890s he spent a couple of years at the Suttestad institution in Lillehammer, Norway, where he finished his work on his third book of poetry Stänk och flikar, which was published in 1896. He wrote much of the material at a mental institution in Görlitz, Germany. In 1896 he moved back to Sweden. But as the year neared Christmas, his sister Cecilia made the difficult decision to make him stay at a hospital in Uppsala. Under the care of professor Frey Svenson Fröding got away from liquor and women, except one, Ida Bäckman. Fröding never married Ida, but grew fond of a nurse named Signe Trotzig. When he left hospital in Uppsala she stayed with him to the day he died.

A play by Swedish playwright Gottfrid Grafström, called Sjung vackert om kärlek, about Fröding's time at the mental institution in Uppsala was first performed at the Royal Dramatic Theatre in 1973 and has had periodic revivals since.

== Selected works ==
- Gitarr och dragharmonika (Guitar and concertina) 1891
- Nya dikter (New poems) 1893
- Räggler å paschaser (Tall tales and adventures) 1895
- Stänk och flikar (Splashes and spray) 1896
- Nytt och gammalt (New and old) 1897
- Gralstänk (Splashes of the grail) 1898
- Efterskörd (Gleanings) 1910
- Reconvalescentia (Convalescence) 1914
- Samlade skrifter 1–16 (Collected works 1–16) 1917–1922
- Brev till en ung flicka (Letters to a young girl) 1952
- Äventyr i Norge (Adventures in Norway) 1963
- Gustaf Frödings brev, 2 vol. (Gustaf Fröding's letters, 2 vol.) 1981–1982
- "23 Bojaere"*

English translations

- Poems 1903
- Selected Poems 1916
- Guitar and Concertina 1925
- Gustaf Fröding: His Life and Poetry 1986
- Swedes On Love CD 1991
- The Selected Poems of Gustaf Fröding 1993
- The Complete Poems of Gustaf Fröding 1997–1999
- The North! To the North! 2001
