= SS Alster =

A number of steamships have been named Alster, including -

- SS Alster (1886), 806 GRT, built by S P Austin & Son, Sunderland.
- SS Alster (1896), 573 GRT, built by Joh. C. Tecklenborg, Wesermünde
- SS Alster (1914), 997 GRT, built by Reihersteig Schiffswerke, Hamburg
- SS Alster (1928), 8,514 GRT, built by Deutsche Werft, Hamburg
- SS Alster (1854), 299 GRT, built by Denny & Rankine, Dumbarton, Scotland
