= Frey Svenson =

Swedish psychologist (1866–1927)

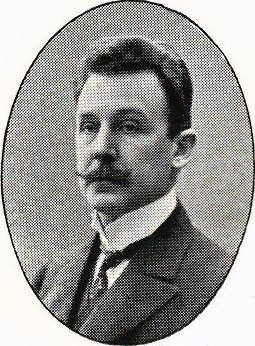
Frey Svenson

Frey Svenson (1866–1927) was a Swedish medical doctor and professor of psychology, born in Vetlanda, Sweden.

In the year of 1899 he took up the position of an acting assistant physician at Uppsala Hospital, which at that time was a psychiatric hospital rather than a medical hospital. Here he met the Swedish poet Gustaf Fröding. Svenson tried to help Fröding deal with his mental illness and also became his friend. This was the basis of a book called Gustaf Frödings diktning. Bidrag till dess psykologi (The poems by Gustaf Fröding. What lies beneath), published in 1916.

Svenson became a professor at Uppsala University in 1904, the same school where he got his doctoral diploma.
