= Lars Arnesson =

Swedish footballer and manager (1936–2023)

Personal information
- Date of birth: 20 February 1936
- Place of birth: Sandviken, Sweden
- Date of death: 1 October 2023 (aged 87)
- Position: Defender

Senior career*
Years	Team	Apps	(Gls)
- Sandvikens IF
1960–1964	Djurgårdens IF	93	(1)

Managerial career
- 1969: Skövde AIK
- 1970–1972: Kalmar FF
- 1975–1976: Sweden U-21
- 1977–1980: Östers IF
- 1979: Djurgårdens IF
- 1979: Sweden U-21
- 1980–1985: Sweden
- * Club domestic league appearances and goals

Lars "Laban" Arnesson (20 February 1936 – 1 October 2023) was a Swedish professional football player and manager and bandy player. He was the coach of the Sweden men's national football team from 1980 to 1986.

== Career ==
Arnesson represented Djurgården 1960–64, playing 93 matches and scoring one goal as well as winning one Swedish title, in 1964.

Arnesson had great success as a coach for Östers IF and got the job as coach for the national team, leading Sweden in 1982 and 1986 World Cup qualifying. Having never taken the team to any World Cup, he resigned in 1986. He also played for Djurgårdens IF in the early 1960s.

Following his coaching career, Arnesson worked with the FIFA technical committee to evaluate proposals for changes to the FIFA Laws of the Game.

Arnesson also played bandy for Djurgårdens IF between 1961 and 1965.

== Death ==
Lars Arnesson died on 1 October 2023, at the age of 87.

== Honours ==
Djurgårdens IF

- Allsvenskan: 1964
