= Alster, Sweden =

Alster
- Location within Sweden
- Coordinates: 59°24′N 13°37′E
- Country: Sweden
- Province: Värmland
- County: Värmland County
- Municipality: Karlstad Municipality

Area
  - Total: 0.84 km^{2} (0.32 sq mi)

Population (31 December 2010)
  - Total: 586
  - Density: 699/km^{2} (1,810/sq mi)
- Time zone: UTC+1 (CET)
  - Summer (DST): UTC+2 (CEST)

Alster is a locality situated in Karlstad Municipality, Värmland County, Sweden with 586 inhabitants in 2010. Alster is the birthplace of poet Gustaf Fröding.
