= Carl Gustaf von Rosen =

Swedish aviator and humanitarian (1909–1977)

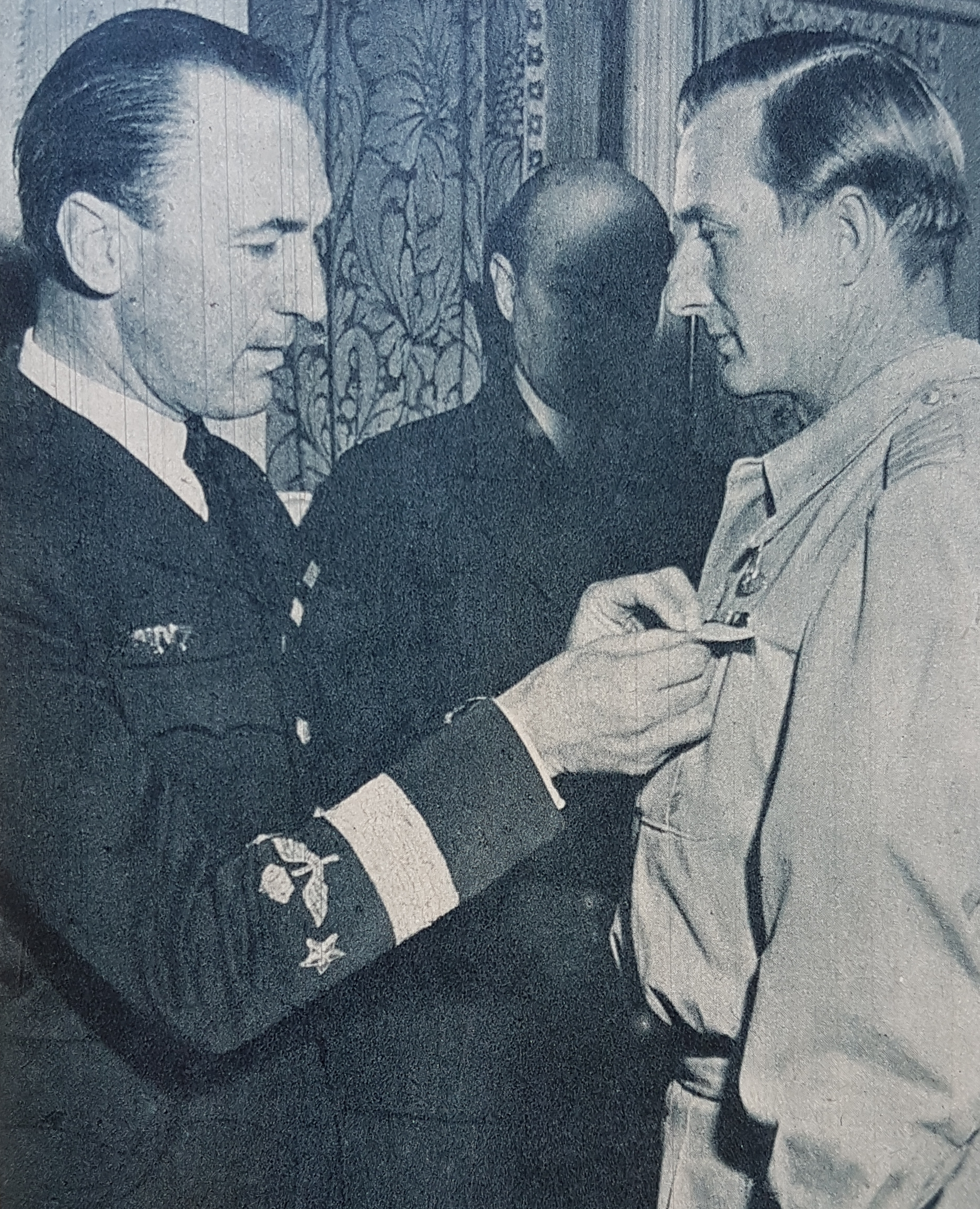
- Carl Gustaf von Rosen (right) receiving a decoration from Bengt Nordenskiöld.
- Born: Carl Gustaf Ericsson von Rosen; August 19, 1909; Helgesta, Sweden
- Died: 13 July 1977 (aged 67); Gode, Ethiopia
- Occupations: Pioneer aviator, humanitarian, mercenary pilot
- Spouse(s): Stina Maria Theresia (Mille) Wijkmark (1932–1936); Johanna (Hanny) Franciena Krijgsman (1938–1943); Gunvor Lilian Martin (1943–1977)
- Children: 6
- Parent(s): Eric von Rosen; Mary Fock
- Military career
- Allegiance: Finland; Ethiopian Empire; Biafra
- Branch: Finnish Air Force (Ethiopian Empire) Ethiopian Air Force (United Nations) ONUC; Biafran Air Force
- Service years: 1942–1945
- Conflicts: Second Italo-Ethiopian War; World War II; Winter War (WIA); Congo Crisis; Nigerian Civil War; Somali invasion of Ogaden †

Count Carl Gustaf Ericsson von Rosen (19 August 1909 – 13 July 1977) was a Swedish pioneer aviator, humanitarian, and mercenary pilot. He flew relief missions in a number of conflicts as well as combat missions for Finland (whose first military aircraft his father had donated in 1918) and Biafra. His flights for the Biafran Air Force were notable for using the small Malmö MFI-9 in a ground attack role.

== Early life and family ==
Von Rosen was born in Helgesta, Flen Municipality, Södermanland, Sweden and grew up in Rockelstad Castle. He was the son of the explorer Count Eric von Rosen (1879–1948), co-founder of the National Socialist Bloc, and baroness Mary Fock (1886–1967). He was nephew of Carin Göring, wife of Hermann Göring. Throughout his upbringing, Carl Gustaf appeared to have had serious differences in opinion with his family, with one author referring to him as the "black sheep of his family." His brother, Björn (1905–1989), was a writer, graphic artist and painter, and his sister, Birgitta Wolf (1913–2009), was a writer and human rights activist. From an early age, Carl Gustaf was interested in mechanics; his subsequent fascination with flying machines was likely influenced by his uncle, who was a fighter ace during World War I (and later head of the German Luftwaffe).

He was a student at Lundsbergs boarding school from 1920 to 1926 and at AB Aeromateriel's flight school in 1929 and took the pilot's license test the same year. Von Rosen took the airline pilot exam in 1934. Von Rosen himself started his flying career as a mechanic before becoming an aerobatic stunt pilot in a travelling circus.

== Second Italo-Ethiopian War ==
When the Kingdom of Italy invaded the independent state of Ethiopia in 1935, von Rosen joined the Swedish Red Cross ambulance mission. He also repeatedly flew casualties out from the battlefield under extremely dangerous conditions. This activity resulted in him receiving mustard gas burns due to the use of the gas by the Italian Air Force.

After his return from the war in Ethiopia, he went to the Netherlands to join the KLM, the first public airline in the world, and became one of their foremost pilots.

== Second World War ==
Von Rosen's happiness with his second wife, Hanny, ended with the outbreak of World War II. She joined the resistance, was arrested by the Gestapo and sent to Dachau in Germany. After the war, she committed suicide in 1949.

When the Soviet Union attacked Finland in 1939 in the Winter War, von Rosen quit his job to fly bombing missions for the Finns. He purchased a KLM Douglas DC-2, had it converted to a bomber in Sweden, and made one operational mission in March 1940 against the Soviet Union with it. Later the same year, as the Germans attacked the Netherlands, von Rosen with a Dutch KLM-crew flew a DC-3 with Dutch government documents to England and applied for service with the RAF but was turned down, on account of his family relation to Hermann Göring. Von Rosen went on flying for the Swedish airline AB Aerotransport (ABA) from August 1940 until the end of the war.

== Post-war ==
Between 1945 and 1956 von Rosen worked in Ethiopia as the chief instructor for the Imperial Ethiopian Air Force. Afterwards von Rosen was employed by the Swedish charter airline Transair. The company was engaged by the UN during the Congo Crisis 1960. Von Rosen also served as the pilot for the second Secretary-General of the United Nations, Dag Hammarskjöld. However, von Rosen was grounded by illness when Hammarskjöld was killed in an air crash while mediating in the Congo Crisis.

== Biafran War ==
Von Rosen's involvement in Africa did not end with the Congo Crisis. He gained international fame seven years later when he flew relief missions for aid organisations into war-torn Biafra, a breakaway republic of Nigeria. These flights included flying a DC-7 from São Tomé to Uli at only a little above sea level in August 1968.

Disgusted at the suffering the Nigerian government inflicted on the Biafrans and the continuous harassment of international relief flights by the Nigerian Air Force, he hatched a plan in collaboration with the French secret service to strike back at Nigerian air power. He imported five small civilian single engine MFI-9 planes produced by Malmö Flygindustri, at that time owned by SAAB, which he knew could also be used for a ground attack role in warfare. He had the planes painted in camouflage colours and fitted with license manufactured 68 mm SNEB type rockets, and proceeded with a crew of two Swedes and two Biafrans to form a squadron called 'Biafra Babies' to strike the air fields from which the federal Nigerian Air Force launched their attacks against the civilian population in Biafra. On 22 May 1969, and over the next few days, von Rosen and his five aircraft launched attacks against Nigerian air fields at Port Harcourt, Enugu, Benin and other small airports. The Nigerians were taken by surprise and a number of expensive jets, including a few MiG-17 fighters and three out of Nigeria's six Ilyushin Il-28 bombers, were destroyed on the ground. The Igbo intellectual Fola Oyewole who fought for Biafra recalled of all the Westerners who served with the Biafrans that Rosen was the most idealistic and the one who cared about the Igbos as a people the most.

Despite his controversial methods, von Rosen would later be remembered for his efforts to modernize relief efforts to remote conflict zones. One of the notable figures assisting Von Rosen was Lynn Garrison, an ex-RCAF fighter pilot. He introduced the von Rosen to a Canadian method of dropping bagged supplies to remote areas in Canada without losing the contents: a sack of food was placed inside a larger sack before the supply drop. When the package hit the ground, the inner sack would rupture, but the outer one kept the contents intact. With this method many tons of food were dropped to many Biafrans who would otherwise have died of starvation. Later models of the Malmö Flygindustri MFI-9 became the SAAB MFI-15 Safari, with official modifications, developed from the Biafran concept, to facilitate the dropping of food supplies from underwing hard points. Von Rosen was utilizing this type in Ogaden when he was killed during a rebel ground assault.

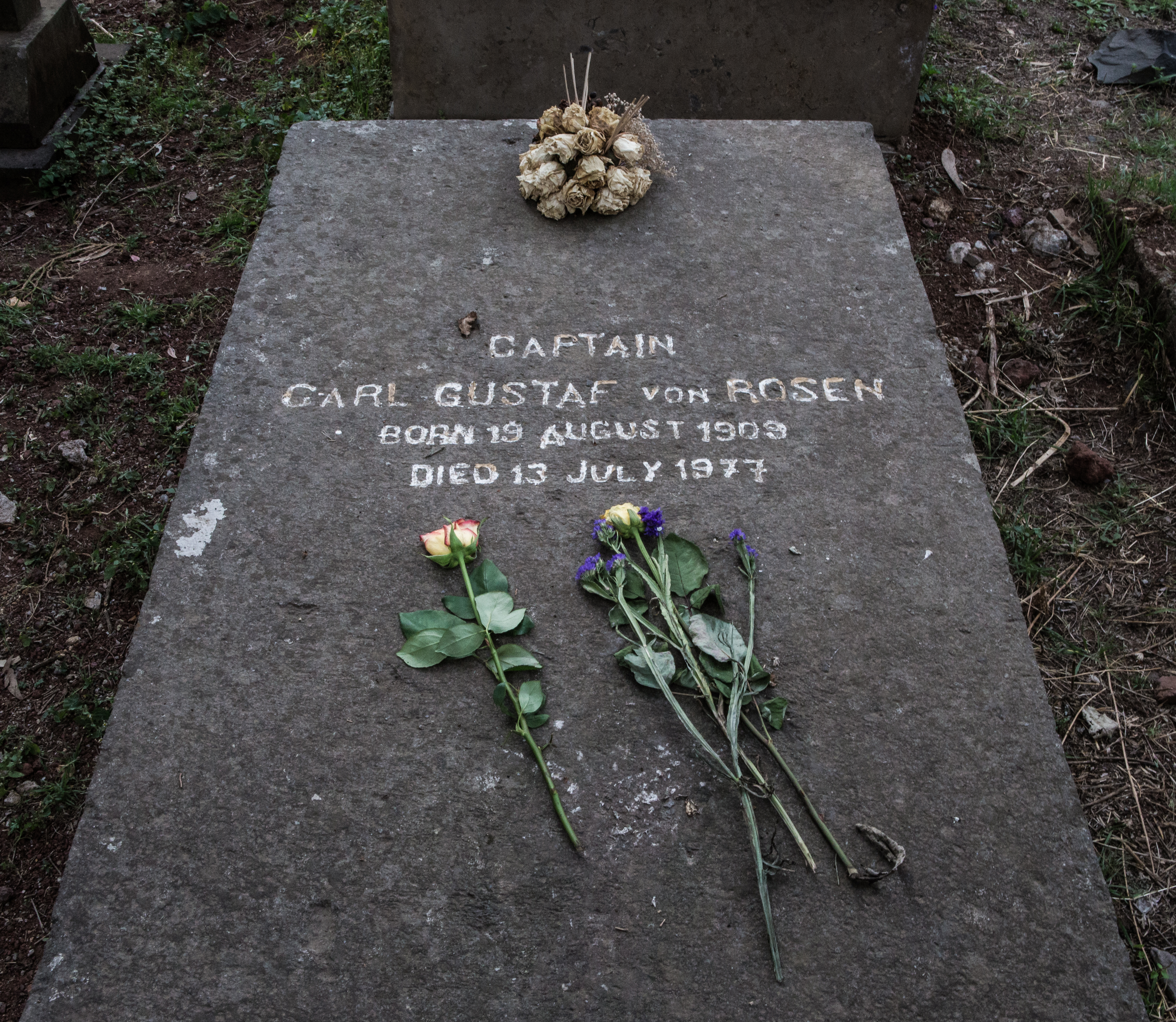
Grave to Carl Gustaf von Rosen in Addis Ababa, Ethiopia

== Return to Ethiopia ==
From 1974 to 1977 he flew aid for famine and drought victims in Ethiopia.

The last action von Rosen saw was again in Africa in 1977, during the Ogaden War between Ethiopia and Somalia. Again flying famine relief for refugees, he was killed on the ground on 13 July 1977, during a sudden Somali army attack in Gode at the outbreak of the war.

He was buried in Gulale cemetery, Addis Ababa.

== Personal life ==
Von Rosen was married 1932–1936 to Stina Maria Theresia (Mille) Wijkmark (1911–1994) and 1938–1943 to Johanna (Hanny) Franciena Krijgsman (1912–1949). In 1943 he married Gunvor Lilian Martin (1917–2009), daughter of the artist Seth Martin and baroness Lily Fock. Von Rosen was the father of Nils Gustaf (born 1932), Margaretha (born 1938), Yvonne (born 1940), Astrid (born 1945), Eric (born 1950) and Carl (born 1953).

== Awards ==
Von Rosen's awards:

- Knight of the Order of Vasa
- Commander of the Order of Menelik II
- 3rd Class of the Order of the Cross of Liberty with swords
- Finnish war memorial medal with swords and bar
- Finnish Medical silver medal
- Royal Swedish Aeroclub gold medal with wings and silver medal
- Gold medal
- Ethiopian Red Cross Gold Medal
- Ethiopian gold medal

== See also ==
- Carl Gustaf von Rosen biography
- Biafra
- Second Italo-Abyssinian War

== Books and articles ==
- Oyewole, Fola (1975). "Scientists and Mercenaries". Transition (48): 59–65. doi:10.2307/2935065. JSTOR 2935065.
