= Birgitta Wolf =

Swedish writer (1913–2009)

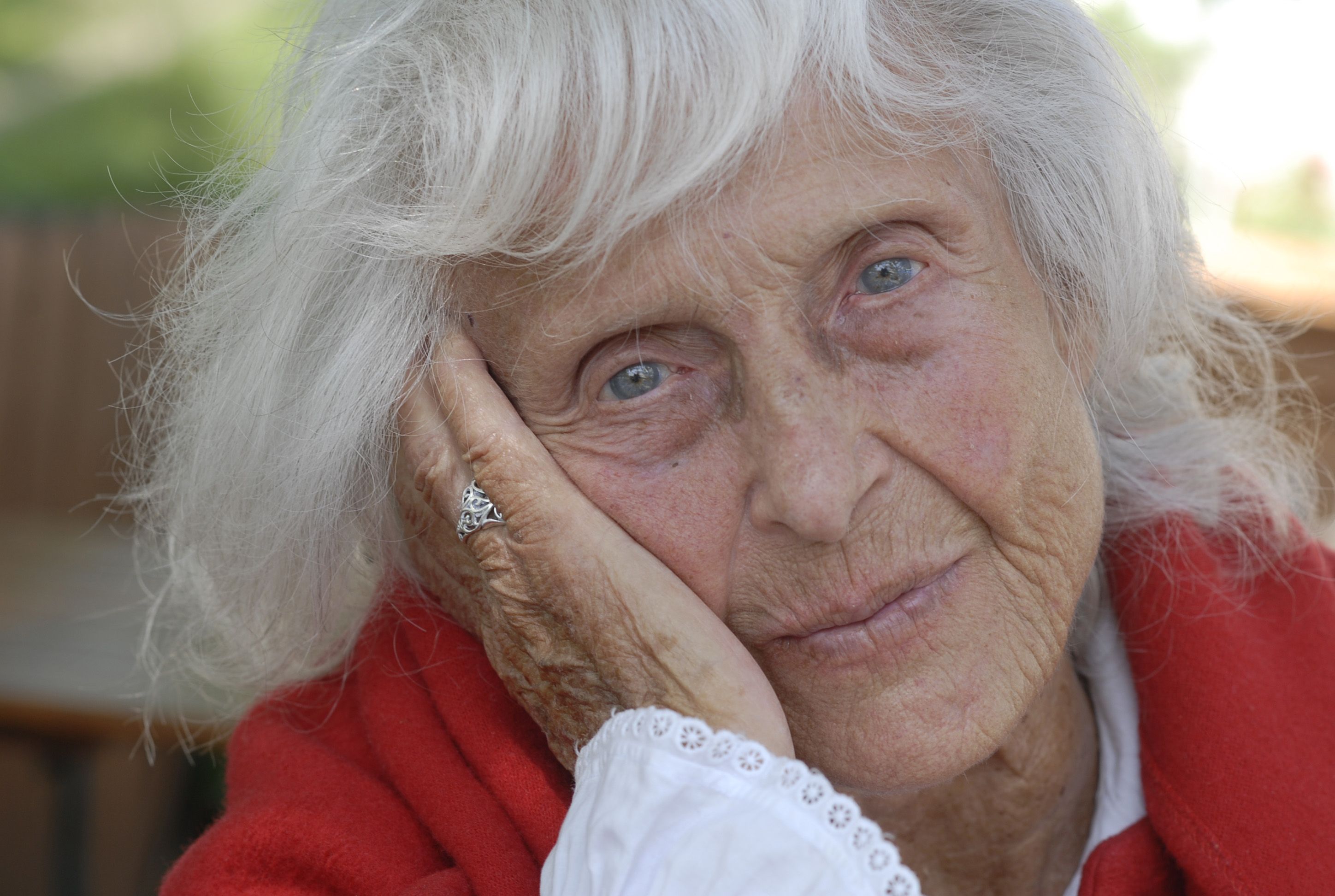
- Birgitta Wolf in 2007
- Born: 4 February 1913; Rockelstad Castle, Sweden
- Died: 25 April 2009 (aged 96); Murnau am Staffelsee, Germany
- Parents: Eric von Rosen (father); Mary von Rosen (mother)

Birgitta Wolf von Rosen (4 February 1913 – 25 April 2009) was a Swedish publicist who lived in Germany. She became known primarily for her work with prisoners and was known as the "Angel of the Prisoners".

== Early life ==
Wolf was the daughter of the Swedish landowner, explorer, and ethnologist Eric von Rosen. Her mother was Baroness Mary Fock and she was the sister of Carl Gustaf von Rosen and Björn von Rosen. She was born Countess Birgitta von Rosen at Rockelstad Castle in Sweden. She married in 1933 and moved to live with her German husband. As the niece of Carin Göring, the first wife of Hermann Göring. She had contacts with him and other prominent figures in the Nazi state. However, she soon began to advocate for prisoners and inmates of concentration camps.

== Prisoner support ==
From 1945 onward, the care of prisoners became her primary focus. Her correspondence with prisoners (approximately 60,000 letters) is now housed in the archive of the Hamburg Institute for Social Research. Her assistance consisted of offering encouragement and advice, but also of visiting prisoners and personally intervening with prison directors and supervisory authorities. She was sometimes referred to in the media as the "Angel of the Prisoners". Together with Erika Sprenger-Steinmüller, she founded the Birgitta Wolf Emergency Relief Association, which continues her work even after her death.

== Public protest ==
Wolf also championed the cause of prisoners through her writing. She gave lectures, wrote essays and books, and drew attention to the injustices she perceived in radio and television broadcasts. In 1970, she launched a campaign against aggravated solitary confinement (without a mattress, on bread and water, etc.), which at the time was still a standard disciplinary measure in the German penal system. This campaign led to the removal of aggravated solitary confinement from the penal code. Birgitta Wolf responded to the initial solitary confinement of RAF members in the autumn of 1974 with a 27-day hunger strike.

== Works (selection) ==
- Die vierte Kaste. Junge Menschen im Gefängnis. Literarische Dokumente. Herausgegeben von Birgitta Wolf. Hamburg 1963.
- Der Strafgefangene. Gefahren seiner Isolierung. In: Dietrich Rollmann (Hrsg.) Strafvollzug in Deutschland. Situation und Reform. Frankfurt 1967, S. 160–170.
- Aussagen. Briefe von Strafgefangenen. Mit einer Orientierung von Birgitta Wolf. München 1968.
- Anklage erhoben. Gedichte und Grafiken von Strafgefangenen, hrsg. von Birgitta Wolf, Gelhausen/Berlin 1972.
- Rede in Fuhlsbüttel. Zum Freitod von Heinz-Detlev Krieger und Hans Rohrmoser (1976), nachgedruckt in: Kurt Kreiler (Hrsg.) Innen-Welt. Verständigungstexte Gefangener. Frankfurt 1979, S. 28–30.
- Briefwechsel zwischen Peter Schönwiese und Birgitta Wolf. In: Kurt Kreiler (Hrsg.) Innen-Welt. Verständigungstexte Gefangener. Frankfurt 1979, S. 31–71.
- Ohne Stern: Weihnacht der Aussenseiter. Herausgegeben von Birgitta Wolf. Berlin 1981.
- Ende der Vergeltung – Utopie? Konsequenzmaßnahmen statt Strafe. In: Helmut Ortner (Hrsg.) Freiheit statt Strafe. Plädoyers für die Abschaffung der Gefängnisse. Frankfurt 1981, S. 14–32.
- Fallet Alexander: ett beslagtaget barn [Alexander: ein konfisziertes Kind], Stockholm 1986.
- „Es kommt ja keine Fee“ – biographische Anmerkungen über die Arbeit mit Gefangenen. In: Uta Klein / Helmut H. Koch (Hrsg.) Gefangenenliteratur. Hagen 1988, S. 14–28.
- Gedichte eines Lebens als Biografie. München 1998.

== Awards ==
- 1971 - Fritz Bauer Prize
- 1985 - Federal Cross of Merit, First Class
- 1996 - Courage Prize of the Green Party parliamentary group in the Landtag of Bavaria

== Literature ==
- Christian Pfeiffer: Die Ombudsfrau des deutschen Strafvollzuges. Nachruf auf Birgitta Wolf. In: Forum Strafvollzug. 58. Jahrgang, Nr. 3, 2009, ISSN 1865-1534, S. 149–152 (PDF; 3,3 MB).
