= Svensk Lufttrafik =

Swedish airline, 1919–1923

Svensk Lufttrafik (SLA, SLAB, Svenska Lufttrafikbolaget) was a Swedish airline based in Stockholm. The company was founded on 7 February 1919, its first flight running on the 7 August 1920. Flight operations of the company were terminated in 1921.

SLAB operated air-mail services in co-operation with Deutsche Luft-Reederei, a Lufthansa precursor, and operated a regular passenger service Copenhagen–Malmö–Warnemünde. In 1921 the company built the Lindarängen seaplane airport (Lindarängens flyghamn) in Stockholm and started regular services to Reval, (later known as Tallinn, capital of Estonia) with a Junkers F.13 and two Savoia S-16 flying boats. The fleet also included 10 LVG C.VI aircraft from the German Luftverkehrsgesellschaft, of which only two remained airworthy after the liquidation of the company.

Lindarängen airport was sold to the City of Stockholm after the dissolution of Svensk Luftrafik in 1923 and remained in operation until 1952.

During the first half of 1920, the later German Nazi-Leader Hermann Göring was employed as a pilot with the company and on February 21, flew Count Eric von Rosen to his estate Rockelstad where Göring met his first wife, the Swedish national Carin von Kantzow.

== Notes / References ==
- This article is based on the entry of the Swedish version of Wikipedia, which may offer further references.
