= Jaktstuguskogen Nature Reserve =

Nature reserve in Södermanland, Sweden

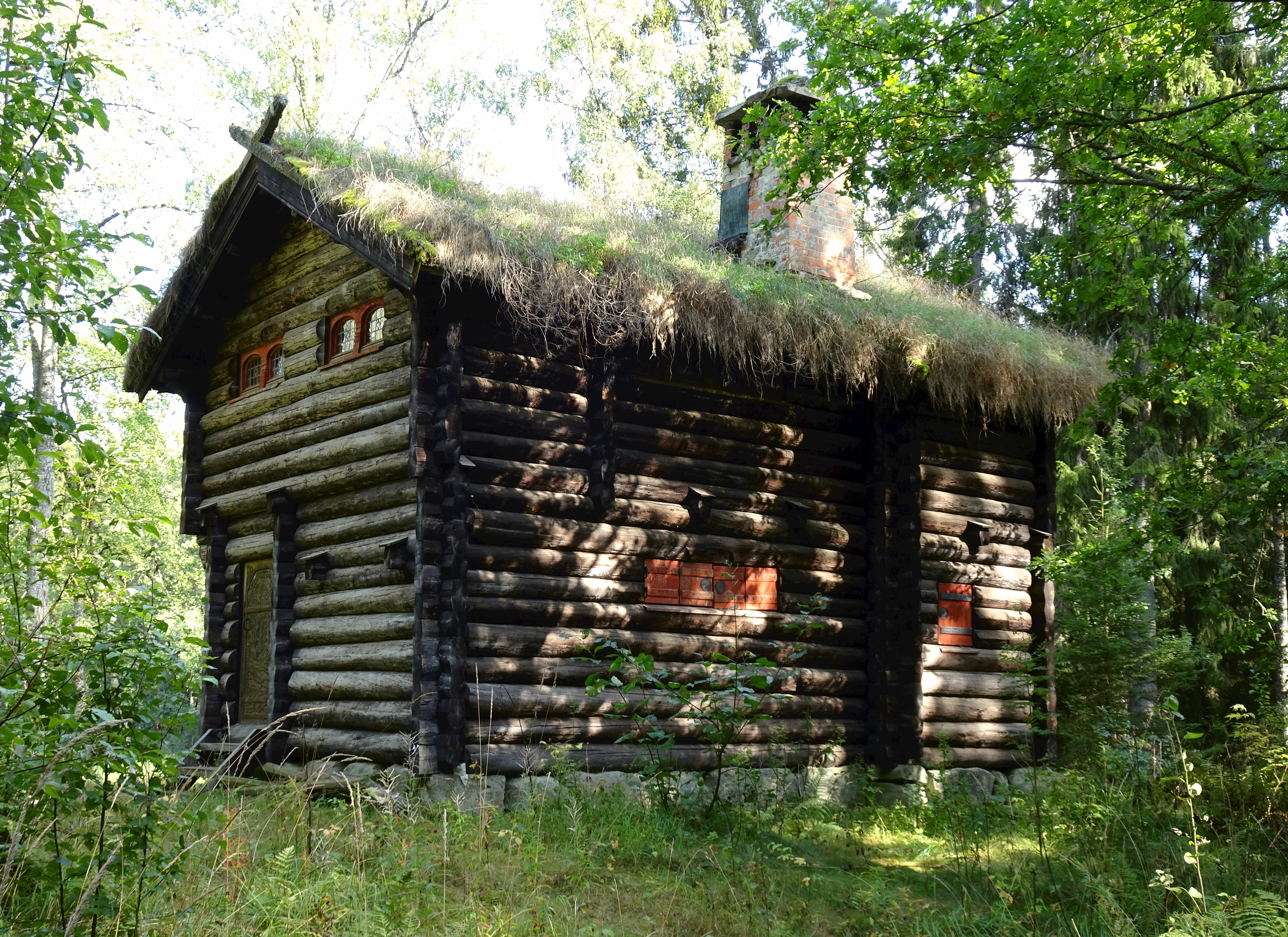
- The hunting lodge, built in 1909

- Location within Södermanland Location within Sweden
- Location: Sweden
- Nearest city: Flen
- Coordinates: 59°03′00″N 16°49′12″E
- Area: 52.8 ha (130 acres)
- Established: 1919

Jaktstuguskogen Nature Reserve (Swedish: Jaktstuguskogens naturreservat) is a nature reserve in Södermanland County, on the southeast coast of Sweden. Established in 1919, it is the oldest nature reserve in the county and the first natural monument of Sweden.

== History ==
From at least the 18th century and until the late 19th century, the area was used as pasture. In 1909, a small lake was created here, and the hunting lodge (jaktstuga in Swedish) that has given the name to the reserve was built by the owner of nearby Rockelstad Castle, Eric von Rosen. In 1919, Eric von Rosen requested the area to be declared a natural monument, and it subsequently became the first nature reserve in Södermaland County as well as the first natural monument declared in Sweden. In 1949 the County Government decided, again after a request by the von Rosen family, to reduce the protected area, and in 2001 it was enlarged again. The centenary of the nature reserve was celebrated in 2019 with events such as guided tours and a speech by County Governor Liselott Hagberg.

== Nature ==
The nature reserve is dominated by spruce forest. The area contains both low-lying parts and several small hills. The forest is around 120 years old in the lower parts of the reserve but of considerably higher age in other places. There are also bogs and areas of swamp forest in the reserve. The relatively undisturbed old-growth forest contains much decaying wood which provides a habitat for several species of beetles, including the red-listed Mycetina cruciata. Decaying trees, as well as stone blocks, also provide a habitat for mosses and fungi, of which 15 red-listed species have been identified in the nature reserve including Pycnoporellus fulgens, Phellopilus nigrolimitatus and Clavaria fumosa. The reserve also supports a rich bird life, including several woodpecker species. The nature reserve forms part of the EU-wide Natura 2000 network.

The nature reserve provides the area with protection against exploitation and forestry. The nature reserve is open to visitors, for which a path has been prepared and maintained, but it is forbidden e.g. to pitch a tent, make a fire, ride or in other ways disturb the wildlife within the reserve.

== Hunting lodge ==
The hunting lodge is a log house designed by architects Ivar Tengbom and Ernst Torulf in a National Romantic style, intended to resemble a Viking house. It is decorated with depictions of dragons and Fenrir, as well as swastikas. The lodge lies in a clearing and adjacent to an outhouse and a root cellar. The lodge is a listed building in the buildings database of the Swedish National Heritage Board.
