= Eric von Rosen =

Swedish noble, explorer, and Nazi (1879–1948)

Count Eric von Rosen
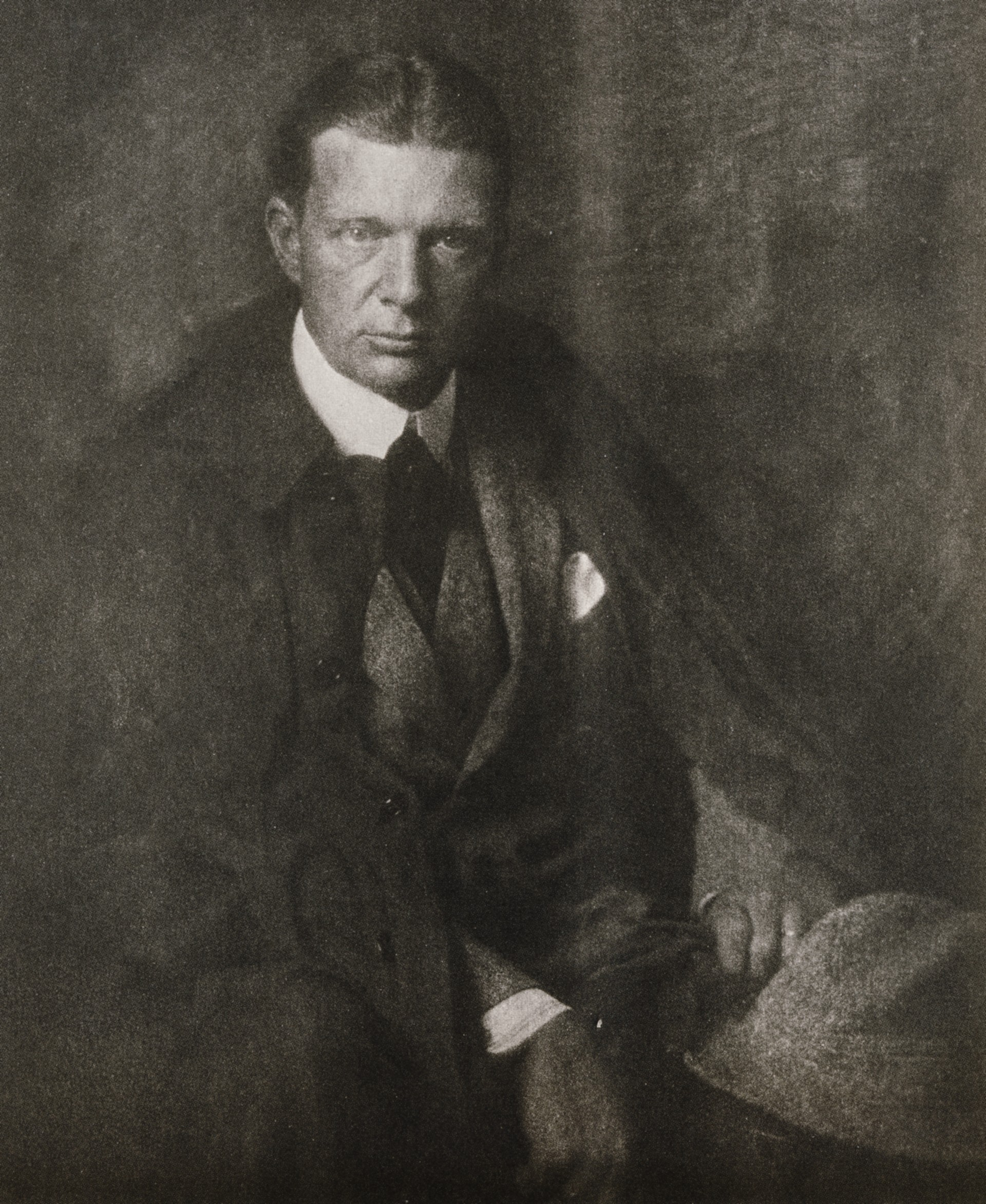
- Portrait of Eric von Rosen, c. 1919
- Born: June 2, 1879
- Died: April 25, 1948 (aged 68)
- Occupations: explorer; ethnographer; pilot; politician
- Political party: National Socialist Bloc (1933-1938)
- Spouse: Mary Fock (m. 1905)
- Children: 7, including Carl Gustaf & Birgitta
- Parents: Carl Gustaf von Rosen (father); Ella Carlton Moore (mother)
- Awards: Order of the Cross of Liberty

Count Carl Gustaf Bloomfield Eric von Rosen (2 June 1879 in Stockholm – 25 April 1948 Skeppsholmen, Stockholm) was a Swedish honorary doctor, patron, explorer, ethnographer and prominent figure in the Swedish upper class. His early life involved ethnographic expeditions to South America and Africa. However, his enduring legacy centers on his active promotion of nordicism, eugenics and national socialism. His political work culminated in co-founding the Swedish National Socialist Bloc, which sought alignment with Nazi Germany. Eric von Rosen also maintained a close personal connection to German aviator and politician Hermann Göring.

== Early life ==
Lesser coat of arms of von Rosen

Carl Gustaf Bloomfield Eric von Rosen was born on 2 June 1879 in Stockholm. His father Carl Gustaf von Rosen (15 August 1824 – 1 January 1909) had been a naval officer in the Swedish Navy, as well as courtier to the Swedish crown, as heir to the von Rosen hereditary Swedish noble family. His mother was Ella von Rosen (née Carlton Moore), the daughter of the American philanthropist and philosopher Clara Jessup Moore, the heir to the fortunes of Philadelphia paper magnate Bloomfield Haines Moore, a descendant of the Winthrop family. Eric von Rosen had three brothers, Reinhold von Rosen (b. 1865) , Clarence von Rosen (b. 1867), Eugene von Rosen (b. 1870), and one sister Maud von Rosen (b. 1872).

Eric von Rosen was raised and grew up in the von Rosenska Palace at Djurgårdsbron, Stockholm. von Rosen completed his secondary education in Visby, graduating in 1900. It is believed that while on a school trip in Gotland, von Rosen reportedly observed a swastika on a runestone from the Viking Age, adopting the motif as a personal symbol of good luck. Knowing that the symbol signified good luck for the Vikings, he utilized the symbol and had it carved into all his luggage when going on an expedition to South America in 1901.

== Career ==
=== Lapland (1900) ===
In the summer of 1900, a young von Rosen conducted an early journey through the Swedish Lapland alongside Henric Horn af Åminne. The expedition operated out of Rosendal, a hunting cabin owned by the family near the Stora Sjöfallet waterfall, and conducted a number of activities in the study of sieidi - sites of prominent cultural importance to Sámi peoples.

In 1901, von Rosen studied at the department of ethnography at the Swedish Museum of Natural History (now the Museum of Ethnography, Sweden) under curator Hjalmar Stolpe.

=== Chaco-Cordillera Expedition (1901-1902) ===
On 25 March 1901, von Rosen departed Stockholm as part of the Chaco-Cordillera Expedition led by Erland Nordenskiöld, with the aim of studying the border regions of Bolivia and Argentina. Fellow members of the expedition included Robert Elias Fries, Gustaf von Hofsten and Eric Boman. The expedition proceeded to Salta by October 1901, passing through Casabindo, before extending into Tarija and along the Pilcomayo River, with the expedition concluding on 27 June 1902. The expedition conducted excavations, procured artifacts from indigenous groups, and conducted ethnographic photography.

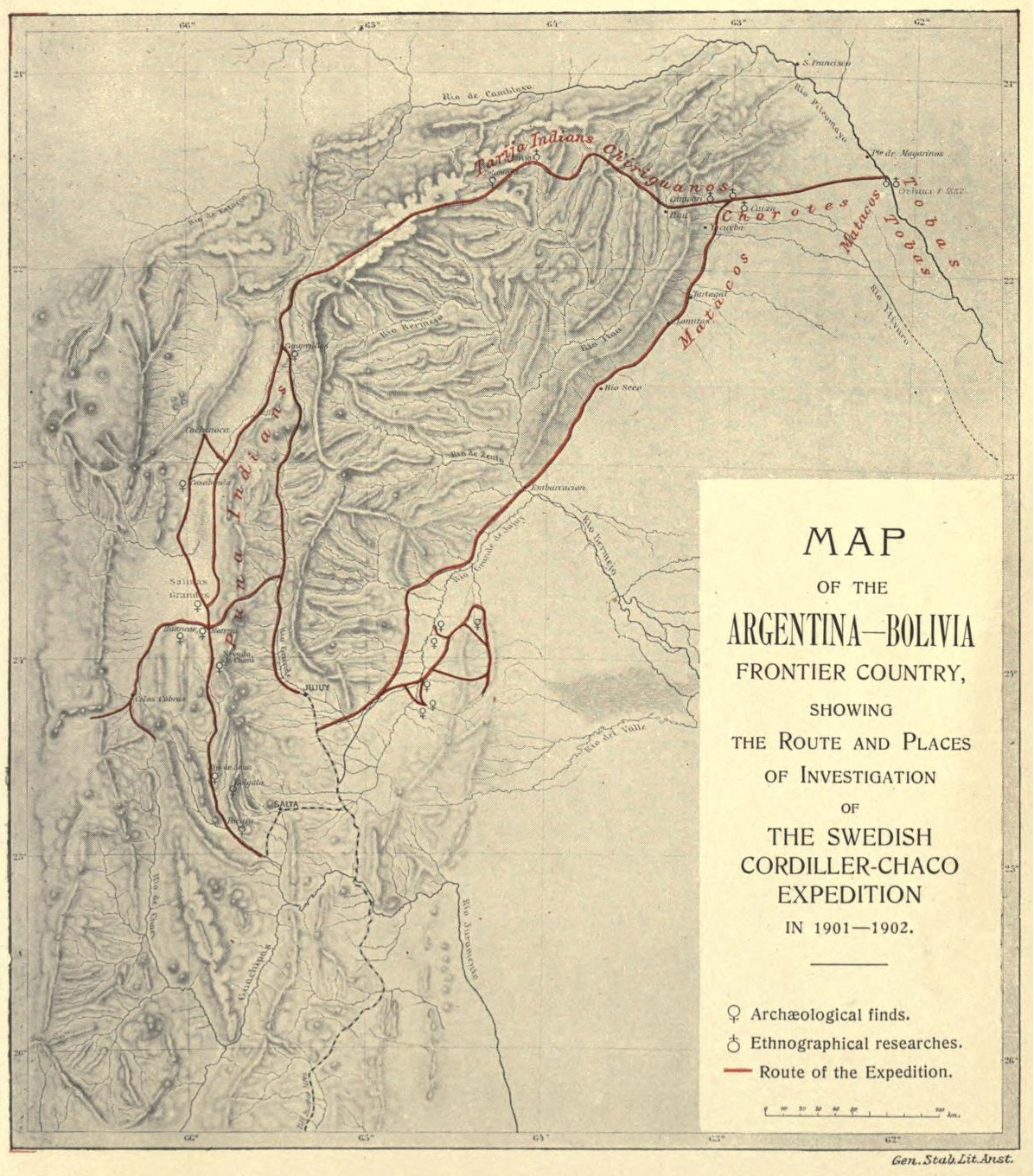
Expedition map

von Rosen with natives of Gran Chaco.

von Rosen with a captured vulture

Gran Chaco

von Rosen in expedition attire

During the expedition, von Rosen summited the Nevado de Cachi. Von Rosen conducted archeological investigations, contributing to the understanding of pre-Columbian Andean metallurgy and local material culture, described in his 1903 publication Ethnographical Research Work During the Swedish Chaco-Cordillera Expedition, 1901-1902.

In 1904, Eric von Rosen was awarded the Linnaeus Medal of the Royal Swedish Academy of Sciences for his contributions towards ethnography and natural history. In the same year, von Rosen represented the Swedish Society for Anthropology and Geography at the Internationaler Amerikanisten Kongress in Stuttgart.

=== White Nile Expedition (1909) ===
In 1909, von Rosen carried out a personal expedition travelling through Egypt and Sudan. The expedition was characterised by von Rosen as a hunting trip, rather than a scientific expedition. Nonetheless, von Rosen engaged in documenting the culture of local Sudanese tribes.

=== Rhodesia-Congo Expedition (1911-1912) ===
In 1911, von Rosen led the Swedish Rhodesia-Congo Expedition alongside biologist Robert Elias Fries, with a focus on ethnographic and botanical research of southern and central Africa, with a particular focus on the Lake Bangweulu region of Northern Rhodesia. (Note: present day Zambia)

Batwa people of the Bangweulu Wetlands.

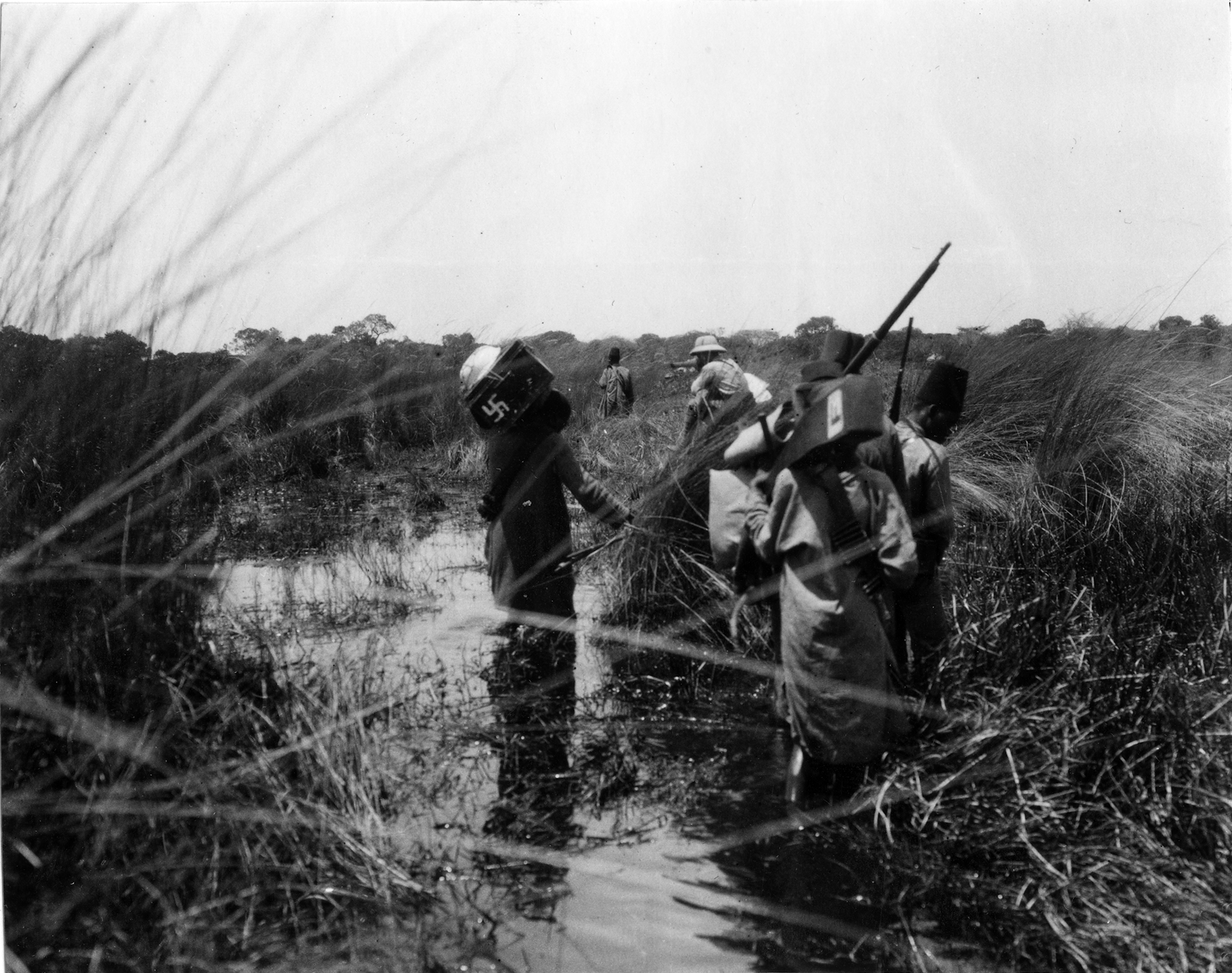
Porters carrying luggage. von Rosen's personal swastika is visible.

Fort Rosebery

Porters walking through grassland

Batwa gravesite

The expedition departed Sweden on 13 June 1911, arriving in Cape Town in July. From here, the expedition embarked on a route by rail on the Cape to Cairo Railway past Victoria Falls and Broken Hill. (Note: Kabwe) The zenith of the expedition was the groups journey into the Bangweulu Wetlands close to the Belgian Congo, where von Rosen focused his activities on documenting the Batwa peoples. The expedition gathered a significant collection of artifacts, plant specimens and photographic documentation.The Vernonia rosenii was named after von Rosen. The expedition culminated in the group travelling further northwards to Alexandria, Egypt.

Upon returning to Sweden, von Rosen published Träskfolket (Note: The Swamp People), documenting his encounters in the Bangweulu region. The expedition work as further collated into the Wissenschaftliche Ergebnisse der Schwedischen Rhodesia-Kongo-Expedition, 1911-1912.

=== Later career ===
Amidst the institutions closer alignment with the Nazi regime, von Rosen was awarded an honorary doctorate in philosophy by the University of Cologne in 1938.

Eric von Rosen, alongside contemporaries such as Sven Hedin and Ivar Tengbom, was a member of the Riksföreningen Sverige-Tyskland, a Swedish nationalist academic association that aimed to promote alignment and a favourable view of Nazi Germany. von Rosen was a member for the organisation until its disbandment 1943, following the German perpetration of the holocaust in Norway.

== Politics ==
=== Anti labour movement ===
During the 1909 Swedish general strike delivered a speech to the Working Men's Union of Sparreholm, Södermanland and later to an audience of social democrats and socialists at the Folkets Hus in Stockholm, titled A Non-Socialist's Thoughts on the Strike and Kindred Questions. von Rosen expressed contention with the strikes, arguing that they fundamentally harmed Swedish national unity, instead advocating for a nationalist form of class harmony, under a shared sense of Swedish traditional values and monarchist loyalty.

=== Relationship to Hermann Göring ===
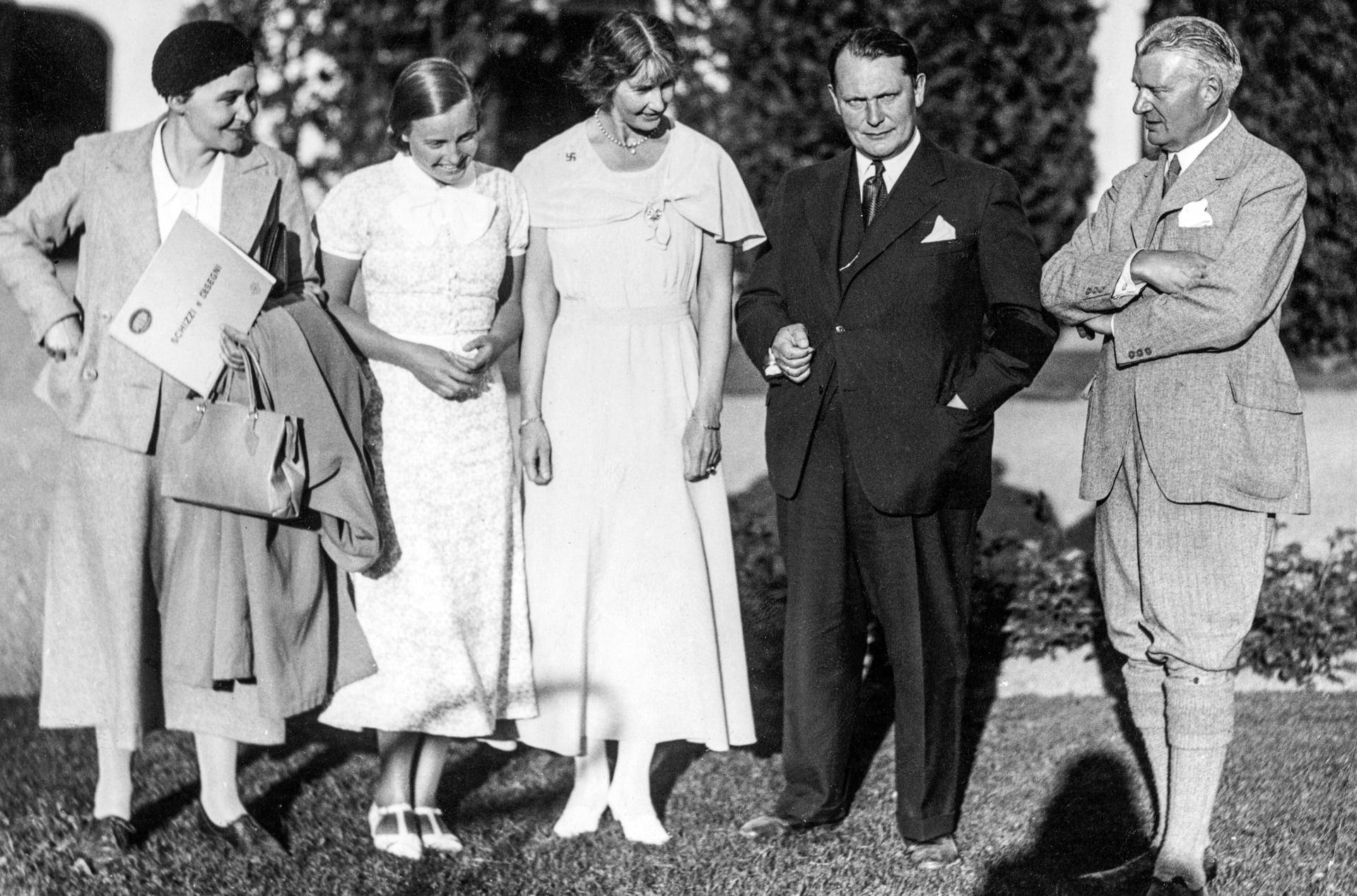
Birgitta, Mary, Herman Göring and Eric von Rosen at Rockelstad in 1933

In February 1919, Eric von Rosen hired Hermann Göring, who was then flying for the Swedish airline Svensk Lufttrafik to fly him from Stockholm to Rockelstad Castle. The World War I flying ace piloted the count through a severe snowstorm, before landing on the frozen Lake Båven. The pilot impressed von Rosen, who was invited to stay the night. Göring may at this time have first seen the swastika emblem, which Rosen had set in the chimney piece as a family badge.

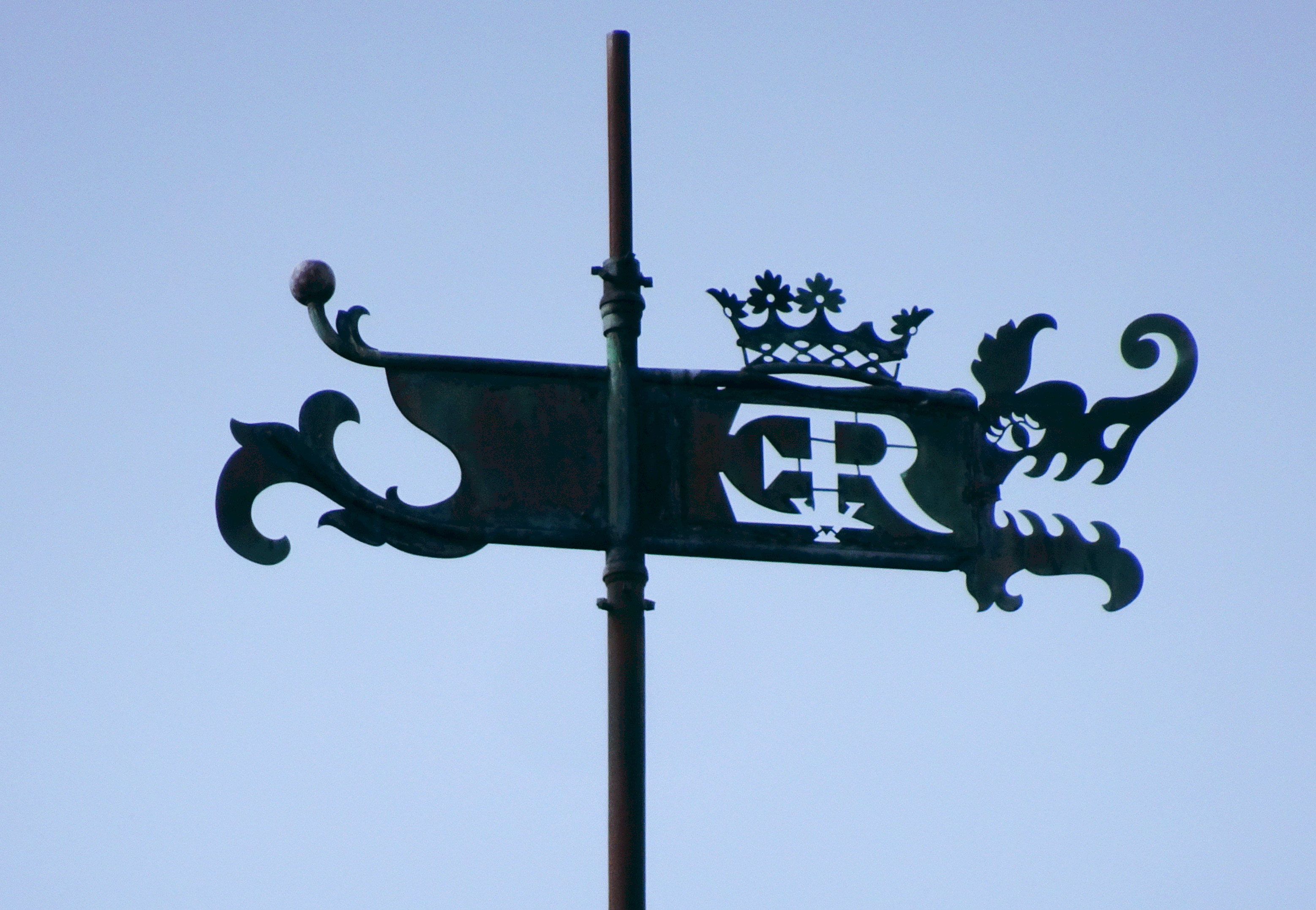
Monogram of Eric von Rosen visible at Rockelstad Castle.

This was also the first time that Göring saw his future wife; the count introduced his sister-in-law, Carin von Kantzow. Estranged from her husband of 10 years, she had an eight-year-old son. Göring was immediately infatuated and asked her to meet him in Stockholm. Carin obtained a divorce, followed Göring to Munich and married him on 3 February 1922, making the two men brothers-in-law. In 1940, describing their friendship, von Rosen stated:

Hermann Goering is close to me through family relationship. I know him as a man who loves peace with all his heart and who has wide cultural interests. What he can do for Sweden he has done, with the help of Hitler, and I am convinced he will always work in that direction. Sweden can count on the goodwill that Marshal Goering in collaboration with Hitler will always have for us.

Eric's son, Carl Gustaf von Rosen's career in aviation can be partially attributed to the influence of his uncle, following Göring taking the 11 year old on his first flight in February 1920.

Eric von Rosen maintained connections with Göring as late as 1945. A May 1945 report from the American legation in Stockholm alleged that von Rosen's son, Carl Gustaf von Rosen, facilitated Hermann Göring's smuggling of looted artworks into Sweden. However, subsequent archival examinations of Eric von Rosen's papers by Sweden's Commission on Jewish Assets did not rule out, but found no corroborating evidence for such transfers or any related commentary from von Rosen himself on wartime dealings or their aftermath.

=== Antisemitism ===
In his essay Judar och judar published in the newspaper Svenska Dagbladet in 1929, von Rosen dwells on alleged "Jewish influence" and claims that regardless of how educated, intelligent or socially integrated individuals of Jewish origin are inherently incapable of grasping the "Germanic spirit", or the "primeval Swedish" essence of national culture. He contended that this inherent, spiritual, or biological difference made it impossible for Jewish critics to accurately interpret Swedish literature, accusing them of fostering a "denationalisation" of the national culture.

=== Swedish National Socialist Block ===
Flag of the National Socialist Bloc

In 1933, von Rosen alongside his brother Clarence von Rosen, as well as Finnish Civil War veteran and perpetrator of the Viipuri massacre Martin Ekström founded the Nazi aligned National Socialist Bloc, through the merger of several minor parties. The party used a blue flag with a yellow curved swastika as the charge, derived from the personal mark of von Rosen.

Poster from the National Socialist Bloc, announcing a 1935 meeting with von Rosen as its main speaker.

In a radio interview in 1936, von Rosen put forward his views:

I found in Germany exactly what I hoped for our own country: rebirth of the Nordic spirit, and Nordic essence in all areas of life. The people's soul, it is something so important that if the people's soul dies, then the people of its physical descendants follows. We have Greeks today who may be physically descended from the ancient Hellenes, but the Hellenic people have been extinct for a couple of thousand years. The Hellenic spirit is dead and in the same way I fear the Nordic spirit will be undermined.

In contrast to the populist nature of the German Nazi Party, von Rosen sought to align the NSB as an elite movement, emphasising paternalistic leadership and societal cohesion. Anti-communism and anti unionism emerged as a core tenet of von Rosen's beliefs, decrying the influence of the Soviet Union on leftist movements in Sweden in particular. In the 1920s, von Rosen is stated as reacting strongly against the "jazz culture that ruled amongst the youth."

The National Socialist Block largely collapsed following the departure of Martin Ekström and his participation in the Winter War, although the party claimed its continued existence as late as 1941. von Rosen would continue to express support for national socialist principles into the early 1940s, although his influenced waned due to Sweden's neutrality during World War II.

== Finnish Air Force and the von Rosen swastika ==
=== Personal symbol ===
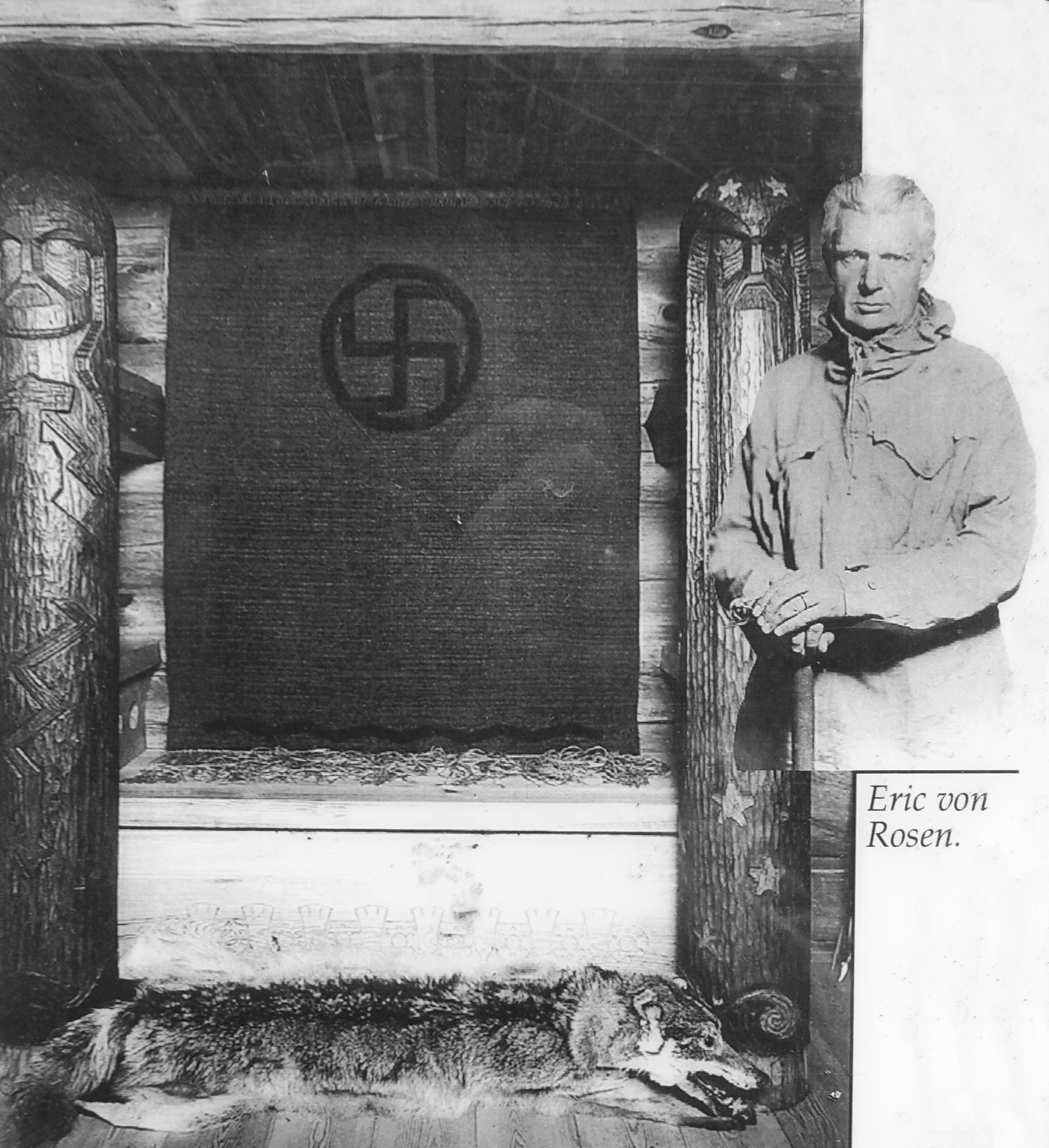
Interior of Eric von Rosen's jaktstuga

Eric von Rosen had been using a swastika as a personal owner's mark. He originally saw the symbol on runestones in Gotland, while at school. Knowing that the symbol signified good luck for the Vikings, he utilized the symbol and had it carved into all his luggage when going on an expedition to South America in 1901. It is also found in the hunting lodge he commissioned Ivar Tengbom and Ernst Torulf to build in what is now Jaktstuguskogen Nature Reserve, in 1909.

Göring had noted the swastika during his stay in Sweden and at von Rosens' castle (forged into a metal piece at the fireplace). However, the swastika of the German Nazi party had been adopted already in 1920, two years before Göring met Adolf Hitler.

=== Finnish Air Force ===
Finnish Air Force roundel, 1918

Following the Finnish Declaration of Independence on 6 December 1917, and subsequent Finnish Civil War, the Swedish government officially declined to provide military aid to the fledgling country. However, a number of Swedish citizens raised funds through the organization Finlands vänner (Swedish for 'Friends of Finland'). One 6 March 1918, von Rosen donated his personal aircraft, a Thulin D to the Finnish White Guard, with the aircraft being flown by pilot Nils Kindberg along with von Rosen to Vaasa. von Rosen had painted his personal symbol of good fortune, the blue swastika, on the aircraft. As the flight had been conducted without official permission and contravened Swedish government policy, Kindberg was fined 100 kronor upon his return to Sweden. The arrival of F.1 is regarded by the Finnish Air Force as the birth of Finnish military aviation, and 6 March is commemorated as the founding date of the service.

On 13 March 1918, the commander of the aviation forces in Finland, the Swedish officer John-Allan Hygerth, proposed that the "von Rosen Swastika" be adopted as the mark of the service. On 18 March 1918, the swastika was adopted as the roundel of the newly formed Finnish Air Force by Carl Gustaf Emil Mannerheim, additionally specifying a fin flash derived from the Flag of the Swedish-speaking Finns.

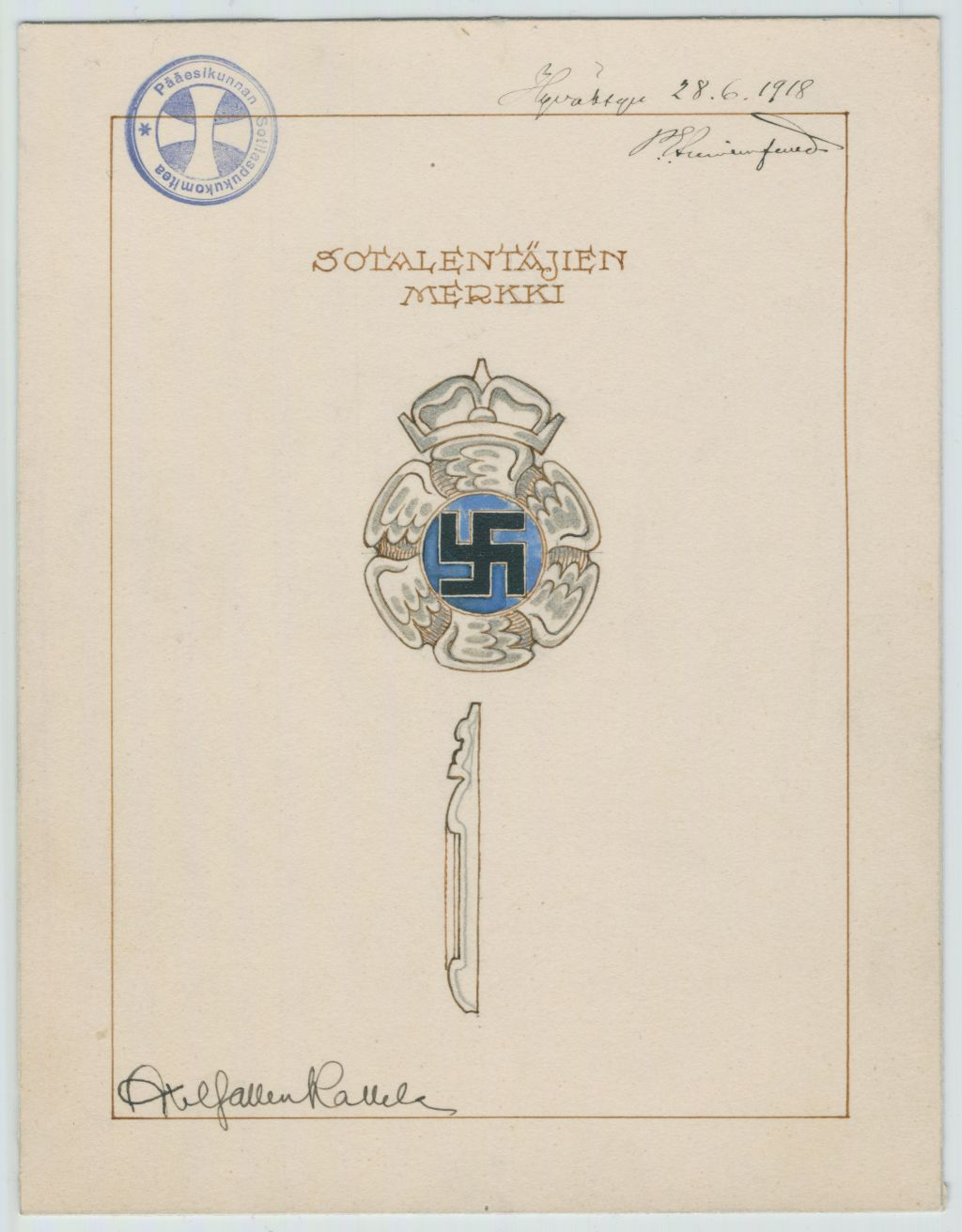
Pilots badge as designed by Akseli Gallen-Kallela, 1918

Despite common thought, the swastika did not newly appear in Finnish heraldry following von Rosen's gift, with its use already widespread in nationalist and romanticist circles, but its use greatly expanded following its adoption by the Finnish Air Force. Further state insignia such as the Standard of the President of Finland, and the Order of the Cross of Liberty, were designed by Akseli Gallen-Kallela, a painter and leading figure of Finnish romantic nationalism. Gallen-Kallela was already familiar with the motif, and was said to have "fallen in love" with the Swastika. The painter most prominently incorporated it into his Kalevala-themed Aino-triptych in 1889, in a period described by historian Malcolm Quinn as "a decade of Aryan mania".

Following the Moscow Armistice in September 1944, Finland was compelled to remove symbols associated with fascism under the supervision of the Allied Control Commission. As a result, the Finnish Air Force replaced the swastika insignia on its aircraft with a blue and white roundel, which is in use to this day. The symbol continued to appear in certain unit emblems, flags, and decorations after the war. In 2020, the Finnish Air Force removed the swastika from the emblem of the Air Force Command.

Finnish Air Force aircraft named after Kreivi von Rosen

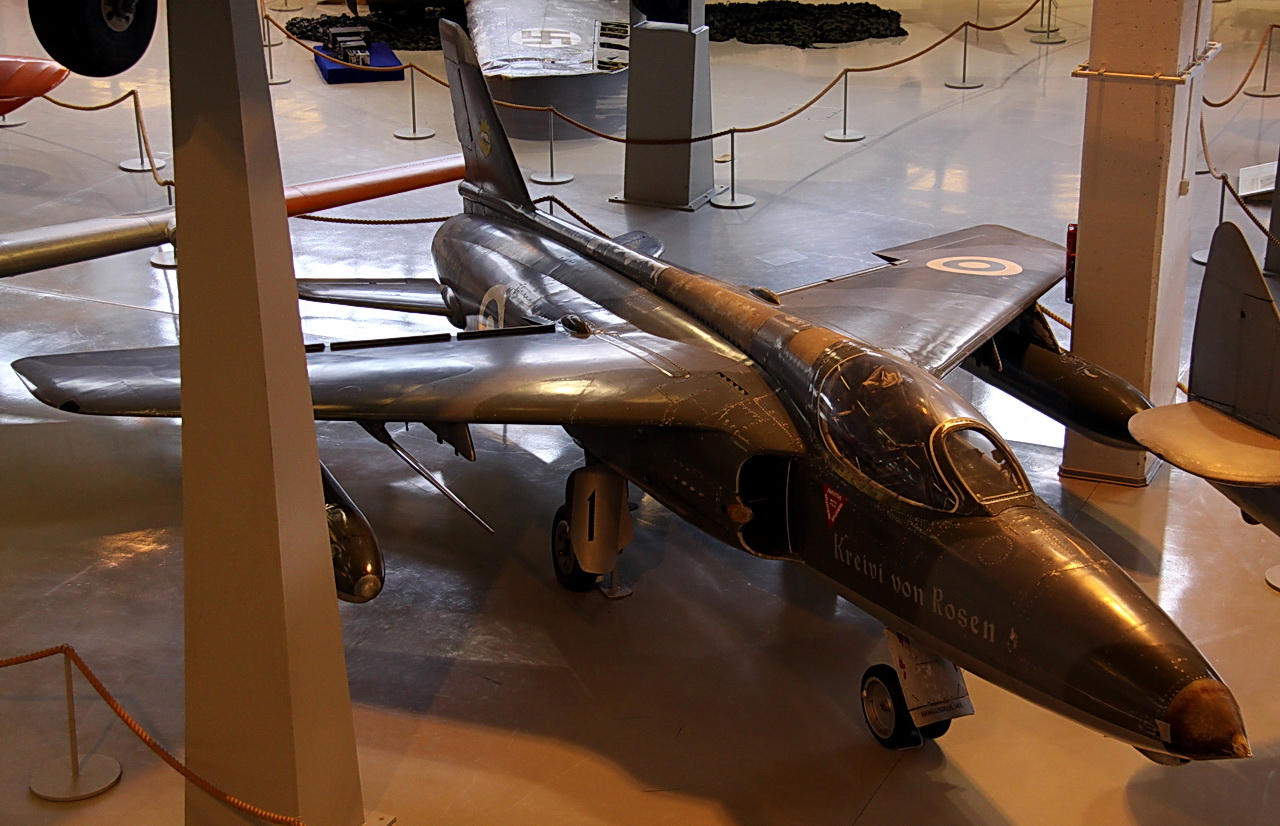
Folland Gnat

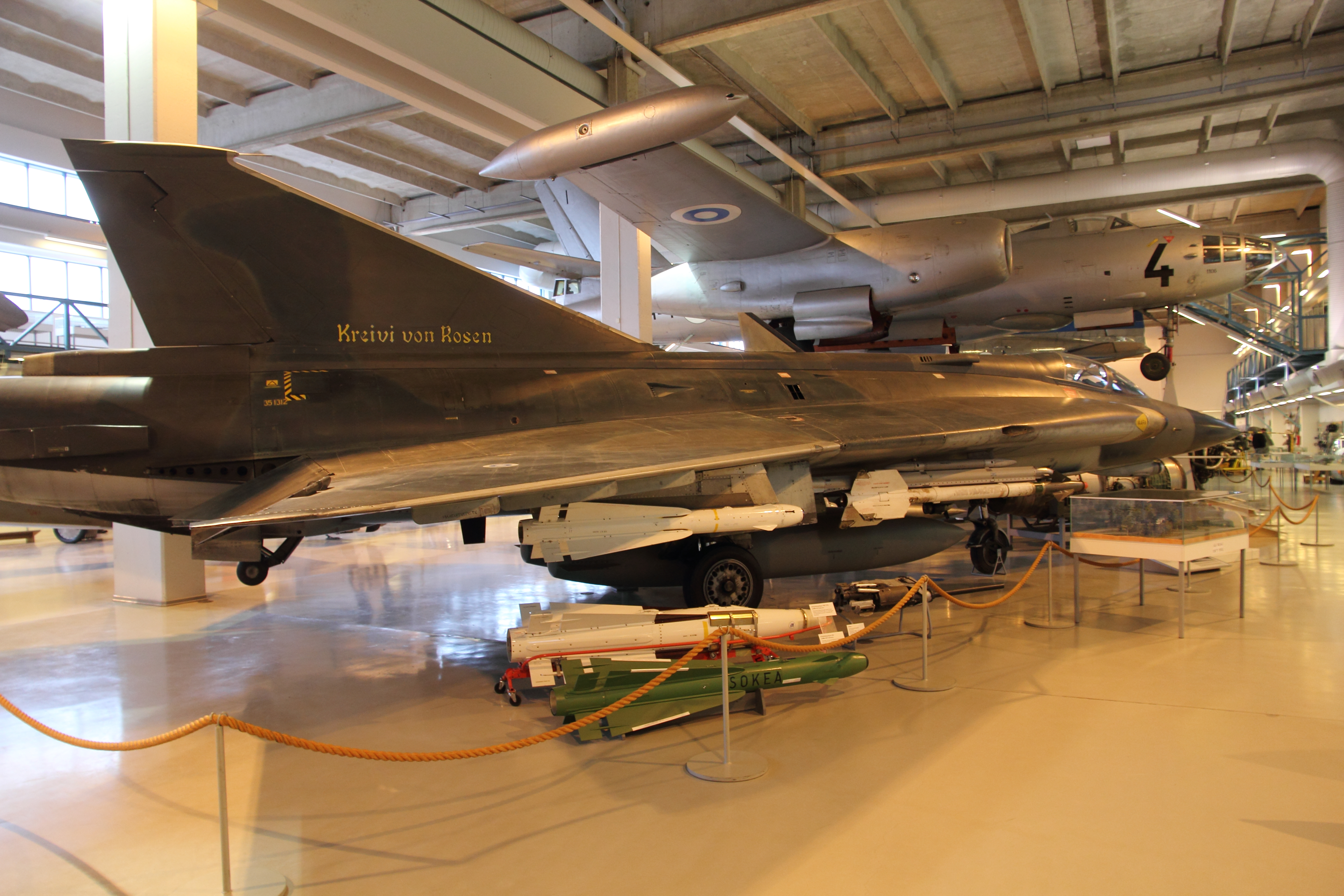
Saab 35 Draken

McDonnell Douglas F/A-18C Hornet

Several aircraft that have been operated by the Finnish Air Force have been named "Kreivi von Rosen" in honour of the count.

== Personal life ==
=== Property ===
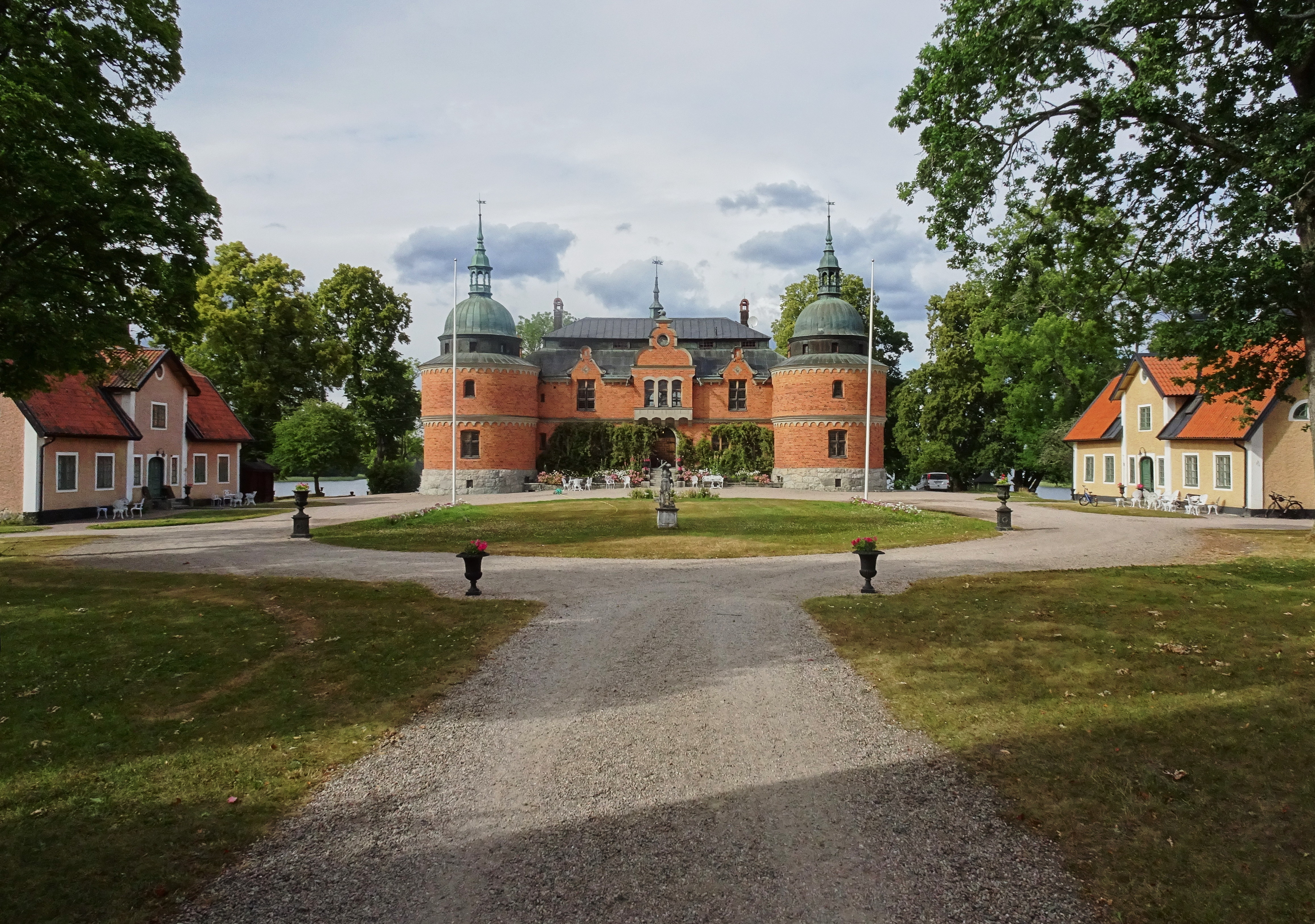
Rockelstad Castle.

In 1900, Rockelstad Castle in Södermanland was acquired by Eric von Rosen. An extensive renovation occurred under the watch of architect Ivar Tengbom based on the design of the neighbouring Vibyholm Castle. In the manor house, von Rosen displayed his extensive collection. In the 1930s, the residence underwent another series of renovations. His later brother in law and Nazi German politician Hermann Göring would spend a significant time at Rockelstad.

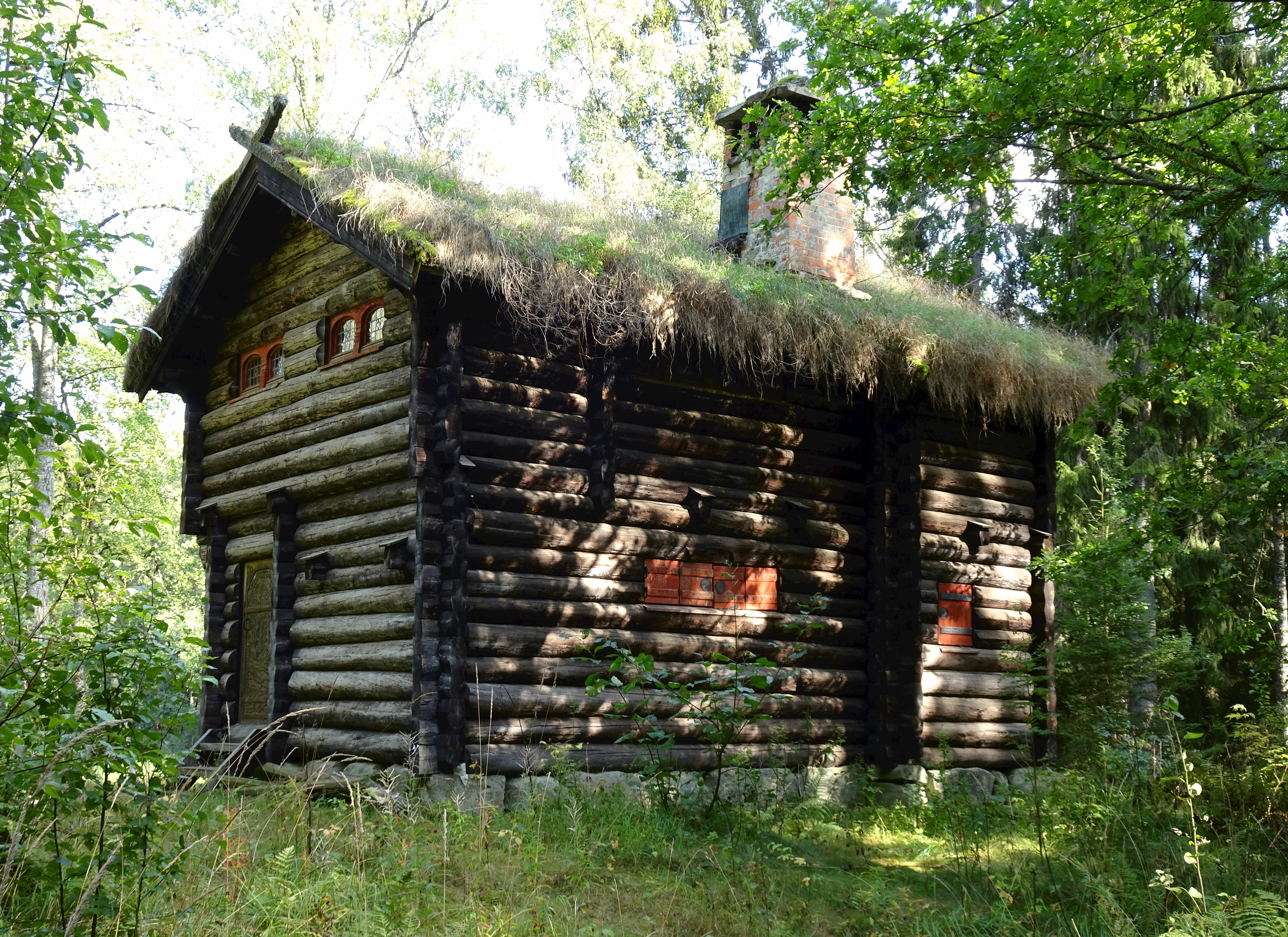
Eric von Rosen's hunting cabin.

In 1909, von Rosen commissioned a hunting cabin in the nearby Jaktstuguskogen Nature Reserve. Designed by Ivar Tengbom in Old Norse style, the hunting lodge was built to "raise the magical atmosphere" of the forest. The cabin was built incorporating decorations of hunting scenes with dragons, fenrir, ouroboros and swastika. Inside the cabin rests a throne flanked by carvings of Thor and Odin. In the centre of the cabin is the house mark of von Rosen, a square swastika. In 1919, von Rosen requested that the Jaktstuguskogen Nature Reserve be declared a natural monument, and it subsequently became the first nature reserve in Södermanland as well as the first natural monument declared in Sweden.

=== Marriage and family ===
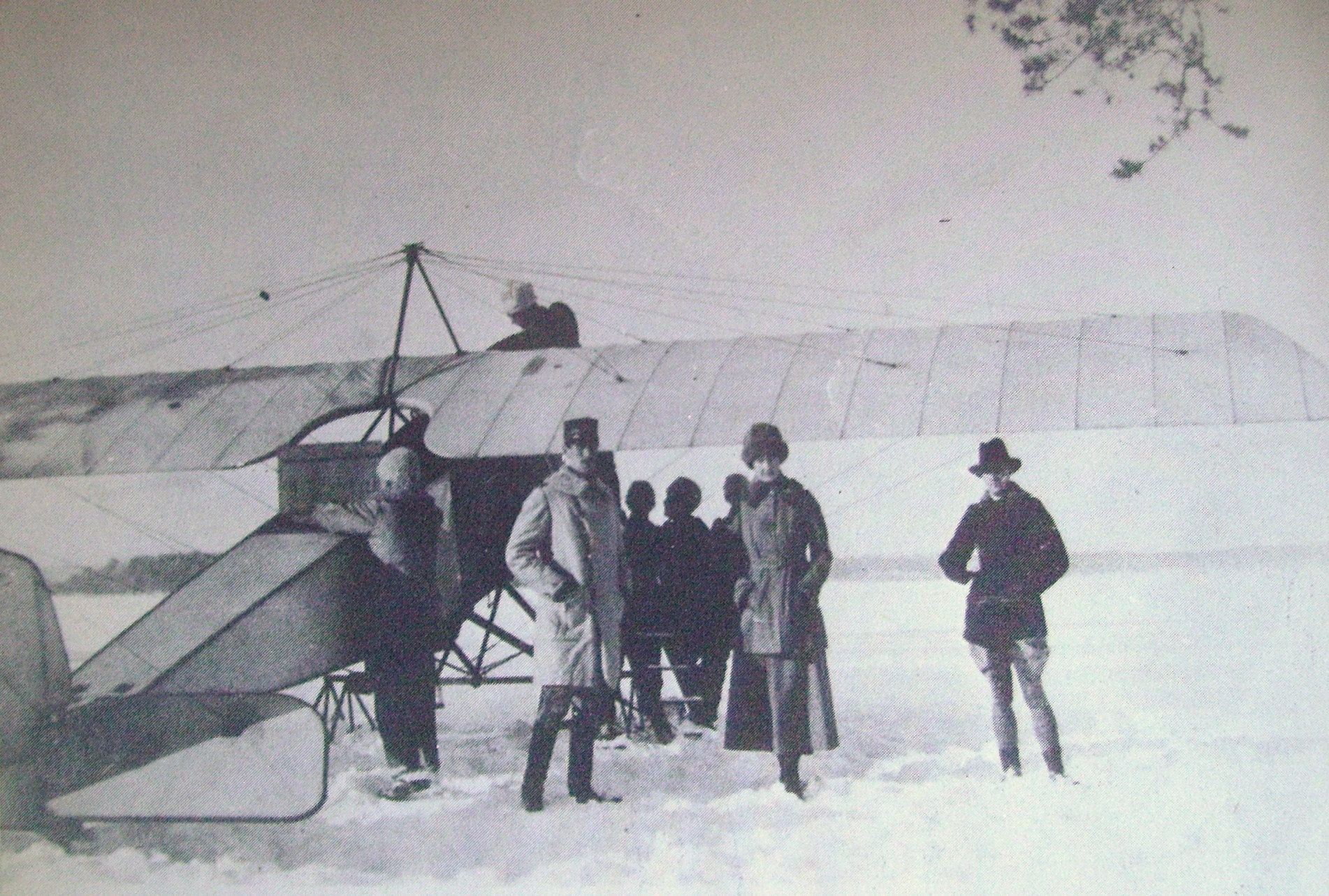
Mary and Eric von Rosen in Umeå near a Thulin D plane, 1918.

On 19 January 1905, Eric von Rosen married Lutheran religious activist Mary Fock in Stockholm. Born 5 February 1886, Mary was the third daughter of the Swedish diplomat Carl Alexander Foch.

The von Rosen's had six children: Bjorn (born 1905), Mary (born 1906), Carl Gustaf von Rosen (born 1909), Birgitta (born 1913), Egil (born 1919), and Anna (born 1926). Carl Gustaf von Rosen would follow in his fathers footsteps, with an interest in exploration and aviation, becoming a mercenary aviator in Ethiopia, Finland and Biafra.

In 1932, von Rosen's daughter Mary married Nils Silfverskiöld, a Swedish Olympic gymnast and orthopedic surgeon with strong anti-Nazi and pro-Soviet views. Their wedding took place at Rockelstad Castle. This resulted in a scandal when all the attendants but the groom and bridge performed a Nazi salute following a toast by Hermann Göring. Silfverskiöld and von Rosen had a daughter Monica Getz, a diplomat, educator and activist and the wife of American jazz saxophonist Stan Getz.

In 1937, the Swedish crown prince Carl Bernadotte married Eric von Rosen's niece, the Countess Elsa von Rosen.

His grandson (through Birgitta) is the film director Peter Nestler, who in 2009 made a film about Rosen called Death and Devil (Tod und Teufel).

== Awards ==
- Order of the Cross of Liberty, 2nd Class - 1918

== Ancestors ==
Ancestors of Eric von Rosen

8. Count Gustaf Fredrik von Rosen
4. Count Gustaf Robert von Rosen
9. Maria Julia Wahrendorff
2. Count Carl Gustaf von Rosen
10. Baron Per Gustaf Lagerstråle
Baroness Beata Louisa Carolina Lagerstrale
11. Baroness Beata Catharina Lovisa Cederström
1. Count Carl Gustaf Bloomfield Eric von Rosen
12. Samuel French Moore
6. Bloomfield Haines Moore
13. Rachel Matlack Haines
3. Ella Carlton Moore
14. Augustus Edward Jessup
7. Clara Sophia Jessup Bloomfield-Moore
15. Lydia Eager Mosely
