= John Ernst Worrell Keely =

American inventor and fraud (1837–1898)

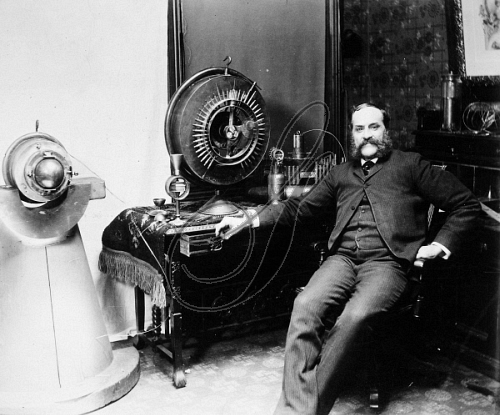
- Keely c. 1895 with a nonfunctional "Keely Engine"
- Born: September 3, 1837; Chester, Pennsylvania, U.S.
- Died: November 18, 1898 (aged 61); Philadelphia, Pennsylvania, U.S.
- Burial place: West Laurel Hill Cemetery, Bala Cynwyd, Pennsylvania, U.S.
- Occupations: Inventor, Fraudster
- Years active: 1872–1897
- Organization: Keely Motor Company
- Notable work: Keely engine

John Ernst Worrell Keely (September 3, 1837 – November 18, 1898) was an American fraudster and self-proclaimed inventor from Philadelphia who claimed to have discovered a new motive power which was initially described as "vaporic" or "etheric" force, and later as an unnamed force based on "vibratory sympathy", by which he produced "interatomic ether" from water and air. Keely's claims were highly disputed throughout his career and, in the 21st century, are generally considered to be pseudoscientific.

Keely secured substantial investments from many people, including John Jacob Astor IV. Despite numerous requests from the stockholders of the Keely Motor Company, which had been established to produce a practicable motor based on his work, he consistently refused to fully discuss the principles on which his motor supposedly operated and also repeatedly refused demands to produce a marketable product by claiming that he needed to perfect his inventions. He became embroiled in several lawsuits, and after Keely's death, evidence of his elaborate fraud was discovered.

== Biography ==
Born in Chester, Pennsylvania, John Keely was orphaned in early childhood and was raised by his grandparents. Before becoming an inventor, he worked as a member of a theatrical orchestra, a painter, a carpenter, a carnival barker, and as a mechanic.

== Career ==
In 1872, Keely invited scientists to a demonstration at his laboratory at 1422 North Twentieth Street, Philadelphia, of a machine that he asserted was motivated by a new and previously unknown force. Keely announced that he had discovered a principle for power production based on the musical vibrations of tuning forks and that music could resonate with atoms or with the aether. In the 19th century, luminiferous aether was the hypothesized substance that allowed light waves to propagate through the vacuum of outer space.

Public interest was aroused, and within a few months, the Keely Motor Company was formed in New York, with a capital of $5,000,000, equivalent to $95 million in 2013.

=== Keely's theories ===
Keely delivered descriptions of the supposed principles of his process on various occasions.

In 1884, following the demonstration of his "vaporic gun":

Stripping the process of all technical terms, it is simply this: I take water and air, two mediums of different specific gravity, and produces from them by generation an effect under vibrations that liberates from the air and water an inter atomic ether. The energy of this ether is boundless and can hardly be comprehended. The specific gravity of the ether is about four times lighter than that of hydrogen gas, the lightest gas so far discovered.

— The New York Times, September 22, 1884

Following a demonstration in June 1885:

It is an elaboration of interatomic ether by vibration. The atomic ether vibrates all around the molecules of matter. There is a magnetic force attached to it at the same time, and it assimilates with the molecular atomic aggregations — that is, assimilates with a certain attractive force that it is hard to tell what it is. I call it a vibratory negative. It don't act like a magnet drawing metals toward it. There is a certain magnetic effect about it that causes it to adhere by vibratory rotation to different forms of matter — that is the molecular, atomic, etheric, and ether-etheric. The impulse is given by metallic impulses, the rotary power that is formed by etheric vibration — that is the force that holds it in position.

— The New York Times, June 7, 1885

In the 19th century, most physicists believed that all space was filled with a medium called the "luminiferous aether" (or "ether"). This hypothetical substance was thought necessary for the transmission of electromagnetic waves and the propagation of light, which was believed to be impossible in "empty" space.

=== Etheric generator ===
On November 10, 1874, Keely demonstrated an "etheric generator" to a small group in Philadelphia. Keely blew into a nozzle for half a minute, then poured five gallons of tap water into the same nozzle. After some adjustments, a pressure gauge indicated pressures of 10,000 psi, which Keely said was evidence that the water had been disintegrated and a mysterious vapor had been liberated in the generator, capable of powering machinery. In subsequent demonstrations, he kept changing the terminology he used, from "vibratory-generator" to a "hydro-pneumatic-pulsating-vacu-engine" to "quadruple negative harmonics". It was later reported that the witnesses of the demonstration were so impressed that they formed a stock company, purchased patent rights for the six New England states, and paid $50,000 in cash for their share in the invention.

The New York Times reported in June 1875 that Keely's new motive power was generated from cold water and air and evolved into a vapor "more powerful than steam, and considerably more economical". It reported that Keely refused to disclose what the vapor was or how it was generated until he had taken out patents in "all the countries of the globe which issue patent rights", estimated to cost around $30,000.

Keely said that the discovery of this new energy source was accidental. He said that the apparatus by which it was generated was called a "generator" or "multiplicator", from where it was then passed into a "receiver" and from there to the cylinders of a steam engine. The "generator" was reported as being about 3 ft (0.91 m), made of Austrian gunmetal in one piece and holding about 10 or 12 gallons of water. Its inside consisted of cylindrical chambers connected by pipes and fitted with stopcocks and valves. The "receiver" or "reservoir" was about 40 in (1,000 mm) long by 6 in (150 mm) in diameter and connected to the "generator" by a 1 in (25 mm) diameter pipe. Keely claimed that his apparatus would generate his "vapor" from water solely by mechanical means without using any chemicals and claimed to be able to produce 2,000 psi in 5 seconds.

=== Clara Jessup Bloomfield Moore ===
In 1881, Keely met Clara Jessup Bloomfield Moore, the wealthy widow of a Philadelphia industrialist who had established the Bloomfield Moore art collection the year before. Mrs Moore became acquainted with Keely through her interest in scientific subjects and remained his friend and patron until his death. She invested $100,000 plus a monthly salary of $250 (around $2.2 million and $5400/month in today's values ) so that he could focus completely on the perfection of his motor and widely advocated him and his work, producing many articles and books.

Her family disapproved of her assuming obligations, which they believed the company should fulfill under its contract with Keely. She arranged with Keely in 1890 to furnish him with an additional $2000 per month for his household and shop expenses and instruments, which was to expire when he had gained sufficient control of his unknown force to enable him to resume his work under the direction of the management of the company upon a provisional engine. This arrived in December 1890, when Mrs Bloomfield Moore handed over to the Directors bills that had been presented since the expiration of Mr. Keely's contract with her.

=== Stockholder suit ===
On December 14, 1881, the stockholders of the Keely Motor Company held a meeting at which a report was read that complained that while they had faith in the merits of Keely's invention, the inventor was unreasonably secretive of the principles and operating methods of his apparatus. He had assured them that the "generator" had been perfected a year before and that the "multiplicator" was also now perfected, and they considered it only fair and reasonable that the secrets of the machinery be revealed to them. They recommended that some intelligent and trustworthy person be taken into Keely's confidence "so that in the case of accident they would not be totally without a clue to the invention". The report complained at some length about Keely's uncommunicativeness and said that it was the experience of everyone who had come into contact with him over the previous ten years that "any attempt at a serious investigation of his operations has been met on his part with deception and misrepresentation".

Keely was reluctant to reveal his secrets and filed a demurrer on January 20, 1882, to the bill in equity presented against him by the Keely Motor Company's stockholders. The demurrer was described as entirely technical and gave several reasons why the court should not afford the plaintiffs the relief they sought. Argument was heard on the demurrer in Philadelphia's Court of Common Pleas on March 27, when it was argued that the inventor "could not be made to expose that which no one knew but himself and which was hidden in his own brain". However, Judge Pierce overruled Keely on April 1, 1882, ordering him to "make known his process in the way indicated in the bill filed by the Keely Motor Company".

On May 24, Keely filed his answer to the stockholders' equity suit. He admitted the truth of the complainants' bill regarding the contract. He added that although he had failed to bring his inventions into practical use due to "certain abstruse difficulties because of the nature and qualities of the said force", he believed he would ultimately succeed.

In June 1882, a committee appointed by the company's board of directors agreed that one William Boekel of Philadelphia was to be "instructed by Mr. Keely in the construction and operation of his inventions".

The annual meeting of the company's stockholders on December 13, 1882, heard a report from Boekel in which he stated that what Keely claimed to have discovered was "the fact that water in its natural state is capable of being, by vibratory motion, disintegrated so that its molecular structure is broken up, and there is evolved therefrom a permanent expansive gas or ether, which result is produced by mechanical action". Boekel said it would be improper to describe the mechanism used, adding that Keely had discovered all that he had claimed. It was later discovered by a Times reporter in August that Boekel had not yet been entrusted with the secrets of the motor as promised by Keely, and that the inventor kept delaying matters by telling Boekel that he could explain it to him in less than two hours after it was completed and that he had not done so already because the engine had not yet reached that state.

On August 28, 1883, at the monthly meeting of the company's directors, it was announced that Keely's engine would be ready for operation around the first week in September and that a final inspection of it by the Trustees would be conducted on August 29, at which the stockholders were expected to be present. However, when the inspection was made the following day, Keely said that it would not be ready for another six weeks.

On October 29, 1883, it was reported that the company's stockholders were to bring another suit against the inventor in the name of the company for "fulfilment of his many pledges". At a meeting of the Board of Directors the following day, Keely made a statement explaining his progress, saying that he was constructing a street chamber to hold his vapor and that when this was complete a demonstration would be given, and his explanation was voted "very satisfactory" by the directors.

At the annual stockholders' meeting on December 12, 1883, a letter from Keely was read out, in which the inventor said that he could not see why he might not fulfill the shareholders' expectations in the next two months and suggested that the stockholders' meeting be postponed to February 1, 1884. This proposal met with some disagreement from some stockholders, and it was decided to give Keely no funds for the next 60 days. When the promised stockholders' meeting was held on February 1, 1884, another postponement was announced at Keely's request. A board meeting which took place on March 25, 1884, reported that the vibratory engine was finished, that "the work of adjusting and focalizing is progressing rapidly", and that Keely had set a date for the demonstration of the motor to take place on or before April 10.

=== Vaporic gun ===
On September 20, 1884, Keely demonstrated a "vaporic gun" at Sandy Hook to a party of Government officials. He said that he had brought with him five gallons of "vaporic force" in a "receiver", which, if the experiments were successful, would show that no bogus aids had been used. The gun was described as a small gun with a 1.25 in (32 mm) bore, resting on wheels, with an iron "receiver" 4.5 ft (1.4 m) long containing Keely's mysterious force connected to it by "an iron wire tube" 3/16 in (4.8 mm) in diameter. Keely rammed a small lead ball about 5 oz (140 g) in weight into the gun's muzzle, then tapped the iron "receiver" with a hammer. He explained that this was to stimulate the "vibratory force". He then turned a handle, and the ball was fired from the gun with a short, sharp report but no smoke and minimal recoil. It was reported that the projectile had been fired at a distance of 300 yd (270 m). More shots were fired and their velocity measured; one attained 482 ft/s (147 m/s), another 492 ft/s (150 m/s), and yet another 523 ft/s (159 m/s). The gun was also tested by firing against three 3 in (76 mm) thick spruce planks and penetrated the first and went halfway through the second. Keely said that he had used a pressure of 7,000 psi and could use 30,000 psi.

The following day, Keely met with a reporter, who declared that his experimenting days were over and that complete success was close. He announced that his motor would be completed in less than two months and that he would then make a public exhibition of its powers.

The vaporic gun failed to impress Lieutenant E.L. Zalinski, who had witnessed the demonstration. An accomplished military engineer who was in the process of developing a pneumatic dynamite gun for the U.S. Army, Zalinski was familiar with the properties of compressed air and well aware of its ballistic potential. To Zalinski, Keely's "vaporic gun" bore a suspicious resemblance to experiments he had previously conducted for the army, using compressed air to lob explosive shells at high velocities and across great distances. In any case, the use of compressed air to fire projectiles in such a manner was nothing new at that time, the first air rifles having been invented as early as the 16th century. Zalinski told the president of the Keely Motor Company, A.R. Edey, that with the same apparatus, he could perform the same experiments with compressed air and go even further than Keely had gone. Edey said he would "speak about it to Mr. Keely," but the offer was not accepted. Zalinski said that none of the experiments at Sandy Hook showed that Keely had discovered a new force.

Zalinski later attended a November demonstration at Keely's workshop in place of Colonel John Hamilton. He later reported that he suggested to Keely that it would be a complete test of his power if he discharged a large reservoir, which he showed his guests, and then recharged it using his generator. Keely declined to do this because it would take two hours - despite his many statements that he could generate force in a few seconds - and that the reservoir had been "carefully negatized". Keely also claimed to have achieved pressures of 50,000 psi and had broken all his pressure gauges. When Zalinski produced a pressure gauge he had brought with him - capable of registering 10,000 psi - and offered it to Keely, saying, "I would like to have you put it on, and break it for me", Keely was momentarily lost for words before saying, "I do not believe in pressure gauges, anyhow."

=== June 1885 demonstration ===
On June 6, 1885, Keely gave what he called "an exhibition" of his motor at his workshop at North Twentieth Street, Philadelphia. Around 20 witnesses attended, including newspaper reporters, a mechanical engineer, and officers and stockholders of the Keely Motor Company. A reporter noticed a "large iron globular object", which he was told was a new engine that Keely was engaged in building.

Keely assembled an apparatus on top of which was screwed a globe with several apertures to which tubes were fixed, leading to cylinders. A reporter asked if he could see the globe's contents, but Keely declined, saying that it would take too long and that he wished to show results rather than the mechanism. Keely then rubbed a violin bow across one of two large tuning forks that formed part of his apparatus. After making a minor adjustment to the device, he opened a stopcock leading into one of the cylinders and the witnesses heard "a hiss as of escaping air". Keely told them that it was, in fact, "etheric vapor", adding, "It ain't compressed air or any vapor having substance." The force was then used to lift some weights, and Keely claimed that he had about 22,000 psi of pressure at his disposal.

A further demonstration was given of a rotating iron globe suspended on an axle, which was used to saw some wood. The globe was not opened, Keely saying that it was hollow and empty, and his assistants saying it contained "some bits of mechanism". A skeptical reporter, who believed it was operating on compressed air, asked how long the engine could work. Keely replied that he had one run for 40 days, whereupon the reporter suggested he run it for half an hour, just making the globe rotate. Keely duly set the globe rotating, which ran for less than 15 minutes, constantly decreasing in power, before stopping it.

On March 26, 1886, Keely performed a demonstration before a committee of scientists and engineers from New York, where he obtained a pressure of 2,700 psi apparently by using a single pint of water and then doubled the pressure by adding more water. Keely claimed that the "etheric force" by which these results were obtained would be utilized as fully as possible in the 25,000 hp engine he was working on.

The stockholders of the Keely Motor Company met on December 14, 1887, and expressed their confidence in Keely's ultimate success. Keely did not attend the meeting but supplied a report in which he reviewed his efforts and experiments since 1882 and announced that he had abandoned "etheric force" in favor of a new force which was unnamed but which he said was based on "vibratory sympathy".

=== Wilson suit ===
On January 3, 1888, an injunction was granted against Keely on behalf of complainant Bennett C. Wilson, who said that in 1863, he had agreed with Keely, whom he had originally engaged to varnish furniture. The agreement was that Wilson was to find tools and materials and pay the expenses of inventions made by Keely; Keely agreed that he and Wilson should equally own all inventions made and patents obtained. On August 14, 1869, Keely assigned half ownership in what was referred to as the "Keely motor" to Wilson, who claimed that Keely had assigned all rights and title to the invention later that same month in return for funds.

Wilson alleged that he had only recently become aware that the "Keely motor" machine was the same as the one constructed in 1869 and assigned to him. He asked for an injunction restraining Keely from removing the machine or altering its construction or mode of operation. He requested that an order also be made compelling Keely to exhibit to the complainant all models, machines, and drawings of the invention referred to in the assignments to Wilson and that an order be made compelling Keely to fully disclose the invention and the mode of constructing and operating it.

On April 7, a formal order was made directing Bennett Wilson, his attorney, and four experts to fully inspect the Keely motor, its mode of construction, and principle of operation within 30 days. The four experts were named Dr. Charles M. Cresson, Analytical Chemist of City and State Boards of Health; Thomas Shaw, mechanical engineer; William D. Marks, civil engineer and Professor of Dynamical Engineering at the University of Pennsylvania; and Jacob Naylor, iron founder and President of the Eighth National Bank. The result of the inspection was to make known only whether the present Keely motor was or was not the same apparatus that he was alleged to have assigned to Wilson in 1869.

On September 18, it was revealed that Keely had not obeyed the court order, despite the period having been increased to 60 days, and a lawyer representing Bennett Wilson said he believed Keely never would comply with the order and that he had never intended to do so. Finally, on November 17, 1888, Keely was jailed in Moyamensing Prison for contempt of court for refusing the court order to "operate and explain the mode of operation" of the Keely Motor. However, he was soon released on bail on November 20 by three judges of the Supreme Court of Pennsylvania.

Finally, on January 28, 1889, the Supreme Court of Pennsylvania handed down an opinion reversing the order committing Keely to prison for contempt and ordered his discharge. The opinion declared that the order commanding Keely to "exhibit, explain, and operate his motor" was premature and that the court had no right to enforce the order by committing Keely to jail for contempt.

On March 28, 1889, Keely's counsel announced that the inventor had the "missing link" to make the "vibratory resonator and ethereal generative evaporator" successful. It was described as a copper tube in the form of a loop, with the ends welded together so that no joint could be seen, and had been made in copper due to that metal's "resonant properties". A private demonstration of Keely's motor was promised as soon as the tube was "adjusted", and was stated as likely to occur "in a week or two".

At the Keely Motor Company's stockholders' meeting in December, a report was read from Keely in which he discussed the difficulties he had had with the Board of Directors during 1889 and said that while the work of "graduating" or adjusting his provisional engine had not progressed as rapidly as he had expected, no serious obstacles had presented themselves. No difficulties affected the principle or "essence" of his work. While he could not give a timescale for when the graduation of the engine would be completed, Keely said that it would not be a protracted period and that when it was finished, one or more engines would at once be ordered.

In June 1895, the trade journal Electricity published a challenge to Keely, saying that it would undertake to repeat every phenomenon produced by Keely within 60 days. Keely ignored this challenge.

After an absence of several years in England, Mrs. Moore returned to the US to deal with litigation concerning her late husband's estate. Her advocacy of Keely and his inventions formed part of the case, and she decided to strengthen her position by getting eminent physicists to examine his inventions. Among those invited were Thomas Edison and Nikola Tesla, who declined the opportunity for various reasons.

Keely again informed the directors of his company in early November 1895 that "before the end of the year", he would "positively be all through with his work to prove that" he has devised "a practical commercial working engine" operated by his new force.

On November 14, it was reported that another meeting had been arranged between Keely and Mrs. Bloomfield Moore and New York capitalists headed by John Jacob Astor IV, who were interested in the Keely Motor Company. It was reported the following week that Astor had purchased a significant interest in the motor from "a person who for some years past has been an enthusiastic advocate of M. Keely".

Also, in November 1895, Mrs. Moore invited Addison B. Burk, president of the Spring Garden Institute, to make an inspection. Burk asked if electrical engineer E. Alexander Scott, of the Engineers' Club of Philadelphia, could accompany him, which was agreed to. In the event, Scott took charge of the investigation as he was familiar with Keely and had talked to him in 1874.

Scott made several visits to Keely's workshop, beginning on November 9, 1895, and was shown many demonstrations. Among these was a levitation experiment where heavy weights in sealed flasks of water were made to rise and fall in response to differently pitched sounds from a zither to activate a "globe liberator", which then transmitted "the aetheric force" through a wire to the water container. This was shown to many investors and investigators. Burk accompanied Scott on his second and third visits. When the two analyzed what they had seen, they concluded that compressed air had been used in nearly all the experiments, in some cases alongside another more powerful but hidden force. The demonstration with the rising and falling weights was powered by compressed air via a thin tube, which Keely had assured Burk and Scott was a solid wire and which was a common feature in nearly every piece of apparatus in Keely's laboratory.

Burk and Scott reported their findings to Mrs. Moore, who was concerned about the negative report and dismissive articles in the press. On March 22, 1896, it was reported that Mrs. Bloomfield Moore had arranged with Professor Wentworth Lascelles Scott of London to investigate Keely's claims of etheric force and examine his other inventions. It was said that "an important series of tests will be made in the presence of the scientist". Lascelles Scott was allowed to examine whatever he wanted and had complete instructions on its use from Keely. After spending a month investigating, Lascelles Scott stated to a meeting of the Franklin Institute that "Keely has demonstrated to me, in a way which is absolutely unquestionable, the existence of a force hitherto unknown."

Since Lascelles Scott and Alexander Scott disagreed, Keely brought them together to witness more demonstrations. Mrs. Moore suggested that a definitive test would be to cut the wire that Scott alleged was, in fact, an air pipe, but Keely flatly refused to do so, and Mrs. Moore, her faith shaken, reduced Keely's monthly salary.

On December 24, 1895, Mrs. Bloomfield Moore said that due to the position taken by the managers of the old Keely Motor Company at the annual meeting and the delay on the part of the stockholders in accepting his proposition for a reorganization, Keely had decided not to take out any patents on his inventions, and would instead adopt a royalty system in dealing with his inventions commercially. Mrs. Moore said that at least 30 patents would be required, which would take much time and money to be better used in developing Keely's system.

On June 18, 1897, Keely demonstrated his new etheric engine to the Manhattan Elevated Railway General Manager, the Chief Engineer of Western Union, and a representative of the Metropolitan Traction Company. All were reported as being surprised at the force produced by Keely's new motor but declined to express any opinion as to its value. The engine was reported as weighing about 200 lb (91 kg) and capable of developing 10 hp.

== Death ==
Keely died at his home in Philadelphia from pneumonia on November 18, 1898. He was interred in West Laurel Hill Cemetery in Bala Cynwyd, Pennsylvania. His will was admitted to probate on December 1, and bequeathed his entire estate of about $10,000 to his widow, Anna M. Keely, who was appointed his executor. The will did not refer to his motor.

The first meeting of the Keely Motor Company's stockholders following his death was held on December 20, 1898. Charles S. Hill, his widow's attorney, stated that Keely's secret did not exist in manuscript form but that Keely had suggested before his death that an inventor, Thomas Burton Kinraide of Boston, was the one man who could successfully carry on his work. Hill then announced that he had a secret that he would pass on to only one person. This secret, he said, was "of a nature to encourage the stockholders and to induce them to leave everything in Kinraide's hands for one year". John J. Smith, one of the company's Directors, was appointed to confer with Hill and later reported that the secret said to him by Hill "offered great encouragement to the stockholders" but did not divulge any further details.

In January 1899, Kinraide had 20 large packing cases transported to his laboratory in Jamaica Plain, Boston, which was said to contain the material part of Keely's motor. Kinraide said that he had often talked with Keely about his invention's principles and that he felt he knew more about it than any other person. He was to continue with Keely's experiments at the request of Mr. and Mrs Keely. However, on May 6, 1899, it was reported that Kinraide had abandoned all work on the Keely motor and was to return all the machines and notes to the Keely Company. He stated that he wanted nothing more to do with the motor due to the notoriety caused him by the Philadelphia Press report. When asked whether he thought the motor was a fraud, he simply replied that he had not arrived at any such conclusion and had decided to make no further investigations.

=== Philadelphia Press investigation ===
On January 19, 1899, The Philadelphia Press published an illustrated article detailing an investigation made by the newspaper of Keely's workshop, in which the Press contended that the investigation had proven Keely's motor to have been "a delusion and deception" and that its alleged mysterious forces were the result of trickery.

The investigation, which took a week, was assisted by consulting engineer Professor Carl Hering, Assistant Professor of Physics at the University of Pennsylvania Professor Arthur W. Goodspeed, Professor of Experimental Psychology at the University of Pennsylvania Lightner Witmer, and Doctor M. G. Miller, who superintended digging operations. Electrical engineer Clarence B. Moore, the son of Mrs. Bloomfield Moore, was an observer. The scientists involved substantiated the report with signed statements.

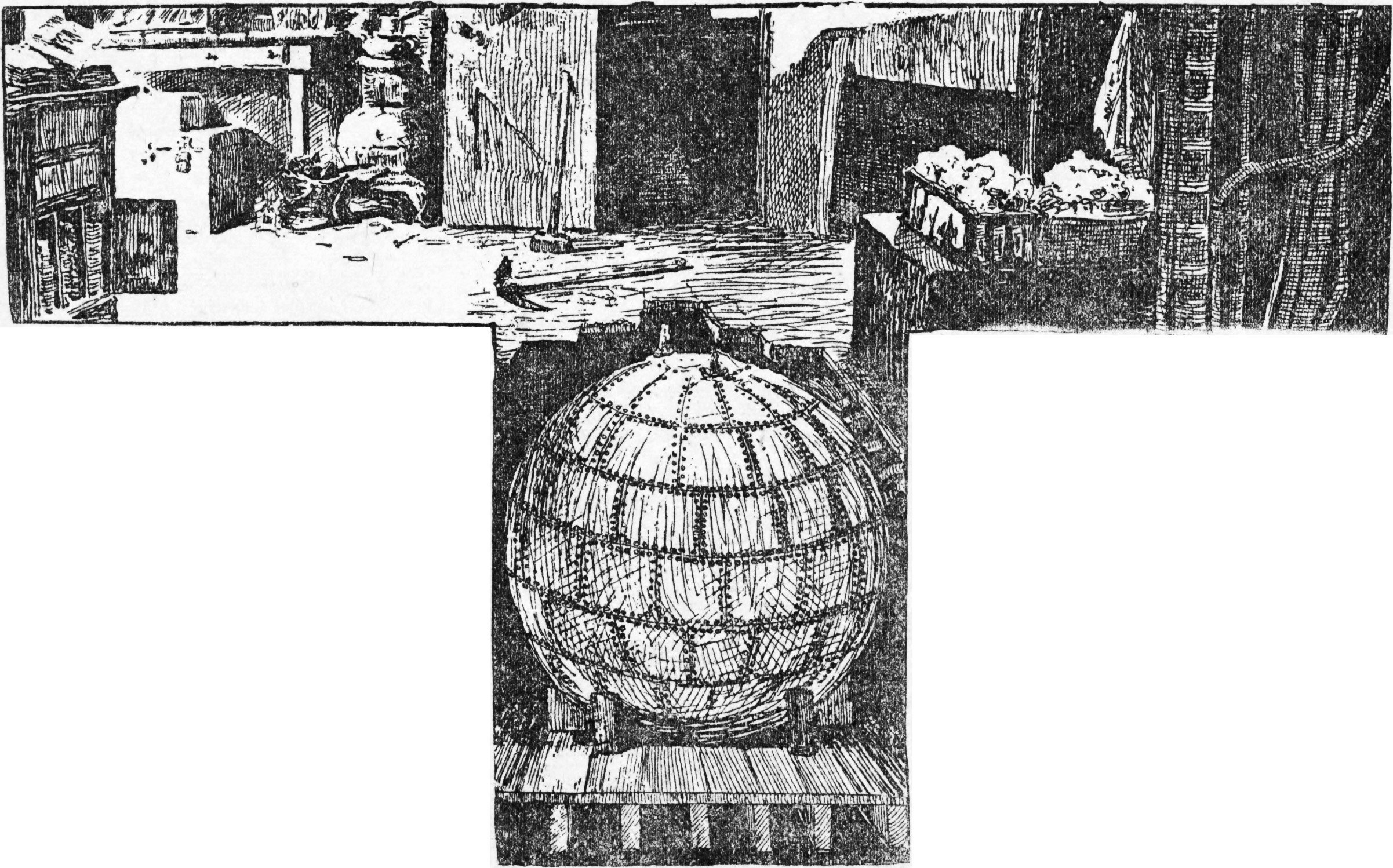
Sphere under the laboratory

The floors of Keely's workshop were taken up, and a brick wall was removed. Inside the wall, they found mechanical belts linked to a silent water motor two floors below the laboratory. In the basement, a three-ton sphere of compressed air ran the machines through hidden high-pressure tubes and switches. The walls, ceilings, and even solid beams were found to have concealed tubes. Journalists documented everything photographically to leave no room for doubt. Hering and Goodspeed thought that the tubing and the large steel sphere in the basement indicated the use of regular forces and possible deception, and Hering said in his signed statement that Keely had probably lied and deceived and was satisfied that he had used highly compressed air to power his demonstrations.

At a meeting of the Keely Motor Company's board on January 25, 1899, President B. L. Ackerman issued a statement denying the Philadelphia Press report. The statement claimed that the tubes mentioned in the report had been discarded by Keely years before and that in all his experiments since 1887, only solid wires had been used. Up to that time, it was stated that Keely had been working on a theory of etheric or vaporic force and used the tubes to convey this force, but after 1887, he was convinced that he had discovered what he called "vibratory sympathy". Ackerman described a concealed electric wire discovered in Keely's workshop as the remains of the wires of a burglar alarm that were in no way connected with the force used by Keely's motor. The statement denied all assertions that Keely was an imposter and declared that there was no trickery in any of the results that Keely had claimed to have obtained.

== Present day ==
A model of Keely's engine was in the collection of the Franklin Institute in Philadelphia, and an "Etheric Force Machine" of his dating from 1878 is in the American Precision Museum in Windsor, Vermont.

In 2005, Jeff and Rita Behary found the original glass plate negatives of the Keely Motor taken by Thomas Burton Kinraide in his Jamaica Plain home, Ravenscroft. They show the contents of the Keely Motor and are the last known photos of the motor ever taken.
