= Clara Jessup Moore =

American poet

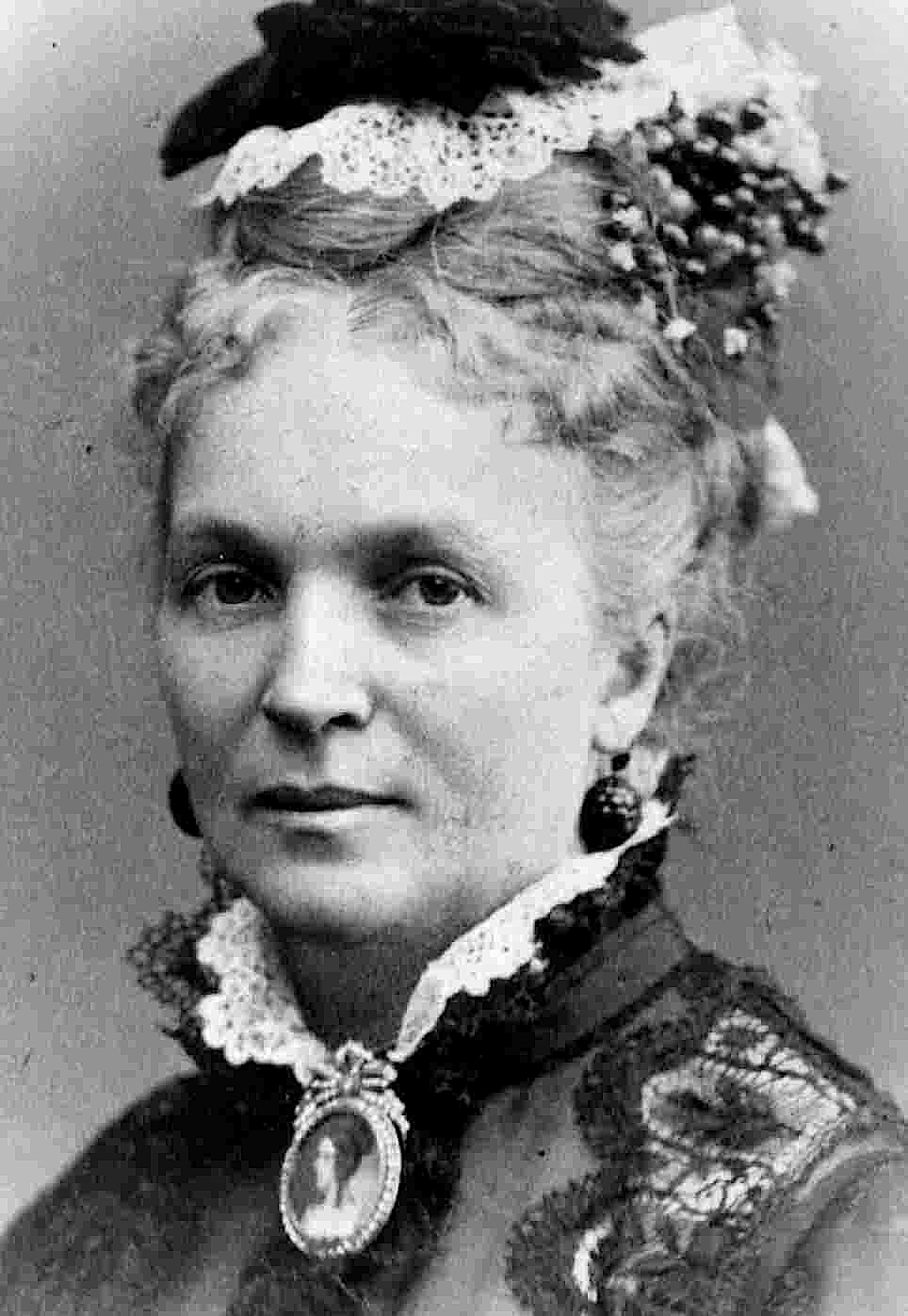
- Born: Clara Sophia Jessup; February 16, 1824; Westfield, Massachusetts
- Died: January 5, 1899 (aged 74); London
- Spouse: Bloomfield Haines Moore

Clara Sophia Jessup Bloomfield-Moore (February 16, 1824 – January 5, 1899) was an American philanthropist and philosopher.

== Biography ==
She was born in Westfield, Massachusetts to Augustus Edward Jessop (a chemist) and Lydia Eager Mosley Jessup, and attended Westfield Academy and at Mrs. Merrick's School in New Haven, Connecticut.

She married businessman Bloomfield Haines Moore (1819-1878) and resided in Philadelphia during her marriage. Following the death of her husband she moved to London, where she died in 1899. She organized in Philadelphia a hospital relief committee during the American Civil War and assisted in the foundation of the Temperance Home for Children.

She and her husband had three children: Ella Carlton Moore (1843–1892), Clarence Bloomfield Moore (1852–1936), Lilian Stuart Moore (1853–1911). They were the grandparents of Swedish explorer and ethnographer Eric von Rosen.

== Philanthropy ==
Among her philanthropic efforts Moore made additional provision to the Jessup Fund established in 1860 by the bequest of her father Augustus E. Jessup. This fund was originally for the purpose of compensating young men to work directly with curatorial staff at the Academy of Natural Sciences of Philadelphia. Moore added to the fund to ensure women were offered the same opportunity.

Moore was also a collector of art objects, including oil paintings, jewelry, porcelains, textiles, pottery, glass, and carved ivories; she bequeathed her collection to the Philadelphia Museum of Art.

== Philosophy ==
Her books on etiquette connected the perennial philosophy to social behavior. She described harmony as the basis of good manners: "the secret or essence of good manners, as of goodness in all other things, consists in suitableness, or in other words of harmony." She promoted a "science of social intercourse" consisting of "the means through which people meet each other, maintaining harmony and peace in their relations, and securing the greatest possible amount of pleasure and comfort to all."

This philosophy was subsequently applied to physics. Her book on ether was written because she believed that ether could account for the operation of the motor invented by John Ernst Worrell Keely, to whose Keely Motor Company she gave liberally in order that he might develop his idea. An article by her, "Keely's Contribution to Science", was published in Lippencott's Monthly Magazine of July 1890, the same issue that first published Oscar Wilde's The Picture of Dorian Gray.

== Selected works ==
Moore's published works included;

- The Young Jewess and Her Christian Schoolfellows (1847)
- Miscellaneous Poems (1875)
- On Dangerous Ground (1876), a romance
- Sensible Etiquette (1878)
- Gondaline's lesson: The warden's tale: Stories for children and other poems (1881)
- Ether the True Protoplasm (1885)
- Social Ethics and Social Duties (1892)
- Keely and His Discoveries (1893)

She also wrote under the pen-names of Clara Moreton and Harriet Oxnard Ward.
