= Carin Göring =

Swedish first wife of Hermann Göring (1888–1931)

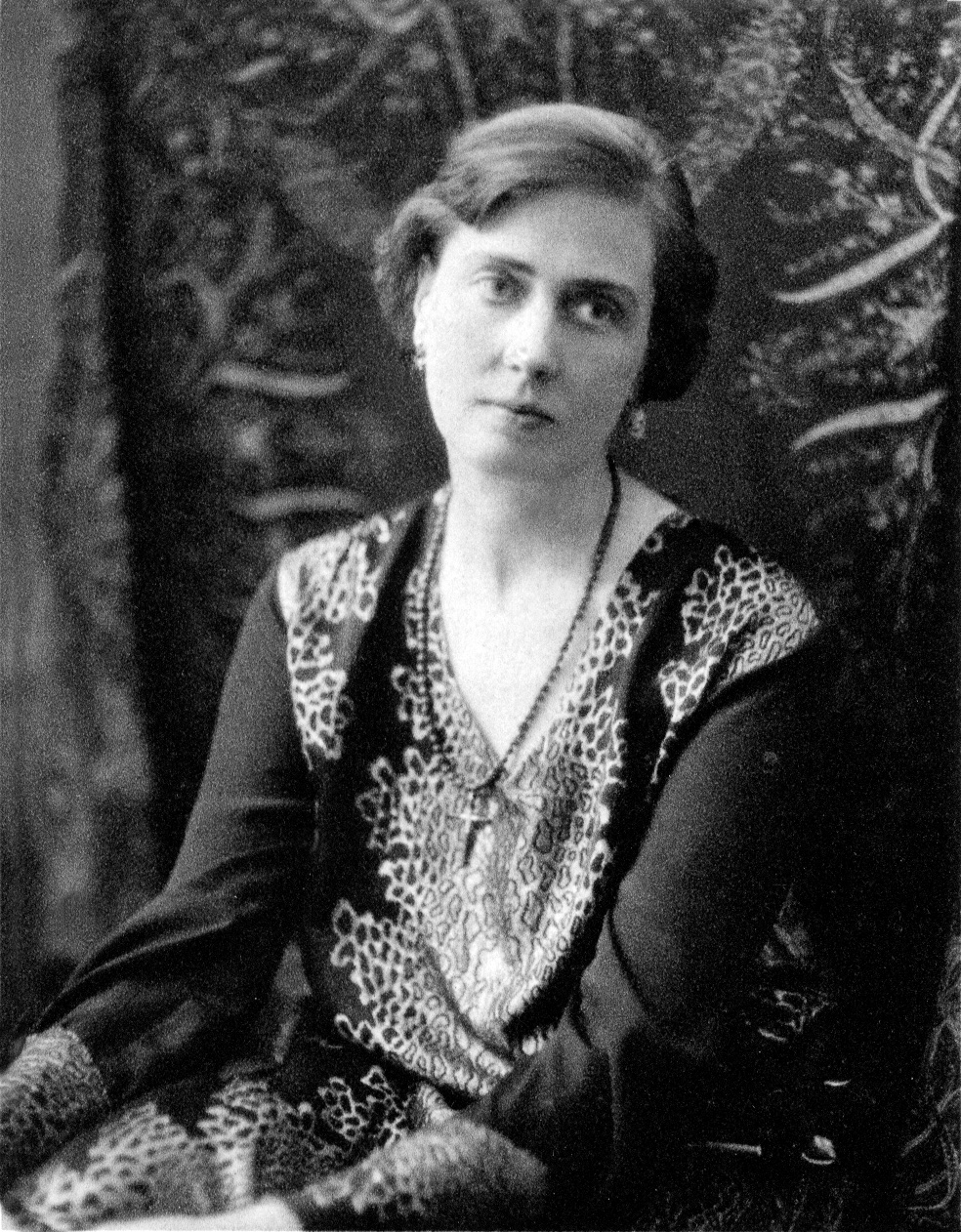
- Carin Göring in 1927
- Born: Carin Axelina Hulda Fock; 21 October 1888; Stockholm, Sweden
- Died: 17 October 1931 (aged 42); Stockholm, Sweden
- Resting place: Lovö Kyrka, Lovön, Sweden; 59°19′16.71″N 17°50′23.28″E
- Other name: Countess Carin von Kantzow
- Spouses: Nils von Kantzow (m. 1910; div. 1922) Hermann Göring (m. 1923)
- Children: Thomas von Kantzow
- Relatives: Mary von Rosen (sister); Birgitta Wolf (niece)

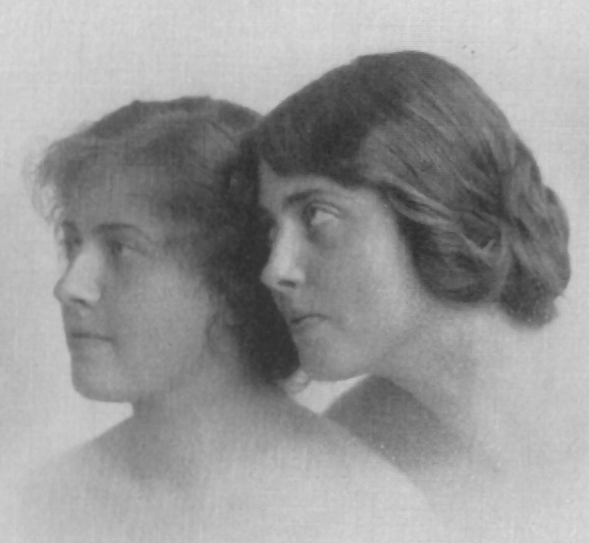
Lily and Carin Fock (sisters)

Carin Axelina Hulda Göring (née Fock; formerly Countess von Kantzow; 21 October 1888 – 17 October 1931) was the Swedish first wife of Hermann Göring.

== Early life ==
She was born in Stockholm in 1888. Her father, Baron Carl Alexander Fock, was a Swedish Army colonel. The Fock family were of Baltic-German origin, which had emigrated from Westphalia to the Duchy of Estonia, then part of Sweden, in the 17th century, and matriculated into the Swedish nobility. Her paternal great-grandfather was the Swedish zoologist Bengt Fredrik Fries. Her mother, whose name was Huldine Beamish, was born in 1860 into an Anglo-Irish family famous for brewing Beamish and Crawford stout in Cork. Her great-great-grandfather, William Beamish, was one of the founders of Beamish and Crawford, and her grandfather had served in Britain's Coldstream Guards. Carin's maternal grandmother, Hulda Elisabet Consantia Mosander, who was of Swedish origin, daughter of professor of chemistry Carl Gustaf Mosander, had founded a private religious sisterhood, the Edelweiss Society.

In 1910, she married Swedish Olympic gymnast and Army officer Nils von Kantzow. Their only child, Thomas von Kantzow, was born in 1912.

== Relationship with Göring ==
In 1920, while she was estranged from her first husband, Carin met Hermann Göring at Rockelstad Castle while she was visiting her sister Mary. Four years younger than she, he was working in Sweden as a commercial pilot for the short-lived airline Svensk Lufttrafik and was at the castle because he had flown Count Eric von Rosen, her sister Mary's husband, there. Göring fell in love with Carin and soon started meeting her in Stockholm, even though, scandalous at the time, she was a separated married woman with a young child. Following her finalized divorce from von Kantzow on 13 December 1922, she married Göring in Stockholm on 25 January 1923.

After their marriage, their first home together was a hunting lodge at Hochkreuth in the Bavarian Alps, near Bayrischzell, some 80 kilometres (50 mi) from Munich. After Göring met Adolf Hitler and joined the Nazi Party in 1922, they moved to Obermenzing, a suburb of Munich. Carin followed her husband and became a member of the Nazi Party. When Göring was badly injured in the groin while marching alongside Hitler in the failed Beer Hall Putsch in November 1923, Carin took him to Austria, then on to Italy, and nursed him back to health. Carin and Göring's romantic love-story was used by the propaganda machine of Joseph Goebbels, and the couple toured around the nation to boost the popularity of the Nazi Party.

Carin suffered from tuberculosis by her early forties. When her mother, Huldine Fock, died unexpectedly on 25 September 1931, it came as a great shock to the 42-year-old Carin. Although her health was still fragile, she went to Sweden for her mother's funeral. The next day, she suffered a heart attack in Stockholm. On the news reaching Göring, he joined her there and stayed with her until she died of heart failure on 17 October 1931, four days before her 43rd birthday.

After her death, Carin's older sister Eleanor Fanny Gräfin von Wilamowitz-Mollendorff wrote a biography of her which quickly became a bestseller in Germany. By 1943, it had sold 900,000 copies.

Carin's death came as a great blow to Göring. In 1933 he began to build a hunting lodge, which became his main home, and named it Carinhall in her honour. It was there that he had her body re-interred from her original grave in Sweden, in a funeral attended by Adolf Hitler and Heinrich Himmler. Göring filled Carinhall with images of Carin, as he did his flat in Berlin, where he created an altar in memory of her which remained even after he remarried in 1935. Carinhall was demolished on Göring's orders as Soviet troops advanced in 1945.

After World War II, remains believed to be those of Carin were recovered by the Fock family, cremated, and re-buried in Sweden. In 1991, remains were found in a zinc coffin that was inside a tin coffin. DNA from the bones was extracted and it was found that the mtDNA sequences matched well with that of Carin's son. The researchers at Uppsala University found enough evidence suggesting that the new remains were hers, which were reburied.

== Sources ==
- Manvell, Roger; Fraenkel, Heinrich (2011) [1962]. Goering: The Rise and Fall of the Notorious Nazi Leader. London: Skyhorse. ISBN 978-1-61608-109-6.
