= Rockelstad Castle =

Castle in Sweden

Coordinates: 59°02′22″N 16°51′25″E

- Rockelstad slott
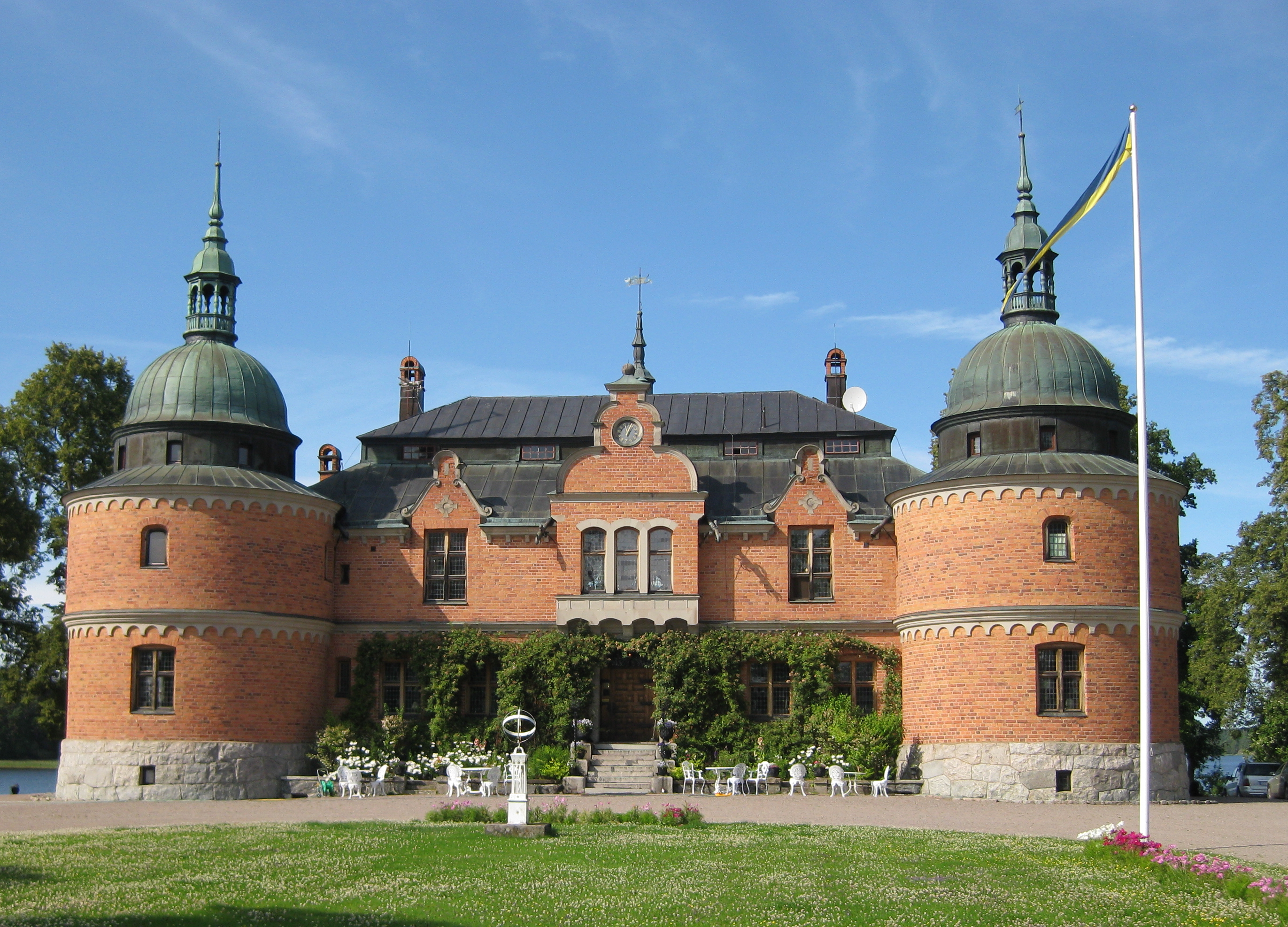
- Interactive map of the Rockelstad Castle area

General information
- Location: Flen Municipality, Sweden

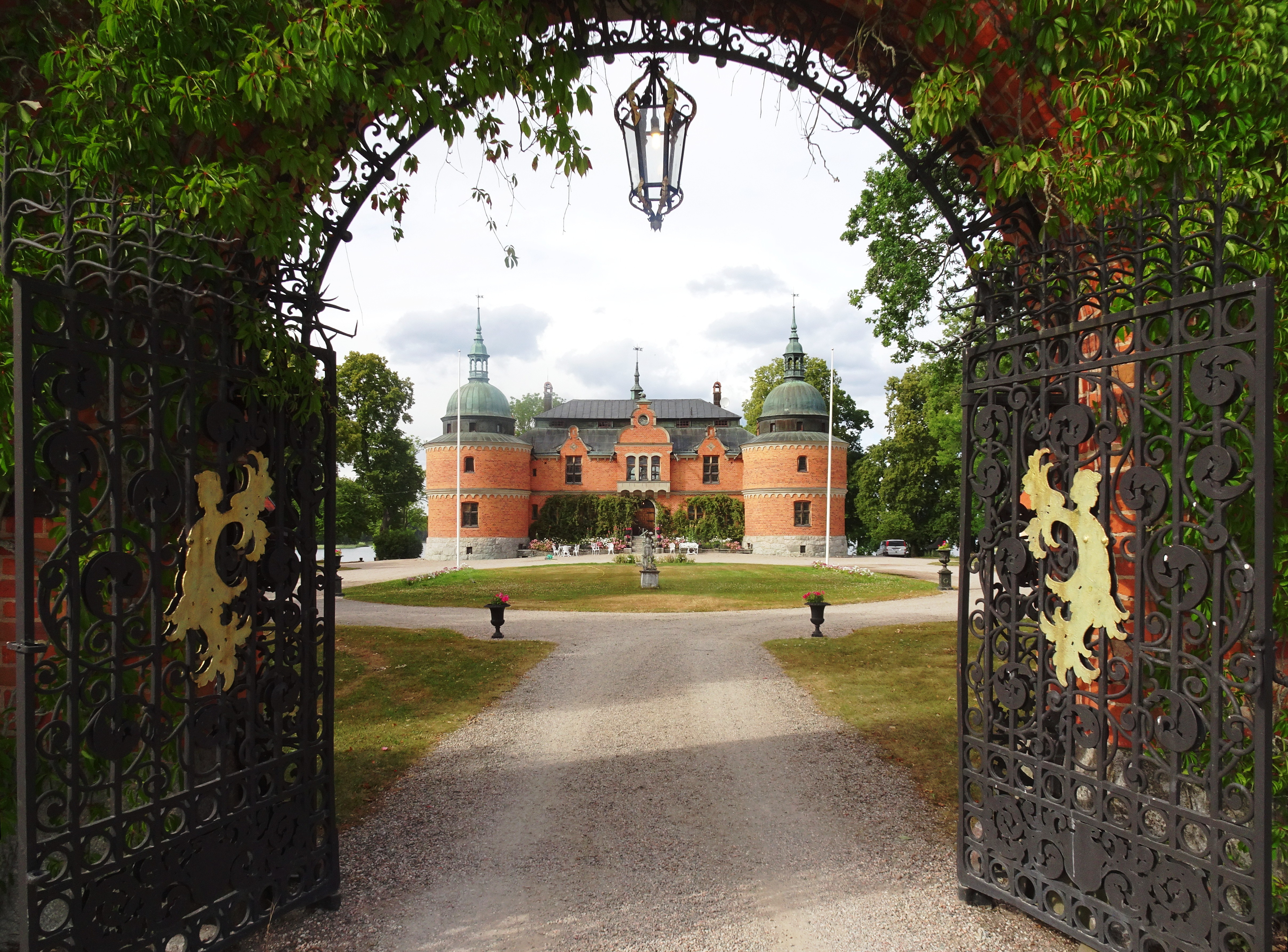
Rockelstad Castle Gate

Rockelstad Castle (Swedish: Rockelstad slott) is a neo-renaissance manor house in the municipality of Flen in Södermanland, Sweden. Rockelstad, together with Sparreholm and Vibyholm, are all estates situated on Lake Båven.

== History ==
The old main building, dating from the 17th century, was rebuilt by Karl Sylvan in 1889 under the direction of architect Gustaf Lindgren (1863–1930). The main building, flanked by two round and two square towers, got its current appearance under Eric von Rosen (1879–1948) who owned the estate from 1900. The architect for the renovation was Ivar Tengbom (1878–1968). The large entrance hall at Rockelstad was completed in 1903. In the 1930s, the northern towers were rebuilt.

== See also ==
- List of castles in Sweden
