= List of Sweden national football team managers =

This is a complete list of Sweden men's national football team managers, football managers who have coached the Sweden men's national football team and a list of the chairmen of the Swedish Football Association International Selection Committee from 1908 to 1961 which acted as national team managers. They are listed in chronological order, their total national team scores and any qualifications to the finals of the World Cup, European Championship or Olympic Games are included. A game lost after a penalty shoot-out is counted as a draw, but a game lost after extra time is counted as a loss.

== List of national team managers ==
Updated 17 November 2026

Manager	Tenure	M	W	D	L	GF	GA	World Cups	Euros
Lennart Nyman	1962–1965	36	14	13	9	60	44	–	–
Orvar Bergmark	1966–1970	49	26	11	12	87	59	1970	–
Georg Ericson	1971–1979	91	39	20	32	130	109	1974, 1978	–
Lars Arnesson	1980–1985	59	27	13	19	93	60	–	–
Olle Nordin	1986–1990	45	23	12	10	71	40	1990	–
Nisse Andersson (caretaker)	1990	4	2	0	2	5	5	–	–
Tommy Svensson	1991–1997	87	44	23	20	147	88	1994	1992
Tommy Söderberg	1998–1999	20	12	4	4	18	10	–	–
T. Söderberg / L. Lagerbäck	2000–2004	68	28	25	15	113	61	2002	2000, 2004
Lars Lagerbäck	2004–2009	73	31	19	23	104	72	2006	2008
Erik Hamrén	2009–2016	86	46	17	23	147	87	–	2012, 2016
Janne Andersson	2016–2023	94	48	15	31	151	97	2018	2020
Daniel Bäckström (caretaker)	2024	1	1	0	0	2	1	–	–
Jon Dahl Tomasson	2024–2025	18	9	2	7	36	26	–	–
Graham Potter	2025–	16	7	5	4	29	29	2026	–

== List of chairmen of the Swedish Football Association International Selection Committee ==
Name	Tenure	M	W	D	L	GF	GA	World Cups	Olympic Games
Ludvig Kornerup	1908	6	1	0	5	17	30		1908
Wilhelm Friberg	1909–1911	6	4	0	2	18	15		–
John Ohlson	1912	5	2	1	2	14	9		1912
Ruben Gelbord	1912–1913	7	3	1	3	18	24		–
Hugo Levin	1914–1915	10	4	3	3	22	18		–
Frey Svenson	1916	5	2	1	2	12	5		–
Anton Johanson	1917–1920	25	8	4	13	48	43		1920
John Pettersson	1921–1936	138	73	21	44	399	252	1934	1924, 1936
Carl Linde	1937	8	2	1	5	17	21	–	–
Gustaf Carlsson	1938–1942	24	13	4	7	70	44	1938	–
Selection Committee	1942	3	2	0	1	6	6	–	–
Putte Kock	1943–1956	110	61	20	29	318	195	1950	1948, 1952
Eric Persson	1957–1961	39	26	4	9	100	44	1958	–
