= Carl Linde (football manager) =

Swedish football player, manager, and administrator

Carl "Ceve" Linde
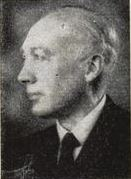
- Carl Linde

Personal information
- Full name: Carl Wilhelm Fredrik Linde (Note: Some sources use the spelling "Vilhelm" instead of "Wilhelm", which corresponds to Linde's nickname and pseudonym "Ceve" that he himself used, e.g. in the title of a book he authored (see the publications). The pseudonym is taken from spelling the initials "C. V." or "C. W." out loud in Swedish. Other sources use the nickname "Cewe" or "CeWe", corresponding to the spelling "Wilhelm".)
- Date of birth: 4 April 1890
- Place of birth: Malmö, Sweden
- Date of death: 13 April 1952 (aged 62)
- Place of death: Gothenburg, Sweden
- Position: Outside forward

Youth career
- IFK Uddevalla

Senior career*
Years	Team	Apps	(Gls)
–1908	IFK Uddevalla		
1908–1912	IFK Göteborg	0	(0)
Total		0	(0)

Managerial career
- 1917–1922: IFK Göteborg (Note: Manager (lagledare) was an administrative role, and should not be confused with the role of head coach.)
- 1928–1936: IFK Göteborg
- 1937: Sweden
6th Chairman of IFK Göteborg
In office 1920–1920
Preceded by	Herbert Johansson
Succeeded by	Knut Albrechtsson
- * Club domestic league appearances and goals

Carl "Ceve" Linde (4 April 1890 – 13 April 1952) was a Swedish football player, manager, administrator and pioneer. He was also involved in Swedish sports in general, and was a prominent sports journalist. He played for IFK Uddevalla and IFK Göteborg during his short playing career. Linde was more successful as a sports manager and administrator, both for IFK Göteborg and the national team. He played a big part in various roles for the national team and the Swedish Football Association, for which he was inducted into the Swedish Football Hall of Fame.

== Early years, playing career, and personal life ==
Born in Malmö on 4 April 1890, Carl Linde was the son of Wilhelm Linde (1847–1890), a firefighter who died before Carl was born, and Anna Katarina Lundberg (1850–1925). His mother remarried and moved to Gothenburg when Carl was still young, and he spent his youth in the city. The physical education teacher at his elementary school, Ebbe Lieberath—who later pioneered Swedish Scouting—, had a big impact on Linde, and put the 10-year-old Linde in charge of the ball and equipment when football at Heden was on the schedule. Linde and some of his classmates soon founded the football club "Ynglingarnas Idrottssällskap"—later renamed to or merged with "Underås Idrottssällskap"—in 1900, one of the earliest football clubs in Gothenburg. (Note: Only 15 clubs had been founded in Gothenburg before the turn of the century, compared to 66 clubs founded between 1900 and 1909.) While at Latinläroverket during his secondary education, Linde participated in some of the first organised school football games in Sweden, playing goalkeeper and midfielder in matches against Realläroverket.

The family moved again when Linde was 14, this time to Uddevalla in 1905, where he took his realskola degree. He brought with him a pair of football boots he had bought in Copenhagen earlier that year—according to himself those were the first pair of football boots sported in Uddevalla. He took part in founding IFK Uddevalla in 1905 and acted as the club's secretary until 1908, and helped found IFK Ljungskile in 1910, the precursor club to Ljungskile SK. Linde was also engaged in sports in general, and initiated the creation of the Bohuslän-Dal Sports Association (Bohuslän-Dals Idrottsförbund) in 1906, acting as secretary until he was recruited by IFK Göteborg in 1908.

He never made an appearance in a national competition for IFK Göteborg, but was part of the senior team between 1908 and 1910, during which time he made seven known appearances in friendlies and minor competitions, including the loss against IFK Stockholm in the 1908 Kamratmästerskapen final match. Linde, described as fiery and quick, mainly played as an outside left forward, but had difficulty taking a place in the team that won the Swedish championships in 1908 and 1910. He ended his playing career in 1910 or 1911, but is known to have made an appearance in a friendly again in 1912.

His achievements as a player include winning the Bohuslän-Dal Football Association district championships—a competition he had originally initiated—with IFK Uddevalla and the Gothenburg Football Association district championships with IFK Göteborg, but also winning district championships in bandy with both clubs, the win with IFK Göteborg in 1919 after having played bandy for the club since 1909. Besides football and bandy, Linde also competed in individual sports such as speed skating, athletics, and diving.

After receiving his degree in Uddevalla, Linde moved back to Gothenburg and started vocational training at Göteborgs Bank to become a bank clerk. His later employment gave him knowledge within areas such as risk analysis, organisation, relations, and economics, which he subsequently applied in his sports administrator career. He married Ingrid Karin Johansson (1891–1995), who he had met during his school years in Uddevalla, in 1917. The pair had two children, Bo-Christer (1918–2011), and Inga-Britt (Note: Or Ingabrit according to one source.) (born 1920). Linde maintained a close friendship with Wilhelm Friberg, founder of Gothenburg rivals Örgryte IS and another pioneer within Swedish football, until Friberg's unexpected death in 1932.

== Administrative career ==
=== IFK Göteborg and IFK Malmö ===
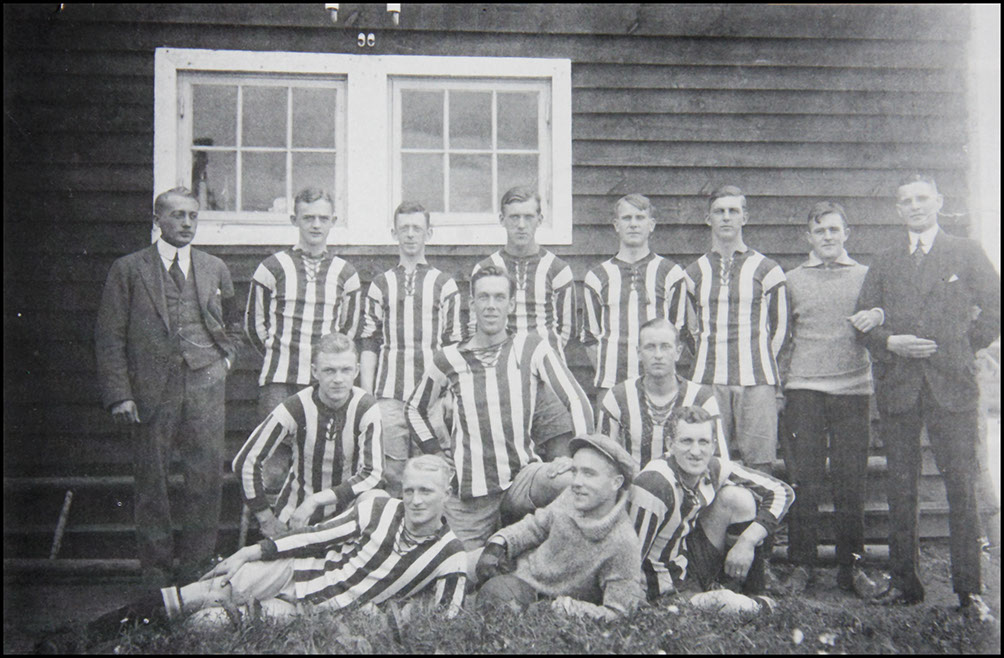
Carl Linde (leftmost) as team manager for IFK Göteborg in 1917, together with the team.

Linde had already held various administrative roles in smaller clubs and associations since he was 15 years old and was also the auditor for IFK Göteborg between 1907 and 1909. But as he ended his short career as a footballer, his new managerial and administrative career really took off. He was part of the board of IFK Göteborg as paymaster in 1910 and 1911, and held a number of different positions on the board during the next ten years, such as master of ceremonies in 1917–1919 and 1921, chairman in 1920, and co-opted member in 1922. He also acted as the team manager from 1917 to 1922. During those years the club won three league titles, Svenska Serien in 1916–17 and Fyrkantserien in 1918 and 1919. The Swedish championship was decided through the cup tournament Svenska Mästerskapet at the time, IFK won in 1918 and reached the semifinals in 1917 and 1920.

He built an impressive international contact network at IFK and dominated the development of the club for 15 years. He brought Danish multi-athlete Nils Middelboe's football philosophy and knowledge to Sweden in 1913, and introduced pre-season training camps in 1917 (a revolutionary concept in Sweden at the time), an idea he had discovered in England during a field trip. As football influences shifted from British to more Central European after the First World War, Linde visited Hungary in 1920 and was impressed by the quick short-passing play of MTK Budapest. A year later, IFK Göteborg contracted Sándor Bródy to coach the club. Bródy became the first Central European head coach in Swedish football. The hiring was the start of an influx of coaches from continental Europe to Sweden, including Willy Meisl, Imre Schlosser, and József Nagy.

At the time of recruiting Bródy, Linde had worked hard to incorporate small neighbourhood clubs, and with the help of their campaign "sports for everyone" ("idrott åt alla") IFK could field seventeen senior, junior and youth teams, a Scandinavian record. The membership numbers also increased, and IFK was at the time one of the largest clubs in Europe in terms of members with 1,100.

In 1923 Linde moved to his birth place Malmö, where he continued his administrative career. He was selected as chairman for the football section of IFK Malmö, the only club from Malmö to participate in the inaugural 1924–25 season of the new national league Allsvenskan. He was chairman from 1922 to 1928, until he moved back to Gothenburg in 1928. As soon as Linde was back in Gothenburg, he was again elected to the board of IFK Göteborg, as secretary from 1928 to 1930, and then chairman for the newly created football section board from 1931 onwards. He was also back acting as team manager from 1928 until 1936, a period during which the team won medals in Allsvenskan all nine seasons, the highlight being the Swedish championship title in 1934–35.

Linde is credited with having discovered Herbert Carlsson—the top goalscorer of the 1920 Olympics—, and Gunnar Gren—one of Sweden's greatest footballers, who Linde first saw at a juggling contest he arranged in 1934. Gren, only 13 years old, won the contest against several Allsvenskan players, and Linde wrote a column about the artistry of Gren, likening him to Italian juggler and acrobat Enrico Rastelli.

=== Swedish Football Association ===
Linde did not only concern himself with the clubs and associations he was closest to, he was from an early age also active in the debate on Swedish football in general, and the Swedish Football Association (SvFF) and national team in particular. As soon as the first ever international for Sweden had been played in 1908, Linde had a letter published in the large Swedish sports newspaper Nordiskt Idrottslif where he complained about the decisions made by SvFF in picking the team.

On 13 October 1913, aged 23, he staged a protest meeting in Exercishuset in Gothenburg attended by around a thousand people. They demanded the resignation of the board of the football association, and the formation of a new Selection Committee (uttagningskommittén) (Note: The Selection Committee existed from 1908 to 1961, and was the group of managers that selected the national team squad.) after two devastating losses (0–8 and 0–10) against Denmark. The meeting also demanded that the national team only be composed either of players from Gothenburg or from Stockholm (Note: The disharmony and disagreements between Stockholm and Gothenburg was commonly seen as the reason for the poor results of the national team in the 1908 Summer Olympics.)—and not a mix as SvFF had decided—to have a better chance with an already tight-knit team rather than the perceived shortsighted and random existing selection. Linde and the rest of the members of the formed Exercishus Committee were debarred by SvFF for violation of statutes. At the Football Association's annual meeting in 1914, the sitting secretary Anton Johanson suggested re-election of the current board and himself as secretary, laconically adding "you won't get anyone else anyway".

That was just one of many battles with Johanson that were to come. As football in Scania got its national breakthrough, Linde at least found his ally in the chairman of Helsingborgs IF, John "Bill" Pettersson, who had written several critical newspaper columns directed towards SvFF and Anton Johanson before an international planned to be played in Helsingborg in 1915. As with Linde, he was disposed of by Johanson (and the match was moved from Helsingborg), both were soon taken to grace again. But the animosity between Stockholm—the capital and seat of SvFF—and the rest of the country—primarily Gothenburg as the capital of Swedish football—remained, leading Johanson to once exclaim that "Gothenburgers are not real Swedes", while Linde countered with pointing out that Sweden had played more internationals than any other country, but still lacked a playing system and solid tactics.

The turning point came after the 1920 Summer Olympics where Sweden once again did poorly. Linde had had enough, and wrote:

The whole story of our Olympic team is from beginning to end a repetition of the sad failure of 1912. Anton Johanson has forgotten a lot, but learnt nothing. Our football has excellent player material, great resources and an enthusiastic audience, but we will always be left behind when it really matters, as long as the football game, the most democratic of all sports, won't be promoted under a despotic and domineering tyrant's dictatorship. — But this is the last straw! — Away with the football-corrupted elements, away with the award-chasing egoists, away with the tail-wagging petty kings, who for years have allowed themselves to be duped by the Potemian builder Johanson's beautiful promises and well-calculated election maneuvers, away with the intriguers, the zeros and the thoughtless pursuers! — Away with Anton Johanson!

Johanson struck back at his enemies by suspending the whole Olympic squad from further national team activities, for breaches of the amateur rules. The question on amateur or professional football was contentious at the time, and Johanson wanted to professionalise Swedish football, while Linde did not. The squad, with support from the enemies Johanson had made, presented evidence that contradicted his story, and also showed that Johanson had previously broken the amateur rules himself, when it suited him. Johanson managed to keep his position as secretary of the Football Association in the annual meeting for 1921, but left the Selection Committee he had chaired since 1917, giving up direct control of the national team to new chairman John "Bill" Pettersson (who had been on the committee since 1918) and his newly elected ally Carl Linde.

As of 1921, Linde was now on the board of SvFF, as well as a member of the Selection Committee, in the centre of all things he had previously criticised. He would keep his board seat until 1950, and was selected as an honorary member in 1951. From within, Linde implemented his ideas—though he had abandoned the preference for single-city team selections—and through his international network József Nagy was soon recruited to coach the national team. With a young team (partially due to a still unresolved amateurism conflict) picked for the 1924 Olympics, the 8–1 opening victory over reigning Olympic champions Belgium was a positive surprise. So much so that it was reported how Linde, John "Bill" Pettersson, and their common nemesis Anton Johanson fell into each other's arms crying in the changing room after the game. Sweden went on to clinch the bronze medal, the first medal ever for the national team.

Due to the whims of Johanson, Sweded did not enter the 1928 Olympics, likely due to his animosity towards Cornelis August Wilhelm Hirschman, the Dutch general secretary of FIFA. The next tournament up was the inaugural 1930 FIFA World Cup, conceived at the 1928 FIFA Congress where Linde's old Austrian friend Hugo Meisl was selected to lead the preparatory committee. Linde had convinced the Austrian that a cup format in a single country was preferable to a multi-league continental zone format, and he had even hoped that Sweden would host the tournament, which in the end was awarded to Uruguay. Sweden did not even send a squad to Uruguay, as most other European countries, and the following 1934 FIFA World Cup in Italy was neither a success nor a failure, as the national team was eliminated in the quarter-finals by bronze medallists Germany.

In the meantime, as football in Sweden stagnated, the Swedish Football Association under the direction of Linde formed the Technical Committee (tekniska kommittén) in 1931, with the mission to develop the playing skills within Swedish football. At the end of the year, the committee had held introductory district courses for 237 participants from 138 different clubs, which was expanded by a central course the year after and a nationwide course for 24 participants in 1934. This laid the foundation for a four part coaching education programme supplemented by conferences, camps and other courses that by 1979 had 26,000 participants spread among 900 different events. The committee also collaborated with schools, Linde having the underlying thought that the national team would also benefit from it in the long run. Linde stayed as chairman and chief instructor of the Technical Committee for 20 years, leaving his post in 1950, when he also left the board of SvFF.

The new national football stadium Råsunda was inaugurated in 1937. Administered by the limited company AB Fotbollsstadion at which Linde was one of the board members, it provided the national team with the largest and most modern stadium in the Nordic countries. The same year Råsunda was opened, Linde stepped in as the chairman of the Selection Committee and manager of the national team for a short stint, and as such led the team through the 1938 FIFA World Cup qualifiers. He handed over the leadership before the World Cup, and also left the Selection Committee, only staying in the Technical Committee and on the main board for the rest of his SvFF involvement. His deeds in further developing Swedish football were not left unnoticed, and he is credited with being the mastermind that laid the foundation for the coming national team successes—a fourth place at the 1938 FIFA World Cup, and in the post-war era winners of the 1948 Summer Olympics, a third place at the 1950 FIFA World Cup, a third place at the 1952 Summer Olympics, and runners up at the 1958 FIFA World Cup in Sweden—all in all four medals and a fourth place in five participations. Linde did not live to see what he had fought for since the 1930 tournament, his idea of a World Cup at home, but is given credit for making that dream come true six years after his death.

With regards to the Swedish national club competitions, Linde was a proponent of creating a single top-level division. The experiment with a two-group Svenska Serien in 1922–23 and 1923–24 had made the clubs in the eastern group less competitive, even though the club finances had become better as fewer league games allowed for more profitable friendlies against touring foreign clubs. To increase competitiveness, the modern-day Allsvenskan was created in 1924, but Linde never accepted this as a new league, as it essentially erased 15 years of Gothenburg dominance in its previous Svenska Serien incarnation, writing about the 1924 premiere that it "took place without major ceremonies on the part of the organizers and without further attention from the audience. When the Allsvenskan series was started for the first time fourteen years ago, it took place under drums and trumpets[...]". (Note: The official annual reports of the Swedish Football Association used the name "Svenska Serien" until 1934, when it was changed to "Allsvenskan", in part as a marketing stunt to increase interest in the league under Rudolf Eklöw's reign as editor for the official yearbook, who released the 1934 book as a 10-year jubilee. The 1924 start has since become part of official history.) Allsvenskan started as a 12-team league, but Linde argued adamantly for a 10-team league, a wish that never came to fruition.

Sweden had also lacked a national cup since 1925 when Svenska Mästerskapet was made defunct. Through SvFF, Linde was part of the 1941 committee that was tasked with organising the new cup competition, Svenska Cupen, and Linde is seen as its spiritual father together with Elof Ericsson.

=== Other football roles ===
To counter the constant tension between the three major Gothenburg clubs—IFK Göteborg, Örgryte IS, and GAIS—that had characterised early football in the city, Linde took the initiative in forming Göteborgsalliansen in 1919 (with Örgryte IS), and then formally on 13 January 1921 with all three clubs. The alliance took a common stance against the municipality in questions regarding rent for training pitches and stadiums, agreed to not sign players from each other, and also arranged international friendlies and pre-season tournaments for the clubs. Carl Linde was the IFK representative in the alliance between 1919 and 1923 and then again from 1928 to 1931.

Linde was also the initiator and founder of Swedish Professional Football Leagues in 1928, an interest organisation for the Swedish elite football clubs that acted as a counterpart to the Swedish Football Association, with which top division clubs did not have a well-functioning relationship at that time. In a statement, Linde wrote that the association would be "a useful safety valve against abuse from the FA against those who primarily generate the good finances of football and make players available to the national team."

While living in Gothenburg, Linde was also usually part of the board of the Gothenburg Football Association, first as a member in 1920 and vice-chairman in 1922, and then he became chairman of the association from 1933 and remained in this position until his death.

=== Other sports roles ===
Having previously played bandy in Göteborg, Linde took part in creating the bandy and ice hockey committee of the Scania Football Association in 1924 while living in Malmö. Linde was selected as chairman of the committee, which later formed the independent Scanian Bandy Association. The first bandy district championships in Scania were held in 1927, won by IFK Malmö, under Linde's guardianship (1925–1928). For unknown reasons, Linde was denied any prominent role when it came to the football activities of the Scania Football Association.

In 1926 Linde took part in founding the Swedish Table Tennis Association and was chosen as the organisation's first chairman, a role he held until 1928. As such, he was also present as the Swedish representative when the International Table Tennis Federation was formed that same year, and sat on the advisory committee for the first three years, from 1926–27 to 1928–29. Other sports Linde took an interest in included motorsports—as secretary for the Scanian Automobile Club (Skånska automobilklubben) in 1926 and 1927—, boxing—as board member for the Swedish Boxing Federation in 1919 and 1920—, and wrestling—as chairman for the Gothenburg Wrestling Association from 1931 (or 1930) until his death. He also officiated in bandy, wrestling and football.

When sports betting was legalised and monopolised in Sweden in 1934 through state concessions to the private company AB Tipstjänst, Linde was appointed to the board. Part of the profits were returned to the sports movement, and a rapid rise in betting activities—Tipstjänst employed 6,000 people two years after the start, making it the fifth largest company in Sweden—meant that almost 23 million Swedish kronor was handed out between 1935 and 1939, as compared to 45,000 kronor in 1934. AB Tipstjänst was nationalised in 1943, but Linde kept his board membership until he died in 1952.

== Journalist and writer ==
At an early age, Linde wrote sports articles for the newspapers Bohusläns Tidning (1905–1908) and Göteborgs-Posten (1906–1909) before moving to the sports newspaper Nordiskt Idrottslif in 1907, working there until 1913 (as editor from 1911) or 1914. Between 1914 and 1916, Linde worked for the sports magazine Idrott which he himself published, until moving to the leading sports magazine Idrottsbladet in 1916, working for legendary entrepreneurial sports journalist, editor-in-chief, and owner Torsten Tegnér. He worked as the Gothenburg editor between 1916 and 1922 and then again from 1929 on, with a period as Malmö editor in 1923–1928 while living there. It was as a columnist for Idrottsbladet he started using the pseudonym "Ceve", formed from his two first names Carl and Wilhelm. Linde also worked as the Swedish correspondent for several foreign sports magazines.

Tegnér saw Linde's potential and gave him free rein, and when Nordiskt Idrottslif stopped being published in 1920, Idrottsbladet took up the slack and developed its sports coverage to something "new and fresh". The match coverage shifted to a more neutral approach from its previous moralistic and scientific approach. Tegnér mainly covered the moralistic view in separate articles, and Linde wrote large amounts of more technical and scientific articles about e.g. tactical systems and training tips. Linde had previously been criticised at Nordiskt Idrottslif for having a boot in both camps, when he in a match commentary criticised an Örgryte IS player's behaviour against IFK Göteborg, at a time when he himself was part of the IFK board.

He continued his open debate until he died, on such various subjects as the question on amateurism or professionalism (Linde was initially opposed to professionalism but got more pragmatic over time), the offside rule (Linde preferred the old "three opponents" variant), youth football (Linde believed in focusing on youth development but without early elite initiatives), the conflicts between the Swedish Football Association and the clubs, and different tactical systems (Linde was an early proponent of both the 4-2-4 and the 4-1-2-3 formations). His open debate during the 1930s with Rudolf Eklöw regarding tactical systems now forms part of a university course in football knowledge.

While on the Swedish Football Association Technical Committee, Linde published multiple books on football, directed the recording of instructional videos and created instructional course material for football. Linde took initiative in forming the Sports Journalist's Club (Idrottsjournalisternas klubb) in Gothenburg in 1922, and was among the forming members of the International Sports Press Association (AIPS) that handles journalist accreditations at football World Cups, European Championships and the Olympics.

== Death and legacy ==
Linde died relatively young—shortly after his 62nd birthday—on 13 April 1952 in Gothenburg. He is buried in Örgryte New Cemetery, Gothenburg. Characterised by his diligence, sports author Gunnar Persson notes that "it is no bold guess that he worked himself to death", and sports journalist Jesper Högström writes that he died "worn out by a life in the service of football".

Linde was awarded the knight's class Order of Vasa, the Swedish Sports Confederation badge of merit, and the medal of merit of Centralföreningen för Gymnastik- och Idrottssällskapen i Göteborg while active. He was posthumously inducted to the Gothenburg Sports Hall of Fame in 1999, and the Swedish table tennis Hall of Fame in 2022, one year after its establishment. Linde was inducted to the Swedish Football Hall of Fame in 2015 with the following motivation:

As Swedish football's great chief ideologue, "Ceve" was behind the Swedish coaching education that laid the foundation for our heyday with four medals and a fourth place in five championship starts. It got its epilogue at home, which was also an idea from "Ceve".

Linde has been described as one of the greatest leaders in IFK Göteborg history who, along with Anders Bernmar, set the foundation for the professional structure of today's club. In regards to Swedish football, he has been said to be "a name no one could compete with" and "undoubtedly ranking as the foremost Swedish football adept" in the first half of the 20th century, and the de facto foreign minister of Swedish football. He is mentioned as one of the pioneers of Swedish football, and a central figure in Swedish football seen over all time.

Sports writers have dubbed him the most "international association leader" together with Anton Johanson, Swedish football's "first great theorist and visionary", and famed sports journalist Lennart Crusner described him as "physically and intellectually one of the most complete persons I have ever had the privilege to meet". He was passionate as an educator, and fostered players on all levels of football, combined with an ability to entertain and bind an audience. His work was enthusiastic and groundbreaking, but he was also controversial and combative, challenging the existing state of affairs as somewhat of a rebel, not seldom battling with Anton Johanson, the then "family head" of Swedish football. As for his journalism, he has been described as knowledgeable and one of the most productive and knowledgeable sports journalists of his era.

=== Controversies and politics ===
As an administrator and journalist, Linde never avoided criticising what he believed was wrong, and as such his whole persona has been described as controversial. Linde fought against paternalism throughout his career, and while on the Selection Committee defended the national team players that he believed were treated not "as our equals, but as a pariah class without rights but with all obligations. We act as a kind of employer, and relying on the unrestricted power and inviolability of the board, we believe we can treat the players in any way."

But he came under fire after the 1934 FIFA World Cup in Italy as the players had made the Roman salute before the opening match against Argentina. Players and Linde defended it as not a Roman salute at all, but instead friendly arm-waving, while John "Bill" Pettersson (then chairman of the Selection Committee) admitted it to be a fascist salute. Linde at the same time blamed team coach József Nagy, who was working in Italy at the time, for advising the players to salute the spectators. Linde wrote a long text on fascism and nazism, recognising the downsides, but also apologetically stated that Hitler "had the youth on his side" and that the nazis in many aspects "were more tolerant than some Swedish trade unions"—a reference to the fact that Ernst Andersson, one of the players, was forced to apologise by his trade union Metall.

During World War II, all the potential national team opponents were either occupied by Nazi Germany, allied with them, or only reachable through their territory, which limited the selection of internationals. As such, Sweden played Germany in a famous match at Olympiastadion in Berlin in 1942. On the day of travel, the players noted that Carl Linde was missing from the airplane. Linde was one of three officials travelling with the national team, appointed as trip leader alongside the manager and team coach. His entry visa had been refused the day before, and the association hushed the matter up so as not to hurt relations with Germany. Linde's replacement Hilding Hallgren had no difficulty in obtaining an entry visa on short notice, and the Swedish Ministry for Foreign Affairs recommended not to cancel the trip. As Linde had good relations with German sports officials—he was asked to cicerone a German Football Association visit to Sweden a short time before the incident—, and had no problems obtaining a German entry visa for a trip to Hamburg in november 1941, the reason for the refusal was not only Linde as a person. The reasons for the denied visa likely included Linde's now averse stance against Germany, his close relations with uncompromising anti-Nazi Torgny Segerstedt, and the harsh criticism against the Nazis by Linde's editor-in-chief Torsten Tegnér at Idrottsbladet. The Germans had developed a greater aversion against the Swedish press during 1942, and even though there was no official reason for the visa refusal, it was likely part of a political reprisal against Idrottsbladet specifically, and the Swedish press in general.

== Career statistics ==
=== Player ===
Carl Linde's appearances for IFK Uddevalla are unknown, his incomplete appearance record for IFK Göteborg includes:

- 1908: 2 matches (1 match in Kamratmästerskapen, 1 friendly), 0 goals
- 1909: 3 matches (1 match in Krokslättspokalen, 2 friendlies), 0 goals
- 1910: 4 matches (4 friendlies), 0 goals
- 1912: 1 match (1 friendly), 0 goals

=== Manager ===
Managerial record by team and tenure
Team	From	To	Record					Ref.
Team	From	To	M	W	D	L	Win %	Ref.
IFK Göteborg	1917	1922	65	37	12	16	56.92	
IFK Göteborg	1928	1936	196	107	40	49	54.59	
Sweden	1937	1937	8	2	1	5	25.00	
Total			269	146	53	70	54.28	

== Publications ==
- Linde, Carl (1934). Allt om fotboll [Everything about football] (in Swedish). Stockholm: Åhlén & Åkerlund.
- ————— (1934). Modern fotbollsträning [Modern football practice] (in Swedish). Göteborg: Ferd. Lundquist & Co.
- —————; Samuelsson, Ernst Hjalmar (1934). Göteborgs atlet- & idrottssällskap 1894–1934 [Göteborgs atlet- & idrottssällskap 1894–1934] (in Swedish). Göteborg.
- ————— (1939). Pojkarnas fotbollbok: Svenska fotbollförbundets instruktionsbok [The boys' football book: the Swedish Football Association instruction book] (in Swedish). Stockholm: Svenska fotbollförbundet.
- ————— (1941). 100 moderna metoder för fotbollsträning [100 modern methods for football practice] (in Swedish). Göteborg.
- ————— (1945). Göteborgs fotbollsförbund 1905–1945 [Gothenburg Football Association 1905–1945] (in Swedish). Göteborg.
- ————— (1949). Ceves fotbollsbok: för ungdomsledare [Ceve's football book: for youth coaches] (in Swedish). Göteborg: Bergendahls.
