= Carl Linde =

Carl Linde may refer to:

- Carl von Linde (1842–1934), German scientist, engineer, and businessman
- Carl L. Linde (1864–1945), German-American architect
- Carl Linde (football manager) (1890–1952), Swedish football player, manager, administrator and journalist
