= Gothenburg Sports Hall of Fame =

The Gothenburg Sports Hall of Fame (Swedish: Idrottens Hall of Fame i Göteborg) is a regional hall of fame honouring athletes and leaders from—or associated with—Gothenburg, Sweden. The hall of fame was established in 1999 with the help of a Gothenburg sports museum, Idrottsmuseet i Göteborg, where the full hall of fame is exhibited. The first year also presented four honourable mentions. Candidates are selected by an independent jury each year, and the new inductees are unveiled at a Liseberg ceremony.

== History ==
The idea for the hall of fame was conceived by Åke Lindegarth in cooperation with Idrottsmuseet i Göteborg. The hall of fame forms a permanent exhibit in the museum, and each year a ceremony at the amusement park Liseberg presents the new members, who are also covered in the museum's yearbook, Idrottsarvet (transl. Sports heritage).

The original 1999 inductees were selected by a jury after a process of receiving suggestions from Swedish district sports federations, sports clubs (active for at least 75 years) and members of the public. This gross list was assessed by some 60 sports journalists and 50 sports leaders and their results formed the basis for the jury, selecting the original 22 athlete and 13 leader inductees. The jury also selected two sports journalists and two club teams that received honourable mentions.

An additional 18 athletes and leaders were honoured in 2000, since then around five to ten new inductees have selected each year. No new hall of fame members were selected for 2020 as an effect of the COVID-19 pandemic in Sweden, which resulted in reduced activity and a tough financial situation for the museum. The induction of new members was resumed in 2021.

== Criteria ==
The criteria for induction in the hall of fame were defined in 1999 as:

- Must not have participated in their main sport for a minimum of five years
- Must be either born in Gothenburg or have competed or acted in Gothenburg for a minimum of five years

The first criteria regarding end of an active career has later been eased, the chairman of the museum stated in 2019 that the rule had already been relaxed for leaders as "some leaders are leaders for their whole life". By 2021 the waiting period was shortened to three years, and the criteria for persons born outside Gothenburg was also modified to having competed or acted in Gothenburg for a minimum of three rather than five years.

== Inductees ==
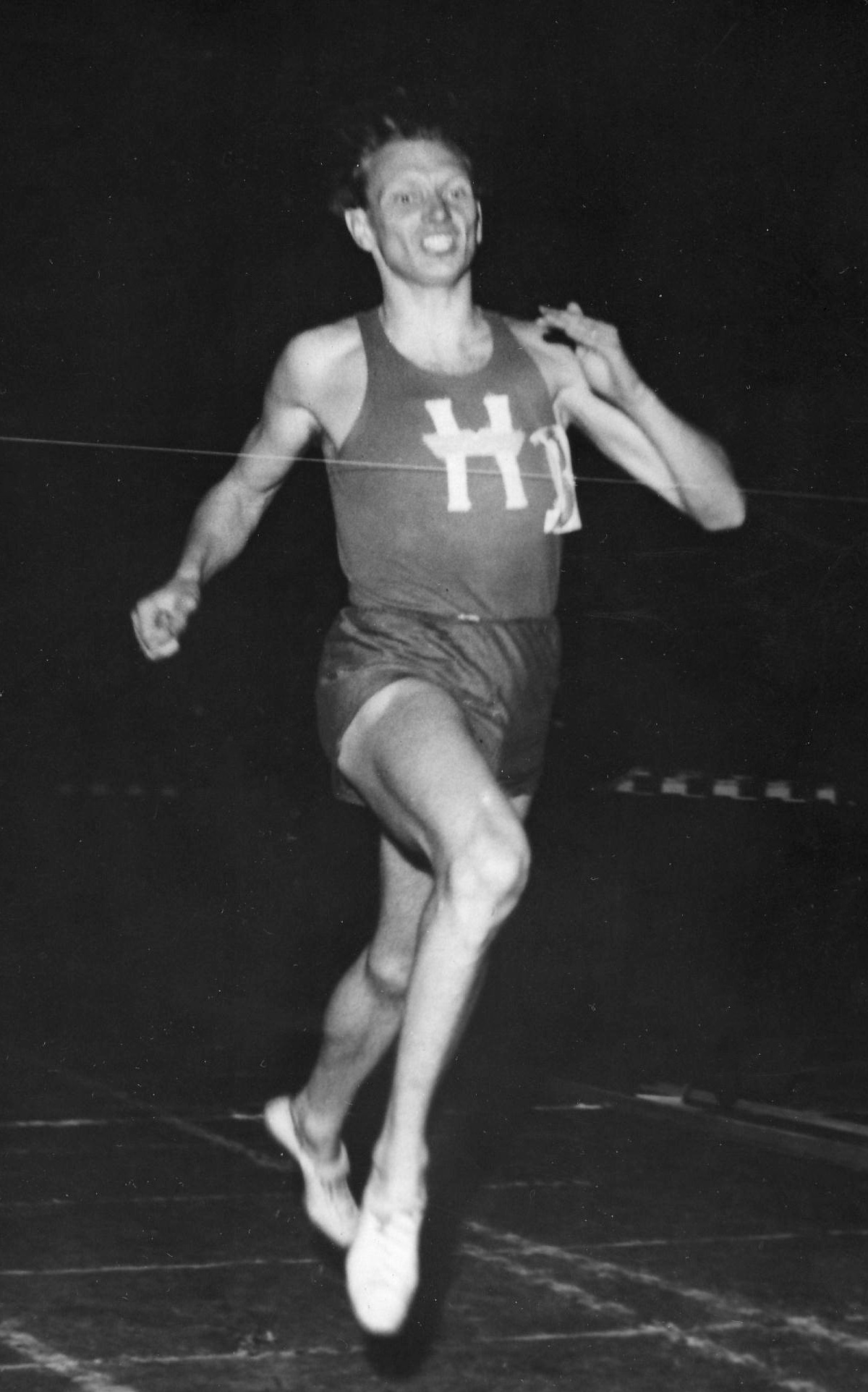
Arne Andersson crossing the finish line of a race.

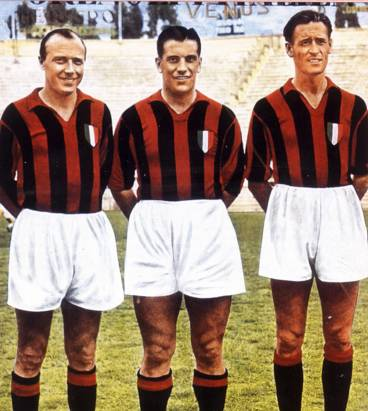
Gunnar Gren, leftmost, while at AC Milan with Gunnar Nordahl and Nils Liedholm.

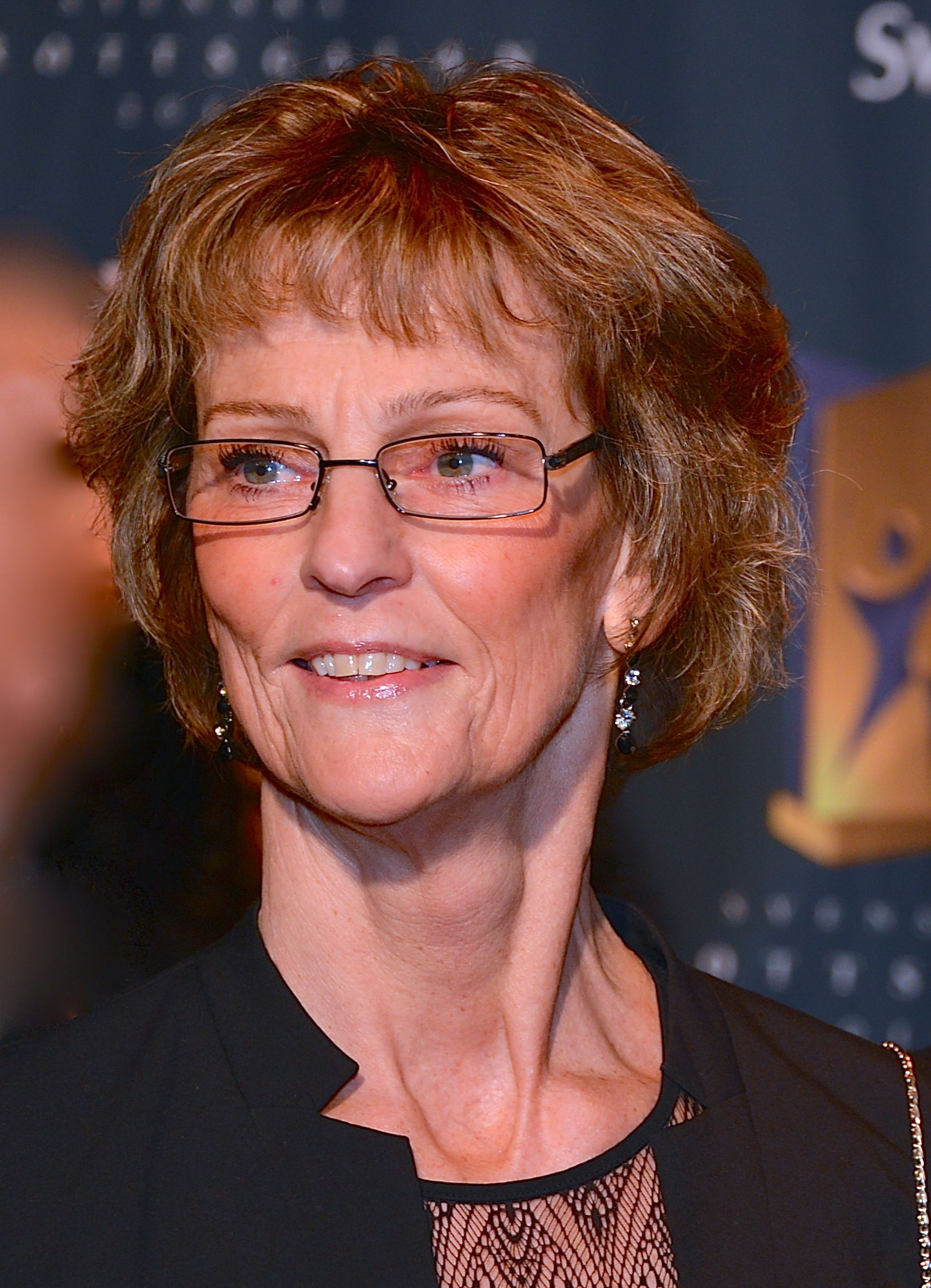
Ulrika Knape at the Swedish Sports Awards in 2013.

List of inductees as of 2021: (Note: See Källström and Idrottsmuseet – Om Hall of Fame for lists of inductees in overview.)

Name (Note: Name as listed in the individual reference.)	Birth date	Category	Sport/organisation (Note: The sport/organisation of the inductee is based on the official website list, Idrottsmuseet – Om Hall of Fame. Other sources including the individual references and Källström may in some cases list additional or slightly differing sports/organisations.)	Year inducted	Ref
Arvid Adamsson	17 February 1914	Athlete	Road bicycle racing	1999	
Edwin Ahlqvist	28 January 1898	Leader	Boxing	1999	
John Albrechtsson	22 July 1936	Athlete	Sailing	2000	
Gösta Algeskog	6 December 1923	Athlete	Bowling	1999	
Ingrid Almqvist	10 October 1927	Athlete	Athletics	2008	
Arne Andersson	27 October 1917	Athlete	Athletics	1999	
Hilding Andersson	12 November 1915	Leader	Orienteering, cross-country skiing	1999	
Åke Andersson	29 October 1921	Leader	Orienteering	2003	
Harald Andersson-Arbin	1867	Athlete	Athletics, diving	2012	
Catrine Bengtsson	1969	Athlete	Badminton	2013	
Bengt Berndtsson	26 January 1933	Athlete	Football	2000	
Ivar Berger	10 June 1861	Leader	Swedish Sports Confederation	2008	
Karin Bergström	14 February 1916	Leader	Athletics	1999	
Anders Bernmar	30 September 1917	Leader	Football, ice hockey	1999	
Alva Björk	26 March 1913	Athlete	Tennis	2001	
Joel Björkman	25 July 1890	Leader	Football	2004	
Arne Bladh	1904	Leader	Ice hockey	2013	
Gert Blomé	1934	Athlete	Ice hockey	2012	
Maria Brandin	4 September 1963	Athlete	Rowing	2006	
Gunnar Brusberg	28 November 1927	Athlete	Handball	1999	
Kjell Bäckman	21 February 1934	Athlete	Speed skating	2002	
Anette Börjesson	11 November 1954	Athlete	Football, badminton	2000	
Erik Börjesson	1 December 1886	Athlete	Football	1999	
Reino Börjesson	1929	Athlete	Football	2012	
Bror Carlsson	5 May 1921	Leader	Badminton	2009	
Gösta Carlsson	31 January 1938	Athlete	Handball	1999	
Roger Carlsson	18 February 1945	Leader	Handball	2005	
Gösta Dalman	1884	Leader	Football	2011	
Kurt Durewall	1924	Leader	Jujutsu	2012	
Ralf Edström	1952	Athlete	Football	2013	
Sigfrid Edström	21 November 1870	Leader	International Olympic Committee	1999	
Mona-Lisa Englund-Crispin	3 February 1933	Athlete	Athletics, handball	2000	
Sara Eriksson-Dikanda	1974	Athlete	Wrestling	2013	
Thomas Fredriksson	1949	Leader	Basketball	2012	
Åke Fredriksson	13 October 1919	Leader	Cross-country skiing	1999	
Sven Friberg	7 February 1895	Athlete	Football	2010	
Wilhelm Friberg	25 July 1865	Leader	Football	1999	
Anders Frisk	1963	Leader	Football referee	2013	
Ove Fundin	23 May 1933	Athlete	Speedway	1999	
Gunnar Gren	31 October 1920	Athlete	Football	1999	
Bengt Gustafson	27 May 1963	Athlete	Volleyball	2009	
Roger Gustafsson	29 February 1952	Leader	Football	2010	
Stig Gustafsson	1922	Leader	Handball	2011	
Claes Hellgren	1955	Athlete	Handball	2011	
Mia Hermansson-Högdahl	6 May 1965	Athlete	Handball	2005	
Lars Hindmar	11 December 1921	Athlete	Racewalking	2000	
Stig Hjortsberg	12 April 1915	Athlete	Handball	2002	
Harry Hjörne	26 April 1893	Leader	Örgryte IS	2008	
Glenn Hysén	30 October 1959	Athlete	Football	2002	
Gustav Håkansson	11 June 1921	Leader	Athletics	2000	
Bo Högberg	18 December 1938	Athlete	Boxing	2001	
Karl-Alfred Jacobsson	15 January 1926	Athlete	Football	2000	
Sven Jacobsson	17 April 1914	Athlete	Football	2004	
Tuulikki Jahre	1951	Athlete	Road bicycle racing	2011	
Martin Jansson	30 October 1888	Leader	Athletics	2001	
Ulf Jarfelt	1948	Leader	Athletics	2011	
Roland Jerneryd	27 May 1915	Leader	Gothenburg sports	2010	
Björn Jilsén	8 January 1959	Athlete	Handball	2006	
Bengt Johansson	18 June 1926	Leader	Ice hockey	1999	
Bertil Johansson	22 March 1935	Athlete	Football	2000	
Bo Johansson	7 February 1945	Athlete	Weightlifting	2006	
Calle Johansson	1967	Athlete	Ice hockey	2011	
Claes Johansson	4 January 1884	Athlete	Wrestling	1999	
Erica Johansson	5 February 1974	Athlete	Athletics	2009	
Filip Johansson	21 January 1902	Athlete	Football	2000	
Herbert Johansson	22 June 1888	Leader	Football	2003	
Ingemar Johansson	22 September 1932	Athlete	Boxing	1999	
John Johansson	15 September 1895	Leader	Football	1999	
Kjell Johansson	5 October 1946	Athlete	Table tennis	1999	
Olof Johansson	1947	Leader	Boxing	2012	
Per-Olof Johansson	22 June 1932	Leader	Football, handball	2001	
Sture Johnsson	27 September 1945	Athlete	Badminton	2008	
Stig A. Jönsson	25 October 1928	Leader	Athletics	2001	
Ulrika Knape-Lindberg	26 April 1955	Athlete	Diving	1999	
Rune Kristiansson	26 March 1932	Leader	Football	2001	
Gunnar Kämpendahl	27 January 1937	Athlete	Handball	2003	
Henry Lagergren	23 December 1904	Leader	Handball	2000	
Ulla-Britt Lagerström	27 June 1928	Athlete	Athletics, handball, badminton	2004	
Eivor Lagman-Olsson	27 September 1922	Athlete	Athletics	2007	
Gunnar Larsson	29 March 1940	Leader	Football	2008	
Karin Larsson	21 December 1931	Leader	Athletics	2010	
Sven-Agne Larsson	6 October 1925	Leader	Football	2004	
Thorsten Larsson	8 September 1911	Leader	Boxing	2001	
Thure Larsson	1948	Leader	Gothenburg sports	2011	
David Lega	12 October 1973	Athlete	Swimming	2006	
Eric Lemming	22 February 1880	Athlete	Athletics	1999	
Hugo Levin	1886	Leader	Football	2013	
Ann-Britt Leyman-Olsson	10 June 1922	Athlete	Athletics	2001	
Håkan Lidman	31 January 1915	Athlete	Athletics	2000	
Einar Lilie	26 July 1890	Leader	Women's sports	2008	
Donald Lindblom	23 August 1937	Athlete	Handball	2003	
Carl Linde	4 April 1890	Leader	Football	1999	
Åke Lindegarth	20 January 1932	Leader	Gothenburg sports	2002	
Karl-Eric Lindfors	4 March 1934	Leader	Table tennis	2010	
Mikael Ljungberg	13 June 1970	Athlete	Wrestling	2005	
Lars-Eric Lundvall	3 April 1934	Athlete	Ice hockey	2000	
Thora Löfgren-Pihl	20 August 1929	Athlete	Handball	2008	
Erik Malmberg	15 March 1897	Athlete	Wrestling	2000	
Ivar Nilsson	12 June 1933	Athlete	Speed skating	2005	
Jonny Nilsson	9 February 1943	Athlete	Speed skating	1999	
Rune Nilsson	4 May 1928	Athlete	Handball	2004	
Torbjörn Nilsson	9 July 1954	Athlete	Football	2001	
Åke Nilsson	16 November 1924	Leader	Handball	1999	
Björn Nordqvist	6 October 1942	Athlete	Football	2006	
Viljo Nousiainen	9 March 1944	Leader	Athletics	2004	
Arne Nyberg	20 June 1913	Athlete	Football	2007	
Evert Nyberg	28 February 1925	Athlete	Athletics	2004	
Albert Olsson	28 November 1896	Leader	Football	2001	
Hans Olsson	28 March 1929	Athlete	Handball	2001	
Leif Olsson	12 July 1942	Leader	Handball	2004	
Evy Palm	1942	Athlete	Long-distance running	2012	
Kerstin Palm	5 February 1946	Athlete	Fencing	1999	
Örjan Persson	27 August 1942	Athlete	Football	2009	
Jörgen Pettersson	11 July 1956	Athlete	Ice hockey	2010	
Pelle Pettersson	31 July 1932	Athlete	Sailing	1999	
Ronald Pettersson	16 April 1935	Athlete	Ice hockey	1999	
Rustan Pettersson	29 October 1917	Leader	Handball	2007	
Gunnar Quist	20 November 1932	Leader	Handball	2002	
Thomas Ravelli	13 August 1959	Athlete	Football	2003	
Benny Rosén	26 December 1929	Leader	Football	2005	
Gösta Rutgersson	15 June 1932	Leader	Handball	2006	
Sven Rydell	14 January 1905	Athlete	Football	1999	
Ewa Rydell-Orrensjö	26 February 1942	Leader	Gymnastics	2000	
Bertil Rönnberg	26 December 1913	Leader	Ice hockey	2000	
Christina Sandberg-Lang	1948	Athlete	Tennis	2011	
Erik Save	16 October 1912	Leader	Speed skating	2000	
Viktor Hugo Setterberg	28 March 1859	Leader	Golf	2009	
Agne Simonsson	19 October 1935	Athlete	Football	1999	
Patrik Sjöberg	5 January 1965	Athlete	Athletics	2003	
Arne Sjöqvist	26 July 1890	Leader	Handball	2008	
Birgit Solhult	19 August 1917	Leader	Gymnastics	2005	
Eivor Steen-Olsson	5 January 1937	Athlete	Orienteering	2002	
Ulf Sterner	11 February 1941	Athlete	Ice hockey	2008	
Jan Stiberg	1937	Leader	Handball, football	2013	
Tage Stolpe	5 April 1910	Leader	Speed skating	1999	
Glenn Strömberg	5 January 1960	Athlete	Football	2009	
Sven Strömberg	22 January 1911	Leader	Athletics	2000	
Pia Sundhage	13 February 1960	Athlete	Football	2010	
Ruth Svedberg	14 April 1903	Leader	Athletics	1999	
Erik Svensson	10 April 1898	Leader	Football	2005	
Irma Ternstrand	21 April 1936	Leader	Gymnastics	2007	
William Thoresson	31 May 1932	Athlete	Gymnastics	1999	
Hjördis Töpel	5 January 1904	Athlete	Swimming, diving	2003	
Erik Uddebom	5 July 1934	Athlete	Athletics, weightlifting	2007	
Björne Väggö	1955	Athlete	Fencing	2011	
Dan Waern	17 January 1933	Athlete	Athletics	1999	
Karin Wallgren-Lundgren	19 May 1944	Athlete	Athletics	2000	
Arvid Wallman	3 February 1901	Athlete	Diving	2001	
Gunnel Weinås	24 July 1935	Leader	Diving	2006	
Lennart Wing	7 August 1935	Athlete	Football	2008	
Magnus Wislander	22 February 1964	Athlete	Handball	2010	
Rolf Zachrisson	29 October 1926	Athlete	Handball	2007	
Thörner Åhsman	30 July 1931	Athlete	Boxing	2009	
Sten Åkerstedt	1 September 1926	Athlete	Handball	1999	
Elisabeth Östberg	29 August 1940	Leader	Athletics	2009	

== Honourable mentions ==
List of honourable mentions awarded to journalists as of 2021:

Name	Birth date	Year awarded	Ref
Gunnar Bongberg	19 January 1914	2000	
Lars-Gunnar Björklund	24 February 1937	2003	
Lennart Crusner	12 July 1924	1999	
Sven Ekström	28 April 1914	1999	
Helge Härneman	18 September 1899	2000	
Harry Lundahl	16 October 1905	2001	

List of honourable mentions awarded to club teams as of 2021:

Team	Team year(s)	Sport	Year awarded	Ref
IFK Göteborg	1982	Football	1999	
Kvinnliga IK Sport	1949–1968	Handball	2001	
Majornas IK	1937–1946	Handball	1999	
Redbergslids IK	1959	Handball	1999	
Västra Frölunda IF	1965	Ice hockey	2003	
Örgryte IS	1959	Football	2000	
