= Clarence von Rosen =

Swedish athlete and military officer (1867–1955)

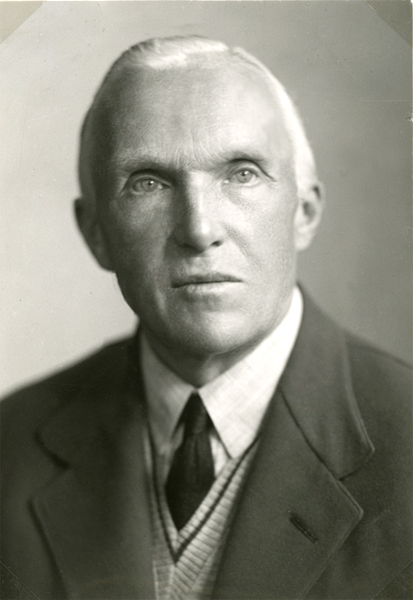
- Clarence von Rosen
- Born: 12 May 1867; Stockholm, Sweden
- Died: 12 August 1955 (aged 88)
- Occupations: athlete, military office

Count Carl Clarence von Rosen (12 May 1867 – 12 August 1955) was a Swedish athlete, military officer, and Crown Equerry to the King of Sweden. He became a member of the International Olympic Committee in 1900, and was credited for the re-introduction of Equestrian at the Summer Olympics after it was dropped at the 1904 Olympic Games. He competed in many sports, such as bandy (which he introduced to Sweden), ice hockey, football, lawn tennis and ice skating.

In 1900, he founded the sports newspaper Nordiskt Idrottslif which became the leading sports newspaper in Sweden during its existence.

Von Rosen was the brother of Count Eric von Rosen. During the 1930s, Clarence and his brother played a leading role in the Swedish upper class Nazi movement, the National Socialist Bloc.

Von Rosen was the first chairman of the Swedish Football Association. In honour of his name, the champions of Swedish football were each year between 1904 and 2000 awarded the von Rosens pokal (English: von Rosen's cup). However, in 2000, after the rediscovery (it was news in the early 1920s) that Eric von Rosen's wife's sister had married the later infamous Nazi leader Hermann Göring during his years in Sweden, the trophy was replaced by Lennart Johanssons Pokal, but without any allegations against the entire von Rosen family.
