= Centralföreningen för Gymnastik- och Idrottssällskapen i Göteborg =

Swedish sports organization

Centralföreningen för Gymnastik- och Idrottssällskapen i Göteborg (Swedish: The Central Organisation for Gymnastics and Sports Societies in Gothenburg), also shortened to just Centralföreningen, is a Swedish sports organisation founded in 1895. It was founded to support and organise the sports clubs in Gothenburg, but later turned to arranging sports events.

== History ==
Centralföreningen was founded on 16 January 1895 in Gothenburg, initiated by sports pioneer Wilhelm Friberg, as a consequence of a number of meetings held by sports administrators in Gothenburg between 1893 and 1895. It was the first sports umbrella organisation intended to support cooperation between the various Gothenburg sports organisations and clubs. The organisation was the de facto district sports federation for Gothenburg until the Swedish Sports Confederation centralised the district federations in 1906, and Centralföreningen was superseded by Göteborgs Distrikts Idrottsförbund. After the turn of the century, the organisation focused its efforts on arranging sports events.

== Events and awards ==
The first sports event was arranged in 1901, with competitions in cycling, a mile run, 1500 metres and high jump. From 1907 until the 1920s, Centralföreningen also organised a yearly championship in athletics and other sports such as football, wrestling, and tennis. The football championships continued until 1957 under the auspices of the organisation, and was long considered a prestigious event. The long-distance foot race Kungsbackaloppet was first organised in 1898, and is the second oldest long-distance race in the world, behind the Boston Marathon. The original race distance between Kungsbacka and Gothenburg was 27 km (16.8 mi), but has now been shortened to half marathon length. Centralföreningen was the main organiser of the race until 1976, but handed over the responsibility in full to athletics club Solvikingarna in 1978.

A medal of merit awarded to sports leaders in Gothenburg was introduced in 1914, awardees include Wilhelm Friberg (1915), Carl Linde (1939), and Sven Rydell (1953).
