= Göteborgsalliansen =

Swedish football alliance

Göteborgsalliansen is a football alliance created in 1921 by the three Gothenburg-clubs GAIS, IFK Göteborg and Örgryte IS. The clubs were dominating Swedish football at the time and got together to arrange big international games with the best players from each team. Carl Linde became its first chairman. The most notable games were against the Swedish national team in the opening game of the new Gothenburg-stadium Ullevi in 1958, which ended 2–2, and against Real Madrid in front of 47,214 in the attendance. For its 50th anniversary 1971 they invited the Russian Olympic football team, a game in which Eusébio played for Göteborgsalliansen.

In modern era, the alliance is foremost known for sharing the same stadium Gamla Ullevi.
