= Idrottsbladet =

Sports magazine in Sweden (1910–2009)

- Editor: Torsten Tegnér (1915–1957)
- Categories: Sports magazine
- Founded: 1910
- Final issue: 2009
- Country: Sweden
- Based in: Stockholm
- Language: Swedish
- ISSN: 0345-5106
- OCLC: 761115881

Idrottsbladet (Swedish: The Sports Gazette) was a sports magazine which existed between 1910 and 2009 in Stockholm, Sweden. During its lifetime it was the largest sports magazine in Scandinavia.

== History and profile ==
Idrottsbladet was launched in 1910. It was headquartered in Stockholm. Torsten Tegnér was the owner and editor from 1915 to 1957 and continued as editor until 1967. After Tegnér's editorship the magazine began to focus on motorsport and was for some years a member of the Swedish Motorcycle and Snowmobile Association. One of the contributors of the magazine was Carl Linde.

In the 1950s Idrottsbladet was published three times per week. The magazine changed its name to Svensk Motorsport in 2008 and folded in 2009.
