= Lennart Johanssons Pokal =

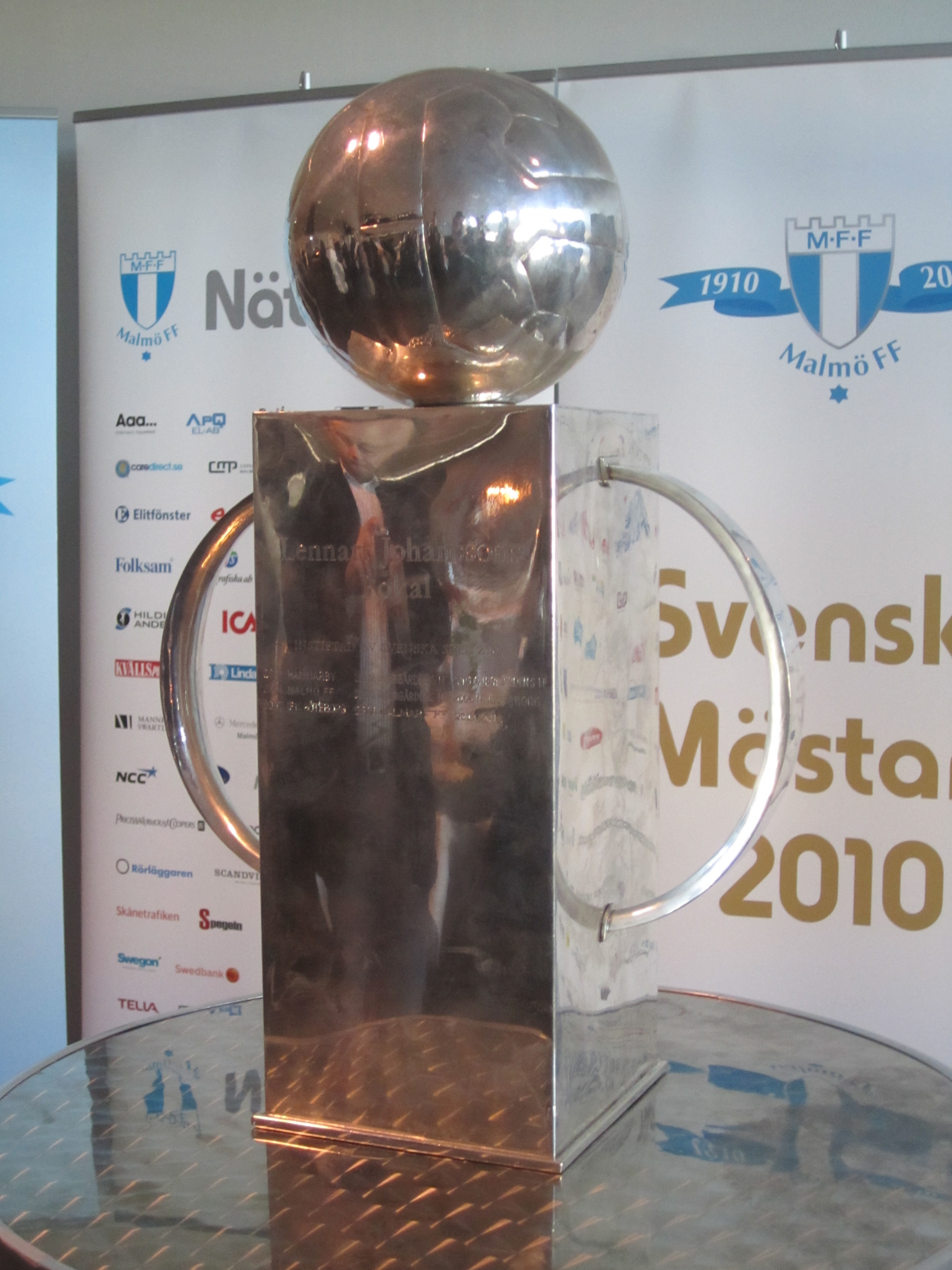
- Lennart Johanssons Pokal
- Awarded for: Winning Allsvenskan and thus becoming Swedish champions
- Presented by: Swedish Football Association
- First award: 2001
- Currently held by: Mjällby AIF (1st title)
- Website: svenskfotboll.se

Lennart Johanssons Pokal is a trophy awarded annually by the Swedish Football Association to the winning team of the Swedish top division, Allsvenskan. The winner of Allsvenskan is also crowned Swedish Champions.

The trophy was introduced in 2001 following media publicity in early November 2000 that Clarence von Rosen, the man after whom the previous trophy was named, had Nazi sympathies during the 1930s. The first club to lift the trophy was Hammarby IF in 2001 and the most recent champions are Mjällby AIF in 2025. Malmö FF have won the trophy the most times (ten).

== The trophy ==
The trophy is made of silver and has a football mounted on a socle with two large handles on each side of the socle. The trophy was designed by Anja Nibbler Kothe and was inspired by a trophy that the Sweden men's national football team had been awarded for winning the gold medal at the 1948 Summer Olympics in London, United Kingdom. The trophy is named after former UEFA president Lennart Johansson, who was in office between 1990 and 2007. The thought behind the trophy was to connect the biggest trophy a Swedish club could win with the biggest Swedish football leader.

== Secret inscription controversy ==
In 2010 Dagens Nyheter published an article in which goldsmith Peter Gustafsson wrote that his old colleague Ingemar Eklund, who made the trophy, had engraved "Bajen Forever" on the inside of the trophy. "Bajen" is the nickname for the first holders of the trophy Hammarby IF. The Swedish football association opened the top of the trophy to see what was engraved on the inside of the trophy. Instead of "Bajen Forever" the words "Djurgården är bäst!" (lit. 'Djurgården are the best!') were found on the inside of the trophy. The chairman of the football association later told the media that the engravings would be removed when the 2010 champions Malmö FF received their engravings on the outside of the trophy.

== Trophy winners ==
Ten teams have lifted the trophy since 2001. Hammarby IF were the first holders of the trophy and Mjällby AIF are the current holders. Malmö FF have held the trophy a record ten times.

Season	Champions (count)
2001	Hammarby IF (1)
2002	Djurgårdens IF (1)
2003	Djurgårdens IF (2)
2004	Malmö FF (1)
2005	Djurgårdens IF (3)
2006	IF Elfsborg (1)
2007	IFK Göteborg (1)
2008	Kalmar FF (1)
2009	AIK (1)
2010	Malmö FF (2)
2011	Helsingborgs IF (1)
2012	IF Elfsborg (2)
2013	Malmö FF (3)

Season	Champions (count)
2014	Malmö FF (4)
2015	IFK Norrköping (1)
2016	Malmö FF (5)
2017	Malmö FF (6)
2018	AIK (2)
2019	Djurgårdens IF (4)
2020	Malmö FF (7)
2021	Malmö FF (8)
2022	BK Häcken (1)
2023	Malmö FF (9)
2024	Malmö FF (10)
2025	Mjällby AIF (1)
