= Hugo Levin =

Swedish footballer (1886–1918)

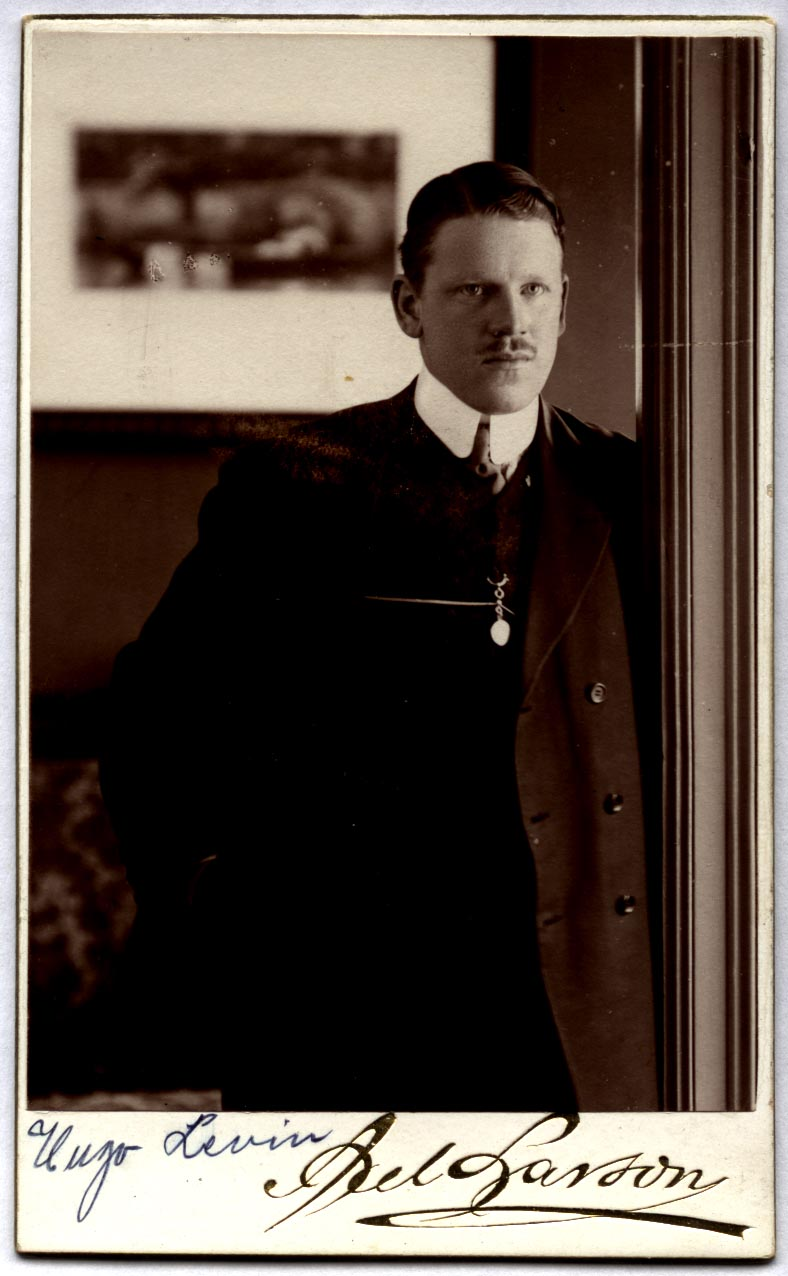

Personal information
- Full name: Johan Hugo Levin
- Date of birth: 2 January 1886
- Place of birth: Ljungarum, Jönköping County, Sweden
- Date of death: 26 October 1918 (aged 32)
- Place of death: Gothenburg, Sweden

Johan Hugo Levin (2 January 1886 – 26 October 1918) was a Swedish athlete, football player and sports administrator. Hugo Levin served in numerous sports organisations and was one of the initiators to the construction of the Gamla Ullevi stadium in Gothenburg.

== Biography ==
In 1899 Levin became a member i Örgryte Idrottssällskap (ÖIS). In 1902, at the age of 16, Levin became secretary of the board of ÖIS and joined the ÖIS 1st team that eventually went on to become Swedish football champions three consecutive seasons (1904 to 1906).

In 1905, Levin was elected secretary of Göteborgs Fotbollsförbund, which he was later the President of from 1912 until his death in 1918. During the 1912 Summer Olympics in Stockholm, Levin served as the Assistant Technical Delegate for the athletics competition. In 1914, he was elected onto the Executive Board of the Swedish Football Association. Levin was also actively involved in Svenska Idrottsförbundet and the Swedish Sports Confederation (Riksidrottsförbundet), which later also appointed him as a member to what was then its highest organizational body ("Överstyrelsen").

A football match against Denmark in the Gamla Ullevi stadium on 20 October 1918 was Hugo Levin's last sporting event. Suffering from a high fever and being largely bedbound, Levin nonetheless attended the match to welcome honorary guest crown prince Gustav Adolf. Levin died on 26 October 1918 from bilateral pneumonia in the 1918 flu pandemic.

== Memory ==
In memory of Hugo Levin, a street to the East of the Nya Ullevi stadium was named Hugo Levins Väg in 1982.

On 14 July 2013, Hugo Levin was posthumously introduced into the Gothenburg Sports Hall of Fame.

On 9 August 2015, a prize in memory of Hugo Levin entitled "HugoLevinPriset" was awarded in Liseberg, Gothenburg for the first time. The award will be given annually to one young leader, coach or administrator in Sports for outstanding service, dedication and leadership in service of Swedish sports.
