= Nordiskt Idrottslif =

- Founder(s): Clarence von Rosen
- Founded: 1900
- Language: Swedish
- Ceased publication: 1920
- Headquarters: Stockholm

Nordiskt Idrottslif ("Nordic Sporting Life") was a Swedish newspaper devoted to sports, published in Stockholm from 1900 to 1920. It was founded by Clarence von Rosen as a spin off of the sports newspaper Ny Tidning för Idrott and was the leading Swedish sports newspaper during its existence, with a focus on football, athletics, swimming and winter sports. It was published once a week until 1906, and twice weekly thereafter. The newspaper was used as the official means of announcement for the Swedish Sports Confederation.
