= Torsten Tegnér =

Swedish athlete and journalist

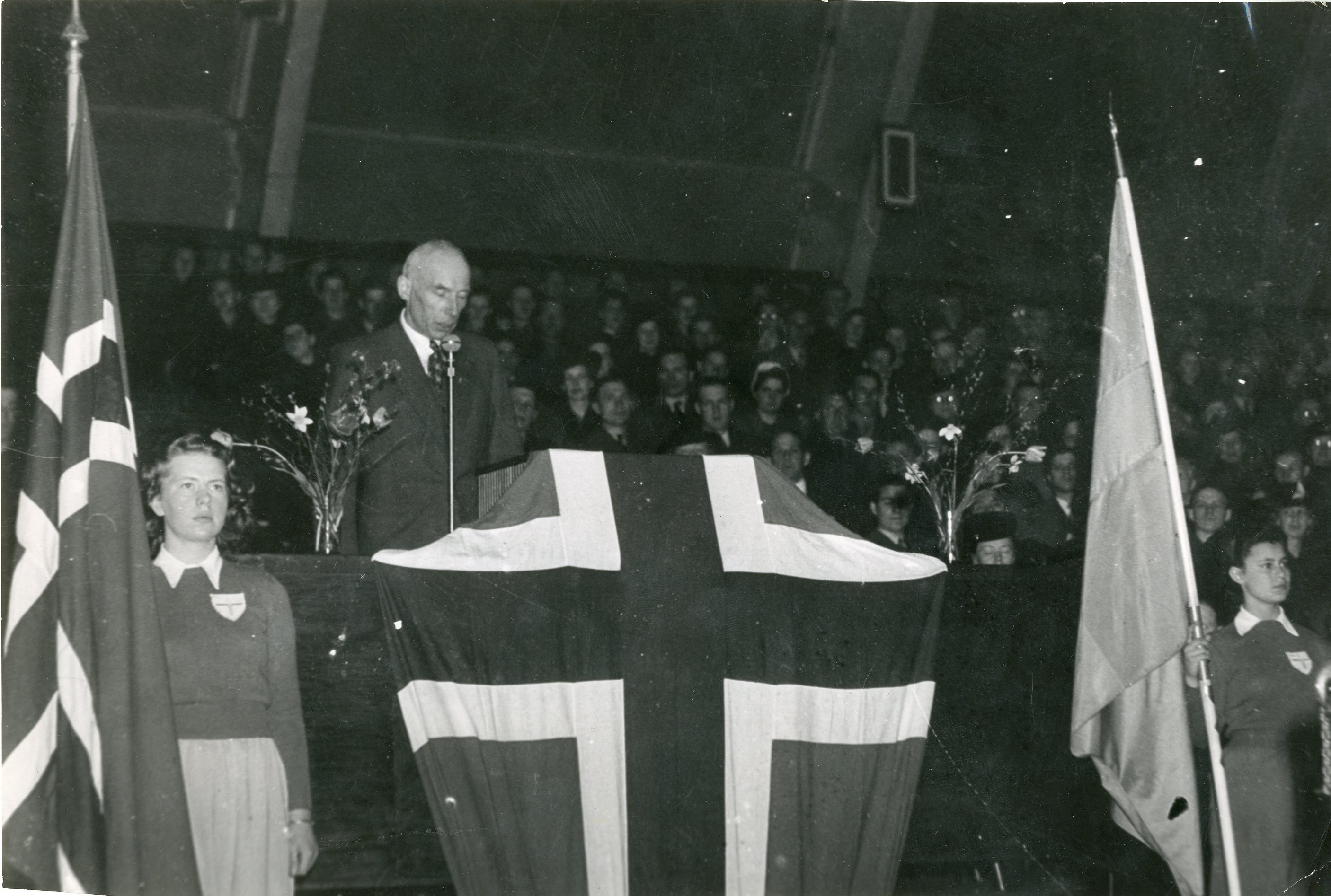
- Torsten Tegnér delivering a speech for Norwegian refugees during the Second World War
- Born: 6 December 1888; Stockholm, Sweden
- Died: 10 June 1977 (aged 88)

Torsten Tegnér (6 December 1888 – 10 June 1977) was a Swedish athlete and journalist, son of composer Alice Tegnér. He was owner of the sports magazine Idrottsbladet between 1915 and 1957. He continued to edit the magazine until 1967.
