= Idrottsarvet =

Swedish sports magazine

Idrottsarvet: årets bok
- Editor: Bo K. Karlsson
- Categories: Sports
- Frequency: Yearly
- Publisher: Sports Museum of Gothenburg
- First issue: 1986
- Country: Sweden
- Based in: Gothenburg
- Language: Swedish
- Website: http://www.idrottsmuseet.se/sidor/idrottsarvet.htm
- ISSN: 0283-1791

Idrottsarvet: årets bok (en: Sports Heritage: Year Book) (ISSN 0283-1791) is a Swedish sport yearbook established in 1986. It is published annually by the Sports Museum of Gothenburg (Idrottsmuseet i Göteborg), and edited by Bo W. Karlsson.
