= Mary von Rosen =

Swedish Lutheran religious worker

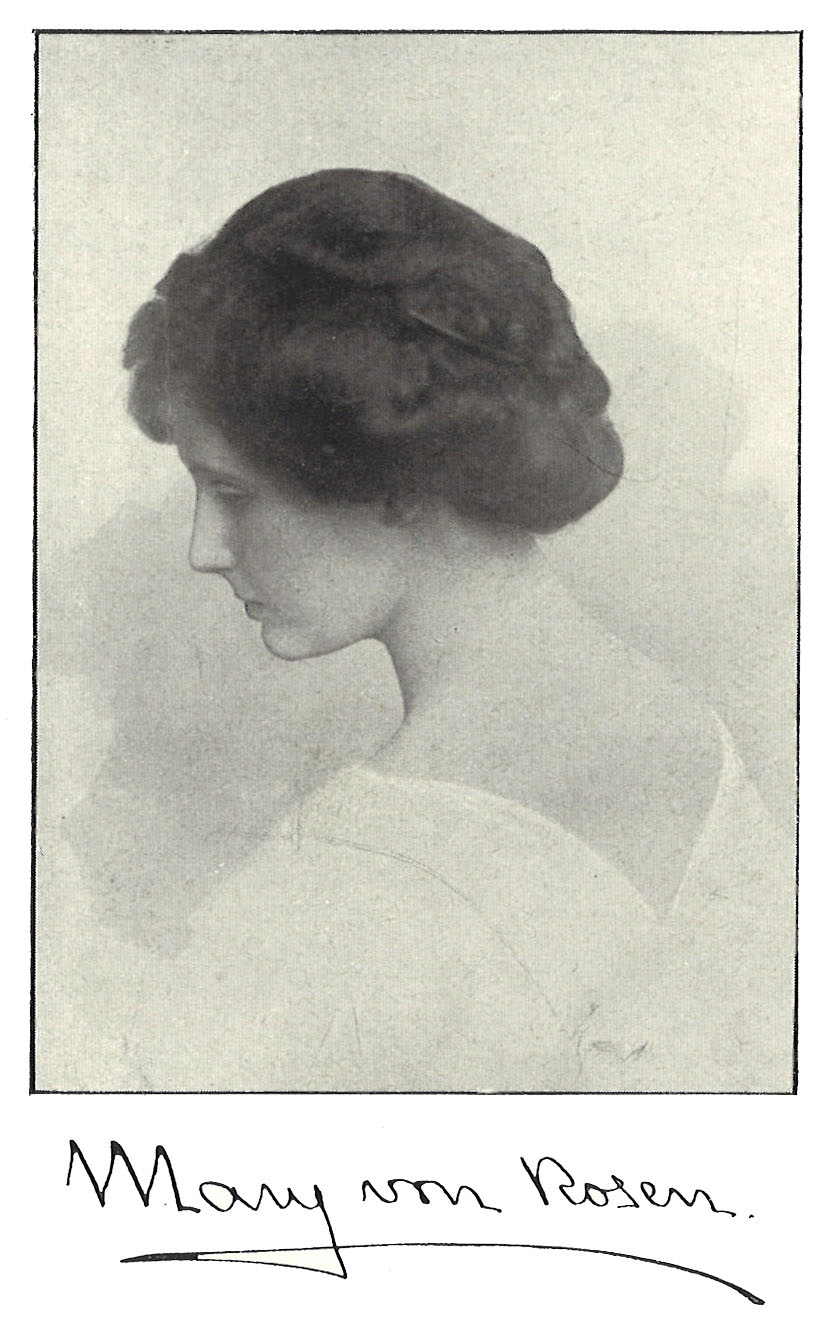
Mary von Rosen around 1910.

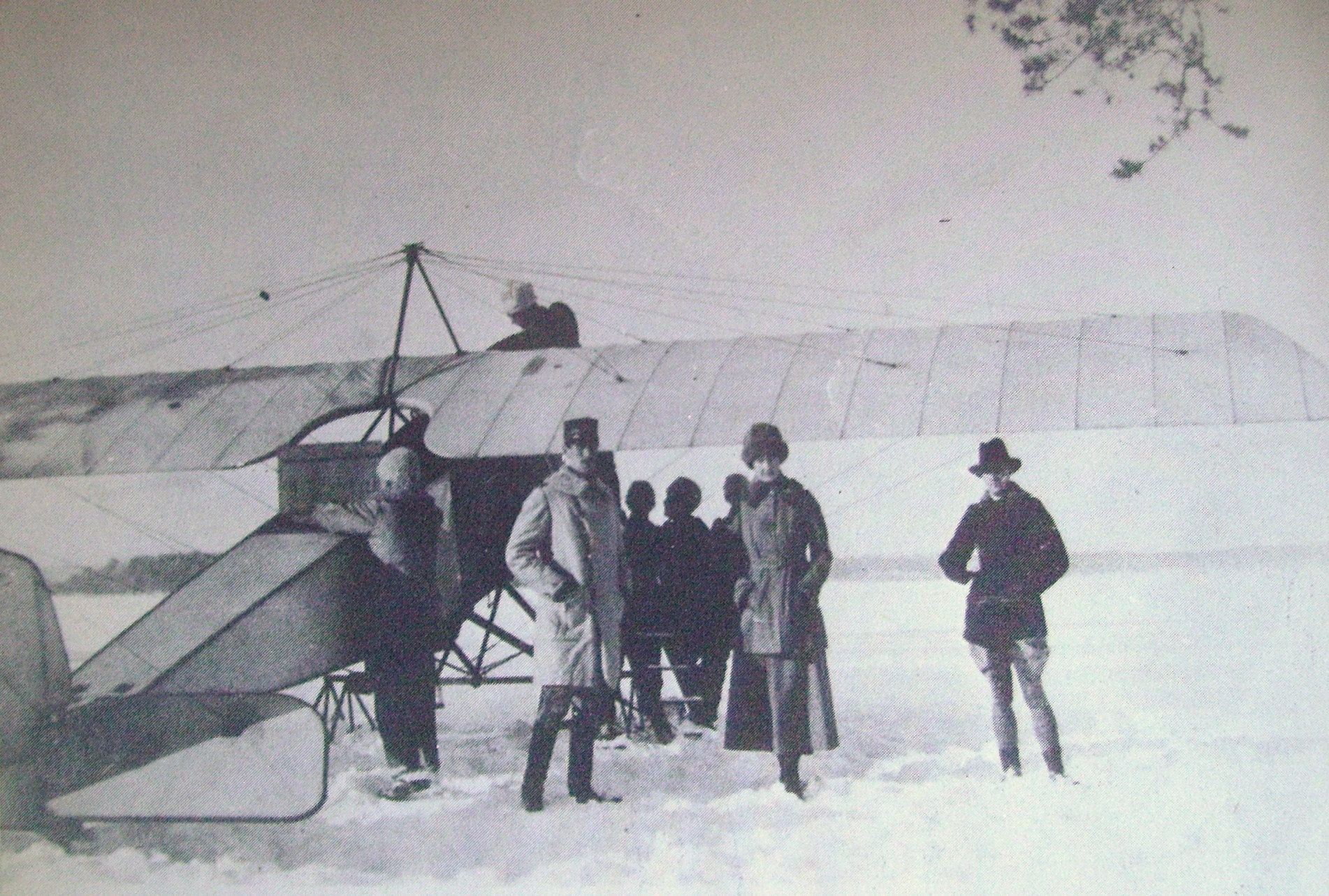
Nils Kindberg, Mary and Eric von Rosen in Umeå near a Thulin D plane, 1918.

Countess Mary von Rosen (née Fock; 5 February 1886 – 26 February 1967) was a Swedish Lutheran religious worker.

She was born in Sweden. She was the third of the five daughters of Baron Carl Alexander Fock and Huldine Fock (née Beamish) and the elder sister of Carin Göring, the first wife of Hermann Göring. She was married to Count Eric von Rosen, with whom she had six children: Bjorn (born 1905), Mary (born 1906), Carl Gustaf von Rosen (born 1909), Birgitta (born 1913), Egil (born 1919), and Anna (born 1926).

In 1932 her daughter Mary married Nils Silfverskiöld, an Olympic gymnast and orthopedic surgeon with strong anti-Nazi views. Her family had good relations with Nazi Germany in general and with Hermann Göring in particular. This resulted in a scandal at the wedding of Silfverskiöld and von Rosen, when all the attendants but the groom and bride made the Nazi salute to Göring. Silfverskiöld and von Rosen had a daughter Monica Getz, a diplomat, educator and activist and the wife of American jazz saxophonist Stan Getz.

Mary von Rosen was one of the founders of the Societas Sanctae Birgittae (SSB), a Lutheran High Church society in Church of Sweden, and she was the first Mother Superior of SSB from 1920 to 1964. Mary von Rosen died three weeks after her 81st birthday, on February 26, 1967.
