= John Pettersson (football manager) =

Swedish football chairman and manager

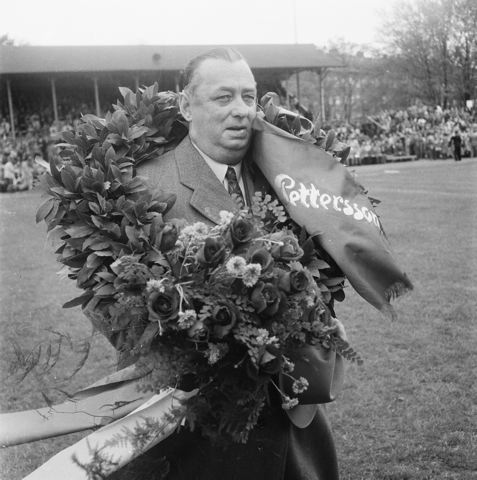
- Pettersson pictured on 15 May 1949

Personal information
- Full name: John Albin Pettersson
- Date of birth: 11 September 1886
- Place of birth: Halmstad, Sweden
- Date of death: 12 October 1951 (aged 65)
- Place of death: Helsingborg, Sweden

Managerial career
- Years: Team
- 1921–1936: Sweden

John Albin Pettersson (11 September 1886 – 12 October 1951) was a Swedish football chairman and manager.

== Career ==
In 1910, at the age of 22, Pettersson became chairman of Helsingborgs IF, a post he held until his death in 1951. In 1917, Pettersson joined the board of the Swedish Football Association, becoming chairman in 1921. As a result of his chairmanship of the Swedish Football Association, Pettersson also became de facto manager of Sweden, managing 138 games over the course of 15 years. Whilst in his role at the Swedish Football Association, Pettersson was also instrumental in the formation of the Allsvenskan.

Additionally, Pettersson worked as a sports journalist at Dagens Nyheter and Helsingborgs Dagblad during his career.

In 2014, Pettersson was added to the Swedish Football Hall of Fame.

== Managerial statistics ==
Team	From	To	Record				
Team	From	To	G	W	D	L	Win %
Sweden	26 March 1921	27 September 1936	138	73	21	44	52.90
