= Anton Johanson =

Swedish footballer (1877–1952)

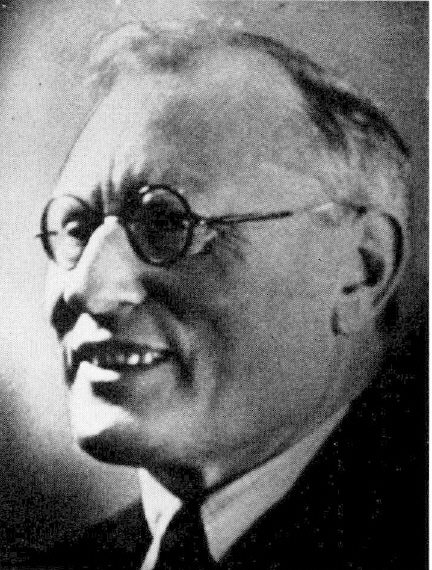

Personal information
- Date of birth: 28 January 1877
- Place of birth: Köping, Sweden
- Date of death: 24 December 1952 (aged 75)
- Place of death: Bromma, Sweden

Anton Johanson (sometimes spelled Johansson) (28 January 1877 – 24 December 1952) was a Swedish football player and manager as well as a pioneer in Swedish football. He played for IFK Köping and IFK Stockholm during his career. He was one of the founders of the Swedish Football Association, of which he also was secretary from 1905 to 1922 and chairman from 1923 to 1937. He was part of the FIFA board from 1932 to 1938.
