= List of Hammarby Fotboll players =

This list is about Hammarby IF players with at least 100 league appearances, or at least 40 league goals. For players with fewer appearances, see List of Hammarby Fotboll players (50–99 appearances). For a list of all Hammarby IF players with a Wikipedia article, see Category:Hammarby Fotboll players. For the current Hammarby IF first-team squad, see First-team squad.

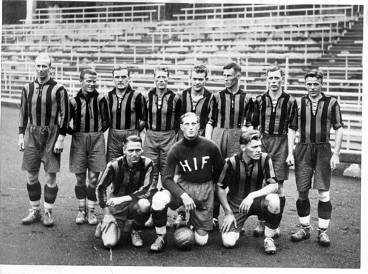
Hammarby Fotboll's first team squad in 1934

Hammarby IF Fotbollförening, commonly known as Hammarby Fotboll, is a Swedish professional football club founded in 1915 and based in Stockholm. The club is affiliated with Stockholms Fotbollförbund (The Stockholm Football Association), and plays its home games at 3Arena.

The club is placed 12th in the all-time Allsvenskan table, the Swedish first league, and has won the domestic championship title once, in 2001. (Note: The title of "Swedish Champions" has been awarded to the winner of four different competitions over the years. Between 1896 and 1925 the title was awarded to the winner of Svenska Mästerskapet, a stand-alone cup tournament. No club were given the title between 1926 and 1930 even though the first-tier league Allsvenskan was played. In 1931 the title was reinstated and awarded to the winner of Allsvenskan. Between 1982 and 1990 a play-off in cup format was held at the end of the league season to decide the champions. After the play-off format in 1991 and 1992 the title was decided by the winner of Mästerskapsserien, an additional league after the end of Allsvenskan. Since the 1993 season the title has once again been awarded to the winner of Allsvenskan.)

Midfielder Kenneth Ohlsson is the player with the most league appearances in the club's history, having made 396 appearances between 1966 and 1983, scoring 82 goals. Forward Billy Ohlsson, his brother, is the player who has scored the most league goals for Hammarby IF, with 94 goals in 217 matches between 1972–1978 and 1980–1986.

== Key ==
General

- League appearances and goals are for first-team competitive league matches only, including Allsvenskan, Svenska Serien, Superettan, Division 1, Division 2, Division 3 and Division 4 matches. Qualification and play-off matches are included, as well as substitute appearances.
- Players are listed according to the total number of league games played, the player with the most goals scored is ranked higher if two or more players are tied.

Table headers

- Nationality – If a player played international football, the country/countries he played for are shown. Otherwise, the player's nationality is given as their country of birth.
- Hammarby Fotboll career – The year of the player's first appearance for Hammarby Fotboll to the year of his last appearance.
- League appearances – The number of games played in league competition.
- League goals – The number of goals scored in league competition.

Symbols key
Colour	Meaning
	Hammarby Fotboll player in the 2025 season
	Player holds club record(s)

== Players ==
=== Appearances ===
Statistics correct as of matches played 12 November 2023.

==== 300+ appearances ====
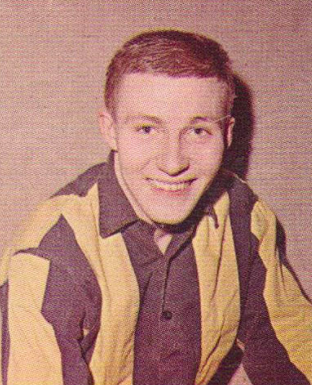
Kenneth "Kenta" Ohlsson

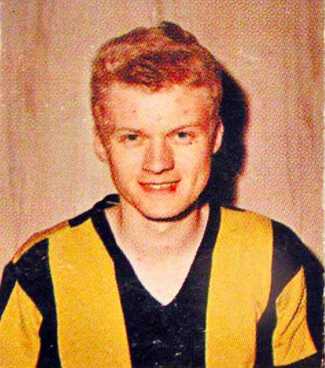
Tom Turesson

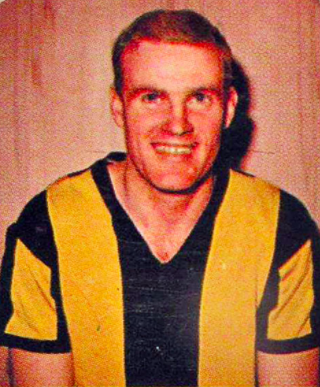
Karl-Evert "Ya" Skoglund

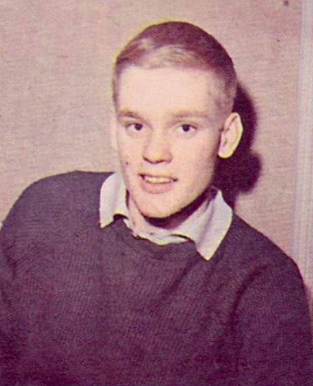
Ronnie Hellström

Player	Position	Hammarby IF career	League appearances	League goals	Notes
(Sweden) Kenneth Ohlsson	MF	1966–1983	396	82	(Note: Kenneth Ohlsson holds the club record for most league appearances in total (396).)
(Sweden) Klas Johansson	DF	1975–1989	312	6	
(Sweden) Mikael Hellström	MF	1990–2005	301	18	

==== 200+ appearances ====
Player	Position	Hammarby IF career	League appearances	League goals	Notes
(Sweden) Tom Turesson	FW	1961–1968; 1970–1976	282	88	
(Sweden) Kennedy Bakircioglu	MF	1999–2003; 2012–2018	269	79	(Note: Kennedy Bakircioglu is the only player who have had his number (10) retired at the club.)
(Sweden) Mats Werner	DF / FW	1971–1984	251	46	
(Sweden) Sten-Ove Ramberg	MF	1978–1989	250	14	
(Sweden) Hans Nell	DF	1950–1965	243	13	
(Sweden) Jan Sjöström	FW	1969–1979	237	81	
(Sweden) Åke Andersson	MF	1937–1951	235	40	
(Sweden) Stig Emanuel Andersson	FW	1933–1949	229	91	
(Sweden) Thom Åhlund	DF	1973–1983	228	9	
(Sweden) Jens Gustafson	MF	1992–2000	219	28	
(Sweden) Billy Ohlsson	FW	1972–1978; 1980–1986	217	94	(Note: Billy Ohlsson holds the club records for most scored league goals in total (94).)
(Sweden) Michael Andersson	MF	1976–1985; 1989–1991	216	39	
(Sweden) Sven Bergqvist	GK	1932–1934; 1935–1947	212	0	
(Sweden) Karl-Evert Skoglund	FW	1956–1966	210	80	
(Sweden) Bertil Lundell	DF	1929–1941	210	0	
(Sweden) Per Fahlström	GK	1990–1998	202	0	

==== 150+ appearances ====
Player	Position	Hammarby IF career	League appearances	League goals	Notes
(Sweden) Leif Strandh	FW	1985–1990; 1992–1997	197	42	
(Sweden) Inge Persson	MF	1958–1973	189	22	
(Sweden) Björn Löf	DF	1962–1972	188	1	
(Sweden) Folke Adamsson	MF	1931–1943	187	46	
(Sweden) Hans Eskilsson	FW	1987–1988; 1992–1995; 1996–2001	185	59	
(Sweden) Nahir Besara	MF	2013–2015; 2022–	184	63	
(Sweden) Johan Hammarström	MF	1987–1996	181	14	
(Sweden) Ulf Eriksson	MF	1979–1983; 1985–1989	176	55	
(Sweden) Mikael Andersson	FW	1998–2005	175	27	
(Sweden) Mats Wahlberg	MF	1979–1989	172	31	
(Sweden) Olle Nyström	DF	1950–1959	171	0	
(Sweden) Ronnie Hellström	GK	1966–1974	171	0	(Note: Ronnie Hellström is the only player to ever have won Guldbollen (a prize given to the best male Swedish footballer each year) during a tenure at the club (in 1971).)
(Denmark) Mads Fenger	DF	2017–2024	171	6	
(Sweden) David Johansson	DF	2004–2011	168	7	
(Sweden) Gösta Lundell	MF	1955–1965	167	3	
(Sweden) Suleyman Sleyman	DF	1998–2008	167	1	
(Sweden) Berndt Westerlund	MF	1952–1963	162	35	
(Sweden) Thomas Lundin	FW	1983–1991	160	63	
(Sweden) Sture Gillström	MF	1925–1933; 1934–1936	159	72	
(Sweden) Aldor Eriksson	MF	1950–1961	158	13	
(Sweden) Thomas Dennerby	MF	1977–1985	157	8	
(Sweden) Johannes Hopf	GK	2008–2015	156	0	
(Sweden) Peter Gerhardsson	FW	1978–1987	152	49	
(Sweden) Lars Wretman	GK	1951–1961	151	0	
(Sweden) Lars Boman	MF	1954–1962	150	46	
(Sweden) Peter Hautalahti	DF	1985–1993	150	4	

==== 100+ appearances ====
Player	Position	Hammarby IF career	League appearances	League goals	Notes
(Sweden) Peter Berggren	MF	1993–1998	149	24	
(Denmark) Jeppe Andersen	MF	2017–2022	148	6	
(Sweden) Sven Lindberg	GK	1960–1966; 1970	147	0	
(Sweden) Folke Holmberg	FW	1946–1951; 1953–1957	143	89	
(Sweden) Axel Ericsson	MF	1951–1954; 1957–1962; 1963	140	46	
(Sweden) Per Holmberg	MF	1979–1987	140	11	
(Sweden) Sebastian Castro-Tello	MF	2006–2013	139	19	
(Sweden) Björn Hedenström	DF	1976–1984	139	10	
(Sweden) Arne Larsson	DF	1957–1965	138	3	
(Sweden) José Monteiro de Macedo	DF	2006–2012	138	1	
(Sweden) Gunnar Wilhelmsson	GK	1975–1980	137	0	
(Sweden) Valter Andersson	DF	1947–1956	135	0	
(Sweden) Oscar Schirmer	DF	1930–1940	132	2	
(Sweden) Pablo Piñones Arce	FW	2001–2007; 2014–2015	130	30	
(Sweden) Mikael Rönnberg	MF	1976–1982; 1987–1990	130	10	
(Sweden) Sigfrid Öberg	FW	1925–1935	124	54	
(Sweden) Lars Eriksson	GK	1985–1988; 1998–2001	123	0	
(Sweden) Max von Schlebrügge	DF	2002–2007; 2011–2013	122	11	
(Sweden) Simon Sandberg	DF	2018–2022	122	1	
(Sweden) Åke Hallberg	FW	1926–1934	121	52	
(Australia) Ante Covic	GK	2002–2006	121	0	
(Sweden) Christer Fursth	MF	1998–2003	120	6	
(Sweden) Johan Andersson	DF	1998–2004	118	10	
(Iceland) Pétur Marteinsson	DF	1996–1998; 2003–2006	118	9	
(Sweden) Jan Svensson	MF	1974–1979	117	0	
(Sweden) Lars-Ove Johansson	FW	1956–1964	116	65	
(Sweden) Lennart Skoglund	FW	1946–1949; 1964–1967	113	28	(Note: Lennart Skoglund is one of only two Hammarby players (together with Ronnie Hellström) that have been inducted as a member of the Swedish football Hall of Fame.)
(Sweden) Magnus Lefvert	DF	1988–1995	113	5	
(Denmark) Mikkel Jensen	MF	2003–2009	112	2	
(Sweden) Holger Nurmela	FW	1939–1950	111	77	
(Sweden) Rune Larsson	FW	1953–1958	111	64	
(Norway) Mats Solheim	DF	2015–2019	111	8	
(Sweden) Darijan Bojanić	MF	2019–2022	110	9	
(Sweden) Jonas Stark	DF	1999–2004	110	6	
(Sweden) Sulo Vaattovaara	DF	1983–1987	109	9	
(Sweden) Tomas Turesson	FW	1983–1990	105	12	
(Sweden) Petter Andersson	MF	2003–2008; 2016	103	21	
(Sweden) Helge Andersson	DF	1923–1929	103	0	
(Sweden) Björn Carlswärd	DF	1966–1974	102	3	
(Sweden) Ragnar Blom	DF	1943–1946; 1950–1954	102	1	
(Sweden) Oscar Björnlund	DF	1930–1939	102	0	
(Sweden) Michael Möller	DF	1992–1996	101	2	
(Sweden) Imad Khalili	MF	2015–2021	100	16	

=== Goals ===
==== 40+ goals ====
This is a list of players with less than 100 league appearances that scored at least 40 league goals for Hammarby.

Player	Position	Hammarby IF career	League appearances	League goals	Notes
(Sweden) Kurt Kjellström	FW	1941–1947	89	85	
(Sweden) Bertil Bäckvall	MF	1940–1946	99	48	
(Sweden) Rolf Andersson	FW	1967–1969	47	46	
(Sweden) Bernt Lif	FW	1962–1966	76	46	
(Sweden) Axel Nilsson	MF	1925–1932	93	46	
(Sweden) Lars Nordin	FW	1961–1965	90	43	

== Notable club captains ==
Club captains
Name	Nationality	Position	Dates	Notes
Gösta Wihlborg	Sweden	DF	1922–1924	First known club captain.
Mikael Hellström	Sweden	DF	1999–2000	–
Lars Eriksson	Sweden	GK	2001	First domestic league-winning club captain.
Mikael Hellström	Sweden	DF	2002	—
Mikkel Jensen	Denmark	MF	2003–2009	First non-Swedish club captain.
Kennedy Bakircioglu	Sweden	MF	2013–2018	—
