= List of Allsvenskan players =

This is a list of Allsvenskan players who have made 200 or more appearances in Allsvenskan. Current Allsvenskan players are shown in blue.

Most matches has Sven Andersson played, 431 matches and most goals has Sven Jonasson, with 254 goals.

== Players ==
Matches of current Allsvenskan players as of 22 January 2015.

Player	Nationality	Pos.	Apps	Goals	Club(s)	Years
Sven Andersson	Sweden	GK	431	0	Örgryte, Helsingborg	1981–2001
Thomas Ravelli	Sweden	GK	416	0	Öster, IFK Göteborg	1978–1997
Daniel Tjernström	Sweden	MF	411	24	Örebro, Degerfors, AIK	1993–2013
Sven Jonasson	Sweden	FW	410	254	Elfsborg	1927–1947
Bengt Andersson	Sweden	GK	387	3	Brage, Örgryte, IFK Göteborg	1986–2009
Magnus Erlingmark	Sweden	DF	380	53	Örebro, IFK Göteborg	1989–2004
Tommy Jönsson	Sweden	DF	367	32	Malmö FF, Halmstad	1994–2010
Björn Nordqvist	Sweden	DF	361	7	Norrköping, IFK Göteborg, Örgryte	1961–1983
Sulo Vaattovaara	Sweden	DF	351	22	Hammarby, Norrköping	1983–1997
Kalle Svensson	Sweden	GK	349	0	Helsingborg	
Bengt Berndtsson	Sweden	MF	348	69	IFK Göteborg	1951–1967
Krister Kristensson	Sweden	DF	348	6	Malmö FF	1963–1979
Lars Zetterlund	Sweden	MF	348	33	AIK, IFK Norrköping, Örebro	1982–2001
Stefan Selaković	Sweden	MF	348	83	Halmstad, IFK Göteborg	1996–2013
Karl-Erik Grahn	Sweden	MF	346		Elfsborg	
Roland Andersson	Sweden	DF	344	13	Malmö FF, Djurgården	1968–1983
Christoffer Andersson	Sweden	DF	343	41	Helsingborg	1997–
Anders Svensson	Sweden	MF	342	58	Elfsborg	1997–
Kenneth Ohlsson	Sweden	MF	342	58	Hammarby	1966–1983
Leif Målberg	Sweden	DF	337	8	Elfsborg	1965–1980
Claes Cronqvist	Sweden	DF	336	55	Djurgården, Landskrona	1966–1980
Sven Dahlkvist	Sweden	DF	331	45	AIK, Örebro	1975–1992
Erik Nilsson	Sweden	DF	326	1	Malmö FF	1934–1953
Håkan Svensson	Sweden	GK	322	0	Halmstad, AIK, Elfsborg, Häcken, Malmö FF	1990–2006
Mattias Asper	Sweden	GK	324	1	AIK, Malmö FF, Brommapojkarna, Mjällby	1998–
Gustav Sjöberg	Sweden	GK	321	0	AIK	
Roy Andersson	Sweden	DF	317	21	Malmö FF	1968–1983
Jan Möller	Sweden	GK	314	1	Malmö FF, Trelleborg	1972–1992
Olle Åhlund	Sweden	MF	312		Degerfors	
Sven Lindman	Sweden	MF	312	49	Djurgården	1965–1980
Hans Eklund	Sweden	FW	312	125	Öster, Helsingborg	1987–2003
Mikael Nilsson	Sweden	DF	306	21	IFK Göteborg	1988–2000
Torbjörn Arvidsson	Sweden	DF	306	22	Halmstad	1989–2005
Tore Keller	Sweden	FW	305	150	Sleipner	1924–1940
Åke Johansson	Sweden	DF	305	1	Norrköping	1950–1965
Lars Eriksson	Sweden	GK	305	0	Hammarby, Norrköping	1986–2001
Bo Larsson	Sweden	FW	302	119	Malmö FF	1962–1979
Gösta Sandberg	Sweden	FW	300	70	Djurgården	1951–1966
René Makondele	DR Congo	FW	299	69	Djurgården, Gefle, Helsingborg, Häcken	2002–
Christer Fursth	Sweden	MF	298	28	Örebro, Helsingborg, Hammarby	1989–2003
Markus Johannesson	Sweden	DF	297	12	Örgryte, Djurgården	1997–2009
Teddy Lučić	Sweden	DF	295	16	Västra Frölunda, IFK Göteborg, AIK, Häcken, Elfsborg	1993–2010
Mathias Florén	Sweden	DF	293	8	Norrköping, Elfsborg	1997–
Daniel Andersson	Sweden	MF	292	30	Malmö FF	1995–2013
Harry Bild	Sweden	FW	290	162	Norrköping, Öster	1956–1973
Niclas Alexandersson	Sweden	MF	289	49	Halmstad, IFK Göteborg	1989–2008
Klas Johansson	Sweden	DF	288	12	Hammarby	1975–1988
Erik Wahlstedt	Sweden	DF	288	20	IFK Göteborg, Helsingborg	1994–2012
Stefan Ishizaki	Sweden	MF	286	65	AIK, Elfsborg	2000–2013
Ulrik Jansson	Sweden	MF	284	21	Öster, Helsingborg	1986–2003
Torbjörn Persson	Sweden	DF	281	10	Malmö FF	1980–1995
Prawitz Öberg	Sweden	DF	278	34	Malmö FF	1952–1965
David Frölund	Sweden	DF	277	6	Örgryte, Häcken	1999–
Leif Gustafsson	Sweden		276		Elfsborg	1970–1984
Thomas Johansson	Sweden		276		Elfsborg	1973–1983
Mattias Lindström	Sweden	DF	276	48	Helsingborg, GAIS	1997–
Sven-Gunnar Larsson	Sweden	GK	274	0	Örebro	1962–1975
Michael Andersson	Sweden	MF	274	54	Hammarby, IFK Göteborg	1977–1990
Andreas Ravelli	Sweden	DF	271	13	Öster, IFK Göteborg	1977–1992
Jan Hellström	Sweden	FW	272	113	Norrköping, Örgryte	1981–1994
Jonas Henriksson	Sweden	FW	271	48	Häcken, IFK Göteborg	1994–2012
Arvid Emanuelsson	Sweden		270	21	Elfsborg	1933–1947
Samuel Wowoah	Sweden	MF	270	21	Örebro, Djurgården, Halmstad, IFK Göteborg	1995–2012
Knut Kroon	Sweden	FW	269	141	Helsingborg	1925–1941
Anders Ljungberg	Sweden	MF	269	44	Malmö FF, Åtvidaberg, Landskrona	1967–1980
Göran Göransson	Sweden	MF	268	12	AIK	
Tommy Berggren	Sweden	FW	268	49	Djurgården	1970–1981
Bertil Johansson	Sweden	FW	267	162	IFK Göteborg	1955–1968
Thomas Nordahl	Sweden	MF	266	100	Degerfors, Örebro	1964–1978
Jörgen Ohlsson	Sweden	DF	266	34	Malmö FF	1991–2003
Helge Bengtsson	Sweden	GK	265	3	Malmö FF	1934–1951
Magnus Andersson	Sweden	DF	265	12	Malmö FF	1975–1988
Johan Karlsson	Sweden	DF	263	7	Elfsborg	2001–2011
Andreas Klarström	Sweden	DF	262	18	Elfsborg	1997–
Niclas Sjöstedt	Sweden	DF	261		Örgryte	1987–2000
Kristian Bergström	Sweden	MF	261	32	Norrköping, Malmö FF, Åtvidaberg	1998–
Carl-Erik Holmberg	Sweden	FW	260	194	Örgryte	1981–2001
Göran Ahlström	Sweden		258		Elfsborg	1969–1981
Daniel Sjölund	Finland	MF	256	33	Djurgården, Åtvidaberg	2003–
Thomas Wernersson	Sweden	GK	254	0	Åtvidaberg, IFK Göteborg	1975–1987
Morgan Nilsson	Sweden	DF	254	14	GAIS, Örgryte	1990–2002
Mattias Jonson	Sweden	FW	254	69	Örebro, Helsingborg, Djurgården	1993–2011
Göran Hagberg	Sweden	GK	252	0	Öster, AIK	1969–1982
Curt Olsberg	Sweden	MF	251	53	Malmö FF, Djurgården	1967–1979
Mats Werner	Sweden	DF	251	46	Hammarby	1971–1984
Jonnie Fedel	Sweden	GK	251	0	Malmö FF	1984–1999
Mattias Hugosson	Sweden	GK	251	0	Gefle	2005–2013
Börje Leander	Sweden	MF	249	25	AIK	
Jonas Wallerstedt	Sweden	FW	249	62	Norrköping, GIF Sundsvall, IFK Göteborg	1995–2008
Tobias Hysén	Sweden	FW	249	87	Häcken, Djurgården, IFK Göteborg	2000–2013
Mikael Martinsson	Sweden	FW	246	70	Djurgården, IFK Göteborg, Elfsborg	1989–2000
Håkan Mild	Sweden	MF	246	26	IFK Göteborg	1989–2005
Jan Sjöström	Sweden	FW	244	85	IFK Göteborg, Hammarby	1966–1979
Jörgen Augustsson	Sweden	DF	244	0	Åtvidaberg, Landskrona	1972–1982
Fredrik Nordback	Finland	MF	244	18	Örebro	1997–2011
Sonny Johansson	Sweden	FW	243	110	Landskrona	1971–1980
Björn Alkeby	Sweden	GK	242	0	Djurgården	1971–1981
Anders Palmér	Sweden	MF	242	29	Malmö FF, Halmstad, Trelleborg	1980–1994
John Alvbåge	Sweden	GK	242	0	Västra Frölunda, Örebro, IFK Göteborg	2000–
Arne Arvidson	Sweden	GK	241	0	Djurgården	1952–1965
Dime Jankulovski	Sweden	GK	241	0	Västra Frölunda, AIK, Örgryte, GAIS	1998–2012
Thomas Ahlström	Sweden	FW	240	102	Elfsborg	1970–1984
Patrik Anttonen	Sweden	MF	240	10	Örebro	1999–2012
Niclas Kindvall	Sweden	FW	239	70	AIK, Norrköping, Malmö FF	1987–1999
Thomas Olsson	Sweden	MF	238	28	Norrköping, Malmö FF, IFK Göteborg	1998–2011
Sten-Ove Ramberg	Sweden	MF	237	14	Hammarby	1978–1988
Stefan Rehn	Sweden	MF	237	44	Djurgården, IFK Göteborg	1986–2002
Daniel Andersson	Sweden	GK	237	0	Trelleborg, AIK, Helsingborg	1998–
Patrik Andersson	Sweden	FW	236	67	Norrköping, Hammarby	1985–2000
Sven Andersson	Sweden	DF	235	28	AIK	
Roland Nilsson	Sweden	DF	235	17	IFK Göteborg, Helsingborg	1983–2000
Petter Wastå	Sweden	GK	235	0	Kalmar	1999–2012
Jesper Jansson	Sweden	DF	234	19	Öster, AIK, Djurgården, Helsingborg	1988–2004
Dick Last	Sweden	GK	232	0	IFK Göteborg, Örgryte	1987–2009
Ingemar Erlandsson	Sweden	DF	230	14	Malmö FF	1976–1987
Hans Bergh	Sweden	MF	230	8	Hammarby, Degerfors, Helsingborg, AIK, GIF Sundsvall	1994–2005
Christoffer Källqvist	Sweden	GK	230	0	Häcken	2000–
Jan Aronsson	Sweden	FW	229	80	Degerfors, Djurgården	1951–1965
Kaj Eskelinen	Sweden	FW	229	61	Västra Frölunda, IFK Göteborg, Djurgården, Hammarby	1989–2000
Louay Chanko	Syria	MF	229	33	Djurgården, Malmö FF, Hammarby, Syrianska	2001–2013
Gunnar Gren	Sweden	FW	228	95	GAIS, Gårda, IFK Göteborg, Örgryte	1936–1964
Thom Åhlund	Sweden	DF	228	9	Hammarby	1973–1983
Andreas Bild	Sweden	MF	228	32	Öster, Hammarby	1991–2001
Hjálmar Jónsson	Iceland	DF	228	6	IFK Göteborg	2002–
Tom Turesson	Sweden	DF	227	49	Hammarby	1961–1976
Gary Sundgren	Sweden	DF	227	12	AIK	1988–2003
Harry Svensson	Sweden	MF	224	62	IFK Göteborg, Djurgården, Västerås	1965–1978
Billy Ohlsson	Sweden	FW	224	97	Hammarby	1972–1986
Jeffrey Aubynn	Sweden	MF	224	24	Halmstad, Örgryte, Hammarby, Malmö FF, GAIS	1998–2012
Sven Rydell	Sweden	MF	223	152	Örgryte, Redbergslid	1924–1934
Erik Persson	Sweden	FW	222	100	AIK	
Mikael Dahlberg	Sweden	FW	221	33	GIF Sundsvall, Djurgården, Gefle	2004–2013
Staffan Tapper	Sweden	MF	220	42	Malmö FF	1967–1979
Tord Holmgren	Sweden	MF	217	22	IFK Göteborg	1977–1987
Lennart Nilsson	Sweden	MF	217	54	Elfsborg, IFK Göteborg	1978–1990
Thomas Lagerlöf	Sweden	DF	216	17	AIK, Brommapojkarna	
Benno Magnusson	Sweden	MF	215	42	Åtvidaberg, Kalmar	1971–1984
Jens Fjellström	Sweden	MF	214	42	Djurgården, Malmö FF	1988–1999
Tommy Holmgren	Sweden	MF	213	18	IFK Göteborg	1977–1989
Mattias Östberg	Sweden	MF	213	16	Norrköping, GAIS, Häcken, Djurgården	1999–2014
Kent Jönsson	Sweden	DF	211	5	Malmö FF	1974–1987
Tomas Žvirgždauskas	Lithuania	DF	211	6	Halmstad	2002–2011
Jan Mattsson	Sweden	FW	210	123	Öster	1969–1984
Andreas Jakobsson	Sweden	DF	210	10	Landskrona, Helsingborg	1994–2007
Suleyman Sleyman	Sweden	DF	210	2	Hammarby, Syrianska	1998–2013
Björn Kindlund	Sweden	DF	208	23	AIK	
Niklas Skoog	Sweden	FW	208	87	Västra Frölunda, Örebro, Malmö FF	1992–2008
Sharbel Touma	Sweden	MF	208	53	Djurgården, AIK, Halmstad, Syrianska	1999–2013
Peter Larsson	Sweden	DF	206	14	Halmstad, IFK Göteborg, AIK	1982–1993
Johan Wiland	Sweden	GK	206	0	Elfsborg	2000–2008
Arne Bryngelsson	Sweden	FW	205	42	Sandviken, Djurgården	1935–1947
Sören Börjesson	Sweden	MF	204	54	Örgryte, Djurgården	1973–1986
Mats Lilienberg	Sweden	FW	204	77	Trelleborg, IFK Göteborg, Malmö FF	1992–2004
Dan Brzokoupil	Sweden	FW	203	49	Djurgården, Landskrona BoIS, Hammarby	1967–1976
