= Berndt Westerlund =

Swedish footballer (1932–2022)

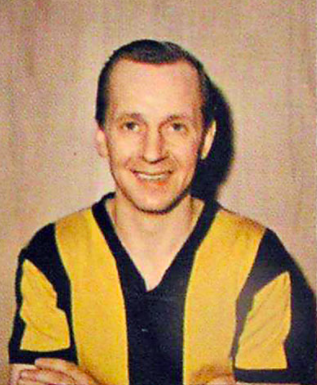
- Westerlund with Hammarby IF in 1963.
- Born: Berndt Westerlund; 27 March 1932; Stockholm, Sweden
- Died: 17 November 2022 (aged 90)
Association football career
- Position: Right winger
Youth career
- –1951: Karlbergs BK
Senior career*
Years	Team	Apps	(Gls)
1952–1963	Hammarby IF	162	(35)
International career
1954–1959	Sweden B	2	(0)
- * Club domestic league appearances and goals
Ice hockey career
- Position: Centre
- Played for: Karlbergs BK / Hammarby IF
- National team: Sweden
- Playing career: 1951–1961

Berndt "Spaden" Westerlund (27 March 1932 – 17 November 2022) was a Swedish football and ice hockey player, best known for representing Hammarby IF in both sports.

== Athletic career ==
=== Football ===
Westerlund was born in Stockholm and started his career with local club Karlbergs BK in the lower divisions. As a youngster, he attracted interest from AIK, but a transfer did not materialise.

In 1952, Westerlund joined Hammarby IF in Division 2, Sweden's second tier. He made his debut for the club in a 2–0 home win against Åtvidabergs FF on 21 September the same year.

Two years later, Hammarby won a promotion to Allsvenskan. He soon established himself as a starting winger for the club in the domestic top tier, getting known for his pace and technique.

In 1957–58, Hammarby spent one season in the second tier, where the team scored an impressive 117 goals in 33 fixtures throughout the campaign, with Westerlund playing an integral part, getting instantly promoted back to Allsvenskan.

Westerlund was a frequent starter for Hammarby in Allsvenskan between 1959 and 1962, forming fruitful partnerships with other offensive players like Karl-Evert Skoglund, Lars-Ove Johansson, Lars Boman and Axel Ericsson.

Westerlund won two caps for the Swedish national B team between 1954 and 1959.

He retired from football in early 1963, aged 31. In total, Westerlund made 162 league appearances for Hammarby, scoring 35 goals.

Westeund died on 17 November 2022, at the age of 90.

=== Hockey ===
As in football, Westerlund started to play hockey with Karlbergs BK as a youngster, before joining Hammarby IF in 1952.

Playing as a centre, he competed in the Swedish top league Division 1 for nine seasons, up until 1961. Westerlund finished as runner-up for the Swedish championship medal in two seasons with the club, 1953 and 1955.

He made two appearances for Sweden throughout his career.
