= Tom Turesson =

Swedish footballer and manager

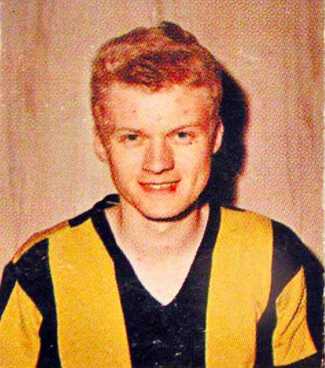
- Turesson with Hammarby in 1963.

Personal information
- Full name: Tom Olov Turesson
- Date of birth: 17 May 1942
- Place of birth: Östervåla, Sweden
- Date of death: 13 December 2004 (aged 62)
- Place of death: Tyresö, Sweden
- Height: 1.84 m (6 ft 0 in)
- Positions: Forward; winger

Youth career
- 1954–1961: IK Rex

Senior career*
Years	Team	Apps	(Gls)
1961–1968	Hammarby IF	143	(65)
1968–1970	Club Brugge	32	(11)
1970–1976	Hammarby IF	139	(23)
Total		314	(99)

International career
1962–1965	Sweden U21	5	(1)
1965–1966	Sweden B	3	(3)
1962–1971	Sweden	22	(9)

Managerial career
- 1978: Hammarby IF
- * Club domestic league appearances and goals

Tom Olov Turesson (17 May 1942 – 13 December 2004) was a Swedish football player and manager, best known for representing Hammarby IF. A full international between 1962 and 1971, he won 22 caps for Sweden and scored 9 goals, taking part in the 1970 FIFA World Cup.

== Early life ==
Born in Östervåla, Turesson grew up in the village of Vendel in Uppland County. He started to play football with local club IK Rex as a youngster.

Turesson attracted interest from both Djurgårdens IF and their rivals Hammarby IF, and chose to join the latter after a successful trial where he impressed manager Folke Adamsson.

== Club career ==
=== Hammarby ===
On 24 September 1961, Turesson scored in his senior debut for Hammarby in Allsvenskan, aged 19, in a 4–2 away win against Örgryte IS. He immediately broke into the squad as a regular, and formed an offensive partnership with players like Karl-Evert Skoglund, Lars Boman and Lars-Ove Johansson, playing all 22 fixtures as Hammarby finished 9th in the table in 1962. Thuresson was, however, unable to save the club from relegation in 1963 despite scoring 7 goals in 20 league appearances.

In 1964, Karl-Evert's brother Lennart "Nacka" Skoglund had returned to Hammarby from a professional career in the Italian Serie A. Hammarby won Division 2 in a remarkable fashion, with Skoglund and Turesson playing on each flank of the pitch as wingers, as the side scored 80 goals in just 22 fixtures. Back in Allsvenskan 1965, Hammarby was unable to produce any sort of challenge and immediately got relegated from the top division, even though Turesson was voted as the best right-winger in the whole league by Sweden's dominating sports magazine Idrottsbladet. He became known as a prolific goalscorer who possessed a great ability to handle the ball.

Back in the second tier in 1966, Turesson decided to stay with Hammarby and once again led the club to a straight promotion, before history repeated itself when Hammarby suffered a relegation from Allsvenskan in 1967. Tired of bouncing up and down the divisions, during a period when Hammarby was considered as a yo-yo club, Turesson sought a move abroad to play professionally. He was on the verge of joining Austria Wien before finally signing a two-year contract with Club Brugge in the summer of 1968.

=== Club Brugge ===
Linking up with compatriot Kurt Axelsson, Turesson established himself as a starter for Club Brugge in the Belgian First Division A season of 1968–69, scoring 7 goals in 22 league games, as the club finished 5th in the table.

In his second season with the club, Turesson lost his place as a regular in favour of Rob Rensenbrink, and only featured in 10 league fixtures. Although, Turesson played a major part as Club Brugge won the Belgian Cup in 1970, scoring four goals in five games throughout the tournament.

=== Return to Hammarby ===
When Turesson's contract with Club Brugge expired in the summer of 1970, he opted to return to Hammarby instead of continuing his career abroad. The club was placed last in the Allvenskan table after eight rounds when he arrived in July, but the winger inspired Hammarby to go practically unbeaten through the rest of the campaign, eventually finishing 5th.

Between 1971 and 1974, Hammarby consistently finished mid-table in Allsvenskan, being unable to produce any sort of challenge for the Swedish champion title. During this period, Turesson was widely regarded as Hammarby's most important player, together with younger talents like Jan Sjöström, Kenneth Ohlsson and Ronnie Hellström. He scored his first goal in a Stockholm derby against rivals AIK, on 27 August 1974, in a 1–0 home win.

In 1975, new manager Björn Bolling decided to re-position Turesson and play him as a libero, a move that proved to become highly successful. At age 33, Turesson revived his footballing career, dictating his teammates thanks to his excellent perception of the game.

At the end of 1976, aged 36, Turesson retired from football. In total, he made 282 league appearances for Hammarby and scored 88 goals. In 2004, Turesson was voted as the club's fifteenth biggest profile throughout its history.

== International career ==
Turesson made his senior debut for Sweden on 16 September 1962, aged 20, in a 2–1 loss against Norway in an away friendly.

In 1966, he broke into the Swedish squad as a regular, after scoring a hat-trick in a 4–2 win against Norway on 18 September. He featured in five of six qualifying games ahead of the UEFA Euro 1968, as Sweden failed to qualify for the main tournament.

Turesson was called up for the 1970 FIFA World Cup, where Sweden got knocked out after the group stage. He scored in Sweden's 1–1 draw against Israel.

== Managerial career ==
Turesson returned to Hammarby IF in 1978, two seasons after his retirement, being appointed as the new manager as the club. Hammarby's chairman Lennart Nyman had been in negotiations, that ultimately came out unsuccessful, with several other possible recruitments before convincing Turesson to take the position.

Hammarby's squad consisted of established key players like Jan Sjöström, Kenneth Ohlsson, Mats Werner and Billy Ohlsson, together with younger talents such as Thomas Dennerby, Klas Johansson, Michael Andersson, Sten-Ove Ramberg, Mikael Rönnberg and Peter Gerhardsson. The club had a tough first half of the season, being involved in the relegation battle, before finally finishing 9th in the table. At the end of the year, Turesson was replaced by Bengt "Julle" Gustavsson.

== Personal life ==
His son Tomas Turesson would also become a professional footballer, representing Hammarby IF between 1983 and 1990.

Turesson died on 13 December 2004, aged 62, due to a chronic kidney disease.

== Career statistics ==
=== International ===
Appearances and goals by national team and year
National team	Year	Apps	Goals
Sweden	1962	1	0
Sweden	1963	1	0
Sweden	1964	0	0
Sweden	1965	0	0
Sweden	1966	5	5
Sweden	1967	7	2
Sweden	1968	2	0
Sweden	1969	1	0
Sweden	1970	4	2
Sweden	1971	1	0
Total		22	9

Scores and results list Sweden's goal tally first, score column indicates score after each Turesson goal.

List of international goals scored by Tom Turesson
No.	Date	Venue	Opponent	Score	Result	Competition	Ref.
1	18 September 1966	Ullevaal Stadion, Oslo, Norway	Norway	2–2	4–2	1964–67 Nordic Football Championship	
2	18 September 1966	Ullevaal Stadion, Oslo, Norway	Norway	3–2	4–2	1964–67 Nordic Football Championship	
3	18 September 1966	Ullevaal Stadion, Oslo, Norway	Norway	4–2	4–2	1964–67 Nordic Football Championship	
4	5 October 1966	Råsunda Stadium, Solna, Sweden	Austria	3–0	4–1	Friendly	
5	5 October 1966	Råsunda Stadium, Solna, Sweden	Austria	4–1	4–1	Friendly	
6	5 November 1967	Råsunda Stadium, Solna, Sweden	Norway	1–0	5–2	UEFA Euro 1968 qualifier, 1964–67 Nordic Football Championship	
7	5 November 1967	Råsunda Stadium, Solna, Sweden	Norway	5–1	5–2	UEFA Euro 1968 qualifier, 1964–67 Nordic Football Championship	
8	7 June 1970	Estadio Nemesio Díez, Toluca, Mexico	Israel	3–1	3–1	1970 FIFA World Cup	
9	28 October 1970	Råsunda Stadium, Solna, Sweden	Republic of Ireland	2–1	2–1	UEFA Euro 1972 qualifier	

== Honours ==
Individual

- Nordic Football Championship top scorer: 1964–67 (shared with Erik Dyreborg and Ole Madsen)
