= Inge Persson =

Swedish footballer

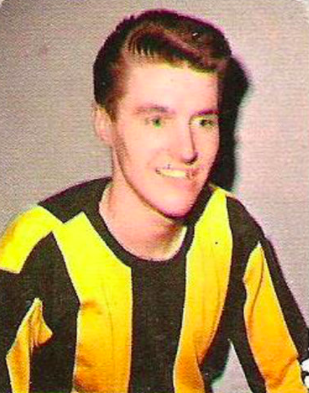
- Persson with Hammarby in 1965.

Personal information
- Full name: Inge Karl Georg Persson
- Date of birth: 1 October 1940
- Place of birth: Stockholm, Sweden
- Date of death: 2 March 2026 (aged 85)
- Place of death: Stockholm, Sweden
- Position: Midfielder

Youth career
- IFK Hammarbyhöjden

Senior career*
Years	Team	Apps	(Gls)
1958–1973	Hammarby IF	189	(22)
Total		189	(22)

International career
1962–1963	Sweden U21	4	(1)
1963	Sweden B	1	(0)
1962	Sweden	1	(0)
- * Club domestic league appearances and goals

Inge Persson (born 1 October 1940 – 2 March 2026) was a Swedish footballer who played as a midfielder, best known for representing Hammarby IF.

== Club career ==
Persson was born in Stockholm and started to play football as a youngster with local club IFK Hammarbyhöjden in the Swedish lower divisions. He moved to Hammarby IF in 1958 and made his senior debut the same year. It was not until 1961 that Persson established himself in the first team, at age 20.

He soon became known as an elegant playmaker with strong heading ability. On 21 September 1967, Persson scored a brace for Hammarby against rivals AIK in a 3–1 home win, a match for which he is still remembered by the club's fans.

Persson was regularly the captain of Hammarby and played eleven seasons with the club in Allsvenskan, plus five seasons in the second tier Division 2. In total, Persson made 189 league appearances and scored 22 goals.

Being injury prone throughout his whole career, Persson retired at the end of 1973, aged 33.

== International career ==
Persson won his first and only cap for Sweden in a 2–1 win against Thailand, in an away friendly on 16 November 1962. Together with teammate Gösta Lundell, he was called up by the former Hammarby coach Lennart Nyman who had been appointed manager of the national team the same year.
