= Karl-Evert Skoglund =

Swedish footballer

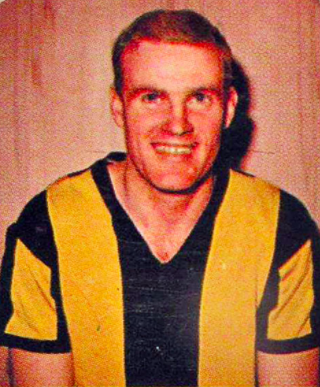
- Skoglund with Hammarby IF in 1963.

Personal information
- Full name: Karl-Evert Skoglund
- Date of birth: 14 January 1938 (age 88)
- Place of birth: Stockholm, Sweden
- Positions: Forward; winger

Youth career
- Nytorgets BK
- Reymersholms IK
- 1953–1956: Hammarby IF

Senior career*
Years	Team	Apps	(Gls)
1956–1966	Hammarby IF	210	(80)
1967–1970	Skövde AIK	61	(7)
Total		271	(87)

International career
1957–1961	Sweden U21	9	(6)
1962–1963	Sweden B	3	(0)
1962	Sweden	1	(0)

Managerial career
- 1972–1975: IFK Hjo
- * Club domestic league appearances and goals

Karl-Evert "Ya" Skoglund (born 21 January 1938) is a Swedish former footballer who mostly played as a forward, best known for representing Hammarby IF.

He is the younger brother of late Lennart Skoglund, one of the most renowned Swedish footballers in history.

== Early life ==
Skoglund grew up in a working-class home in the Södermalm district of Stockholm, in a small apartment together with his parents, Josef and Linnéa, and two older brothers, Georg and Lennart. He started to play football with local clubs Nytorgets BK and Reymersholms IK as a youngster. Skoglund joined Hammarby IF, like both his siblings had before, in 1953 at age 15.

== Club career ==
=== Hammarby IF ===
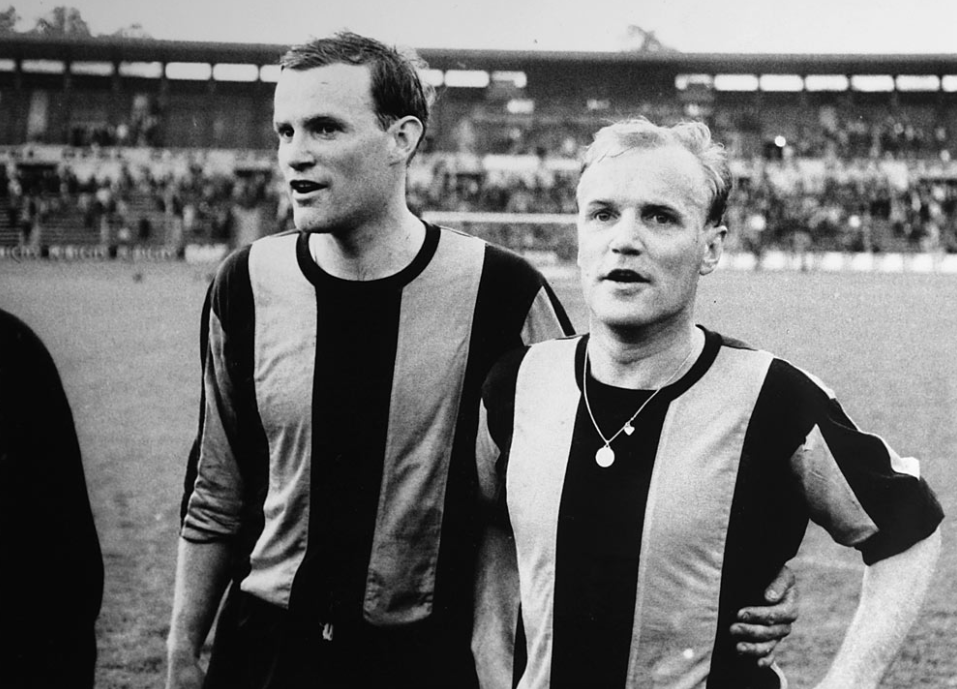
Brothers Karl-Evert "Ya" Skoglund (left) and Lennart "Nacka" Skoglund (right) with Hammarby in 1965, pictured after a game against Örgryte IS on 23 June.

On 18 May 1956, at age 18, Skoglund made his senior debut for Hammarby in Allsvenskan, Sweden's top tier, in a 1–2 home loss against Norrby IF.

A year later, when Skoglund had turned 19, he attracted interest from Italian club Lanerossi Vicenza, but he eventually decided to turn down the offer. At this time, his older brother Lennart Skoglund was already a celebrated star player with Serie A giants Inter Milan.

In 1957–58, Hammarby spent one season in the second tier, where the team scored an impressive 117 goals in 33 fixtures throughout the campaign, with Skoglund playing an integral part, getting instantly promoted back to Allsvenskan.

Skoglund played for Hammarby in Allsvenskan between 1959 and 1963 His brother Lennart Skoglund returned to Hammarby from his years abroad in 1964. The siblings would play together for three seasons, two in Division 2 and one in Allsvenskan, forming a fruitful partnership on the left flank.

In total, Karl-Evert Skoglund played 210 league and qualification games for Hammarby, scoring 80 goals.

=== Skövde AIK ===
Ahead of the 1967 season, after much consideration, Skoglund decided to leave Hammarby. He moved to Skövde AIK, newly promoted to Division 2, as they promised him a job outside football at Uno-X, a petrol company that sponsored the club. Arne Selmosson, a former Serie A player and Swedish international, is credited with finally convincing him to join the club. The transfer fee was set at 10,000 Swedish kronor.

Skoglund went on to play four full seasons with Skövde AIK in the Swedish second division, making 61 appearances and scoring 7 goals. In 1970, former Hammarby player Axel Ericsson was appointed as Skövde's new manager, which proved to be successful; the club almost won a promotion to Allsvenskan, but was knocked out in the final qualification stage. Aged 32, Skoglund decided to retire from football at the end of the year, due to a persistent knee injury.

== International career ==
After regularly featuring for the Swedish U21's and B-team, Skoglund won his first and only senior cap for Sweden on 12 November 1962. He played the full game in a 4–0 win against Israel, in an away friendly. Together with teammate Gösta Lundell, he was called up by the former Hammarby coach Lennart Nyman who had been appointed manager of the national team the same year.

== Personal life ==
When his playing career ended, Skoglund decided to stay in Skövde with his family. He was the manager of local amateur club IFK Hjo, in the Swedish lower divisions, between 1972 and 1975, also making a few appearances on the pitch.

His grandson Albin Skoglund also became a professional footballer in the 2010s.
