= Lars Boman =

Swedish footballer

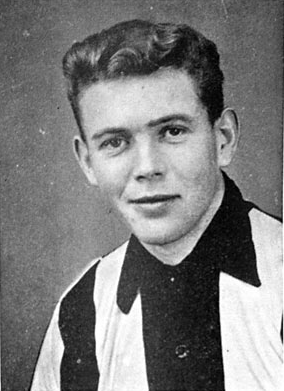
- Boman with Hammarby IF in 1955.

Personal information
- Full name: Lars Oscar Boman
- Date of birth: 6 March 1931
- Place of birth: Stockholm, Sweden
- Date of death: 18 November 2014 (aged 83)
- Place of death: Stockholm, Sweden
- Position: Left winger

Youth career
- 1939–1941: Westermalms IF
- 1941–1948: Ursvik IF
- 1948–1951: AIK

Senior career*
Years	Team	Apps	(Gls)
1952–1953	AIK	2	(0)
1954–1962	Hammarby IF	150	(46)
Total		152	(46)

International career
1954–1959	Sweden B	8	(2)
- * Club domestic league appearances and goals

Lars "Råttan" Boman (6 March 1931 – 18 November 2014) was a Swedish football player, best known for representing Hammarby IF.

== Club career ==
=== AIK ===
Born and raised in Stockholm, Boman started to play football with local clubs Westermalms IF and Ursvik IF as a youngster, before joining AIK at age 17, competing with their youth side and B-team.

Boman made his senior debut for AIK in Allsvenskan, Sweden's top tier, in the 1952–53 season, aged 21. He would, however, have a hard time breaking into the side as a regular, due to injuries and tough competition. Boman only made two league appearances in total for the club in total: playing the full 90 minutes in a 1–3 home loss against IF Elfsborg and in a 0–1 away loss against IFK Norrköping.

=== Hammarby ===
Before the 1954–55 season, Boman joined rivals Hammarby IF, newly promoted to Allsvenskan. Several other AIK players like Ragnar Blom, Axel Ericsson and Olle Nyström also transferred to Hammarby around this time.

Boman immediately established himself as a starting left winger in the Swedish first division for Hammarby. He became known for his strong left foot, pace, technique, finesse and dribbling skills.

He went on to play seven full seasons with Hammarby in Allsvenskan. In 1957–58, Hammarby also spent one year in the second tier, where the team scored an impressive 117 goals in 33 fixtures throughout the season, getting instantly promoted.

Boman chose to retire in late 1962, at age 34. In total, he made 150 league appearances for Hammarby and scored 46 goals.

== International career ==
Boman won 8 caps, and scored 2 goals, for the Sweden B team between 1954 and 1959. He was also called up as a reserve to the Sweden national team on one occasion, without getting any playing time.

== Personal life ==
His nickname "Råttan" (in English: "the Rat") allegedly derived from Boman getting chased by a cat, along the length of the pitch, in a reserve game with AIK. The moniker was later passed on to famous Swedish ice hockey player Rolf Edberg.

Professionally, he worked as a salesman and in advertising. Between 1968 and 1977, after his playing career, Boman was a board member of Hammarby IF, where he focused on sponsorships and the club's matchday programme.

In 1977, after a traffic accident, Boman was forced to have one his legs amputated, and later used a wheelchair for several years. He died on 18 November 2014, aged 83.
