= Klas Johansson =

Swedish footballer

Personal information
- Full name: Klas Göran Johansson
- Date of birth: 7 July 1956 (age 70)
- Place of birth: Stockholm, Sweden
- Height: 1.83 m (6 ft 0 in)
- Position: Left back

Youth career
- IF Brommapojkarna
- Hammarby IF
- Lillsjö IF

Senior career*
Years	Team	Apps	(Gls)
1975–1989	Hammarby IF	312	(6)
Total		312	(6)

International career
1976–1977	Sweden U21	9	(2)
1978	Sweden B	1	(0)
1977–1983	Sweden	13	(0)
- * Club domestic league appearances and goals

Klas "Klasse" Göran Johansson (born 7 July 1956) is a Swedish former footballer who played as a left back. He represented Hammarby IF throughout his whole professional career. A full international between 1977 and 1983, he won 13 caps for Sweden.

== Early life ==
Klas Johansson was born in Stockholm and grew up in the suburb of Vällingby. He started to play football with IF Brommapojkarna before moving to the youth organisation of Hammarby IF. At age 16, he returned to local club Lillsjö IF to play senior football in the Swedish lower divisions.

== Club career ==
Reportedly turning down a move to AIK, Johansson returned to Hammarby in 1975, at age 19. He made his debut in Allsvenskan the same year and played 13 games, as Hammarby finished 10th in the table.

Johansson established himself as a starter in 1977 under manager Björn Bolling, urged by teammate Tom Turesson, and played all 26 fixtures in Allsvenskan. The same year, Hammarby reached the final of Svenska Cupen, the main domestic cup, but lost 0–1 to Östers IF. He got known as a hard-working and physical full-back with a powerful shot.

In 1980, Hammarby finished 6th in Allsvenskan, their best result in ten years. With players like Kenneth Ohlsson, Billy Ohlsson, Mats Werner, Thom Åhlund, Thomas Dennerby, Michael Andersson, Ulf Eriksson and Mikael Rönnberg – Hammarby started to establish themselves as a contender for the Allsvenskan title the upcoming seasons.

The highlight of Johansson's career came in 1982 when Hammarby finished second in the table, going unbeaten the whole season. In the following playoff to decide the Swedish champion, the club went on to beat Örgryte in the quarter-finals and Elfsborg in the semi-finals. In the finals against IFK Göteborg, Hammarby won 2–1 in the first leg to a sold-out crowd away, but lost 1–3 in the home game at Söderstadion, missing out on the gold medal.

Johansson scored a brace in a 3–1 away win against Örgryte IS in 1983, his first ever goals in Allsvenskan. After the domestic success the year before, Hammarby also competed in the 1984–84 European Cup Winners' Cup, ultimately getting knocked out by Haka in the second round (2–3 on aggregate). In 1985–86, Hammarby qualified for the UEFA Cup, where they eliminated both Pirin Blagoevgrad and St Mirren, before getting knocked out by Köln in the third round (3–4 on aggregate). In total, Johansson played 10 continental games for Hammarby in the two European tournaments.

The club eventually started to decline and suffered a relegation in 1988 after finishing at the foot of the Allsvenskan table. Competing in Division 1 in 1989, Hammarby secured a promotion by scoring a goal in stoppage time in the very last game of the season, winning 6–0 away against Karlstad BK. They then surpassed contender Vasalunds IF, that had a one point advantage and were up by five in goal difference before the ultimate round, since they only managed to draw 0–0 against IFK Luleå. Amongst the Hammarby supporters, it soon became known as "Undret i Karlstad" (in English: "the Miracle in Karlstad"). Immediately after winning the promotion, Johansson retired from football, at age 33.

In 2004, Johansson was voted as Hammarby's tenth biggest profile throughout the history of the club. With a total of 312 matches played, and six goals scored, Johansson is the player who has made the second most league appearances for Hammarby, behind Kenneth Ohlsson.

== International career ==
Johansson was a regular member of Sweden's under 21 side for two years. He made his debut for the senior national team on 5 October 1977, coming on as a substitute in a 1–0 win against Denmark in a home friendly.

In total, Johansson would win 13 caps for Sweden between 1977 and 1983. Many pundits thought that he would get called up to the 1978 FIFA World Cup, but manager Georg Ericson ultimately left him out of the squad in favour of Ingemar Erlandsson, much to Johansson's disappointment.

Johansson is a recipient of the honorary award Stora Grabbars Märke, which is handed out by the Swedish Football Association.

== Career statistics ==
=== International ===
Appearances and goals by national team and year
National team	Year	Apps	Goals
Sweden	1977	3	0
Sweden	1978	1	0
Sweden	1979	5	0
Sweden	1980	0	0
Sweden	1981	0	0
Sweden	1982	1	0
Sweden	1983	3	0
Total		13	0

== Honours ==
=== Individual ===
- Stor Grabb: 1983
