= Gunnar Wilhelmsson =

Swedish footballer

Personal information
- Full name: Karl Gunnar Martin Wilhelmsson
- Date of birth: 4 October 1954 (age 72)
- Position: Goalkeeper

Senior career*
Years	Team	Apps	(Gls)
1972–1974	Norrstrands IF		
1975–1980	Hammarby IF	137	(0)

International career^{‡}
1975	Sweden U21	1	(0)
- * Club domestic league appearances and goals as of 23 December 2020 ‡ National team caps and goals as of 3 July 2020

Gunnar Wilhelmsson (born 4 October 1954) is a Swedish former footballer who played as a goalkeeper, best known for representing Hammarby IF.

== Career ==
As a youngster, Wilhelmsson started to play football with local club Norrstrands IF. In 1972, aged 17, he made his debut for their senior team in Division 4, Sweden's fourth tier.

In 1975, Wilhelmsson transferred to Hammarby IF in Allsvenskan, the domestic top division. He was sought out as a replacement for club legend Ronnie Hellström by chairman Lennart Nyman. He established himself as a starter in his debut season, as his side finished 10th in the table, where Wilhelmsson most notably saved a penalty in a 1–0 home win against fierce rivals AIK. On 2 September the same year, Wilhelmsson won his first and only cap for the Sweden U21's, in 2–0 friendly win against Finland.

A key player under manager Björn Bolling, Wilhelmsson kept a clean sheet in five of the first six league games of 1976, but the club eventually dropped of in the table and finished 8th in the league. In 1977, Hammarby reached the final of Svenska Cupen, the main domestic cup, but lost 0–1 to Östers IF. After putting on impressive performances with Hammarby IF for several season, leading the club to mid-table positions, Wilhelmsson was listed as a reserve player for Sweden in the 1978 World Cup.

In 1980, manager Bengt Gustavsson decided to drop Wilhelmsson in favour of Anders Markström, and he left the club at the end of the year. Wilhelmsson is the goalkeeper that holds the club record of most Allsvenskan appearances for Hammarby IF with 137 league games, in which he kept 38 clean sheets.
