= Mikael Hellström =

Swedish footballer

Personal information
- Date of birth: 11 March 1972 (age 54)
- Place of birth: Stockholm, Sweden
- Height: 1.78 m (5 ft 10 in)
- Positions: Defender; midfielder

Youth career
- –1981: Västerhaninge IF
- 1982–1989: Hammarby IF

Senior career*
Years	Team	Apps	(Gls)
1990–2005	Hammarby IF	301	(18)

International career
1991	Sweden U18	1	(0)
1999	Sweden	1	(0)
- * Club domestic league appearances and goals

Mikael "Hella" Hellström (born 11 March 1972) is a Swedish retired footballer. Throughout his whole professional career he represented Hammarby IF, as a one club man.

== Early life ==
Mikael Hellström started playing football at the local club Västerhaninge IF, before joining Hammarby IF as a youth player in 1982, at age 10. As a youngster, he mostly played a central defender.

== Club career ==
He advanced through the ranks at Hammarby and made his senior debut for the club in Allsvenskan in 1990, aged 18. His first competitive appearance came as a substitute in a local derby on August 13 in a shocking 1-9 loss against Djurgårdens IF.

He soon established himself as a regular starter during the 1990s, a period when Hammarby was known as a yo-yo club bouncing between the first and second tier. He usually played at a central midfield position, being known as a technically gifted player with good leadership and work rate.

During the later years of his career he repositioned himself playing as a left full back. His biggest achievement came in 2001 when Hammarby won Allsvenskan for the first time in the club's history.

During the 2002–03 UEFA Champions League qualification stage, he featured in both games as Hammarby got knocked out by the Serbian side Partizan Belgrade in the second round (1-5 on aggregate).

Mikael Hellström was forced into retirement in 2005, aged 33, due to a hip injury. In total, he made 301 league appearances for Hammarby IF and scored 18 goals. Hellström also captained the side in the seasons of 1999, 2000 and 2002.

In 2004, Hellström was voted as Hammarby Fotboll's twelfth biggest profile throughout the history of the club. Between 2007 and 2008, he worked as a scout for said club during the reign of manager Tony Gustavsson and director of football (as well as former teammate) Lars Eriksson.

== International career ==
Hellström was a part of the Swedish under-20 national team during the 1991 FIFA World Youth Championship in Portugal. He won his first, and single cap, for the side in a 0-2 group stage loss against Brazil on 20 June in said tournament.

In May 1999, he won his first and only cap for the Sweden national team, playing the entire game in a 2–1 friendly over Jamaica on Råsunda Stadium.

== Honours ==
Hammarby

- Allsvenskan: 2001
