= Arne Larsson (footballer, born 1934) =

Swedish football and bandy player

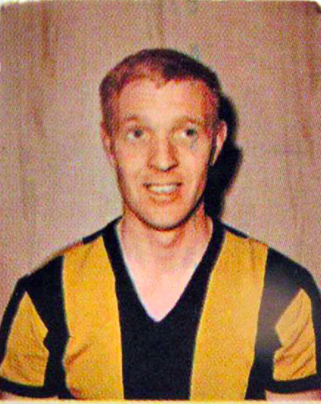
- Arne Larsson in 1963.
- Born: Arne Larsson; 30 December 1934; Stockholm, Sweden
- Died: 26 April 1994 (aged 59)
Association football career
- Positions: Centre-back; full-back; midfielder
Senior career*
Years	Team	Apps	(Gls)
1949–1957	Mälarhöjdens IK		
1957–1965	Hammarby IF	138	(3)
International career
1952	Sweden U21	1	(0)
1959–1961	Sweden B	2	(0)
1959–1960	Sweden	3	(0)
- * Club domestic league appearances and goals
Bandy career
- Playing position: Midfielder
Senior career*
Years	Team	Apps^{†}	(Gls)^{†}
1949–1959	Mälarhöjdens IK		
1959–1960	Hammarby IF		
- * Senior club appearances and goals counted for the domestic league only. † Appearances (Goals).

Arne Larsson (30 December 1934 – 26 April 1994) was a Swedish football and bandy player, known for representing Hammarby IF in both sports. He won three caps for the Sweden national team.

== Athletic career ==
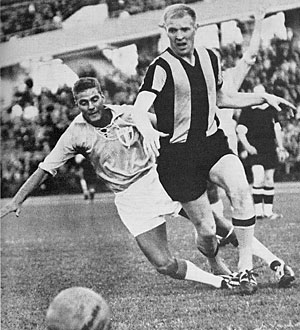
Larsson getting tackled by Sven Dyberg in a game against Malmö FF in 1964.

=== Football ===
==== Club career ====
Larsson was born in Stockholm and started to play football with local club Mälarhöjdens IK in the Swedish lower divisions.

In 1957, at age 23, Larsson joined Hammarby IF in Division 2. He won a promotion to Allsvenskan in his first season with the club.

He was known as tall, elegant and reliable centre-back or full-back. Larsson played six seasons for Hammarby in Allsvenskan, Sweden's top tier, and made a total of 138 league appearances for the club, before retiring in 1965.

==== International career ====
Between 1959 and 1960, Larsson won three caps for the Sweden national team; playing in two friendlies against Finland and one against Hungary.

=== Bandy ===
Larsson also played bandy for Hammarby IF for one season in 1959–60.

== Personal life ==
Long after has his playing career had ended, in the beginning of the 1990s, Arne Larsson was the chairman of the football section of Hammarby.
