= Björn Hedenström =

Swedish footballer

Personal information
- Full name: Björn Holger Hedenström
- Date of birth: 9 February 1954 (age 72)
- Place of birth: Stockholm, Sweden
- Height: 1.88 m (6 ft 2 in)
- Position: Centre-back

Youth career
- 1965–1975: Hammarby IF

Senior career*
Years	Team	Apps	(Gls)
1976–1984	Hammarby IF	139	(10)
Total		139	(10)
- * Club domestic league appearances and goals

Björn Hedenström (born 9 February 1954) is a Swedish former footballer who played as a centre-back. He represented Hammarby IF throughout his whole career.

== Club career ==
Born in Stockholm, Hedenström begun playing football with local club Hammarby IF as a youngster. On 3 October 1976, aged 21, he made his debut for the senior team in Allsvenskan, Sweden's top tier, in a 0–1 away loss against Malmö FF.

Hedenström was used sparingly in his first seasons with the senior team. It was not until 1979 that he broke into the side as a starting centre-back, after re-positioning himself from the midfield, playing 23 of 26 fixtures throughout the campaign, pairing up with Thom Åhlund.

He got known as a tough and physical centre-back, also being an excellent marksman from the penalty spot. In 1981, Hedenström scored eight penalties in total, namely in both of the two derby fixtures against fierce rivals AIK.

The highlight of Hedenström's career came in 1982 when Hammarby finished second in the table, going unbeaten the whole season. In the following playoff to decide the Swedish champion, the club went on to beat Örgryte in the quarter-finals and Elfsborg semi-finals. In the finals against IFK Göteborg, Hammarby won 2–1 in the first leg to a sold-out crowd away, but lost 1–3 in the home game at Söderstadion, missing out on the gold medal.

Hedenström decided to retire from football at the end of 1984, at age 30. In total, he played 139 league and playoff games for Hammarby, scoring 10 goals.

== Personal life ==
After his playing career, Hedenström worked as a sports physio for both Hammarby and the Sweden national team. He was also a board member of Hammarby's football section between 1985 and 1987.
