= Björn Löf =

Swedish footballer

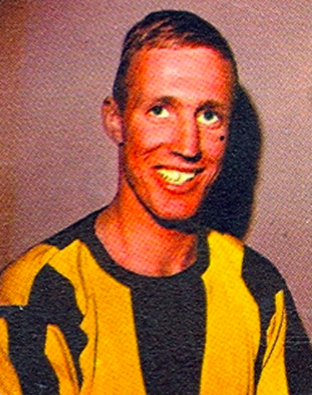
- Löf with Hammarby IF in 1965.

Personal information
- Full name: Björn Robert Löf
- Date of birth: 9 March 1945 (age 81)
- Place of birth: Stockholm, Sweden
- Position: Centre-back

Youth career
- Hammarby IF

Senior career*
Years	Team	Apps	(Gls)
1962–1972	Hammarby IF	188	(1)

International career
	Sweden U19	1	(0)
1965–1967	Sweden U21	5	(0)
- * Club domestic league appearances and goals

Björn "Bönan" Löf (born 9 March 1945) is a Swedish former footballer who played as a centre-back, best known for representing Hammarby IF.

== Club career ==
In 1962, at age 17, Löf made his senior debut for Hammarby IF in Allsvenskan, Sweden's top tier.

Löf soon established himself as a regular, and became known as tall centre-back with great heading skills. Between 1965 and 1967, Löf won five caps for the Swedish U21's.

He took a break from playing football in 1969 to study, but returned to Hammarby a year later. At the end of 1972, Löf retired from football definitely, aged 27.

In total, Löf played seven seasons in Allsvenskan and three in Division 2, the second tier, with Hammarby. He made 188 league appearances for the club, scoring one goal.
