= AIK Fotboll–Hammarby Fotboll rivalry =

Local derby in Stockholm, Sweden

- Location: Stockholm, Sweden
- Teams: Hammarby IF; AIK
- First meeting: 20 May 1920
- Latest meeting: 19 October 2025; Hammarby IF-AIK (2-1)
- Next meeting: 25 May 2026; AIK-Hammarby IF

Statistics
- Most wins: AIK (64) Hammarby (35)
- Largest victory: 30 September 1965; Hammarby IF–AIK (1–8)

The fixture between AIK and Hammarby is a local derby in Stockholm, Sweden.

== History ==
The clubs first met in a competitive game in 1920.

== Rivalry culture ==
The rivalry between AIK and Hammarby is one of the most important derbies in Sweden. AIK and Hammarby are clubs with considerable support in Sweden; in 2015, two of the games between these two teams had an attendance of 41 063 and 41 630 respectively. 23 of September 2018 a derby between these two teams had an attendance of 49,034. It's still the record for a derby in the Nordic countries.

AIK was founded in the district of Norrmalm, which constitutes the most central part of Stockholm City Centre, but later on they moved their club to the town of Solna due Råsunda Stadium where located there, where they play their home games during 1937-2012. Therefore AIK has a following in the northern parts of the city, as well as a strong concentration of fans in the northern part of Stockholm County, roughly along the blue line of the Metro. Hammarby and their supporters are mainly located in Södermalm, the southern district of the city centre where the club was founded and the area is very associated with Hammarby culture and their identity as a fanbase. The boroughs south of said district is also considered as their heartland. Derby name: "The Battle of the Stands". "North VS South". "The Battle of the Stands" originates from the fact that these 2 clubs have the largest and strongest fan base in terms of the number of spectators at their home games and how loud and energetic their stands are. Both teams' fans are considered the biggest in Sweden. "North VS South" gets its name from where the teams are located in Stockholm county. AIK in the north, Hammarby in the south.

== Fan Culture between AIK & Hammarby ==
Hammarby has a working-class profile, with a more relaxed, bohemian fan culture while AIK are often seen as more success-oriented, proud and self-confident – sometimes called "rodents" for their stubbornness and arrogance. Both clubs have some of Sweden's most passionate fans. Hammarby are known for their creativity, joy, spontaneous and often chaotic in a charming way. Known for high volume, strong singing and huge crowd turnout. AIK are known for their darker aesthetic, powerful chants and almost religious dedication. It often becomes a battle over who has the "best stands". Derby days are electric between these set of fans. The atmosphere in the city changes, and both fans and media build up a charge weeks in advance. There is often a heavy police presence. The rivalry has sometimes crossed the line with brawls, pyrotechnics and unrest, although both clubs also work for safety and a positive fan culture. It is common to see chants, banners and taunts towards each other – sometimes with crude humor, sometimes very personal. Winning a derby means more than just three points – it gives an entire neighborhood (or municipality) a psychological advantage for the next meeting. (Both clubs also maintain a cross-town rivalry with Djurgårdens IF, who counts the Östermalm district, the eastern part of the city centre, as their stronghold.)

== Matches ==
Updated 16 April 2025

	Matches	Wins		Draws	Goals		Home wins		Home draws		Away wins	
	Matches	AIK	Hammarby	Draws	AIK	Hammarby	AIK	Hammarby	AIK	Hammarby	AIK	Hammarby
Allsvenskan	107	52	30	25	172	117	28	19	14	11	24	11
Svenska Serien	6	3	1	2	14	9	2	1	1	1	1	0
Division 2	2	0	0	2	5	5	0	0	1	1	0	0
Svenska Cupen	12	8	4	0	20	12	5	2	0	0	3	2
SM-slutspel	2	1	0	1	6	3	0	0	0	0	1	0
Total	129	64	35	30	217	146	35	22	16	13	29	13

=== AIK in the league at home ===
Date	Venue	Score	Competition	Attendance
15 June 1921	Stockholm Olympic Stadium	4–1	Svenska Serien	10,000
18 May 1923	Stockholm Olympic Stadium	2–1	Svenska Serien Östra	3,000
7 Oct 1923	Stockholm Olympic Stadium	3–3	Svenska Serien Östra	5,000
5 June 1925	Stockholm Olympic Stadium	1–0	Allsvenskan	2,000
26 July 1939	Råsunda Stadium	2–1	Allsvenskan	15,348
23 May 1952	Råsunda Stadium	0–0	Division 2 Nordöstra	6,952
10 June 1955	Råsunda Stadium	1–2	Allsvenskan	22,866
4 Sept 1955	Råsunda Stadium	6–1	Allsvenskan	35,663
9 Sept 1956	Råsunda Stadium	2–1	Allsvenskan	14,121
5 August 1959	Råsunda Stadium	2–3	Allsvenskan	20,347
19 May 1960	Råsunda Stadium	2–1	Allsvenskan	11,991
7 June 1961	Råsunda Stadium	3–1	Allsvenskan	20,355
5 Sept 1963	Råsunda Stadium	4–1	Allsvenskan	23,338
23 May 1965	Råsunda Stadium	1–1	Allsvenskan	25,759
10 May 1967	Råsunda Stadium	2–0	Allsvenskan	15,241
12 April 1970	Råsunda Stadium	1–1	Allsvenskan	12,182
24 August 1971	Råsunda Stadium	1–0	Allsvenskan	29,189
22 August 1972	Råsunda Stadium	2–2	Allsvenskan	20,972
21 August 1973	Råsunda Stadium	2–1	Allsvenskan	20,097
30 May 1974	Råsunda Stadium	2–0	Allsvenskan	30,674
15 May 1975	Råsunda Stadium	4–1	Allsvenskan	28,835
26 August 1976	Råsunda Stadium	2–0	Allsvenskan	29,306
12 May 1977	Råsunda Stadium	0–3	Allsvenskan	14,917
23 May 1978	Råsunda Stadium	1–1	Allsvenskan	14,636
13 Sept 1979	Råsunda Stadium	1–1	Allsvenskan	20,179
3 Sept 1981	Råsunda Stadium	0–1	Allsvenskan	11,605
26 August 1982	Råsunda Stadium	0–3	Allsvenskan	19,462
18 May 1983	Råsunda Stadium	2–2	Allsvenskan	17,001
14 June 1984	Råsunda Stadium	1–0	Allsvenskan	26,990
30 May 1985	Råsunda Stadium	0–0	Allsvenskan	9,735
1 Sept 1986	Råsunda Stadium	0–1	Allsvenskan	12,676
11 June 1987	Råsunda Stadium	1–1	Allsvenskan	11,626
25 August 1988	Råsunda Stadium	0–0	Allsvenskan	5,987
1 August 1990	Råsunda Stadium	2–0	Allsvenskan	8,189
1 Sept 1994	Råsunda Stadium	2–2	Allsvenskan	14,320
8 May 1995	Råsunda Stadium	3–2	Allsvenskan	17,859
19 May 1998	Råsunda Stadium	0–1	Allsvenskan	31,237
18 Sept 1999	Råsunda Stadium	2–0	Allsvenskan	21,714
8 May 2000	Råsunda Stadium	1–0	Allsvenskan	34,004
15 Oct 2001	Råsunda Stadium	5–2	Allsvenskan	34,593
2 May 2002	Råsunda Stadium	2–2	Allsvenskan	31,948
4 August 2003	Råsunda Stadium	1–3	Allsvenskan	29,777
13 May 2004	Råsunda Stadium	0–1	Allsvenskan	26,937
26 Sept 2006	Råsunda Stadium	0–2	Allsvenskan	29,117
24 April 2007	Råsunda Stadium	1–0	Allsvenskan	30,318
25 August 2008	Råsunda Stadium	2–2	Allsvenskan	23,011
28 May 2009	Råsunda Stadium	1–0	Allsvenskan	22,973
4 May 2015	Friends Arena	2–0	Allsvenskan	41,630
28 August 2016	Friends Arena	0–0	Allsvenskan	30,843
17 April 2017	Friends Arena	1–2	Allsvenskan	32,318
23 Sept 2018	Friends Arena	1–0	Allsvenskan	49,034
2 June 2019	Friends Arena	2–0	Allsvenskan	32,861
20 Sept 2020	Friends Arena	3–0	Allsvenskan	0 (Covid-19 restrictions)
25 April 2021	Friends Arena	2–0	Allsvenskan	0 (Covid-19 restrictions)
28 August 2022	Friends Arena	2–2	Allsvenskan	45,117
16 April 2023	Friends Arena	2–0	Allsvenkan	41,142
29 Sept 2024	Strawberry Arena	1–0	Allsvenskan	47,129

=== Hammarby in the league at home ===
Date	Venue	Score	Competition	Attendance
20 May 1920	Stockholm Olympic Stadium	1–0	Svenska Serien	10,000
3 May 1923	Stockholm Olympic Stadium	1–3	Svenska Serien Östra	4,000
16 May 1924	Stockholm Olympic Stadium	2–2	Svenska Serien Östra	4,000
10 August 1924	Stockholm Olympic Stadium	1–7	Allsvenskan	2,000
10 May 1940	Stockholm Olympic Stadium	0–3	Allsvenskan	9,116
3 August 1951	Stockholm Olympic Stadium	5–5	Division 2 Nordöstra	12,784
4 August 1954	Råsunda Stadium	1–3	Allsvenskan	30,096
10 May 1956	Råsunda Stadium	0–2	Allsvenskan	24,924
24 April 1957	Råsunda Stadium	0–0	Allsvenskan	16,483
22 April 1959	Råsunda Stadium	3–2	Allsvenskan	16,842
2 Oct 1960	Råsunda Stadium	2–3	Allsvenskan	16,274
30 August 1961	Råsunda Stadium	1–2	Allsvenskan	28,992
26 May 1963	Råsunda Stadium	1–2	Allsvenskan	18,758
30 Sept 1965	Råsunda Stadium	1–8	Allsvenskan	7,137
21 Sept 1967	Råsunda Stadium	3–1	Allsvenskan	6,878
24 Sept 1970	Råsunda Stadium	2–0	Allsvenskan	32,229
12 May 1971	Råsunda Stadium	2–0	Allsvenskan	27,608
13 June 1972	Råsunda Stadium	0–3	Allsvenskan	22,699
28 June 1973	Råsunda Stadium	3–0	Allsvenskan	14,680
27 August 1974	Råsunda Stadium	1–0	Allsvenskan	25,906
21 August 1975	Råsunda Stadium	1–0	Allsvenskan	18,339
20 May 1976	Råsunda Stadium	1–1	Allsvenskan	25,885
1 Sept 1977	Råsunda Stadium	0–0	Allsvenskan	22,451
7 Sept 1978	Råsunda Stadium	1–1	Allsvenskan	15,422
28 May 1979	Råsunda Stadium	2–1	Allsvenskan	15,052
11 June 1981	Råsunda Stadium	2–1	Allsvenskan	16,642
27 May 1982	Råsunda Stadium	3–0	Allsvenskan	16,619
31 August 1983	Råsunda Stadium	1–2	Allsvenskan	26,072
6 Sept 1984	Råsunda Stadium	0–3	Allsvenskan	16,466
3 Sept 1985	Söderstadion	3–1	Allsvenskan	12,885
29 May 1986	Söderstadion	0–4	Allsvenskan	12,413
2 Sept 1987	Söderstadion	1–1	Allsvenskan	6,755
16 May 1988	Söderstadion	1–2	Allsvenskan	7,758
13 Sept 1990	Söderstadion	4–1	Allsvenskan	7,286
19 May 1994	Råsunda Stadium	1–2	Allsvenskan	18,704
31 August 1995	Råsunda Stadium	1–2	Allsvenskan	15,358
10 August 1998	Råsunda Stadium	0–2	Allsvenskan	33,094
4 May 1999	Råsunda Stadium	0–2	Allsvenskan	31,412
21 Sept 2000	Råsunda Stadium	0–2	Allsvenskan	33,958
22 May 2001	Råsunda Stadium	0–0	Allsvenskan	29,393
2 Sept 2002	Råsunda Stadium	0–2	Allsvenskan	27,888
22 April 2003	Råsunda Stadium	1–1	Allsvenskan	29,983
18 Oct 2004	Råsunda Stadium	1–1	Allsvenskan	18,234
3 May 2006	Söderstadion	2–0	Allsvenskan	14,694
3 Sept 2007	Råsunda Stadium	1–2	Allsvenskan	25,870
14 April 2008	Råsunda Stadium	1–1	Allsvenskan	23,578
25 Oct 2009	Råsunda Stadium	1–2	Allsvenskan	23,884
27 Sept 2015	Tele2 Arena	1–0	Allsvenskan	28,945
24 July 2016	Tele2 Arena	0–3	Allsvenskan	26,618
10 Sept 2017	Tele2 Arena	1–1	Allsvenskan	29,306
20 May 2018	Tele2 Arena	0–1	Allsvenskan	29,266
22 Sept 2019	Tele2 Arena	2–1	Allsvenskan	27,329
21 June 2020	Tele2 Arena	0-2	Allsvenskan	0 (Covid-19 restrictions)
17 Oct 2021	Tele2 Arena	1–0	Allsvenskan	29,317
15 May 2022	Tele2 Arena	3–3	Allsvenskan	28,756
3 Sept 2023	Tele2 Arena	4–2	Allsvenskan	27,568
19 May 2024	Tele2 Arena	2–1	Allsvenskan	27,204
19 October 2025	Tele2 Arena	2–1	Allsvenskan	27,876

=== Cup ===
Date	Venue	Matches			Competition	Attendance
Date	Venue	Team 1	Score	Team 2	Competition	Attendance
27 May 1970	Råsunda Stadium	AIK	3–2	Hammarby IF	Svenska Cupen	1,091
9 November 1975	Råsunda Stadium	AIK	2–1	Hammarby IF	Svenska Cupen	1,469
5 October 1983	Råsunda Stadium	Hammarby IF	2–5	AIK	SM-slutspel Quarter-finals 1st leg	18,976
9 October 1983	Råsunda Stadium	AIK	1–1	Hammarby IF	SM-slutspel Quarter-finals 2nd leg	14,277
16 May 1985	Söderstadion	Hammarby IF	0–1	AIK	Svenska Cupen	5,960
8 May 1986	Söderstadion	Hammarby IF	0–2	AIK	Svenska Cupen	5,802
5 May 1988	Råsunda stadium	AIK	2–1	Hammarby IF	Svenska Cupen	3,117
17 April 1996	Råsunda Stadium	AIK	1–0	Hammarby IF	Svenska Cupen semi-final	10,672
8 May 1997	Söderstadion	Hammarby IF	0–2	AIK	Svenska Cupen quarter-final	8,543
18 July 2002	Råsunda Stadium	AIK	2–0	Hammarby IF	Svenska Cupen quarter-final	12,155
7 March 2015	Friends Arena	AIK	1–2	Hammarby IF	Svenska Cupen group stage	41,063
15 March 2016	Friends Arena	AIK	3-5 a.p.	Hammarby IF	Svenska Cupen quarter-final	23,860
7 March 2021	Tele2 Arena	Hammarby IF	3–2	AIK	Svenska Cupen group stage	0 (Covid restrictions)
13 March 2023	Tele2 Arena	Hammarby IF	2–1	AIK	Svenska Cupen Quarter-final	28,279

== Records ==
=== Biggest wins (5+ goals) ===
Margin	Result	Date	Event
7	Hammarby IF – AIK 1–8	30 September 1965	Allsvenskan
6	Hammarby IF – AIK 1–7	10 August 1924	Allsvenskan
5	AIK – Hammarby IF 6–1	4 September 1955	Allsvenskan

=== Longest runs ===
==== Most consecutive wins ====
Games	Club	Period
6	AIK	19 May 1960 – 5 September 1963
5	AIK	10 August 1998 – 21 September 2000
4	AIK	10 August 1924 – 10 May 1940
4	Hammarby IF	11 June 1981 – 26 August 1982

=== Most appearances ===
Games	Club	Player	Period
32	Hammarby IF	Kenneth Ohlsson	1967, 1970 – 1979, 1981 – 1983
18	AIK	Daniel Tjernström	1999 – 2004, 2006 – 2009

=== Goalscorers ===
==== Top scorer for the club ====
Games	Goals	Club	Player	Period
217	128	Hammarby IF	Billy Ohlsson	1972 – 1978, 1980 – 1986
170	122	AIK	Per Kaufeldt	1925 – 1934

== Shared player history ==
=== Transfers ===
- (Sweden) Axel Nilsson (Hammarby to AIK) (1932)
- (Sweden) Sture Gillström (Hammarby to AIK) (1933)
- (Sweden) Sture Gillström (AIK to Hammarby) (1934)
- (Sweden) Sven Bergqvist (Hammarby to AIK) (1935)
- (Sweden) Sven Bergqvist (AIK to Hammarby) (1935)
- (Sweden) Emil Haag (AIK to Hammarby) (1939)
- (Sweden) Kurt Kjellström (AIK to Hammarby) (1940)
- (Sweden) Svante Granlund (AIK to Hammarby) (1942)
- (Sweden) Gunnar Södergren (AIK to Hammarby) (1943)
- (Sweden) Gunnar Södergren (Hammarby to AIK) (1944)
- (Sweden) Bertil Bäckvall (Hammarby to AIK) (1946)
- (Sweden) Ragnar Blom (Hammarby to AIK) (1946)
- (Sweden) Lennart Skoglund (Hammarby to AIK) (1949)
- (Sweden) Gerhard Hill (AIK to Hammarby) (1949)
- (Sweden) Olle Nyström (AIK to Hammarby) (1950)
- (Sweden) Georg Kraemer (AIK to Hammarby) (1951)
- (Sweden) Hans Möller (AIK to Hammarby) (1951)
- (Sweden) Rune Larsson (AIK to Hammarby) (1953)
- (Sweden) Lars Boman (AIK to Hammarby) (1954)
- (Sweden) Axel Ericsson (Hammarby to AIK) (1954)
- (Sweden) Axel Ericsson (AIK to Hamamrby) (1957)
- (Sweden) Benny Söderling (AIK to Hamamrby) (1966)
- (Sweden) Ulf Tjernström (AIK to Hammarby) (1990)
- (Sweden) Hernando Salvatore Labbé Solinas (Hammarby to AIK) (1993)
- (Sweden) Kim Bergstrand (AIK to Hammarby) (1995)
- (Sweden) Cesar Pacha (AIK to Hammarby) (1998)
- (Sweden) Benjamin Kibebe (Hammarby to AIK) (1999)
- (Sweden) Joe Mendes (Hammarby to AIK) (2022)

=== Played for both clubs ===
- (Sweden) Mikael Samuelsson (Hammarby to Tyresö FF to AIK) (1986)
- (Sweden) Hans Eskilsson (Hammarby to Sporting CP to SC Braga to AIK to GD Estoril Praia to Hammarby) (1990, 1992)
- (Sweden) Hans Bergh (Hammarby to Degerfors IF to Helsingborgs IF to AIK) (1998)
- (Sweden) Andreas Alm (Hammarby to Kongsvinger IL to AIK) (1998)
- (Sweden) Alexander Östlund (AIK to Vitória S.C. to IFK Norrköping to Hammarby) (2003)
- (Uruguay) Sebastián Eguren (Hammarby to Villarreal to AIK) (2010)
- (Sweden) Oscar Krusnell (AIK's academy to Sunderland to Hammarby) (2017)

=== Played for one club, managed the other ===
- (Sweden) Andreas Alm (played for AIK and Hammarby, managed AIK)
- (Sweden) Sven Bergqvist (played for AIK and Hammarby, managed Hammarby)
- (Sweden) Michael Borgqvist (played for AIK, managed Hammarby)
- (Sweden) Georg Kraemer (played for AIK, managed Hammarby)
- (Sweden) Per Kaufeldt (played for AIK, managed AIK and Hammarby)
- (Sweden) Rolf Zetterlund (played for AIK, managed AIK and Hammarby)

=== Managed both clubs ===
Manager	AIK career						Hammarby IF career					
Manager	Span	G^{1}	W	D	L	Win %	Span	G^{1}	W	D	L	Win %
(Sweden) Hans Backe	1994–1995	52	18	17	17	34.6	1987–1988	44	11	13	20	25.0
(Sweden) Per Kaufeldt	1934–1940; 1951–1956						1940–1944					

^{1} Only competitive matches are counted.

== See also ==
- Local derby
- Djurgårdens IF–Hammarby IF rivalry
- Tvillingderbyt
