= Oscar Schirmer =

Swedish football, ice hockey and bandy player

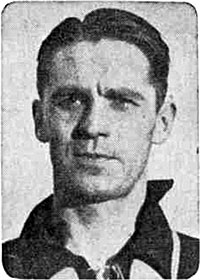
- Oscar Schirmer in 1936.
- Born: Oscar Schirmer; 22 March 1907; Stockholm, Sweden
- Died: 30 December 1941 (aged 34); Stockholm, Sweden
Association football career
- Positions: Centre-back; midfielder
Youth career
- Hammarby IF
Senior career*
| Years | Team | Apps | (Gls) |
| 1930–1940 | Hammarby IF | 132 | (2) |
- * Club domestic league appearances and goals
Ice hockey career
- Position: Defenceman
- Played for: Hammarby IF
- Playing career: 1931–1936
Bandy career
- Playing position: Defender
Senior career*
| Years | Team | Apps^{†} | (Gls)^{†} |
| 1930–1936 | Hammarby IF | | |
- * Senior club appearances and goals counted for the domestic league only. † Appearances (Goals).

Oscar "Nicko" Schirmer (22 March 1907 – 30 December 1941) was a Swedish football, ice hockey and bandy player, known for representing Hammarby IF in all three sports.

== Athletic career ==
=== Football ===
In 1930, Schirmer made his debut for Hammarby IF in Division 2. Playing as a centre-back or midfielder, regularly captaining the side, Schirmer mostly competed in the Swedish second division throughout his career. He became known for his heading skills and endurance on the pitch. Schirmer played his last season in 1939–40, making five appearances for Hammarby in the highest domestic league Allsvenskan.

=== Hockey ===
He played hockey with Hammarby IF in 1932 and 1936. The club won the Swedish championship both seasons, but Schirmer did not feature in the finals and therefore missed out on winning the gold medals. He also played with Hammarby's B-team for several seasons.

=== Bandy ===
Schirmer also played bandy with Hammarby IF between 1930 and 1936.
