= Svante Granlund =

Swedish ice hockey player

Personal information
- Nationality: Swedish
- Born: 1 February 1921 Stockholm, Sweden
- Died: 28 November 2010 (aged 89) Stockholm, Sweden

Sport
- Sport: Ice hockey

Svante John Granlund (1 February 1921 – 28 November 2010) was a Swedish ice hockey player. He competed in the men's tournament at the 1948 Winter Olympics.
