= Axel Ericsson =

Swedish footballer and manager (1931–2019)

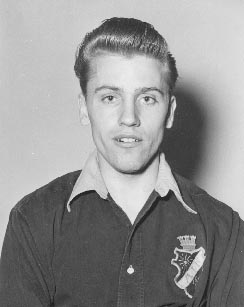
- Axel Ericsson in the AIK shirt.
- Born: Axel Erik Ivar Ericsson; 27 March 1931; Katrineholm, Sweden
- Died: 3 March 2019 (aged 87); Skövde, Sweden
Association football career
- Position: Left winger
Youth career
- –1943: Rynninge IK
- 1943–1946: Örebro SK
- 1946–1947: IFK Lidingö
- 1948–1950: Hammarby IF
Senior career*
Years	Team	Apps	(Gls)
1951–1954	Hammarby IF	44	(17)
1954–1956	AIK	28	(9)
1957–1962	Hammarby IF	93	(28)
1962–1963	Växjö BK		
1963	Hammarby IF	3	(1)
Total		168	(55)
International career
1952	Sweden U21	2	(0)
1953	Sweden B	1	(0)
Managerial career
- 1962–1963: Växjö BK (player-manager)
- 1964–1967: Hammarby IF (youth coach)
- 1968–1969: Mariestads BoIS
- 1970: Skövde AIK
- * Club domestic league appearances and goals
Bandy career
- Playing position: Forward
Senior career*
Years	Team	Apps^{†}	(Gls)^{†}
1951–1954	Hammarby IF		
1954–1956	AIK		
1956–1960	Hammarby IF		
- * Senior club appearances and goals counted for the domestic league only. † Appearances (Goals).
Ice hockey career
- Played for: Atlas Diesels IF
- Playing career: 1952–1953
Handball career
- Sport: Handball

Senior clubs
- Years: Team
- 1946–1949: IFK Lidingö

Axel "Acke" Ericsson (27 March 1931 – 3 March 2019) was a Swedish football player and manager, best known for representing Hammarby IF and AIK.

He also played bandy, handball and briefly ice hockey. Ericsson is one of only three athletes that has competed in the highest Swedish division in four different sports, together with Sven Bergqvist and Fred Eriksson.

== Athletic career ==
=== Football ===
Although born in Katrineholm, Ericsson grew up in Örebro and started to play football with local clubs Rynninge IK and Örebro SK as a youngster. He moved to Stockholm for work in his late teens and continued his career with IFK Lidingö.

He later went on to join Hammarby IF and made his senior debut for the side in 1951, at age 20, in Sweden's second tier Division 2. Ericsson became known as a nimble, technical and quick left winger, that often showed his strengths in counter-attacks. But he also lacked physical strength and was regarded as somewhat inconsistent. His playing-style resembled that of Lennart "Nacka" Skoglund's, who also happened to be Ericsson's favourite player.

In 1954, Ericsson moved to rivals AIK in Allsvenskan, the domestic top division. His new club had tried to convince him to join a year earlier, and when the transfer finalised it caused much upset among Hammarby's supporters. He would go on to play with AIK for three years in Allsvenskan, making 28 league appearances and scoring 9 goals (two against his former club Hammarby) in total, but failed to win any silverware.

Ericsson returned to Hammarby IF in 1957–58 and helped the club to win a promotion to Allsvenskan from Division 2; the team scored an impressive 117 goals in 33 fixtures throughout the season. He played a major part in establishing Hammarby in the top tier during the next four seasons, playing 63 games and scoring 15 goals, before he left the club in 1962 to become a player-manager for Växjö BK.

He made a brief third comeback for Hammarby in 1963, before retiring from football later that year.

=== Bandy ===
Between 1951 and 1960, Ericsson also played bandy with Hammarby IF and AIK in Allsvenskan, Sweden's highest division. He was part of the Hammarby team that in 1957 lost 2–1 against Örebro SK in the final of the Swedish Championship.

=== Other sports ===
In his younger days, Ericsson played handball with IFK Lidingö and won the Swedish Championship with the club in 1948–49, after which he retired from the sport.

In 1952–53, Ericsson made a brief appearance as an ice hockey player for Atlas Diesels IF in Division 1, Sweden's highest division, and helped the club from relegation.

== Managerial career ==
Ericsson was the player-manager of Växjö BK between 1962 and 1963. After his retirement as a player, he worked as youth coach at Hammarby between 1964 and 1967, where he would help a young Ronnie Hellström on his path to reach stardom as the future starting goalkeeper for the Sweden national team.

Between 1968 and 1969, Ericsson coached Mariestad BoIS. His biggest achievement as a manager however came in 1970, his last active season, when he almost led Skövde AIK to a promotion to the top tier Allsvenskan, but the club was knocked out in the final qualification stage.
