= Gösta Lundell =

Swedish footballer

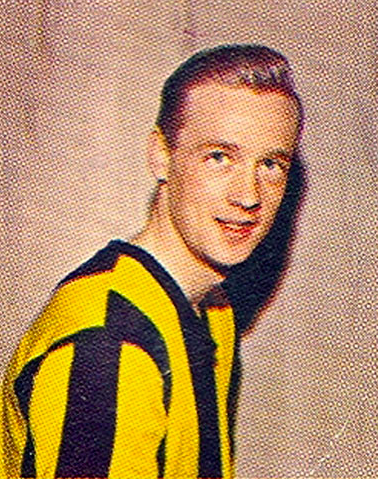
- Gösta Lundell with Hammarby in 1963.

Personal information
- Full name: Karl Hilding Gösta Lundell
- Date of birth: 14 October 1934
- Place of birth: Stockholm, Sweden
- Date of death: 27 February 2024 (aged 89)
- Height: 1.64 m (5 ft 5 in)
- Position: Midfielder

Youth career
- 1949–1954: IF Ulvarna

Senior career*
Years	Team	Apps	(Gls)
1955–1965	Hammarby IF	167	(3)
Total		167	(3)

International career
1958–1963	Sweden B	5	(0)
1962–1963	Sweden	7	(0)
- * Club domestic league appearances and goals

Gösta Lundell (14 October 1934 – 27 February 2024) was a Swedish footballer who played as a midfielder, best known for representing Hammarby IF.

A full international between 1962 and 1963, he won 7 caps for the Sweden national team.

== Club career ==
Lundell was born in Stockholm and started to play football with local club IF Ulvarna in the Swedish lower divisions.

On 14 May 1955, Lundell made his senior debut for Hammarby IF in Allsvenskan, Sweden's top tier, scoring one goal in a 2–5 home loss against GAIS.

He broke into the side as a regular starter in 1957, in a season where Hammarby got relegated to Division 2, and soon became known as a technically gifted playmaker in the midfield position.

In 1957–58, Lundell helped the club to win a promotion back to Allsvenskan; the team scored an impressive 117 goals in 33 fixtures throughout the season. He played a major part in establishing Hammarby in the top tier during the next four seasons.

Lundell decided to retire from football due to injuries at the end of 1965, aged 31, playing his last game for Hammarby on 24 October in a 2–4 home loss against IFK Norrköping. In total, he made 167 league appearances for the club, scoring 3 goals.

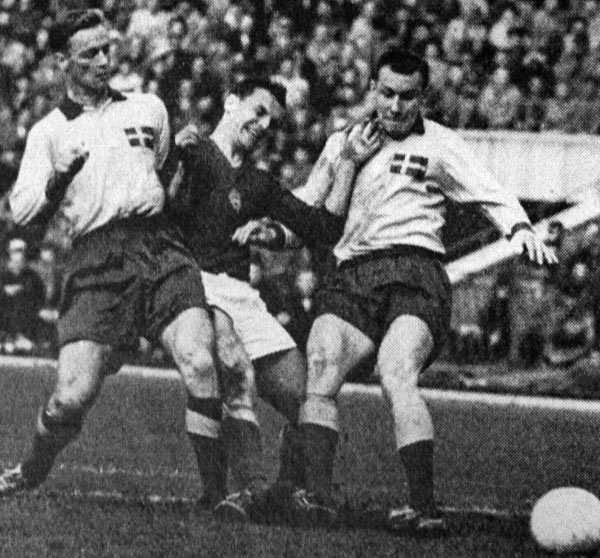
Lundell (left) playing for Sweden in a friendly against Hungary in 1963.

== International career ==
In 1962, Lundell was first called up to the Sweden national team for the first time together with teammate Tom Turesson,was this both their first times called up or was Turesson previously by the former Hammarby-coach Lennart Nyman who had been appointed manager of the national team the same year.

He won 7 caps for his country in total, with the only competitive appearance coming on 21 June 1962 in a 2–0 away win against Norway in a European Nations' Cup qualifier.

== Other sports ==
In 1956, Lundell played bandy for one season with Hammarby IF.
