= Thom Åhlund =

Swedish footballer and manager

Personal information
- Full name: Thom Alvar Åhlund
- Date of birth: 17 February 1953 (age 73)
- Place of birth: Stockholm, Sweden
- Position: Defender

Youth career
- Djurgårdens IF
- IF Brommapojkarna

Senior career*
Years	Team	Apps	(Gls)
1971–1972	IF Brommapojkarna	40	(4)
1973–1983	Hammarby IF	228	(9)
1984–1986	Skövde AIK	19	(0)
Total		287	(13)

International career
1970–1971	Sweden U19	8	(3)
1973–1979	Sweden U21	12	(0)
1979	Sweden	4	(0)

Managerial career
- 1984-1986: Skövde AIK (player-coach)
- 1987–1988: Friska Viljor
- 1989–1990: Umeå FC
- 1996–1998: Syrianska FC
- 1999: FOC Farsta
- 2000–2001: Syrianska FC
- 2002–2006: Hammarby IF (assistant manager)
- 2007: Syrianska FC (assistant manager)
- 2008: IK Frej
- 2009: Hammarby IF (interim manager)
- 2011: Akropolis IF
- 2012–2013: Nacka FF
- * Club domestic league appearances and goals

Thom Alvar Ålund (born 17 February 1953) is a Swedish former football player and manager, best known for representing Hammarby IF. In 1979, he won four caps for the Sweden men's national football team.

== Club career ==
=== Early career ===
Born in Stockholm, Åhlund started his career with Djurgårdens IF as a youngster. He soon moved to IF Brommapojkarna, in the Swedish lower divisions, where he made his senior debut in 1971.

=== Hammarby IF ===
In 1973, at age 19, Åhlund joined Hammarby IF in Allsvenskan, Sweden's first tier. He immediately broke into the squad and played 25 league games in his debut season, as Hammarby finished 8th in the table, scoring his first goal for the club in a 1–0 home win against IF Saab on 26 August.

Manager Olle Nyström re-positioned Åhlund from a central midfielder to a libero in 1974. Known as an elegant player, he was soon compared with Franz Beckenbauer by supporters of the club.

In 1977, Hammarby reached the final of Svenska Cupen, the main domestic cup, but lost 0–1 to Östers IF.

Åhlund was on the verge of becoming a professional abroad, attracting interest from clubs in both Belgium and Germany throughout his career. In 1980, he almost transferred to the competing Swedish club Mjällby AIF together with Sten-Ove Ramberg, a teammate at Hammarby. Both players eventually decided to turn down the offer following outrage from the club's supporters.

The highlight of Åhlund's career came in 1982 when Hammarby finished second in the table, going unbeaten the whole season. In the following playoff to decide the Swedish champion, the club went on to beat Örgryte in the quarter-finals and Elfsborg in the semi-finals. In the finals against IFK Göteborg, Hammarby won 2–1 in the first leg away, but lost 1–3 in the home game at Söderstadion to a record crowd, missing out on the gold medal. Åhlund was sidelined due to a groin injury throughout most of the season, but took part in the finals.

After the domestic success, Hammarby competed in the European Cup Winners' Cup the following year, ultimately getting knocked out by FC Haka in the second round (2–3 on aggregate). Åhlund decided to leave Hammarby after the loss on 2 November 1983, which coincidentally also was Kenneth Ohlsson's last game for the club. In total, Åhlund made 228 league appearances for Hammarby and scored 9 goals.

=== Skövde AIK and retirement ===
In 1984, Åhlund joined Skövde AIK as a player-coach. He stayed with the club for three seasons, competing in Division 3, before definitely retiring from playing.

== International career ==
After competing with the Swedish U19's and U21's, Åhlund debuted for the Swedish senior national team in 1979 in a friendly 0–2 loss to Norway. In total, he won four caps the same year, competing in one competitive fixture (a 1–1 away draw against Luxembourg on 23 October 1979 in the UEFA Euro 1980 qualifying campaign).

== Managerial career ==
After his player-coach stint at Skövde AIK, Åhlund spent the later stages of the 1980s and the 1990s coaching Friska Viljor, Umeå FC, Syrianska FC and FOC Farsta in the domestic lower divisions.

In 2002, Åhlund returned to Hammarby IF to work as the assistant coach of Anders Linderoth. The club went on to have several fruitful years in the Allsvenskan, being a consistent challenger for the Swedish league title. The duo left the club at the end of 2006.

On 31 August 2009, midway through the Allsvenskan season, he was appointed as the interim manager of Hammarby IF after the sacking of Tony Gustavsson. Åhlund was unable to save the club from a relegation to Superettan, the second tier, and left the position at the end of the year.

== Honours ==
=== Player-coach ===
Skövde AIK

- Division 3 Mellersta Götaland: 1985 (lost in the promotion playoffs), 1986 (promoted)
