= Kenneth Ohlsson =

Swedish footballer and manager

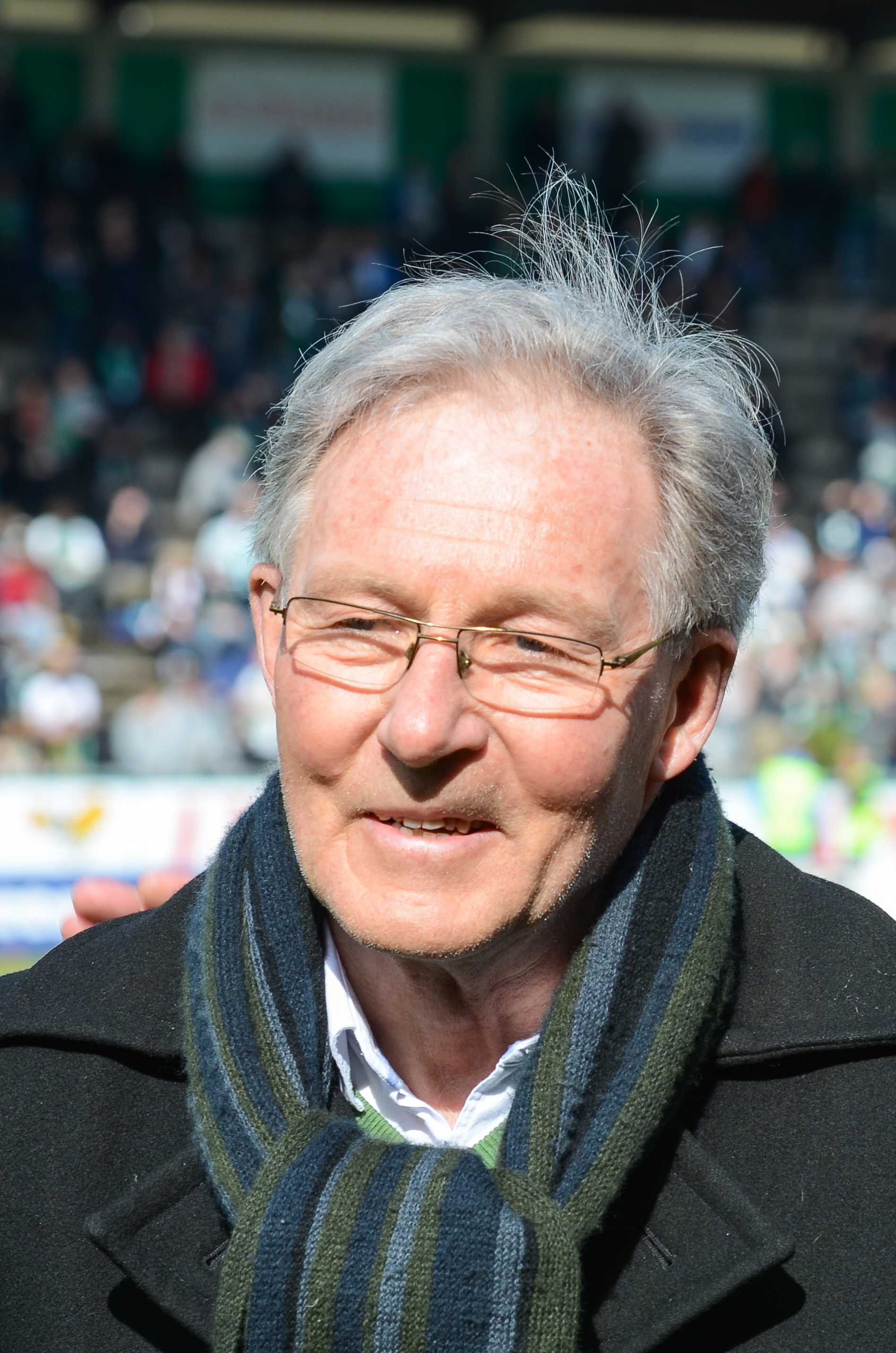
- Kenneth Ohlsson during the game Hammarby IF–IFK Värnamo in April 2013.

Personal information
- Full name: Lars Kenneth Ohlsson
- Date of birth: 7 September 1948 (age 78)
- Place of birth: Stockholm, Sweden
- Position: Midfielder

Youth career
- 1959–1965: Hammarby IF

Senior career*
Years	Team	Apps	(Gls)
1966–1983	Hammarby IF	396	(83)
Total		396	(83)

International career
1966–1967	Sweden U19	9	(2)
1970–1973	Sweden U21	7	(0)
1978	Sweden	1	(0)

Managerial career
- 1984: Hammarby IF (youth coach)
- 1985: Hammarby IF (assistant coach)
- 1986–1988: Spånga IS
- 1989–1992: Hammarby IF
- 1993–1994: IF Brommapojkarna (youth coach)
- 1995: Reymersholms IK
- 1996: Assyriska FF
- 1998–2000: Hanvikens SK
- * Club domestic league appearances and goals

Lars Kenneth "Kenta" Ohlsson (born 7 September 1948) is a Swedish former football player and manager. He represented Hammarby IF throughout his whole playing career, as a one club man, and holds the club record for most league appearances in total (396). Ohlsson also made one appearance for Sweden, in 1978.

== Early life ==
Kenneth Ohlsson was born in Stockholm and grew up in the suburb of Bagarmossen, together with his younger brother Billy Ohlsson who later would become a footballer. His neighbour Olle Nyström, who was a player for Hammarby IF, convinced him to join the club's youth setup in the late 1950s.

== Club career ==
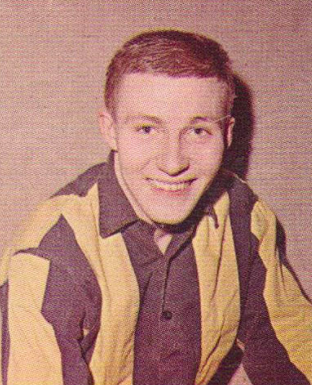
Ohlsson with Hammarby in 1967, aged 19.

In 1966, Ohlsson made his debut for the senior team, at age 17, in Division 2, Sweden's second tier. He soon broke into the side as a regular, playing with the likes of Lennart Skoglund and Tom Turesson, and Hammarby won a promotion to Allsvenskan the same year. He made his debut in Allsvenskan in 1967, playing all but three league fixtures throughout the campaign, but Hammarby finished at the foot of the table and suffered an immediate relegation.

The upcoming two seasons, Hammarby fought for a promotion from the second division. In 1969, Ohlsson scored 12 goals for Hammarby, of which in each of the two successful Allsvenskan qualification games against Sandåkerns SK and Helsingborgs IF. Ohlsson returned to the top tier with Hammarby in 1970, where he would compete for the rest of his career. Hammarby surprisingly finished 5th in the table same year, as Ohlsson had re-positioned himself from playing as a forward to a central midfielder. He got known as a hard-working and technically gifted playmaker with a strong passing game, also being a set piece-specialist.

Ohlsson was a regular member of Sweden's under 19 and under 21 sides up until 1973. By then, his younger brother Billy Ohlsson had been promoted to Hammarby's first team, and the two would go on to form a fruitful partnership in the offensive play. Kenneth Ohlsson grew out to become the club's star player, together with goalkeeper Ronnie Hellström, but Hammarby would fail to produce any sort of challenge for the Allsvenskan title in the upcoming years.

He scored a career-best tally of 13 goals in Allsvenskan 1976. A year later, in 1977 Hammarby reached the final of Svenska Cupen, the main domestic cup, but lost 0–1 to Östers IF. On 19 April 1978, Ohlsson won his only cap for the Sweden national team in a 3–1 friendly win against West Germany. Many pundits thought that Ohlsson would get called up to the 1978 FIFA World Cup the same summer, but manager Georg Ericson ultimately left him out of the squad. The decision was met with much disappointment from Ohlsson, who had sought a move to a club abroad to play professionally.

In 1980, Hammarby finished 6th in Allsvenskan, their best result in ten years. With players like Klas Johansson, Mats Werner, Thom Åhlund, Thomas Dennerby, Michael Andersson, Ulf Eriksson and Mikael Rönnberg – Hammarby started to establish themselves as a contender for the Allsvenskan title the upcoming seasons. Ohlsson later said:

The football we played in Hammarby around 1980... It did not exist in Sweden before we invented it. A completely superior attacking football.

The highlight of Ohlsson's career came in 1982 when Hammarby finished second in the table, going unbeaten the whole season. In the following playoff to decide the Swedish champion, the club went on to beat Örgryte in the quarter-finals and Elfsborg in the semi-finals. In the finals against IFK Göteborg, Hammarby won 2–1 in the first leg away, but lost 1–3 in the home game at Söderstadion to a record crowd, missing out on the gold medal.

After the domestic success, Hammarby competed in the European Cup Winners' Cup the following year, ultimately getting knocked out by FC Haka in the second round (2–3 on aggregate). Ohlsson decided to retire from football immediately after the second leg had been played, on 2 November 1983, at age 35.

Ohlsson holds a club record with 396 league appearances for Hammarby, in which he scored 83 goals. Due to his loyalty, playing 18 seasons with the club, he was given the nickname "Mr. Hammarby" by the supporters at the end of his career. In 2004, he was voted as Hammarby's third biggest profile throughout its history, and he became the first honorary member of Hammarby IF's football section in 2016.

== Managerial career ==
After his playing career ended, Ohlsson stayed with Hammarby and worked as the assistant to manager Björn Bolling in 1985, securing a 6th place in the Allsvenskan table. He left the club at the end of the year, becoming the new head coach of Spånga IS in the Swedish lower divisions.

In 1989, Ohlsson was appointed as the new manager of Hammarby, that had been relegated to Division 2, replacing Hasse Backe. The club secured a promotion by scoring a goal in stoppage time in the very last game of the season, winning 6–0 away against Karlstad BK. They then surpassed contender Vasalunds IF, that had a one-point advantage and were up by five in goal difference before the ultimate round, since they only managed to draw 0–0 against IFK Luleå. Amongst the Hammarby supporters, it soon became known as "Undret i Karlstad" (in English: "the Miracle in Karlstad").

Back in Allsvenskan 1990, Ohlsson was unable to rescue Hammarby from an instant relegation, with a squad consisting of several homegrown youngsters due to financial difficulties. The club finished at the foot of the table, mostly due to a lack of defensive play, letting in a total of 52 goals in just 22 games. Ohlsson stayed as manager of Hammarby for two more seasons in Division 2, but was unable to lead the club back to Allsvenskan and left his position at the end of 1992.

He later held different coaching positions at several lower-level clubs based in Stockholm County: IF Brommapojkarna, Reymersholms IK, Assyriska FF and Hanvikens SK. In the beginning of the 2000s, Ohlsson briefly returned to Hammarby as head of their youth academy.

== Other sports ==
Ohlsson played ice hockey with Hammarby IF for six seasons between 1965 and 1973, both in the Swedish top tier Division 1 and in Division 2. As a forward, Ohlsson scored 198 goals in 150 games for the club.

He also played bandy for one season, in 1966, with Hammarby IF.

== Personal life ==
Professionally, Ohlsson worked as a PE teacher and football instructor at a sports gymnasium in Gubbängen, Stockholm, until his retirement. His daughter Matilda Agné later became a footballer and represented both Hammarby IF and Linköpings FC in Damallsvenskan.
