= Olle Nyström =

Swedish footballer (1928–2002)

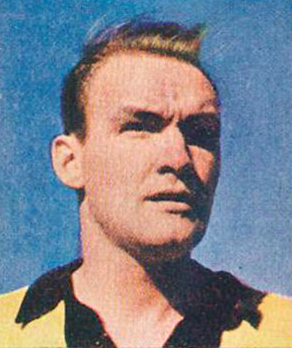
- Nyström with Hammarby in 1955.

Personal information
- Full name: Olle Nyström
- Date of birth: 18 July 1928
- Place of birth: Stockholm, Sweden
- Date of death: 18 July 2002 (aged 74)
- Place of death: Stockholm, Sweden
- Position: Centre-back

Youth career
- Väsby IK

Senior career*
Years	Team	Apps	(Gls)
1947–1949	AIK	4	(0)
1950–1959	Hammarby IF	171	(0)
Total		175	(0)

International career
1954	Sweden B	1	(0)

Managerial career
- 1973–1974: Hammarby IF
- * Club domestic league appearances and goals

Olle Nyström (18 July 1928 – 18 July 2002) was a Swedish football player and manager, best known for representing Hammarby IF and later coaching the club for two years.

== Club career ==
=== AIK ===
Nyström started to play football with local club Väsby IK, before joining AIK in Allsvenskan before the start of the 1947–48 season. He made his debut for the club in a 0–1 away loss against Halmstads BK on 27 July 1947. He would, however, have a hard time breaking into the side, and only made four league appearances in his two seasons with the club, leaving in 1949.

=== Hammarby ===
Before the 1950–51 season, Nyström joined rivals Hammarby IF in Division 2, Sweden's second tier. He soon established himself as a starting centre-back for Hammarby, becoming known for his heading skills and tackling ability.

In 1953–1954, Hammarby won a promotion to Allsvenskan in an unbeaten season, whilst using only 15 players, Nyström included. He won one cap for the Swedish national B team on 19 September 1954, in a 0–2 home loss against Norway.

Nyström went on to play five full seasons with Hammarby in Allsvenskan, making 171 appearances for the club in total, before retiring at the end of 1959, aged 31. He failed to score a single competitive goal throughout his senior career.

== Managerial career ==
Nyström was the manager of Hammarby in 1973 and 1974, finishing 8th and 9th in the Allsvenskan table in his two seasons in charge.

== Personal life ==
Nyström worked full-time as a policeman throughout his whole playing career. He married the sister-in-law of fellow footballer Gunnar Södergren, who also represented AIK and Hammarby.

He is credited with convincing Kenneth Ohlsson, who later would make the most appearances in the club's history with a total of 396 matches, to join Hammarby as a youngster in the late 1950s, since they were neighbours in the same Stockholm suburb of Bagarmossen.

== Works cited ==
- Persson, Gunnar (1996). Hammarby IF: En klubbhistoria 1897–1997 (in Swedish). Strömbergs Bokförlag. ISBN 91-7151-097-4.
