= Sören Cratz =

Swedish football manager

Personal information
- Full name: Carl Sören Harry Cratz
- Date of birth: 28 September 1948 (age 78)
- Place of birth: Finspång, Sweden

Managerial career
- Years: Team
- 1984: IFK Norrköping (assistant)
- 1989: IF Skarp
- 1990–1992: Degerfors IF
- 1993–1994: IFK Norrköping
- 1995–1996: Degerfors IF
- 1997–1998: Trelleborgs FF
- 1999: VPS
- 1999–2001: Hammarby IF
- 2002: Helsingborgs IF
- 2003–2005: Mjällby AIF
- 2006–2007: Västerås SK
- 2007–2008: IFK Norrköping

Carl Sören Harry Cratz (born 28 September 1948) is a Swedish former football manager. As a manager of Hammarby IF, he won the 2001 Allsvenskan.
