= Skövde AIK =

Swedish football club

- Full name: Skövde Allmänna Idrottsklubb
- Nickname: SAIK
- Founded: 1919
- Ground: Södermalms IP, Skövde
- Capacity: 4,500
- Chairman: Lennart Ek
- Manager: Charbel Abraham
- League: Ettan
- 2025: 12th
- Website: https://www.skovdeaik.se/
| Home colours | Away colours |

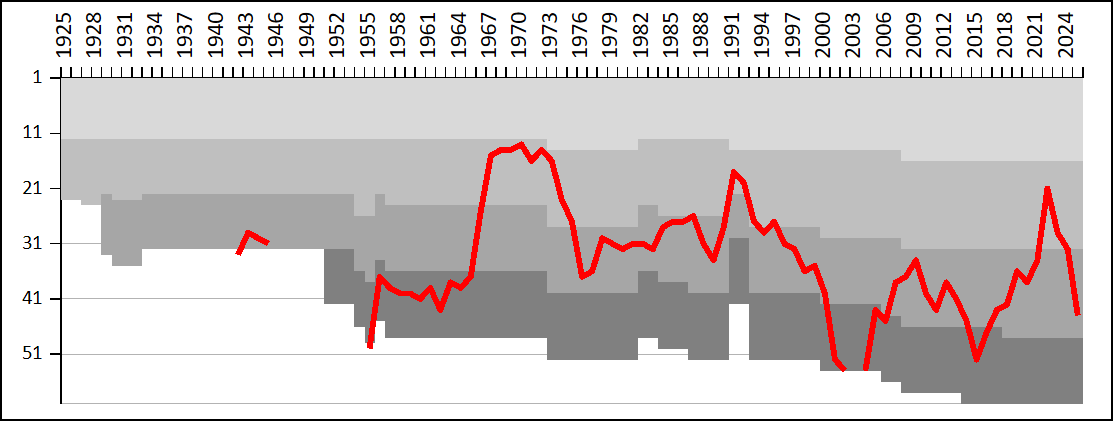
A chart showing the progress of Skövde AIK from 1925 to 2015 through the swedish football league system. The different shades of gray represent league divisions.

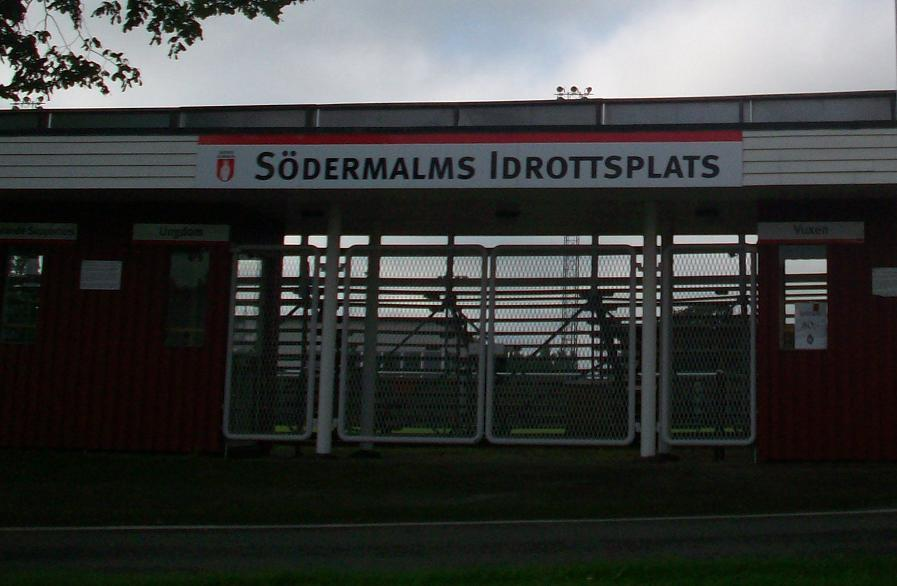
Södermalms IP

Skövde AIK is a Swedish football club from Skövde. It was founded on 21 June 1919. The club plays in the third-tier Ettan after relegation from Superettan in 2024.

== Background ==
Skövde AIK was founded on 20 June 1919. The club played in the second tier in 1995. eight seasons later the club had plunged into Division 5 Västergötland Östra, the sixth tier, having been relegated three consecutive times between 2000 and 2002. However SAIK have made a dramatic recovery and by 2007 were back in Division 1 Södra which is now the third tier of Swedish football after 4 consecutive promotions. In 2006, Skövde AIK won the Division 2 Mellersta Götaland after defeating IK Sleipner 2–1 in the decisive final match before 2364 spectators. In 2009 the club just failed to get into the Superettan after missing out in the promotion play-offs. In 2021 the club got promoted to Superettan. The first year in Superettan was a success, as they placed 5th, only 4 points away from the playoff game to Allsvenskan.

The club is affiliated to the Västergötlands Fotbollförbund.

== Season to season ==
| Season | Level | Division | Section | Position | Movements | Average attendance |
|---|---|---|---|---|---|---|
| 1993 | Tier 2 | Division 1 | Södra | 13th | Relegated | |
| 1994 | Tier 3 | Division 2 | Västra Götaland | 1st | Promoted | |
| 1995 | Tier 2 | Division 1 | Södra | 13th | Relegated | |
| 1996 | Tier 3 | Division 2 | Västra Götaland | 3rd | | |
| 1997 | Tier 3 | Division 2 | Västra Götaland | 4th | | |
| 1998 | Tier 3 | Division 2 | Västra Götaland | 8th | | |
| 1999 | Tier 3 | Division 2 | Västra Götaland | 7th | | |
| 2000 | Tier 3 | Division 2 | Västra Götaland | 10th | Relegation Playoffs – Relegated | |
| 2001 | Tier 4 | Division 3 | Mellersta Götaland | 10th | Relegated | |
| 2002 | Tier 5 | Division 4 | Västergötland Norra | 11th | Relegated | |
| 2003 | Tier 6 | Division 5 | Västergötland Östra | 1st | Promoted | |
| 2004 | Tier 5 | Division 4 | Västergötland Norra | 2nd | Promoted | |
| 2005 | Tier 4 | Division 3 | Mellersta Götaland | 1st | Promotion Playoffs | 481 |
| 2006* | Tier 4 | Division 2 | Mellersta Götaland | 1st | Promoted | 653 |
| 2007 | Tier 3 | Division 1 | Södra | 8th | | 571 |
| 2008 | Tier 3 | Division 1 | Södra | 5th | | 564 |
| 2009 | Tier 3 | Division 1 | Södra | 2nd | Promotion Playoffs | 831 |
| 2010 | Tier 3 | Division 1 | Södra | 8th | | 367 |
| 2011 | Tier 3 | Division 1 | Södra | 11th | | |
| 2012 | Tier 3 | Division 1 | Södra | 6th | | |
| 2013 | Tier 3 | Division 1 | Södra | 9th | | |
| 2014 | Tier 3 | Division 1 | Södra | 13th | Relegated | |
| 2015 | Tier 4 | Division 2 | Norra Götaland | 6th | | |
| 2016 | Tier 4 | Division 2 | Norra Götaland | 1st | Promoted | |
| 2017 | Tier 3 | Division 1 | Södra | 11th | | 364 |
| 2018 | Tier 3 | Division 1 | Södra | 10th | | 289 |
| 2019 | Tier 3 | Division 1 | Södra | 4th | | 436 |
| 2020 | Tier 3 | Division 1 | Södra | 6th | | 23* |
| 2021 | Tier 3 | Division 1 | Södra | 2nd | Promoted via Playoffs | 281* |
| 2022 | Tier 2 | Superettan | | 5th | | 1141 |
| 2023 | Tier 2 | Superettan | | 13th | Relegation Playoffs – Not relegated | 1006 |
| 2024 | Tier 2 | Superettan | | 16th | Relegated | |
| 2025 | Tier 3 | Ettan | Södra | 12th | | |

* League restructuring in 2006 resulted in a new division being created at Tier 3 and subsequent divisions dropping a level.

* Attendances are provided in the Publikliga sections of the Svenska Fotbollförbundet website. 2020 and 2021 was affected by the restrictions because of the COVID-19 pandemic.

== Current squad ==
As of 1 September 2026

Note: Flags indicate national team as defined under FIFA eligibility rules; some limited exceptions apply. Players may hold more than one non-FIFA nationality.

| No. | Pos. | Nation | Player |
|---|---|---|---|
| 2 | DF | SWE | Gottfrid Elofsson |
| 3 | DF | SWE | Samuel Johnson |
| 4 | DF | SWE | Aldin Basic |
| 5 | DF | SWE | Hannes Forsgård |
| 6 | MF | SWE | Erik Ström |
| 7 | MF | SWE | Emil Skillermo |
| 8 | FW | SWE | Alfons Nygaard |
| 9 | FW | SWE | Marc Agerborn |
| 10 | FW | SWE | Elias Nordström |
| 11 | FW | SWE | Liam Samuelsson |
| 12 | DF | SWE | Valdemark Linnarsson |

| No. | Pos. | Nation | Player |
|---|---|---|---|
| 13 | DF | SWE | Arvid Remmerfelt |
| 14 | DF | SWE | Liam Svensson (on loan from Mjällby) |
| 15 | MF | FRA | Esaïe Yoro |
| 16 | MF | SWE | Arvid Södeliden |
| 18 | DF | SWE | Linus Land |
| 19 | DF | SWE | Samuel Sörman |
| 20 | MF | SWE | Walter Ansgariusson |
| 25 | GK | SWE | Amar Ibrahimovic |
| 26 | MF | FIN | Antonio Almen |
| 30 | GK | SWE | Gustav Torstensson |

=== Out on loan ===
Note: Flags indicate national team as defined under FIFA eligibility rules; some limited exceptions apply. Players may hold more than one non-FIFA nationality.

| No. | Pos. | Nation | Player |

== Famous players that have played for Skövde AIK ==
- Johan Mårtensson
- Jakob Orlov
- Jonas Lindberg
- Sebastian Ohlsson
- Gustav Granath
- Viktor Granath
- Gustaf Norlin

== Achievements ==
=== League ===
- Division 1 Södra:
  - Runners-up (2): 2009, 2021.

== Managers ==
- Gunnar Reis (1958–59)
- (Sweden) Sven "Fiskarn" Johansson (1960–1961)
- Lars Daremark (1962)
- C-G Bolander (1963)
- (Sweden) Arne Selmosson (1964–68)
- (Sweden) Lars Arnesson (1969)
- (Sweden) Axel "Acke" Eriksson (1970)
- Carl-Axel "CAS" Stenberg (1971–72)
- Janne Carlsson (1973–74)
- (Socialist Federal Republic of Yugoslavia) Blagoja Vucidolov (1975)
- Carl-Axel "CAS" Stenberg (1976–77)
- Ove Wigertz (1978)
- Sven - Eric "Svenne" Johansson (1979–80)
- Christer Fermvik (1981–83)
- (Sweden) Thom Åhlund (1984–86)
- (Iceland) Teitur Thordarson (1987)
- Inge Lennartsson (1988–89)
- (Sweden) Christer Swärd (1990–94)
- Stefan Johansson (1995–96)
- Francisco Verona (1997)
- (England) Gary Wright (1998)
- Bengt Persson (1998)
- Francisco Verona (1999–2000)
- Magnus Henriksson (2001–02)
- Gudmundur Magnusson (2003–07)
- (Sweden) Stefan Jacobsson (2008–11)
- (Sweden) Rickard Söderberg (2012–2013)
- (Sweden) Charbel Abraham (2013)
- (Sweden) Mikael Thorvald (2018)
- (Sweden) Stefan Strind (2019–2020)
- (Sweden) Mikael Lindgren (2020)
- (Sweden) Tobias Linderoth (2021–2023)
- Srdjan Tufegdzic (2024–)

== Futsal ==
=== Honours ===
- 5 Futsal Swedish Championship: 2005, 2006, 2007, 2008, 2009
