= Billy Ohlsson =

Swedish footballer

Personal information
- Full name: Billy Roger Ohlsson
- Date of birth: 13 January 1954 (age 72)
- Place of birth: Stockholm, Sweden
- Position: Striker

Youth career
- Bagarmossens IS
- 1963–1972: Hammarby IF

Senior career*
Years	Team	Apps	(Gls)
1972–1978	Hammarby IF	127	(45)
1979	Arminia Bielefeld	9	(1)
1980–1986	Hammarby IF	90	(49)
1987	Södertälje FF	18	(19)
1988	Huddinge IF	11	(5)

International career
1976	Sweden U23	2	(1)
1978–1980	Sweden	6	(2)

Managerial career
- 1989–1992: Syrianska SK
- 1993–1994: Spårvägens FF (ass. coach)
- 1995: Hammarby IF (women)
- 1995–1996: Syrianska SK
- 1998: FC Krukan
- 1999–2000: Syrianska SK
- * Club domestic league appearances and goals

Billy Roger Ohlsson (born 13 January 1954) is a Swedish former football player and manager. He mostly represented Hammarby IF and is the club's all-time leading scorer with 94 goals in Allsvenskan. A full international between 1978 and 1980, Ohlsson won six caps for the Sweden national team.

== Early life ==
Ohlsson was born in Stockholm and grew up in the suburb of Bagarmossen, together with his older brother Kenneth Ohlsson, who also become a footballer. He started to play football as a youngster with local club Bagarmossens IS, before joining Hammarby IF at age nine.

== Club career ==
=== Hammarby IF ===
In 1972, Ohlsson made his debut for the senior team, at age 17, in Allsvenskan, Sweden's first tier. His first and only appearance for the season came in a shocking 1–8 loss against rivals Djurgårdens IF, in a game where Ohlsson scored the only goal for his side.

After primarily being used as a substitute player the following year, Ohlsson broke into the broke into the side as a regular in 1974, playing with the likes of Jan Sjöström and his youth idol Tom Turesson, as well as forming a fruitful partnership in the offense with his brother Kenneth Ohlsson.

In 1977, Hammarby reached the final of Svenska Cupen, the main domestic cup, but lost 0–1 to Östers IF.

Ohlsson had his major breakthrough in 1978, scoring 18 goals in 26 league games, being surpassed in the scoring league by Tommy Berggren on the final match day of the season.

=== Arminia Bielefeld ===
In the winter of 1979, Ohlsson drew attention from international clubs and signed for Arminia Bielefeld, recently promoted to the Bundesliga. Under manager Otto Rehhagel, he made nine appearances in the second half of the 1978–79 season and scored his only league goal in a 2–3 away defeat at FC Kaiserslautern. As a bonuspoint, the goalkeeper for 1.FC Kaiserslautern was Ohlssons former teammate in Hammarby, Ronnie Hellström.

=== Return to Hammarby ===
In 1980, Ohlsson returned to his former club Hammarby IF and immediately became the top scorer in Allsvenskan with 19 goals in 26 games, as the side finished 6th in the table, their best result in ten years.

The side finished second in the table in Allsvenskan 1982, going unbeaten the whole season. In the following playoff to decide the Swedish champion, the club went on to beat Örgryte in the quarter-finals and Elfsborg in the semi-finals. In the finals against IFK Göteborg, Hammarby won 2–1 in the first leg away, but lost 1–3 in the home game at Söderstadion to a record crowd, missing out on the gold medal. Ohlsson's season was, however, plagued by injuries and he only featured in seven games, although scoring four goals.

He was injured throughout the whole 1983 season, but made a strong comeback in 1984 when Hammarby finished 4th in the table. Ohlsson became the top scorer in Allsvenskan for the second time in his career, with 14 goals in just 21 games.

In 1985, Hammarby competed in the 1985–86 UEFA Cup. Ohlsson scored a brace against Pirin Blagoevgrad in the second leg of the first round, as the club won 7–1 on aggregate. His side later eliminated St Mirren in the second round, before getting knocked out from the tournament by FC Köln in the third round.

Ohlsson retired from professional football in at the end of 1986, but continued to play for other local clubs in the lower Swedish divisions for a few more years. He is Hammarby IF's all-time leading scorer with 94 goals in Allsvenskan. In 2004, he was voted as the club's ninth biggest profile throughout its history.

== International career ==
In 1976, Ohlsson won two caps for the Sweden national under-21 team.

On 4 October 1978, he made his debut for the Sweden national team in a 1–3 loss against Czechoslovakia in a UEFA Euro qualifier. In total, Ohlsson won six caps for the national team, scoring in two friendlies against Denmark and Bulgaria

== Personal life ==
Ohlsson was as a football coach in the lower Swedish division's after his playing career ended, but returned to Hammarby in early 2001 as a board member. Being responsible for the sport organisation, Ohlsson was criticised by supporters of the club after making the decision not to renew manager Sören Cratz's contract, that was due to expire at the end of the year, even though Hammarby was placed first and the league and later won the first ever Swedish Champions title in its history.

Outside of football, Ohlsson worked as a fireman. He was also hired as a pundit and football commentator by TV4.

== Honours ==
Individual

- Allsvenskan top scorer: 1980, 1984
