= Lars Eriksson (footballer, born 1965) =

Swedish footballer

Personal information
- Full name: Lars Rickard Eriksson
- Date of birth: 21 September 1965 (age 61)
- Place of birth: Stockholm, Sweden
- Height: 1.86 m (6 ft 1 in)
- Position: Goalkeeper

Senior career*
Years	Team	Apps	(Gls)
1986–1989	Hammarby IF	50	(0)
1989–1995	IFK Norrköping	189	(0)
1995–1996	Charleroi	9	(0)
1996–1998	FC Porto	9	(0)
1998–2001	Hammarby IF	73	(0)
Total		330	(0)

International career^{‡}
1986–1990	Sweden U21/O	15	(0)
1988–1995	Sweden	17	(0)
Medal record
Sweden
FIFA World Cup
Bronze medal – third place	1994
- * Club domestic league appearances and goals as of 1 March 2017 ‡ National team caps and goals as of 1 March 2017

Lars Rickard "Lasse" Eriksson (born 21 September 1965) is a Swedish former professional footballer who played as a goalkeeper. He represented Hammarby IF, IFK Norrköping, Charleroi, and FC Porto during a career that spanned between 1986 and 2001. A full international between 1988 and 1995, he won 17 caps for the Sweden national team and was a part of Sweden's 1990 FIFA World Cup, UEFA Euro 1992, and 1994 FIFA World Cup squads. He also represented the Sweden Olympic team at the 1988 Summer Olympics.

== Early life ==
Eriksson grew up in Haninge in Stockholm County where he started playing football at the local club Vendelsö IK. He moved to Hammarby IF as a youngster in 1977 at age 12. During his early teens, he lived abroad for a few years together with his family before returning to Hammarby and their B-team.

== Club career ==
=== Hammarby IF ===
Eriksson made his professional debut for Hammarby in Allsvenskan in 1986, aged 21, replacing Mark White as starter halfway through the season. He made his debut in a 5–1 win against Kalmar FF with Hammarby only conceding 1,2 goals per game during the remainder of the season with Eriksson between the posts.

He stayed as the club's first choice goalkeeper for another two seasons, before leaving in 1988 when Hammarby got relegated to Division 1.

=== IFK Norrköping ===
Before the start of the 1989 season he signed with IFK Norrköping in Allsvenskan. The team finished in second place during the regular series the same year, but won the subsequent play-off, ultimately being crowned Swedish champions. Eriksson saved two penalties in the third and decisive game of the finals against Malmö FF on 15 November 1989.

In 1990, he was awarded "player of the year" by the Östergötland Football Association.

He would later play another five seasons at Norrköping, with the team consequently finishing in the top half of the table. Lars Eriksson featured in every competitive game for the club during this tenure. He also won two Swedish Cup-titles with "Peking", in 1990–91 and 1993–94.

=== Charleroi ===
Halfway through the 1995–96 season, he moved abroad for the first time in his career. He signed for the Belgian Pro League league club Charleroi S.C. However, he would only feature in 9 competitive games for the side before moving to Portuguese club FC Porto in March 1996.

=== FC Porto ===
At Porto, he was crowned Liga NOS champion during three consecutive seasons, in 1995–96, 1996–97 and 1997–98. However, he was used sparingly and only featured in 13 competitive games. During his tenure at the club he mostly served as a backup for Vítor Baía, Andrzej Woźniak, Silvino Louro and Henrique Hilário.

=== Return to Hammarby IF ===
During the 1998 Allsvenskan midseason he returned to his native country, signing a deal with his first professional club Hammarby in July the same year. After returning with an injury, Eriksson's comeback would however be postponed up until the season of 1999, when he also was appointed captain of the team.

In 2001, he won Allsvenskan for the second time in his career. Hammarby secured the title from a victory against Örgryte IS on 21 October, on the second to last match day of the campaign. As he already had decided on retiring after the season, Eriksson was praised by the fans at the home ground Söderstadion together with then manager Sören Cratz, who also were to leave the club.

After the season, he was voted goalkeeper of the year at the annual Fotbollsgalan, hosted by the Swedish Football Association. In 2004, Eriksson was voted as Hammarby's sixth biggest profile throughout the history of the club.

== International career ==
Lars Eriksson debuted for the Swedish under-21 national team against England in 1986. He would later win 15 caps for the team, making his final appearances during the 1990 UEFA European Under-21 Championship.

He made his debut in the national senior team on 12 January 1988, starting in a 4–1 win over East Germany in Maspalomas. In total he would play 17 matches for his country up until 1995, often being used as bench cover for Thomas Ravelli. He took part in several major tournaments, the 1988 Summer Olympics, 1990 FIFA World Cup, 1994 FIFA World Cup and Euro 1992.

== Style of play ==
Eriksson was known a goalkeeper with good reactions and a strong line play. He was also noticed for his frequent ability of saving penalties.

== Managerial career ==
After his playing career ended, he was assigned the role as a goalkeeping coach at Hammarby in 2002. He would remain at this position up until 2007, when he was promoted to director of football at said club. He was however fired two years later, in May 2009, due to lack of results and financial reasons.

In late 2009, he joined the staff of the newly appointed Sweden national team manager Erik Hamrén as the goalkeeping coach. He was a part of the personnel during the Euro 2012 and Euro 2016, mainly working with the Sweden national team starter Andreas Isaksson, before leaving his post after the latter tournament.

== Career statistics ==
=== International ===
Appearances and goals by national team and year
National team	Year	Apps	Goals
Sweden	1988	1	0
Sweden	1989	1	0
Sweden	1990	2	0
Sweden	1991	2	0
Sweden	1992	4	0
Sweden	1993	1	0
Sweden	1994	5	0
Sweden	1995	1	0
Total		17	0

== Honours ==
IFK Norrköping

- Swedish Champion: 1989
- Svenska Cupen: 1990–91, 1993–94

FC Porto

- Primeira Liga: 1994–95, 1995–96, 1996–97, 1997–98
- Taça de Portugal: 1997–98

Hammarby

- Allsvenskan: 2001

Sweden

- FIFA World Cup third place: 1994
