= Ragnar Blom =

Swedish football and bandy player

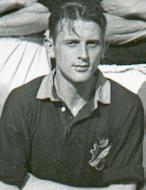
- Ragnar Blom playing for AIK in 1946–47.
- Born: Set Ragnar Blom; 7 February 1921; Avesta, Sweden
- Died: 10 February 2010 (aged 89)
Association football career
- Position: Right back
Youth career
- 1933–1935: Avesta AIK
- 1935–1939: Avesta IF
- 1942: IK Sture
Senior career*
Years	Team	Apps	(Gls)
1943–1946	Hammarby IF	58	(0)
1946–1947	AIK	3	(0)
1948–1950	Sundbybergs IK		
1950–1954	Hammarby IF	44	(1)
- * Club domestic league appearances and goals
Bandy career
- Playing position: Defender / Forward
Senior career*
Years	Team	Apps^{†}	(Gls)^{†}
1951–1957	Hammarby IF		
- AIK
- Djurgårdens IF
- * Senior club appearances and goals counted for the domestic league only. † Appearances (Goals).

Ragnar "Ragge" Blom (7 February 1921 – 10 February 2010) was a Swedish football and bandy player, known for representing Hammarby IF and AIK in both sports.

== Athletic career ==
=== Football ===
In 1936, at age 15, Blom made his senior debut for local club Avesta IF. At the beginning of World War II, Blom joined the Swedish Armed Forces and moved to Stockholm, where he continued to play football with IK Sture in the Swedish lower divisions.

At IK Sture, Blom impressed and got discovered by Per Kaufeldt, a former Swedish national player and current manager of Hammarby IF. In 1943, he made his debut for the club in Division 2, Sweden's second tier. Blom impressed at Hammarby and became known as a hard-working, fast-paced and versatile right-back, who also was a set piece specialist.

In 1946, Blom transferred to rivals AIK and made his debut in Allsvenskan, Sweden's top tier, in a 2–1 win against Degerfors IF on 8 September. He would, however, only make 3 appearances for the side in total, before leaving the club for Sundbybergs IK in the lower divisions.

In 1950, Blom returned to Hammarby IF. Hammarby got promoted back to Allsvenskan after winning the 1953–1954 Division 2 season, where the club went unbeaten whilst using only 15 players. Blom made 10 appearances for the club throughout the season, before announcing his retirement from football.

=== Bandy ===
Blom was also a prominent bandy player and represented both Hammarby IF and AIK in Allsvenskan, Sweden's first tier. He also played bandy with the third big club from Stockholm, Djurgårdens IF.

He returned to Hammarby IF after his playing career, being a part of their backroom staff between 1957–1963 and 1967–1971.

== Works cited ==
- Persson, Gunnar (1996). Hammarby IF: En klubbhistoria 1897–1997 (in Swedish). Strömbergs Bokförlag. ISBN 91-7151-097-4.
