= Ronnie Hellström =

Swedish footballer (1949–2022)

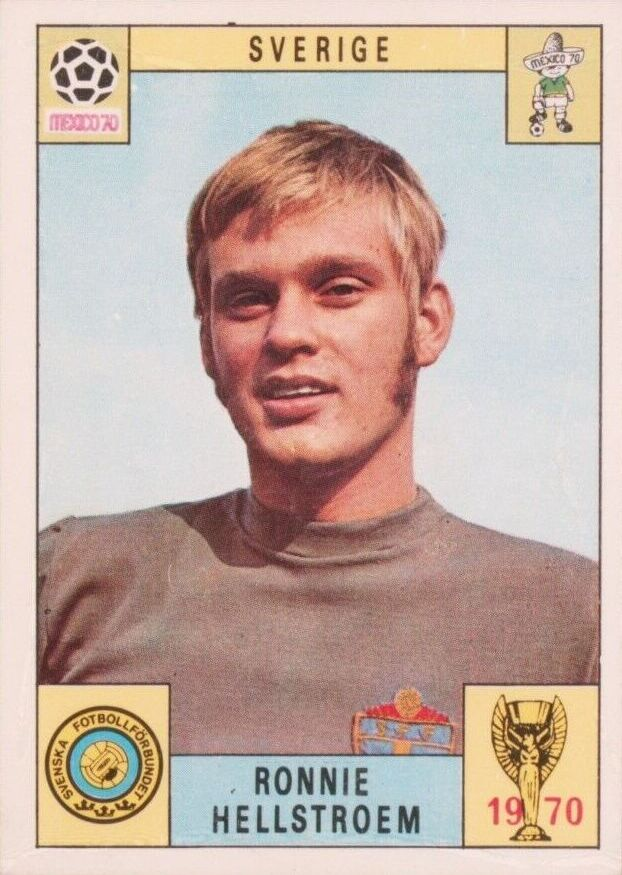
- Hellström at the 1970 FIFA World Cup

Personal information
- Full name: Folke Ronnie Wallentin Hellström
- Date of birth: 21 February 1949
- Place of birth: Malmö, Sweden
- Date of death: 6 February 2022 (aged 72)
- Height: 1.92 m (6 ft 4 in)
- Position: Goalkeeper

Youth career
- 1962–1966: Hammarby IF

Senior career*
Years	Team	Apps	(Gls)
1966–1974	Hammarby IF	171	(0)
1974–1984	1. FC Kaiserslautern	266	(0)
1988	GIF Sundsvall	1	(0)
Total		436	(0)

International career
1966–1967	Sweden U19	14	(0)
1968–1970	Sweden U21	9	(0)
1968–1980	Sweden	77	(0)
- * Club domestic league appearances and goals

Folke Ronnie Wallentin Hellström (21 February 1949 – 6 February 2022) was a Swedish professional footballer who played as a goalkeeper. He represented Hammarby IF and 1. FC Kaiserslautern during a career that spanned between 1966 and 1984. He was considered one of the world's best goalkeepers in the 1970s. In 1988, he played one Allsvenskan game for GIF Sundsvall following an injury crisis. As a full international between 1968 and 1980, he won 77 caps for the Sweden national team and represented his country at the 1970, 1974, and 1978 FIFA World Cups. He was awarded Guldbollen as Sweden's best footballer of the year in both 1971 and 1978.

== Early life ==
Hellström was born in Malmö to father Rolf, who also played football as a goalkeeper, and mother Ingegerd. During a brief period, Hellström trialed with local giants Malmö FF after getting invited by former national team player and then youth coach, Karl-Erik Palmér, but did not join the club on permanent basis. In 1962, when Hellström was 13 years old, his family moved to Stockholm after his father's job got relocated to the capital. On his own initiative, Hellström sought to continue playing football at Hammarby IF since he had read about the club's youth academy in a magazine.

== Club career ==
=== Hammarby IF ===
On 11 May 1966, aged 17, Hellström made his debut for Hammarby IF's senior team in a 3–1 away win against Avesta AIK in Division 2 Svealand, his only appearance throughout the season. In 1967, he became the club's starting goalkeeper, competing in Allsvenskan, Sweden's first tier. Although the team suffered a relegation, Hellström was voted as the best goalkeeper in the league by Sweden's dominating sports magazine Idrottsbladet.

Being considered as a yo-yo club, Hammarby played another two seasons in the second division. In 1969, the club won a promotion through eliminating Sandåkerns SK by 2–1 in the first play-off round, in which Hellström saved a penalty, and Helsingborgs IF by 2–0 in the final round. Returning to Allsvenskan in 1970, the club was placed last in the table after eight rounds in July, but went practically unbeaten through the rest of the campaign, eventually finishing fifth. In 1971, Hellström only conceded 26 goals in 22 fixtures, as the team finished tenth in the table. At the end of the year, he won Guldbollen, the prize as Sweden's best footballer, still being the only Hammarby player to ever have done so. In both 1972 and 1973, Hammarby finished mid-table in Allsvenskan, being unable to produce any sort of challenge for the Swedish champion title, but Hellström continuously stood out as the best goalkeeper in the league.

In total, Hellström made 171 league appearances for Hammarby in eight seasons. In 2004, Hellström was voted as the club's second biggest profile throughout its history, only behind Lennart Skoglund.

=== 1. FC Kaiserslautern ===
In 1974, following his stellar World Cup, Hellström was recruited by 1. FC Kaiserslautern in the Bundesliga and turned professional. In 1975–76, he led the side to the final of the DFB-Pokal, the main domestic cup, but lost 2–0 to Hamburger SV. In 1978, he finished sixth in the ranking for the Ballon d'Or, awarded to Europe's best footballer. He also won Guldbollen for the second time in his career, being the first and only goalkeeper to do so.

Although Hellström never won any silverware at Kaiserslautern, the club finished third in the 1979 Bundesliga, followed up by a fourth place in 1980, 1981 and 1982. He reached his second final in the DFB-pokal in 1980–81 with Kaiserslautern, but the team succumbed to a 1–3 defeat to Eintracht Frankfurt. The club also competed at continental level, most notably reaching the semi-finals of the 1981–82 UEFA Cup, being eliminated by the tournament's eventual winners IFK Göteborg through 2–3 on aggregate.

In 1984, after ten years in the Bundesliga, making 266 league appearances, Hellström decided to retire from professional football. Beloved by the Kaiserslautern fans for his performances and loyalty to the club, most notably turning down a lucrative offer from New York Cosmos, he became the first ever non-German player to be granted a testimonial match. On 21 April 1984, his farewell game drew a gate of 35,000 at the Betzenbergstadion. Among the participating players were domestic star players like Sepp Maier and Franz Beckenbauer, as well as his former long-time teammate from Hammarby, Kenneth Ohlsson.

== International career ==
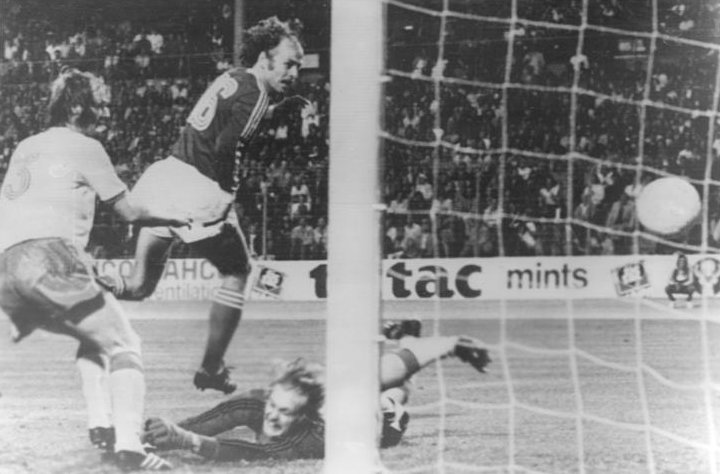
Hellström is unsuccessful in trying to stop Grzegorz Lato's header in the game against Poland in the 1974 World Cup. Kent Karlsson is visible on the left.

Hellström made his debut for Sweden in 1968 and immediately established himself as the first choice for his country. He played all three first-round matches at the 1970 FIFA World Cup in which Sweden narrowly missed qualifying for the quarterfinals. It is at the 1974 FIFA World Cup that he burst on the world stage with exceptional performances against Cruyff's Netherlands (0-0) and Beckenbauer's West Germany (2-4), contributing to Sweden's unexpected fifth place. Hellström also excelled in the 1978 FIFA World Cup but could not prevent Sweden's narrow first-round elimination. There were no other major tournaments in his career, as Sweden did not qualify for the 1982 FIFA World Cup or any Euro during this period. In total, he won 77 caps.

While in Argentina during the 1978 World Cup, Hellström took part in the demonstrations of the Madres de la Plaza de Mayo in front of Casa Rosada together with teammates Roy Andersson and Roland Andersson.

== Post-playing career and death ==
After his retirement, Hellström worked as a goalkeeping coach for Hammarby IF and Malmö FF. In 1988, Hellström made a brief comeback, playing one match in Allsvenskan for GIF Sundsvall, due to injuries at the club, aged 39 years, 7 months and 18 days.

In 2017 a biography of Hellström was released, named Ronnie – Bäst i Världen (Ronnie – Best in the world), and in 2019 a German version was also released, named, Ronnie – der Fliegende Wikinger (Ronnie – the flying Viking).

In 2021, Hellström was diagnosed with esophageal cancer. He died on 6 February 2022, 15 days before his 73rd birthday. Hammarby announced his death in a club statement, which said: "Ronnie Forever. Hammarby Fotboll is in grief. We have been reached by the news that Ronnie Hellström passed away early this morning, surrounded by his family, after a period of illness. Our thoughts are with his loved ones."

== Personal life ==
Hellström's son Erland also became a professional football goalkeeper, who represented Hammarby in 2000–2002 and 2007–2009.

== Career statistics ==
=== International ===
Appearances and goals by national team and year
National team	Year	Apps	Goals
Sweden	1968	3	0
Sweden	1969	6	0
Sweden	1970	5	0
Sweden	1971	7	0
Sweden	1972	7	0
Sweden	1973	7	0
Sweden	1974	11	0
Sweden	1975	5	0
Sweden	1976	6	0
Sweden	1977	6	0
Sweden	1978	9	0
Sweden	1979	3	0
Sweden	1980	2	0
Total		77	0

== Honours ==
1. FC Kaiserslautern

- DFB-Pokal runner-up: 1975–76, 1980–81

Individual

- Stor Grabb: 1970
- Guldbollen: 1971, 1978
- Bundesliga Team of the Season: 1977–78
- Sport Ideal European XI: 1978
- Onze Mondial: 1978
