= Sweden national football B team =

National association football team

Sweden B
- Nickname: Blågult (The Blue-Yellow)
- Association: Svenska Fotbollförbundet (SvFF)
- Most caps: Arne Arvidsson; Ingvar Svahn (13)
- Top scorer: Leif Eriksson (10)

First international
- Sweden 3–1 Norway (Stockholm, Sweden; 29 September 1929)

Last international
- Sweden 1–0 Poland (Eskilstuna, Sweden; 21 May 1997)

Biggest win
- Sweden 10–1 Finland (Falun, Sweden; 10 June 1956)

Biggest defeat
- Soviet Union 6–1 Sweden (Moscow, Soviet Union; 26 June 1955)

The Sweden national football B team was a secondary football team controlled by the Swedish Football Association. Sweden B played their first game against Norway on 29 September 1929, a game which ended in a 3–1 victory. Their last game was a 1–0 win against Poland on 21 May 1997. After that game the Swedish B team became defunct.

== See also ==
- Sweden men's national football team
- Sweden Olympic football team
- Sweden national under-21 football team
- Sweden men's national under-20 football team
- Sweden men's national under-19 football team
- Sweden men's national under-17 football team
