= Midnight Run (disambiguation) =

Midnight Run is an American action comedy film

Midnight Run may also refer to:

== Music ==
- "Midnight Run" (song), a 2011 song by Example from Playing in the Shadows
- "Midnight Run", a 1964 song by The Super Stocks from Surf Route 101
- "Midnight Run", a 1991 song by Alexander O'Neal from All True Man
- "Midnight Run", a 2016 song by Pia from the soundtrack for Let's Fight Ghost
- "Midnight Run", a 2012 song performed by Willie Nelson on the soundtrack for the film Lawless
- "Midnight Run", a song by Make Them Suffer on their 2017 album Worlds Apart
- Midnight Run, a 1989 album by Bobby Bland
- Midnight Run, a 2016 collaboration album from Vektroid and Siddiq
- Fool/Midnight Run, a 2016 EP by yahyel

== Other ==
- Midnight Run: Road Fighter 2, 1995 a racing arcade game, sequel to the 1984 Road Fighter
- Midnight Run, a television block of animated programming associated with Toonami on the Cartoon Network

== See also ==
- Midnight Runner, a 2002 novel by Jack Higgins
- Midnattsloppet (Swedish for "The Midnight Run"), a running competition in Nordic countries
- 12 am RUN (pronounced Midnight Run), a Las Vegas sneaker store opened by recording artist Nas
