= Lennart Nyman =

Swedish football manager (1917-1998)

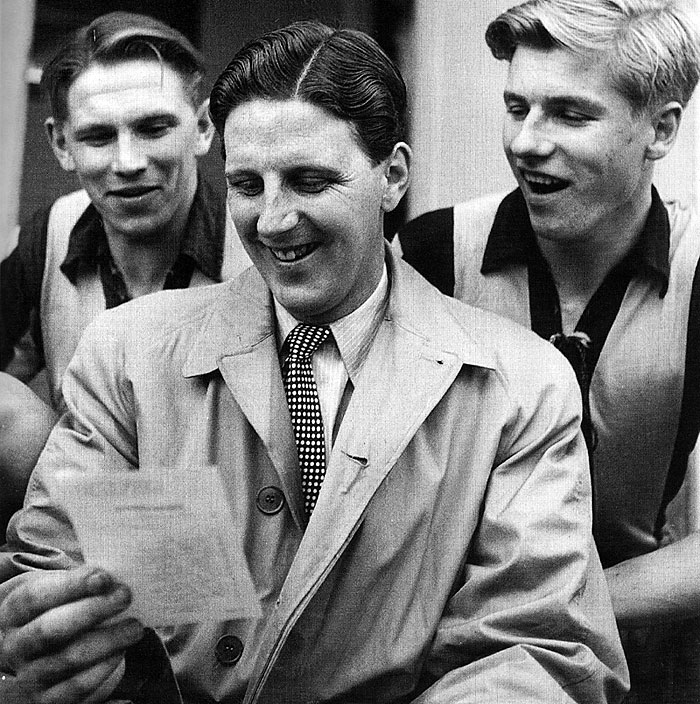
- Nyman in 1950 together with Hammarby IF together with players Allan Sparr (left) and Hans Nell (right).

Personal information
- Full name: Lennart Emanuel Nyman
- Date of birth: 25 June 1917
- Place of birth: Stockholm, Sweden
- Date of death: 25 August 1998 (aged 81)
- Place of death: Värmdö, Sweden

Managerial career
- Years: Team
- 1962–1965: Sweden

Lennart Nyman (25 June 1917 – 25 August 1998) was a Swedish football coach and sports administrator, best known for being the first ever manager of the Sweden national team between 1962 and 1965. He was also the chairman of multi-sport club Hammarby IF for 25 years, the longest-serving in its history.

== Athletic career ==
Born in Stockholm, growing up at Södermalm, Nyman started to compete in different sports with local club Hammarby IF in his youth in the 1930s. He played bandy, football and ice hockey at junior and reserve level.

Hammarby IF established a handball section in 1939. Nyman was part of their first senior squad, together with other famous athletes such as Holger Nurmela and Georg Skoglund, also the brother of renowned footballer Lennart Skoglund.

In the beginning of the 1940s, Nyman got promoted to the senior roster of Hammarby IF's hockey team. Hammarby won several Swedish Championship titles in his three seasons with the team, but Nyman did not play enough games to be awarded an official medal.

== Staff career at Hammarby IF ==
=== Football ===
In 1946–47, Hammarby IF's football team finished last in Division 2, and got relegated to Division 4 due to a restructuring of the Swedish league system. The next season, Folke Adamsson took over as the head coach of Hammarby, with Lennart Nyman being appointed as the new team manager. The economy had collapsed and the club's entire existence was now threatened.

Nyman would, together with Folke Adamsson, lead Hammarby IF from Division 4 back to Allsvenskan, the top tier, in just six seasons. The duo is credited with implementing a sense of work ethic and professionalism in the club. In the 1953–1954 season, the second tier was won without a single loss, whilst using only 15 players.

Hammarby went on to compete in Allsvenskan for the rest of Nyman's stint as team manager, before leaving the role in 1961 after being recruited by the Swedish Football Association.

=== Chairman ===
Nyman was the chairman of Hammarby IF's football section for a total of 32 years. Mainly between 1954 and 1984, later returning for a second stint between 1986 and 1987. The highlight came in 1982 when Hammarby finished second in the Allsvenskan table, going unbeaten the whole season. In the following playoff to decide the Swedish champion, the club went on to beat Örgryte in the quarter-finals and Elfsborg in the semi-finals. In the finals against IFK Göteborg, Hammarby won 2–1 in the first leg away, but lost 1–3 in the home game at Söderstadion to a record crowd, missing out on the gold medal.

Simultaneously, Nyman was the chairman of Hammarby IF's main board, that organised all of the 16 sections in the club participating in a variety of different sports, for 25 years between 1965 and 1990. As a sports administrator, Nyman got known for being a tough negotiator who governed with an iron fist, who rewarded athletes that showed loyalty to the club. His ever favourite athlete at Hammarby was ice hockey, bandy and football player Åke Andersson.

== Managerial career ==
=== Sweden ===
Nyman was the team manager of the Swedish national B team between 1957 and 1959.

From 1908 to 1961, the Swedish Football Association appointed an International Selection Committee which acted as national team managers. After failing to qualify for the 1962 World Cup, Nyman was appointed as the first actual manager of team Sweden.

During his tenure, Sweden reached the quarter-finals of the 1964 UEFA European Championship. They started their play-off against Norway and won the first game and drew the second leg. In the second round, Sweden beat Yugoslavia, 3–2, after a first leg tie. In the quarter-finals, Sweden played against the defending champions, the Soviet Union. Sweden tied the first game but lost the second.

Sweden also failed to qualify for the 1966 World Cup, finishing behind winners West Germany and ahead of Cyprus in the play-off group.

Nyman left his position as Sweden's manager in 1965, being replaced by Orvar Bergmark. His favourite national player was the IFK Norrköping defender Åke "Bajdoff" Johansson.

== Managerial statistics ==
Managerial record by team and tenure
Team	From	To	Record							
Team	From	To	G	W	D	L	GF	GA	GD	Win %
Sweden	1962	1965	36	14	13	9	60	44	+16	38.89

== Personal life ==
Outside of sports, Nyman started his professional career with the grocery retail group Konsum before being recruited to work as a manager at their competitor ICA. Nyman was later employed by the newspaper Metro. He was politically active in the Moderate Party.

== Works cited ==
- Persson, Gunnar (1996). Hammarby IF: En klubbhistoria 1897–1997 (in Swedish). Strömbergs Bokförlag. ISBN 91-7151-097-4.
