= Rune Larsson (footballer) =

Swedish football, ice hockey and bandy player

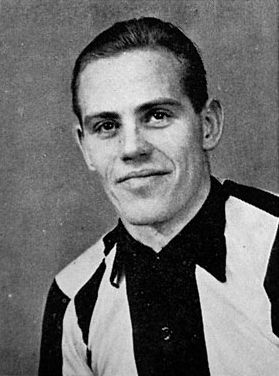
- Larsson with Hammarby in 1955.
- Born: 17 July 1927; Södertälje, Sweden
- Died: 15 August 2014 (aged 87)
Association football career
- Position: Forward
Youth career
- 1940–1943: Verdandi IF
- 1944–1947: Sundbybergs IK
Senior career*
| Years | Team | Apps | (Gls) |
| 1948–1952 | AIK | 47 | (14) |
| 1953–1958 | Hammarby IF | 111 | (64) |
Managerial career
- 1962–1963: Hammarby IF
- * Club domestic league appearances and goals
Ice hockey career
- Position: Forward
- Played for: AIK; Hammarby IF; Tranås AIF
- National team: Sweden
- Playing career: 1951–1960
Bandy career
- Playing position: Forward
Senior career*
| Years | Team | Apps^{†} | (Gls)^{†} |
- Sundbybergs IK
- AIK
- Hammarby IF
- * Senior club appearances and goals counted for the domestic league only. † Appearances (Goals).

Rune Larsson (17 July 1927 – 15 August 2014) was a Swedish football, ice hockey and bandy player, best known for representing Hammarby IF and AIK in all sports.

Although most known for his footballing career, Larsson briefly represented Sweden internationally in ice hockey.

He later coached his former football club Hammarby in the domestic top division Allsvenskan.

== Athletic career ==
=== Football ===
Raised in Stockholm, Larsson started to play football as a youngster with local clubs Verdandi IF and Sundbybergs IK.

In 1948, at age 20, he joined AIK in Allsvenskan, Sweden's first tier. Larsson soon broke into the side as a regular and won the 1950 Svenska Cupen with the club, beating Helsingborgs IF 3–2 in the final. He played four seasons with the club, making 47 league appearances and scoring 14 goals, before leaving after falling out with the board at AIK.

Larsson transferred to rivals Hammarby IF in 1953. He competed in Allsvenskan with the club for three seasons between 1954 and 1957, scoring 16 goals in 60 league games, although Hammarby was unable to produce any sort of challenge for the Swedish championship title. He became known as a technically gifted target player who possessed a great shooting ability, whilst also being a skilled penalty taker.

His best season however came in 1958, when Larsson scored 41 goals in just 33 games in Division 1. He was the driving force when the club won an immediate promotion back to Allsvenskan from the domestic second tier. It is still the highest number of league goals scored by a player in a single season at Hammarby.

At the end of 1958, Larsson was forced to retire from football due to a lung disease, aged 31.

=== Ice hockey ===
Between 1951 and 1956, Larsson was a prominent ice hockey player who represented both AIK and Hammarby IF in Division 1, Sweden's highest league at the time. In 1959, he made a brief comeback as a player-coach for Tranås AIF in the lower divisions. Larsson made five appearances for the Swedish national team throughout his career.

=== Bandy ===
Larsson also played bandy with AIK, Hammarby IF and Sundbybergs IK in Sweden's highest division Elitserien.

== Managerial career ==
For two seasons, Larsson was the joint-manager of Hammarby IF's football team in Allsvenskan together with Folke Adamsson, finishing 9th in the table in 1962 – before getting relegated in 11th place in 1963.

== Honours ==
=== Football ===
AIK

- Svenska Cupen: 1950
