= Hans Nell =

Swedish footballer

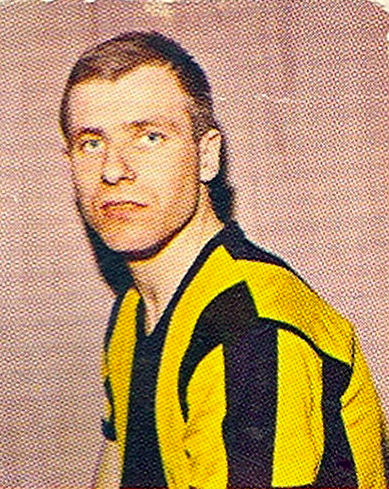
- Nell with Hammarby in 1963.

Personal information
- Full name: Hans Birger Gustav Nell
- Date of birth: 27 May 1931 (age 95)
- Place of birth: Upplands Väsby, Sweden
- Positions: Right back; centre-back; midfielder

Youth career
- Väsby IK

Senior career*
Years	Team	Apps	(Gls)
1950–1965	Hammarby IF	243	(13)
Total		243	(13)

International career
1954–1957	Sweden B	3	(0)
- * Club domestic league appearances and goals

Hans "Hasse" Nell (born 27 May 1931) is a Swedish former footballer who played for Hammarby IF his whole senior career.

== Career ==
Nell was born and grew up in Upplands Väsby and started to play football with local club Väsby IK as a youngster, before joining Stockholm-based Hammarby IF in 1950, at age 18.

In his first seasons with the club, Nell established himself as a starting midfielder for Hammarby in Division 2, Sweden's second tier. By 1954, when Hammarby won a promotion to Allsvenskan, Nell had started to struggle in the competition and manager Folke Adamsson subsequently started to play him as a right back.

The re-positioning proved to be successful; he won three caps for the Swedish national B team between 1954 and 1957, and got known as an aggressive and quick defender. During the later stages of his career, Nell also featured as a centre-back.

He went on to play seven nine seasons with Hammarby in Allsvenskan, mostly as a regular. In 1957–58, Hammarby spent one year in the second tier, where the team scored an impressive 117 goals in 33 fixtures throughout the season, getting instantly promoted. They also competed in the second division in 1964, a season when Nell was plagued by injuries.

Nell decided to retire after the 1965 Allsvenskan season. In total, he made 243 league appearances for Hammarby and scored 13 goals.
