= Steinke =

Steinke is a surname, and may refer to:

- Alfred Steinke (1881-1945), German ice hockey player
- Bill Steinke (contemporary), Canadian darts player
- Brad Steinke (contemporary), American sportscaster
- Darcey Steinke (b. 1964), American novelist and journalist
- Gerhard Steinke (contemporary), German sound engineer
- Gil Steinke (1919–1995), American football coach
- Jeremy Allan Steinke (born 1983), Canadian murderer
- Kersten Steinke (born 1958), German politician
- Oscar Steinke (born 2006), Swedish footballer
- Philipp Steinke (contemporary), German songwriter and musician
- René Steinke (actor) (b. 1963), German actor
- René Steinke (author) (contemporary), American novelist and poet
- Ronen Steinke (b. 1983), German author and journalist
