= Superstock =

Superstock, Super Stock or Superstocks may refer to:

- European Superstock 1000 Championship, defunct motorcycle racing series
- Superstock TT, motorcycle race at the Isle of Man TT
- Super Stock, a category of drag racing
- Superstocks, New Zealand dirt track car racing category
- The Super Stocks, American surf music band
- Superstox, British short oval car racing category
