= Hammarby IF Innebandy =

Swedish floorball club

Hammarby IF IBF
- Full name: Hammarby Idrottsförbund Innebandyförening
- Nickname(s): Bajen
- Founded: 1993(as a section under Hammarby IF); 1999 (as its own sportsclub)
- Arena: Sjöstadshallen, Stockholm
- Capacity: 200
- League: Swedish Division 4
- 2012/2013: 1st

Hammarby IF Innebandy, is a Swedish floorball club based at Stockholm. The men's first team currently plays in Division 4 which is the 6th tier level of the Swedish floorball league system, while the ladies' first team plays in "Damer Division 1" which is 2nd tier level. Hammarby IF Innebandy has about 217 licensed players today.

== History ==
Hammarby IF Innebandy was founded as a section under Hammarby IF by Ari Juustovaara in 1993. In 1999 there was reorganization in the association and all the sections under Hammarby IF got separated. They are still linked through Hammarby IF Alliansförening where the brand and the central register of members are handled.

The men's senior team played its first season in 1993/1994. The ladies senior team played their first season one year later, 1994/1995.
