= The Super Stocks =

- Genres: Surf
- Years active: 1964–1964
- Labels: Capitol

The Super Stocks were a California studio band created by Gary Usher in 1964 to capitalize on the popularity of surf music and hot rods. Usher's bands distinguished themselves from other studio creations by the quality of the session musicians – the Super Stocks made use of Wrecking Crew session musicians, including guitarist Glen Campbell. The band produced three albums on Capitol.

== Discography ==
- Thunder Road (January 1964, Capitol)
- Surf Route 101 (March 1964, Capitol)
- School Is a Drag (July 1964, Capitol)
