= Hammarby Fotboll =

Swedish football club

Hammarby
- Full name: Hammarby IF Fotbollförening
- Nickname: Bajen (Note: "Bajen" is a short form of a mock-English pronunciation of "Hammarby".)
- Short name: HIF
- Founded: 10 April 1889; 137 years ago (as Hammarby Roddförening); 13 August 1915; 111 years ago (football department)
- Ground: 3Arena, Stockholm
- Capacity: 30 000
- Owner(s): Hammarby IF Fotbollförening – 51% AEG – 23.5% Zlatan Ibrahimović – 23.5% Other – 2%
- Chairman: Mattias Fri
- Head coach: Henrik Rydström
- League: Allsvenskan
- 2025: Allsvenskan, 2nd of 16
- Website: www.hammarbyfotboll.se
Home colours	Away colours

Hammarby Fotboll, more commonly known as Hammarby IF or simply Hammarby (Swedish pronunciation: [ˈhâmːa(r)ˌbyː] or, especially locally, [-ˌbʏ]), is a Swedish professional football club from Stockholm founded in 1915. The club plays at 3 Arena in Johanneshov but was founded in the neighbouring Södermalm district of Stockholm City Centre, an area that is considered the club's heartland.

Competing in Sweden's first tier, Allsvenskan, Hammarby are placed eighth in the all-time Allsvenskan table, and has won the league once, in 2001. The club has competed in the Svenska Cupen final five times, winning their first title in 2021.

The club's colours are green and white, which are reflected in its crest and kit. Between 1918 and 1978, however, the club played in black-and-yellow striped home shirts, which since often form the club's away colors.

Hammarby is known for its vociferous fans. Drawing inspiration from England, in 1970 they introduced football chants to the Swedish terraces. Hammarby is one of largest football clubs in Europe in terms of the number of active players of all ages – with some 3,500 players in its organisation.

Hammarby is affiliated with the Stockholms Fotbollförbund (Stockholm Football Association).

== History ==
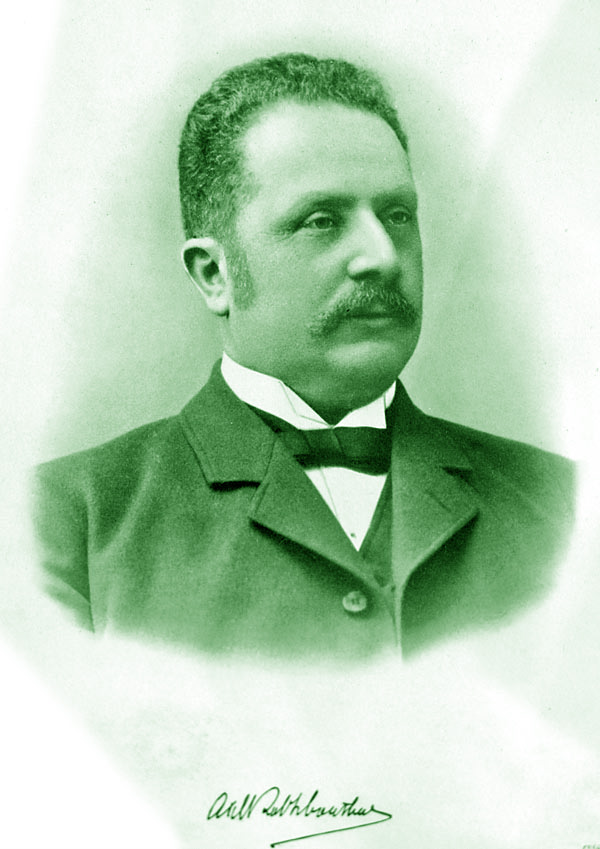
Axel Robert Schönthal is credited as the founding force of Hammarby Roddförening.

In 1889, Hammarby Roddförening ("Hammarby Rowing Association") was established in Södermalm, with engineer Axel Robert Schönthal, the first chairman, being credited as the founder. By 1897, it had diversified into different sports, and was renamed Hammarby Idrottsförening ("Hammarby Sports Club"), or Hammarby IF for short.

=== 1915–1940s: Establishment of football club ===
In 1915, the sporting ground Hammarby IP was built in Södermalm. Due to a lack of football pitches in Stockholm, several other clubs proposed to merge with Hammarby IF to get access to the stadium. An offer from Klara SK was accepted and Hammarby officially established a football department on 13 August 1915. The club played its first competitive game two days later, and won 5–0 against Västerås SK in the "Östsvenska serien", a local league, with Ragnar Gunnarsson scoring the inaugural goal. In 1916, Hammarby competed in Svenska Mästerskapet, a cup by then held to decide the Swedish Champions, for the first time. In 1918, Hammarby also merged with Johanneshofs IF, a club from the neighbouring district Johanneshov.

In 1920, Hammarby first competed in the Svenska Serien, by then the highest league in Swedish football, with key players like goalkeeper Victor Olsson, defender Gösta Wihlborg and forward Gustav Björk. During the upcoming years, Hammarby had a strong showing where they went to the finals of Svenska Mästerskapet in 1922, losing 1–3 to GAIS.

Hammarby qualified to compete in Allsvenskan's inaugural season in 1924. On 3 August said year, Rikard Larsson became Hammarby's first goalscorer in Allsvenskan, and also the first goalscorer in the league's history, in a 1–5 loss against Örgryte IS. The club would eventually finish last in the 1924–25 Allsvenskan, and were relegated to Division 2, which was then the second highest league in Sweden.

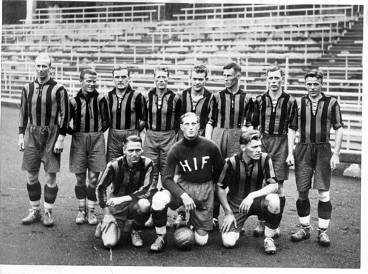
The Hammarby team of 1934.

During the upcoming years, Hammarby failed to produce any sort of challenge in Swedish football. Several star players emigrated to the United States, transferred to other clubs or opted to instead play ice hockey for Hammarby. In 1936–37 and 1937–38, the club won the second division, but lost the playoff matches that would have promoted them to Allsvenskan. Instead, Hammarby got promoted in 1938–39, where they knocked out IFK Norrköping following outstanding performances from goalkeeper and star player Sven Bergqvist.

Hammarby would, however, suffer from another relegation, finishing last in Allsvenskan in 1939–40. Back in Division 2, the club finished in the top four for the next six years. In the 1946–47 season, the club finished at the foot of the table, and because of a restructuring of the league system, the club got relegated to Division 4.

=== 1950s–1960s: A period of yo-yoing ===
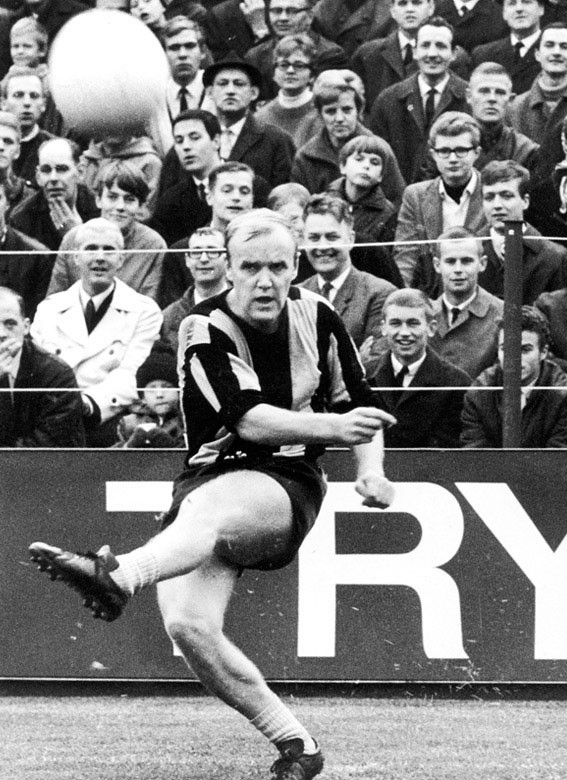
Nacka Skoglund was a renowned Hammarby player.

Hammarby did not return to the second highest league until the 1950–51 season. In the 1954–55 season, the club returned to Allsvenskan, but this time it finished sixth and managed to stay for another season. However, the club underwent yo-yoing, having been promoted and relegated between Allsvenskan and Division 2 seven times until 1970. Nacka Skoglund, one of the league's top players who played for Hammarby from 1944 to 1949, returned to Hammarby to play from 1964 to 1967. In his return debut, he landed a corner kick into the goal minutes into the match; in 1984, the club erected the Nackas Hörna (Nacka's corner) statue with his kick as the pose.

=== 1970s–1980s: Stable Allsvenskan years ===
In the 1970 Allsvenskan season, Hammarby had acquired only 3 points in the spring portion of the season, but during the autumn, showed a dramatic improvement. With star players Kenneth Ohlsson and Ronnie Hellström, and with a crowd that tried out supporter songs for the first time, the club went through the autumn half undefeated and finished in fifth place, its best showing in Allsvenskan. The club would stay in Allsvenskan through the rest of the 1970s, attracting large crowds, despite not returning above fifth place. Also in 1978, the club changed from black/yellow to green/white colours.

In the 1982 season, Swedish football introduced a playoff system for the top 8 teams in Allsvenskan to decide a champion. The playoffs consisted of two matches in which the aggregate score would determine who would advance. The club had placed second overall that season and had not lost a home game. After defeating Örgryte in the quarter-finals, and coming back from a 1–3 deficit to beat Elfsborg 4–3 in the semi-finals, Hammarby was in the final against IFK Göteborg. Hammarby won its away match 2–1, but lost 1–3 in its home match to a sold-out crowd. (Note: In 1982, IFK Göteborg, who won the Allsvenskan championship, would later go on to win the UEFA Cup, as the first, and so far only, Swedish team to do so.)

In the following year, Hammarby finished fifth in the league, but lost to AIK in the play-offs. In the Svenska Cupen tournament, Hammarby reached the finals but lost against IFK. However, since IFK qualified for the UEFA Cup that year, Hammarby qualified for the UEFA Cup Winners' Cup, its first major international competition, where the club lost to Finland's FC Haka in the second round. The Hammarby squads finished consistently in the top six in the league every year through 1987.

In 1988, Hammarby finished last in the standings and were relegated to the second tier. Although the club placed first in 1989, it finished last in 1990.

=== 1990s–2000s: Tough nineties, restructuring, champions ===
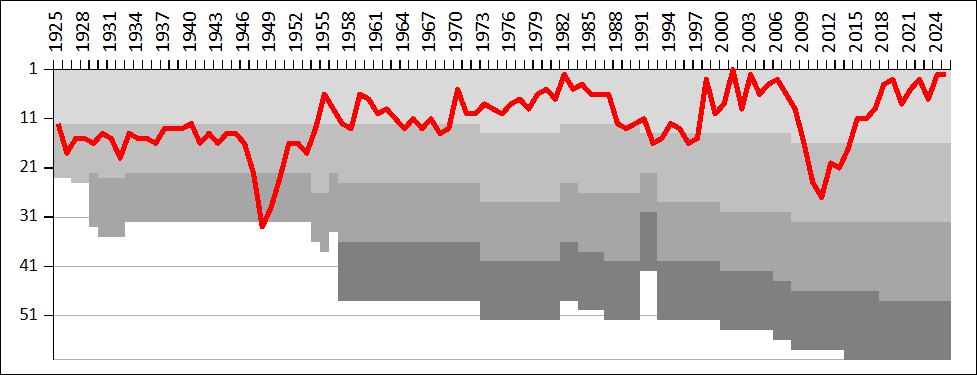
A chart showing the progress of Hammarby IF through the Swedish football league system. The different shades of grey represent the various league tiers.

Hammarby would stay in the second tier in 1991 and 1992, but in 1993, the team finished in first place and were promoted to Allsvenskan. In 1995 Allsvenskan, the team finished last and were relegated, but returned to the 1998 Allsvenskan with a third-place finish.

Championship-winning 2001 Allsvenskan starting lineup

Prior to the 2001 Allsvenskan season, the club had financially tough times, leading experts to conclude that the team was weak, and one journalist predicted a last place finish. Halfway through the 2001 season, manager Sören Cratz was informed that his contract would not be extended because the club's board wanted Hammarby to play a positive, attacking and fun football, something the board did not think that Cratz did. (Note: Cratz would later be cheered upon and praised by Hammarby fans in 2002 when he managed Swedish competing team Helsingborgs IF in a match against Hammarby.) However, the club took the lead in the standings and in the second-to-last match, which was against Örgryte IS on 21 October, the club won 3–2 and secured its first ever Allsvenskan championship.

Hammarby stayed in Allsvenskan for the rest of the 2000s: In 2003 Allsvenskan the club finished second, and participated in the second qualifying and first rounds of the 2004–05 UEFA Cup. In 2006 Allsvenskan, Hammarby placed third overall and advanced to the UEFA Intertoto Cup, where they won their third round match, which advanced the team to the second qualifying and first rounds of the 2007–08 UEFA Cup.

In 2007, Bajen finished on the sixth place, and didn't qualify for any European cups. In 2008, Hammarby finished ninth, but 2009 was a disastrous year where the team finished last in the league and was relegated to the second tier known as Superettan.

=== 2010–2014: Superettan ===
The 2010 Superettan was a letdown for supporters who had hoped to make the visit to Sweden's second tier short, as the team finished 8th. In the 2010 Svenska Cupen, Hammarby fared better, winning against multiple Allsvenskan opponents, until the finals where the team lost 0–1 to Helsingborgs IF. In the 2011 Superettan season, the club finished in a tie for 11th, its worst overall ranking in 64 years. The club was almost relegated to the third tier, until a game-winning kick in the season's final match against Ängelholm. After the season of 2011, Hammarby dismantled their development team HTFF, which was established in 2003. In 2012 Superettan, the club finished fourth, and in 2013 Superettan the club finished fifth. In 2014, in the last round of the season, Hammarby were promoted to the first tier, Allsvenskan, by finishing first in Superettan.

=== 2015–: Top-flight comeback and cup title ===
The 2015 season started off well, with Hammarby managing an impressive 1–2 away win against local rivals AIK in the 2015 Swedish Cup, which also was the first Stockholm derby involving Hammarby since 2009. This was followed up with a 2–0 win in the season opener against BK Häcken, and in the fourth round Hammarby defeated their other local rivals Djurgårdens IF with 2–1. The summer was, however, tougher for the club, with Hammarby playing 10 consecutive league games without winning, before managing to defeat Falkenbergs FF at home with 3–0. Eventually, Hammarby finished at 11th place in their first Allsvenskan season since 2009.

The 2016 and 2017 seasons showed only a slight improvement for Hammarby, with the team ending in the 11th and 9th position respectively. Hammarby fared better in the local derbys. In 2016 Hammarby defeated the local rival Djurgården in all three fixtures. In 2017 the first encounter ended with a draw and the second with a Hammarby victory. The second local rival, AIK, managed to defeat Hammarby by 3–0 in the first encounter in the league and a draw (0–0) in the second. Hammarby however beat AIK in the Swedish cup, earlier in the year. In 2017 the Hammarby – AIK encounters ended with one Hammarby win and one draw. Both Djurgården and AIK, however, fared much better overall than Hammarby in the league.

The club fared much better in 2018 under the reign of new manager Stefan Billborn, finishing 4th in the league. In 2019, Hammarby started the league play in a mediocre fashion, but made a strong finish to the season (with eight straight wins in the final eight games of the season) and ultimately finished 3rd in Allsvenskan. This meant that the club qualified for the 2020–21 UEFA Europa League, their first continental competition in over ten years.

Hammarby IF won the 2020–21 Svenska Cupen, their first title in the main domestic cup, through a 5–4 win on penalties (0–0 after full-time) against BK Häcken in the final. On 11 June 2021, Hammarby decided to terminate manager Stefan Billborn's contract, with the club placed 8th in the 2021 Allsvenskan table after eight rounds. On 13 June, Miloš Milojević, most recently an assistant at Red Star Belgrade, was appointed new head coach. Under the leadership of Milojević, Hammarby nearly reached the group stages of the first edition of the UEFA Conference League, only being defeated on penalties by FC Basel in the playoff. Nevertheless, Milojević was fired following the conclusion of the 2021 Allsvenskan, and Martí Cifuentes was hired as head coach in January 2022.

Cifuentes led the club to a 3rd-place finish in the 2022 Allsvenskan. On 30 October 2023, with two fixtures left of the 2023 season, he left the club for Queens Park Rangers. Hammarby ended the season in 7th place.

On 14 December 2023, Kim Hellberg was announced as the new head coach of Hammarby IF, signing a three-year contract. He led the club to consecutive second-place finishes in the league. On 24 November 2025, Hellberg was appointed head coach of EFL Championship club Middlesbrough, with the club reportedly paying around £250,000 in compensation to release him from his contract at Hammarby.

== Colours, badge and kit ==
=== Colours and badge ===
When Hammarby Roddförening (Hammarby RF) was founded in 1889, the club's crest consisted of a white flag with three green horizontal lines. It drew inspiration from two other competing rowing clubs in Stockholm that used two blue and two red lines respectively on a white flag, but chose the colour green to represent "hope". Hammarby eventually added a third stripe when it discovered that Göteborgs RF used a similar green-white flag with two stripes.

=== Kit ===
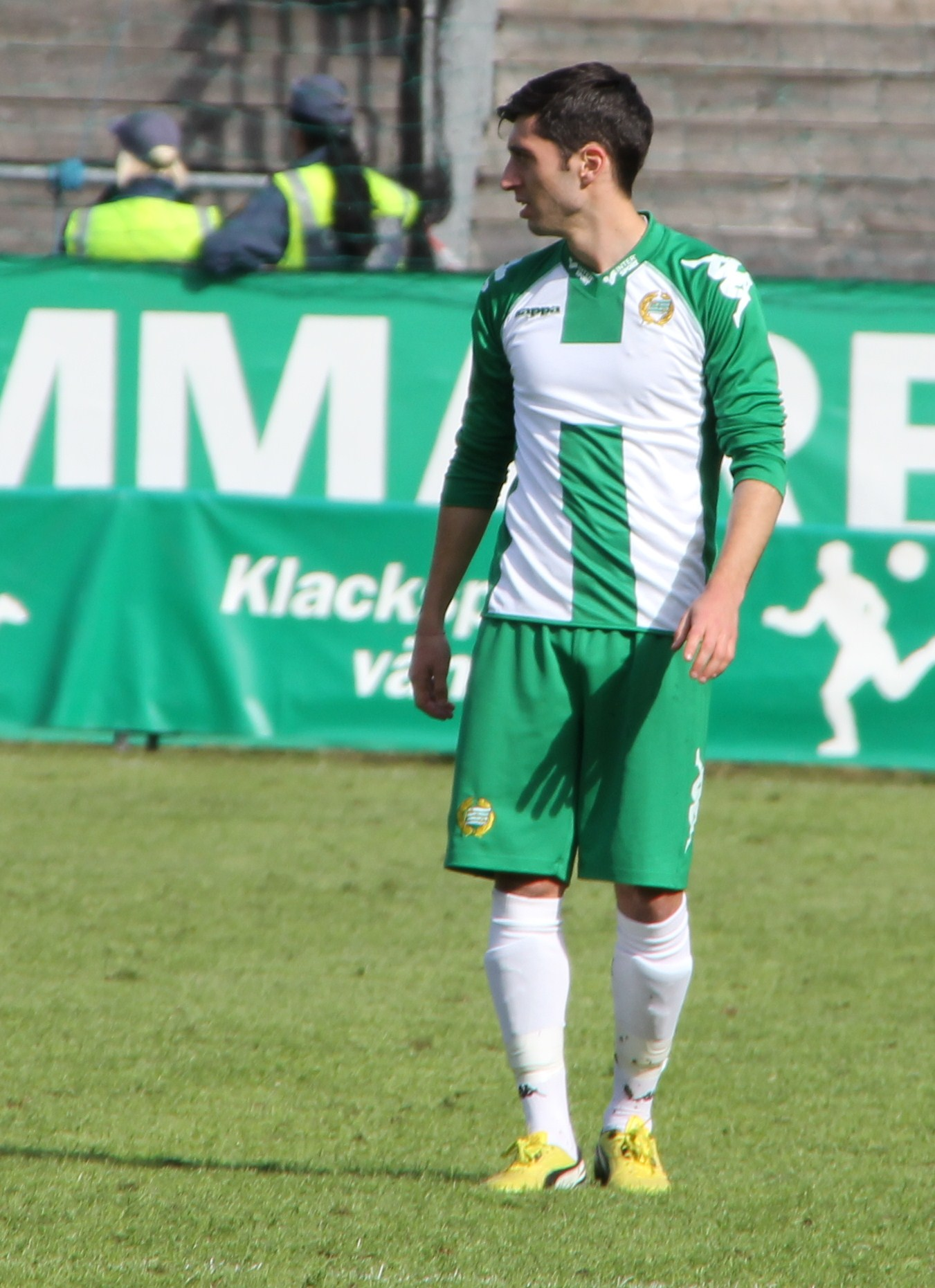
Hammarby midfielder Nahir Besara wearing the 2013 home kit.

When Hammarby IF founded its football club in 1915, it determined the kit to be the following: a white hat with a five-pointed green star, a white shirt with "HIF" on its chest, white shorts and black socks. Following the merger with Johanneshovs IF in 1918, the club changed its football team apparel to Johanneshov's black-and-yellow striped shirts, blue shorts and black socks with yellow stripes. The first department to use the new kit was Hammarby Bandy, with the football department adopting it soon thereafter.

In the 1960s, the club changed from blue shorts to black. When "Nacka" Skoglund rejoined the club in 1964, he donated the club a set of black shorts because he thought the team's blue shorts looked awful.

In 1978, 60 years after the merger with Johanneshov, Hammarby changed its home colours from black and yellow to white shirts, green shorts and white socks. In 1997, the striped shirts returned, but with green and white colours, with green shorts and white socks. The yellow and black colours were retained for the away and third kits. Since 1997, only a few exceptions have been made to the green-and-white-striped home and the black-and-yellow-striped away shirts: In 2002 and 2014–2016, the team wore all-white jerseys, and in 2011 the team wore an all-grey away kit.

=== Sponsors ===
Craft is Hammarby's kit manufacturer. Also visible on the club's kit are the logos of the following sponsors: workwear clothing company Projob; automaker Volkswagen; sporting-goods retailer Intersport; solar cell supplier Sesol; Köket & Gården, a vegetable-and-fruit delivery company; BST, a transportation company; pawnbroker Digipant; Clinton, a construction-measurement company; and league sponsors Unibet, a gambling company (whose logo is on the right sleeve of the shirts of all Allsvenskan teams).

Period	Kit manufacturer	Shirt sponsor (chest)
1978	(Germany) Adidas	None
1979	(Germany) Adidas	Minolta
1980–1985	(Germany) Adidas	1x2
1986–1987	(Germany) Adidas	ICL
1988–1989	(Germany) Adidas	ICA Handlarna or Oddset
1990–1991	(United States) Nike	Oddset
1992–1993	(England) Mitre	Oddset
1994–1995	(Germany) Puma	Oddset
1996–1998	(Germany) Puma	Folksam or Oddset
1999	(Germany) Puma	Folksam or Falcon
2000–2001	(Germany) Puma	Folksam, Falcon or Kungsörnen
2002–2003	(Germany) Puma	Coop
2004–2005	(Germany) Puma	Siemens
2005–2006	(Italy) Kappa	Siemens
2006	(Italy) Kappa	BenQ-Siemens
2007	(United States) Nike	UNICEF
2008–2009	(United States) Nike	Finlux
2010–2011	(United States) Nike	Pepsi
2011	(Italy) Kappa	Pepsi
2012	(Italy) Kappa	None
2013	(Italy) Kappa	Herbalife
2014	(Italy) Kappa	Herbalife
2015–2017	(Germany) Puma	LW
2018	(Germany) Puma	Jobman Workwear
2019–2020	(Sweden) Craft	Jobman Workwear
2021–2023	(Sweden) Craft	Huski Chocolate
2024–	(Sweden) Craft	Projob Workwear

== Ownership and finance ==
=== Ownership ===
Hammarby IF was reorganised as an umbrella organisation in 1999, with each of the individual sports departments breaking off to form independent clubs; the football club was then named Hammarby IF Fotbollförening (Hammarby IF FF).

In 2001, the football club split the A team, B team and youth team into separate legal entities. A limited company called Hammarby Fotboll AB was founded, in which the parent football club owns a majority stake. In Sweden, all sport teams in the league systems are regulated to be non-profit associations, which means that a majority of the voting rights, according to the "51 percent-rule", is controlled by the members of the club.

Anschutz Entertainment Group (AEG), the founder and owner of Major League Soccer club LA Galaxy, was the biggest external investor and minority shareholder of Hammarby Fotboll AB between 2001 and 2019.

On 27 November 2019, it was announced that Zlatan Ibrahimović, widely regarded to be the greatest Swedish football player of all time, had acquired 23.5 percent of the outstanding shares in Hammarby, which meant that AEG reduced their stake by half.

=== Finance ===
At the end of 2022, the club held an equity of 115,6 million SEK. The turnover for 2022 was 316,3 million SEK.

The highest transfer fee received by Hammarby for a player was reportedly 50 million SEK for Williot Swedberg who was sold to RC Celta de Vigo in 2022, followed by 46 million SEK for Akinkunmi Amoo who left for F.C. Copenhagen in 2022, 44 million SEK for Odilon Kossounou who transferred to Club Brugge in 2019, and 30 million SEK for Aziz Ouattara Mohammed who was signed by Genk in 2022.

== Supporters ==
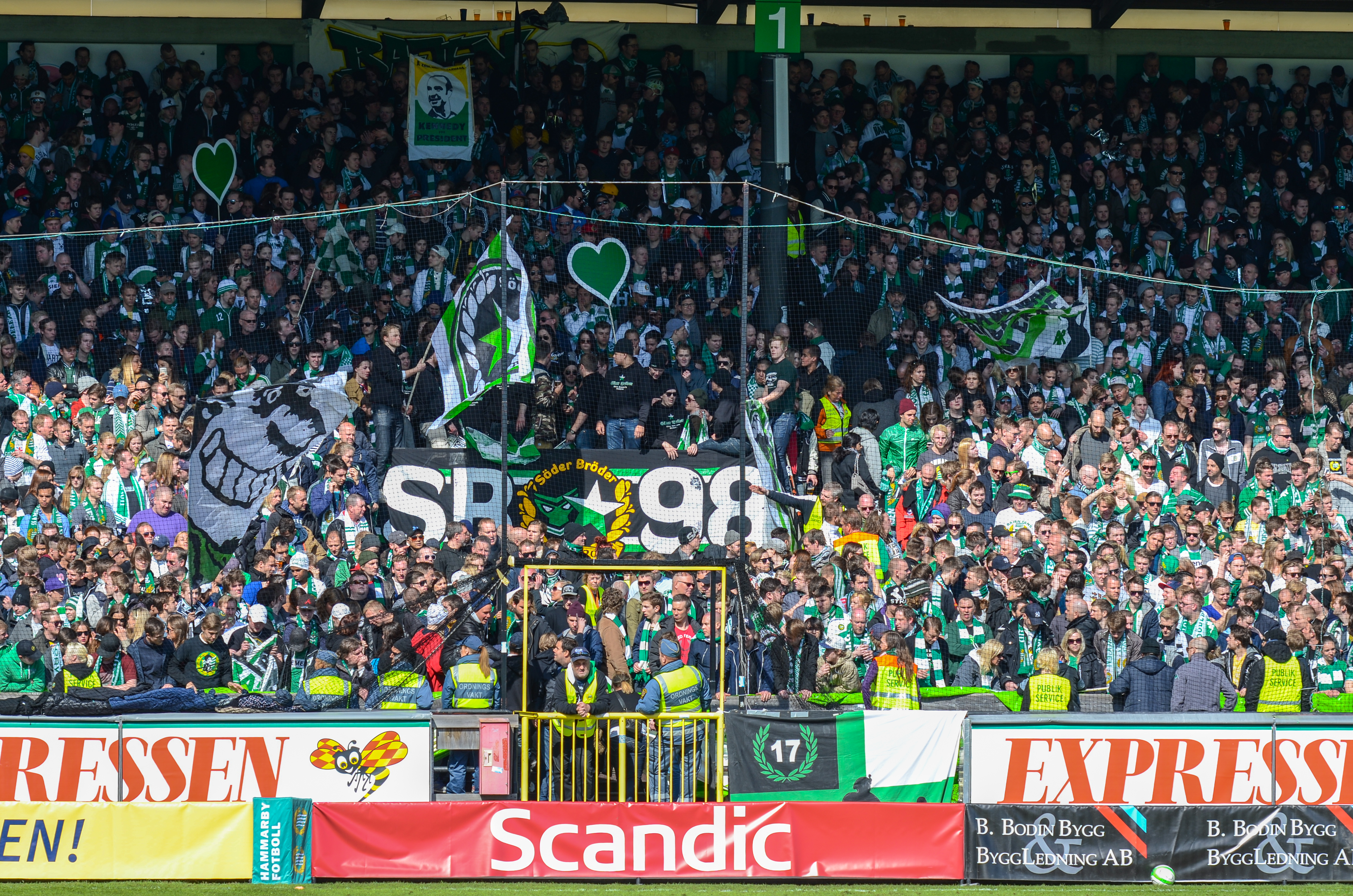
Hammarby supporters during a home game against IFK Värnamo in 2013.

The club's nickname is "Bajen" (Swedish pronunciation: [ˈbǎjɛn]). A fan of Hammarby is referred to as a bajare or a hammarbyare.

Hammarby has historically been regarded as a club with a mainly working-class fan base, due to its connection with the formerly working-class (but today gentrified) Södermalm district of Stockholm. Nowadays the club attracts fans from all parts of society. According to a 2016 poll, a large part of the club's fan base tends to support left-wing politics compared to those of their local rivals AIK and Djurgården.

Hammarby has strong ties to Söderort, the southern part of Stockholm urban area. A 2012 poll showed that Hammarby was the most popular club in Söderort; 40 percent of the area's residents who had a favourite club chose Hammarby.

Hammarby's training ground, Årsta Idrottsplats, is located in the district of Johanneshov, while some of the older youth teams still play at Hammarby IP in Södermalm.

=== Rivalries ===
The club's main rivals are Djurgårdens IF and AIK, also from the Stockholm urban area. Hammarby and Djurgården have been tenants at the same arena, 3Arena, since 2013.

=== Attendances ===
].

The club's average attendance for the 2015 season was 25,507, at the time a record for Swedish top-division football. The former record was set back in 1959, when Örgryte IS had an average home attendance of 25,490. In 2022, Hammarby broke a new Allsvenskan record, drawing an average attendance of 26,372 which their rivals AIK broke 2024 and later 2025 with an average attendance of 30024

=== Notable supporters ===
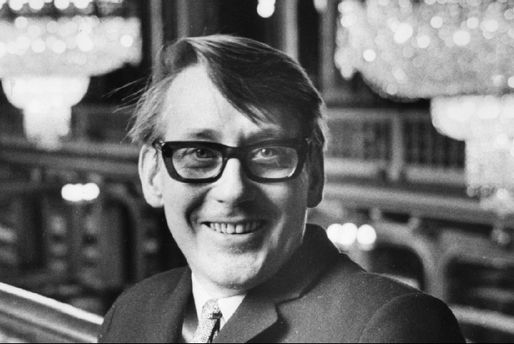
Writer and illustrator Stig "Slas" Claesson (1928–2008), a prominent supporter of Hammarby.

Hammarby has had a slew of celebrity fans throughout the years, mostly cultural professionals living in Södermalm. In 1942, the popular recording artist Alice Babs released a version of the song Vårat gäng ("Our Gang") with new, Hammarby-related lyrics. Critically acclaimed author Per Anders Fogelström, who rose to fame with his 1960 novel Mina drömmars stad ("City of My Dreams"), with a narrative that follows a group of working-class people in Södermalm between 1860 and 1880, was also a supporter of Hammarby. In 1962, writer and illustrator Stig "Slas" Claesson penned a short story, Supportern ("The Supporter"), about his love for the club.

Hollywood actors Alexander Skarsgård and Joel Kinnaman are supporters of Hammarby, and have starred in several skits to promote the club.

=== Club culture ===
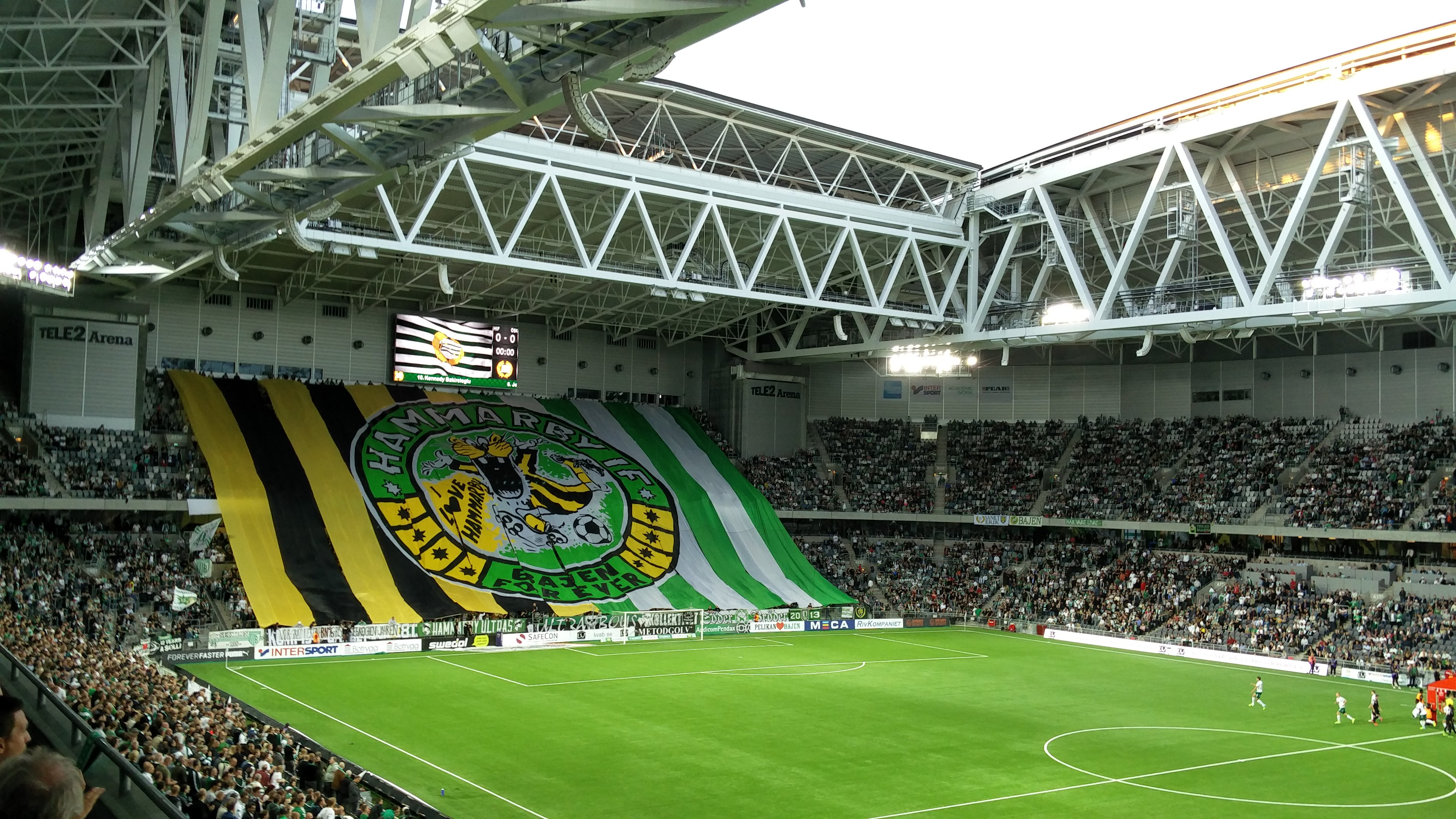
A terrace choreography from Hammarby supporters during a game against Örebro SK in 2016.

The club's unofficial hymn is "Just idag är jag stark". Released in 1979, it was performed and co-written by Kenta Gustafsson, who was a notable Hammarby fan. The recording has been the team's entrance music since 2004.

Hammarby has several supporter clubs, the largest of which, Bajen Fans, had over 6,000 members in 2012 and is one of the largest in Scandinavia. Hammarby also has a number of ultras such as Hammarby Ultras, Ultra Boys, Söder Bröder, and E1 Ultras – who together organize the club's terrace choreography. Hammarby Ultras won "tifo of the year" in both 2000 and 2005, an award handed out by the Swedish Football Association.

The club is known for its vociferous fans. Drawing inspiration from England, Hammarby fans introduced football chants to the Swedish terraces in 1970. In the 1982 finals against IFK Göteborg, Hammarby supporters attracted much attention for bringing a live samba band to the stands to accompany their chants, inspired by supporters in South America. In 2008, sports broadcaster Setanta Sports listed Söderstadion, Hammarby's home ground at the time, as the 11th noisiest stadium in the world.

Before the league's first home game of the season, Hammarby fans gather at Medborgarplatsen in Södermalm. They then march together along Götgatan and cross the Skanstullsbron bridge before arriving at the stadium in Johanneshov. This tradition has taken place since 1998 and annually attracts between 15,000 and 20,000 supporters.

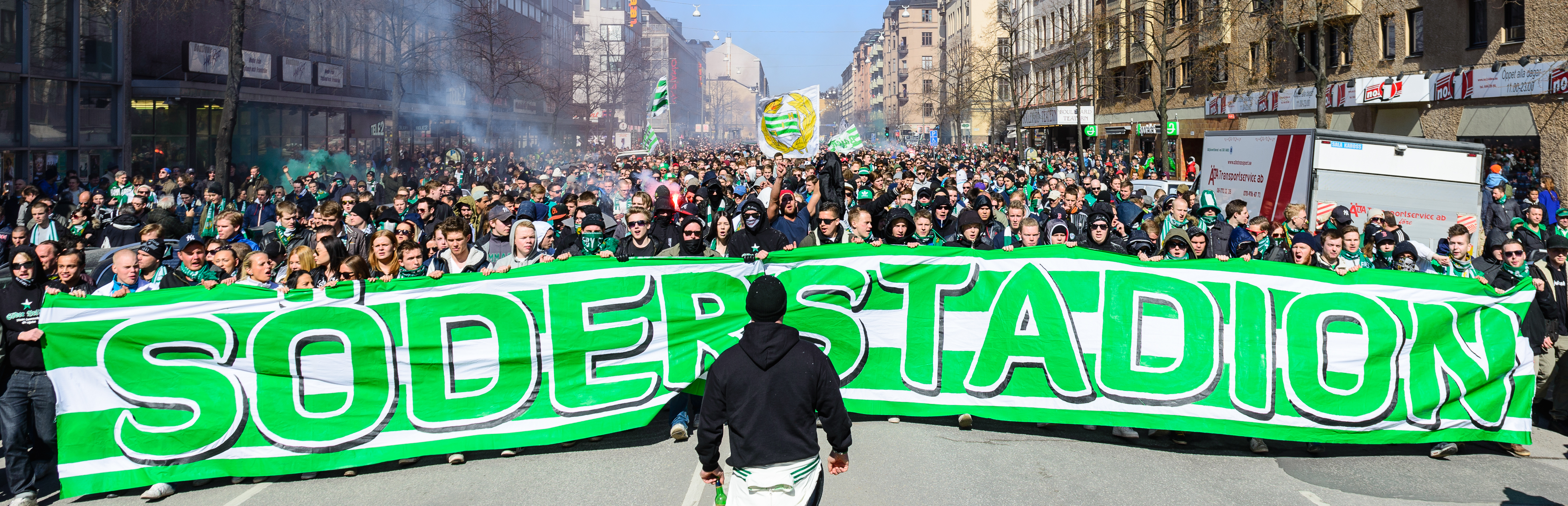
Hammarby supporters during the annual opening day march to the stadium.

== Players ==
=== First-team squad ===
As of 24 August 2026

Note: Flags indicate national team as defined under FIFA eligibility rules; some limited exceptions apply. Players may hold more than one non-FIFA nationality.

No.	Pos.	Nation	Player
1	GK	SUR	Warner Hahn
2	DF	SWE	Hampus Skoglund
3	DF	DEN	Frederik Winther
4	DF	SWE	Victor Eriksson
5	MF	ERI	Tesfaldet Tekie
6	DF	GUI	Ibrahima Breze Fofana
7	FW	SWE	Paulos Abraham
8	MF	SWE	Markus Karlsson
9	FW	DEN	Victor Lind
11	MF	SWE	Oscar Johansson Schellhas
15	FW	NOR	Oliver Jordan Hagen
16	DF	SWE	Noah Persson

No.	Pos.	Nation	Player
17	MF	SWE	Amin Boudri
20	MF	SWE	Nahir Besara (captain)
21	MF	CIV	Sourou Koné
24	DF	RSA	Waylon Renecke
25	GK	SWE	Elton Fischerström
26	FW	IRQ	Montader Madjed
27	GK	SWE	Felix Jakobsson
28	MF	GHA	Frank Adjei
30	FW	GAM	Suwaibou Kebbeh
31	DF	SWE	Oscar Steinke
32	DF	SWE	Essayas Lwampindy Bofua
33	DF	SWE	Björn Hedlöf

=== Out on loan ===
As of 12 August 2026

Note: Flags indicate national team as defined under FIFA eligibility rules; some limited exceptions apply. Players may hold more than one non-FIFA nationality.

No.	Pos.	Nation	Player
7	FW	MNE	Viktor Đukanović (at ETO Győr until 30 June 2027)
13	DF	SWE	Jonathan Karlsson (at Västerås SK until 31 December 2026)

No.	Pos.	Nation	Player
29	FW	BFA	Elohim Kaboré (at Beveren until 30 June 2027)

=== Youth players with first-team experience ===
As of 5 January 2026 (Note: Current youth players who at least have sat on the bench in a competitive match.)

Note: Flags indicate national team as defined under FIFA eligibility rules; some limited exceptions apply. Players may hold more than one non-FIFA nationality.

No. / Pos. / Nation / Player	No. / Pos. / Nation / Player

=== Retired numbers ===
Note: Flags indicate national team as defined under FIFA eligibility rules; some limited exceptions apply. Players may hold more than one non-FIFA nationality.

No.	Pos.	Nation	Player
10	MF	SWE	Kennedy Bakircioglu (until 2029)
12	12		Fans of the club

=== Notable players ===
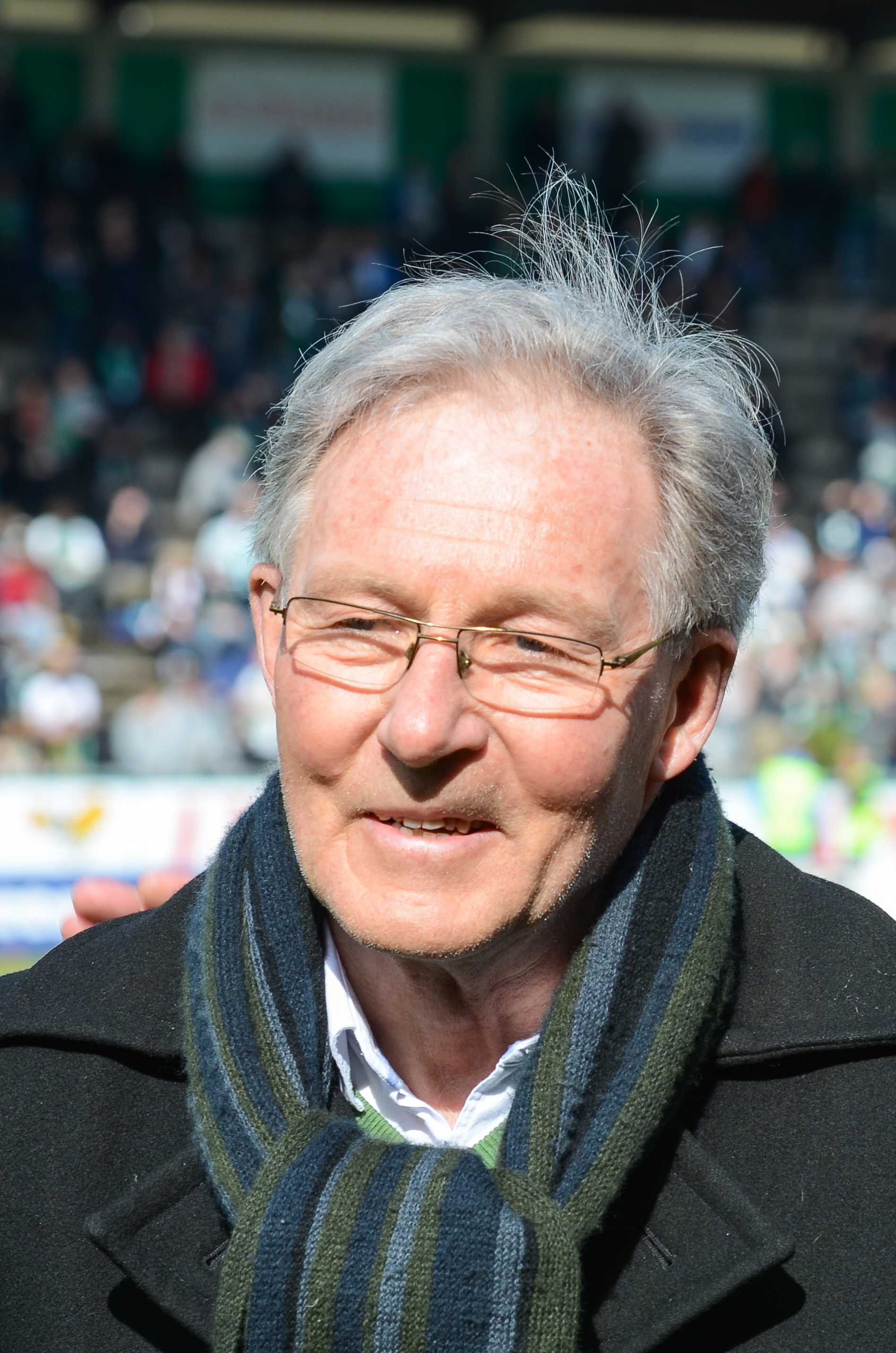
Kenneth Ohlsson is the player with the most appearances for Hammarby with 396 matches.

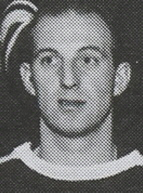
Sven Bergqvist earned 35 caps for the Swedish national team between 1935 and 1943.

List criteria:

- player has made more than 300 appearances overall for the club, or
- player has won Guldbollen, is a member of the Swedish football Hall of Fame, has been named Allsvenskan top scorer of the year, or
- player has been picked as a top ten club profile, decided by the supporters in 2004 in an official voting called "Tidernas största Bajenprofiler".

Name	Nationality	Hammarby Fotboll career	Total appearances	Total goals	Guldbollen	Hall of Fame	Allsvenskan top goalscorer	Top ten club profile
Sven Bergqvist	Sweden	1932–1946	212	0				Yes
Lennart Skoglund	Sweden	1946–1949; 1964–1967	113	28		Yes		Yes
Ronnie Hellström	Sweden	1966–1974	169	0	1971; 1978	Yes		Yes
Kenneth Ohlsson	Sweden	1966–1983	396	83				Yes
Mats Werner	Sweden	1971–1984	251	46			1979	
Billy Ohlsson	Sweden	1972–1978; 1980–1986	219	94			1980; 1984	Yes
Klas Johansson	Sweden	1975–1989	312	6				Yes
Ulf Eriksson	Sweden	1979–1983; 1985–1989	176	55				Yes
Sten-Ove Ramberg	Sweden	1979–1989	250	14				Yes
Lars Eriksson	Sweden	1985–1988; 1998–2001	123	0				Yes
Mikael Hellström	Sweden	1990–2005	301	18				
Kennedy Bakircioglu	Sweden	1999–2003; 2012–2018	269	79				Yes

== Management ==
=== Organisation ===
As of 8 April 2026

Position	Staff
Chairman	(Sweden) Mattias Fri
Chief executive officer	(Sweden) Richard von Yxkull
Deputy chief executive officer	(Sweden) Markus Nilsson
Sporting director	(Sweden) Mikael Hjelmberg
Technical director	(Sweden) Adrian von Heijne
Head of scouting	(Sweden) Philip Berglund
Head of youth academy	(Sweden) Jocke Rydberg
Head of youth recruitment	(Sweden) Atilla Börjeson

=== Technical staff ===
As of 7 July 2026

Name	Role
(Sweden) Henrik Rydström	Head coach
(Sweden) Theodor Olsson	Assistant coaches
(Sweden) Fredrik Samuelsson	Assistant coaches
(Sweden) Douglas Jakobsen	Assistant coaches
(Serbia) Vedran Vucicevic	Assistant coaches
(Sweden) Martin Sundgren	Transition coach
(England) Liam Watkins	Fitness coaches
(Sweden) Gustav Pettersson	Fitness coaches
(Sweden) Olle Ekman	Fitness coaches
(Sweden) Dusan Babic	Goalkeeping coach
(Sweden) Carl Carlsson	Physiotherapists
(Sweden) Tim Altmark	Physiotherapists
(Sweden) Stefan Tanda	Physiotherapists
(Sweden) Elias Morin	Naprapat
(Sweden) Ange-Désiré Obrou	Sports assistant
(Sweden) Atena Gerontidou	Team manager
(Sweden) Adam Bulduk	Equipment managers
(Sweden) Anders Bitén	Equipment managers

=== Coaching history ===
Years	Coach
1920	(England) Harry Butterworth
1922	(Sweden) Sven Johansson
1923–1924	(Austria-Hungary) Willy Meisl
1936–1937	(Sweden) Olle Holking
1938–1939	(Sweden) Willy Wolf
1939–1940	(Sweden) Gustaf Martinsson
1940–1944	(Sweden) Per Kaufeldt
1944–1946	(Sweden) Sven Bergqvist
1947–1950	(Sweden) Folke Adamsson
1951	(Sweden) Åke Andersson (Sweden) Folke Adamsson
1951–1961	(Sweden) Folke Adamsson
1962–1963	(Sweden) Rune Larsson (Sweden) Folke Adamsson
1964–1965	(Sweden) Folke Adamsson
1966	(Sweden) Georg Kraemer
1967–1971	(Sweden) Lars-Gösta Hall
1972	(Sweden) Jan Holmberg
1973–1974	(Sweden) Olle Nyström
1975–1977	(Sweden) Björn Bolling
1978	(Sweden) Tom Turesson
1979–1981	(Sweden) Bengt Gustavsson
1982–1984	(Sweden) Bengt Persson
1985	(Sweden) Björn Bolling
1986	(Sweden) Lars Wass
1987–1988	(Sweden) Hans Backe
1989–1992	(Sweden) Kenneth Ohlsson

Years	Manager
1993–1995	(Sweden) Tommy Davidsson
1996	(Sweden) Göran Göransson
1997–1999	(Sweden) Rolf Zetterlund
1999–2001	(Sweden) Sören Cratz
2002–2006	(Sweden) Anders Linderoth
2007–2009	(Sweden) Tony Gustavsson
2009	(Sweden) Thom Åhlund (caretaker)
2010	(Sweden) Michael Borgqvist
2010	(Sweden) Jesper Blomqvist (caretaker)
2010–2011	(Sweden) Roger Franzén
2011	(Sweden) Roger Sandberg (caretaker)
2012–2013	(United States) Gregg Berhalter
2013	(Sweden) Thomas Dennerby (caretaker)
2014–2016	(Sweden) Nanne Bergstrand
2017–2018	(Denmark) Jakob Michelsen
2018–2021	(Sweden) Stefan Billborn
2021	(Serbia) Miloš Milojević
2022–2023	(Spain) Martí Cifuentes
2023	(Hungary) Ábel Lőrincz (caretaker)
2024–2025	(Sweden) Kim Hellberg
2026	(Sweden) Kalle Karlsson
2026–	(Sweden) Henrik Rydström

== Honours ==
=== Domestic ===
- Swedish Champions (Note: The title of "Swedish Champions" has been awarded to the winner of four different competitions over the years. Between 1896 and 1925, the title was awarded to the winner of Svenska Mästerskapet, a stand-alone cup tournament. No club were given the title between 1926 and 1930 even though the first-tier league Allsvenskan was played. In 1931, the title was reinstated and awarded to the winner of Allsvenskan. Between 1982 and 1990, a play-off in cup format was held at the end of the league season to decide the champions. After the play-off format in 1991 and 1992, the title was decided by the winner of Mästerskapsserien, an additional league after the end of Allsvenskan. Since the 1993 season, the title has once again been awarded to the winner of Allsvenskan.)
  - Winners (1): 2001

==== League ====
- Allsvenskan
  - Winners (1): 2001
  - Runners-up (4): 1982, 2003, 2024, 2025
- Superettan
  - Winners (1): 2014
- Division 1 Norra
  - Winners (3): 1989, 1993, 1997
  - Runners-up (1): 1996
- Division 1 Östra
  - Winners (1): 1991

==== Cups ====
- Svenska Cupen
  - Winners (1): 2020–21
  - Runners-up (4): 1976–77, 1982–83, 2010, 2021–22, 2025-26
- Svenska Mästerskapet
  - Runners-up (1): 1922

==== European ====
- UEFA Intertoto Cup
  - Winners (1): 2007 (Joint Winner)
- Intertoto Cup
  - Winners (1): 1983 (Outright Winner)

== International play ==
=== European games ===
Hammarby has occasionally qualified for play in competitions where the team has competed with clubs from other European countries.

Season	Competition	Round	Club	Home	Away	Agg.	Notes
1983–84	UEFA Cup Winners' Cup	R1	(Albania) 17 Nëntori	4–0	1–2	5–2	
1983–84	UEFA Cup Winners' Cup	R2	(Finland) Haka	1–1	1–2	2–3	
1985–86	UEFA Cup	R1	(Bulgaria) Pirin Blagoevgrad	3–1	4–0	7–1	
1985–86	UEFA Cup	R2	(Scotland) St Mirren	3–3	2–1	5–4	
1985–86	UEFA Cup	R3	(West Germany) 1. FC Köln	2–1	1–3	3–4	
1999	UEFA Intertoto Cup	R2	(Belarus) FC Gomel	4–0	2–2	6–2	
1999	UEFA Intertoto Cup	R3	(Netherlands) Heerenveen	0–2	0–2	0–4	
2002–03	UEFA Champions League	QR2	(Serbia and Montenegro) Partizan	1–1	0–4	1–5	
2004–05	UEFA Cup	QR2	(Iceland) ÍA	2–0	2–1	4–1	
2004–05	UEFA Cup	R1	(Spain) Villarreal	1–2	0–3	1–5	
2007	UEFA Intertoto Cup	R1	(Faroe Islands) Klaksvík	1–0	2–1	3–1	
2007	UEFA Intertoto Cup	R2	(Republic of Ireland) Cork City	1–1	1–0	2–1	
2007	UEFA Intertoto Cup	R3	(Netherlands) Utrecht	0–0	1–1	1–1 (a)	Winner
2007–08	UEFA Cup	QR2	(Norway) Fredrikstad	2–1	1–1	3–2	
2007–08	UEFA Cup	R1	(Portugal) Braga	2–1	0–4	2–5	
2020–21	UEFA Europa League	QR1	(Hungary) Puskás Akadémia	3–0	—N/a	—N/a	
2020–21	UEFA Europa League	QR2	(Poland) Lech Poznań	0–3	—N/a	—N/a	
2021–22	UEFA Europa Conference League	QR2	(Slovenia) Maribor	3–1	1–0	4–1	
2021–22	UEFA Europa Conference League	QR3	(Serbia) Čukarički	5–1	1–3	6–4	
2021–22	UEFA Europa Conference League	PO	(Switzerland) Basel	3–1 (a.e.t.)	1–3	4–4 (3–4 p)	
2023–24	UEFA Europa Conference League	QR2	(Netherlands) Twente	1–1 (a.e.t.)	0–1	1–2	
2025–26	UEFA Conference League	QR2	(Belgium) Charleroi	0–0	2–1 (a.e.t.)	2–1	
2025–26	UEFA Conference League	QR3	(Norway) Rosenborg	0–1	0–0	0–1	
2026–27	UEFA Europa League	QR2	(Belgium) Anderlecht	1–1	1–3	2–4	
2026–27	UEFA Conference League	QR3	(Poland) Raków Częstochowa	0–1	0–0	0–1	

== Records ==
- Highest attendance, Råsunda Stadium: 35,929 (against IFK Lidingö, 14 September 1941)
- Highest attendance, Tele2 Arena: 31,810 (against BK Häcken, 4 November 2018)
- Highest attendance, Söderstadion: 22,000 (against IFK Göteborg, 31 October 1982)
- Biggest win, Allsvenskan: 7–0 (against Halmstad BK, 1 October 1972); 7–0 (against Enköpings SK, 29 September 2003)
- Biggest loss, Allsvenskan: 1–9 (against Djurgårdens IF, 13 August 1990); 0–8 (against IFK Göteborg, 2 June 1925)
- Most goals scored, Allsvenskan: 94, Billy Ohlsson (1972–86)
- Most appearances (including non-league), total: 400, Kenneth "Kenta" Ohlsson (1966–83)

== Other departments ==
=== Women ===
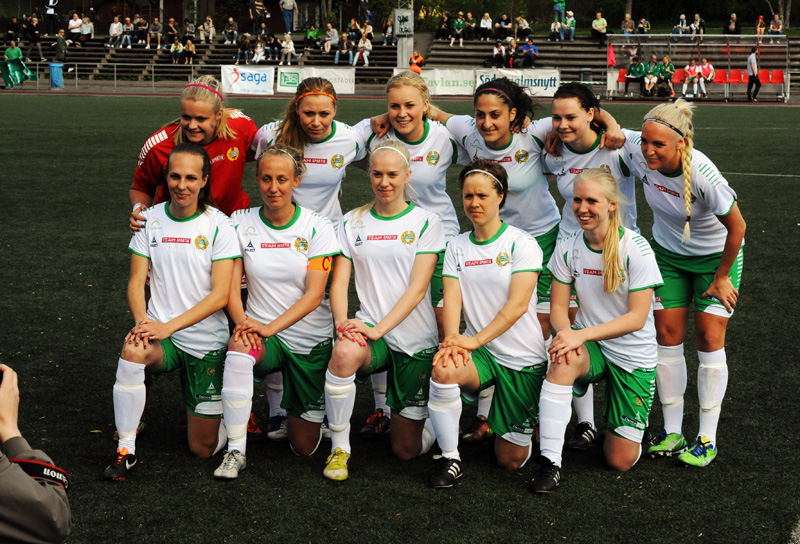
Before a match with Älta IF in 2013

Hammarby IF DFF are the women's football club affiliated to Hammarby Fotboll. Hammarby Damfotbollförening was first founded in 1970 as a section under Hammarby IF. In 1999 the association was reorganized and all the underlying sections got separated into an umbrella organization. Before the start of the 2017 season, Hammarby IF DFF was merged with Hammarby Fotboll.

Hammarby won the top tier Damallsvenskan in 1985 and two national cups in 1994 and 1995. In 1994 it was also the championship's runner-up. Previously, the team had been the cup's runner-up in its first three editions (1981–83). The home ground of the women's team is Hammarby IP, although occasionally they have played competitive games at Zinkensdamms IP and Tele2 Arena.

=== Futsal ===
In May 2016, Hammarby announced that they would establish a men's senior futsal team. Playing their home games in Eriksdalshallen, Hammarby competed in the Swedish second tier, Division 1 Södra Svealand, during their inaugural season. In 2017, Hammarby won promotion to the Swedish Futsal League, the premier championship.

== Works cited ==
- Persson, Gunnar (1996). Hammarby IF: En klubbhistoria 1897–1997 (in Swedish). Strömbergs Bokförlag. ISBN 91-7151-097-4.
