= Oscar Steinke =

Swedish association football player

Personal information
- Full name: Oscar Magnus Steinke Brånby
- Date of birth: 7 February 2006 (age 20)
- Place of birth: Nacka, Sweden
- Position: Left-back

Team information
- Current team: Hammarby IF
- Number: 31

Youth career
- –2021: Boo FF
- 2022–2023: Hammarby IF

Senior career*
Years	Team	Apps	(Gls)
2024–	Hammarby TFF	58	(2)
2026–	Hammarby IF	16	(0)

International career^{‡}
2022	Sweden U16	1	(0)
2022	Sweden U17	1	(0)
2023	Sweden U19	2	(0)
- * Club domestic league appearances and goals as of 7 November 2026 ‡ National team caps and goals as of 6 April 2023

Oscar Magnus Steinke (Note: German pronunciation: [ˈʃtaɪŋkə].) Brånby (born 7 February 2006) is a Swedish professional footballer who plays as a left-back for Allsvenskan club Hammarby IF.

== Club career ==
After impressive performances for two consecutive years in Ettan, Steinke was promoted to the senior team of Hammarby ahead of the 2026 season. He rejected proposals from other Allsvenskan clubs in order to fight for a spot with Hammarby. On 4 April 2026, he made his Allsvenskan debut in a 3–0 win against reigning champions Mjällby AIF.

== Style of play ==
Despite primarily playing as a left-back, Steinke is known for his dribbling ability.
