= Midnattsloppet =

Midnight summer running race in Sweden

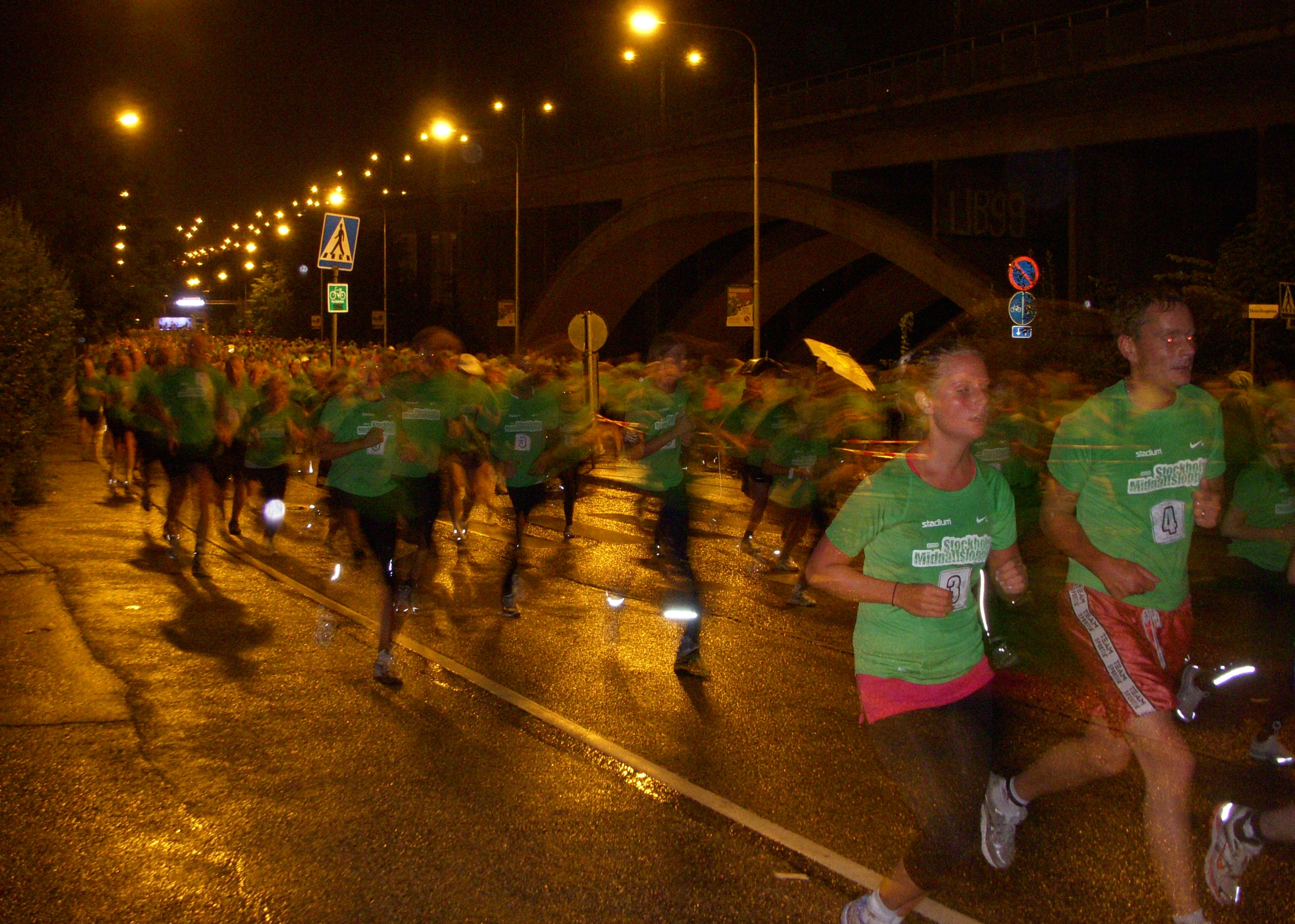
Midnattsloppet on 15 August 2009, at Skansbron in Stockholm.

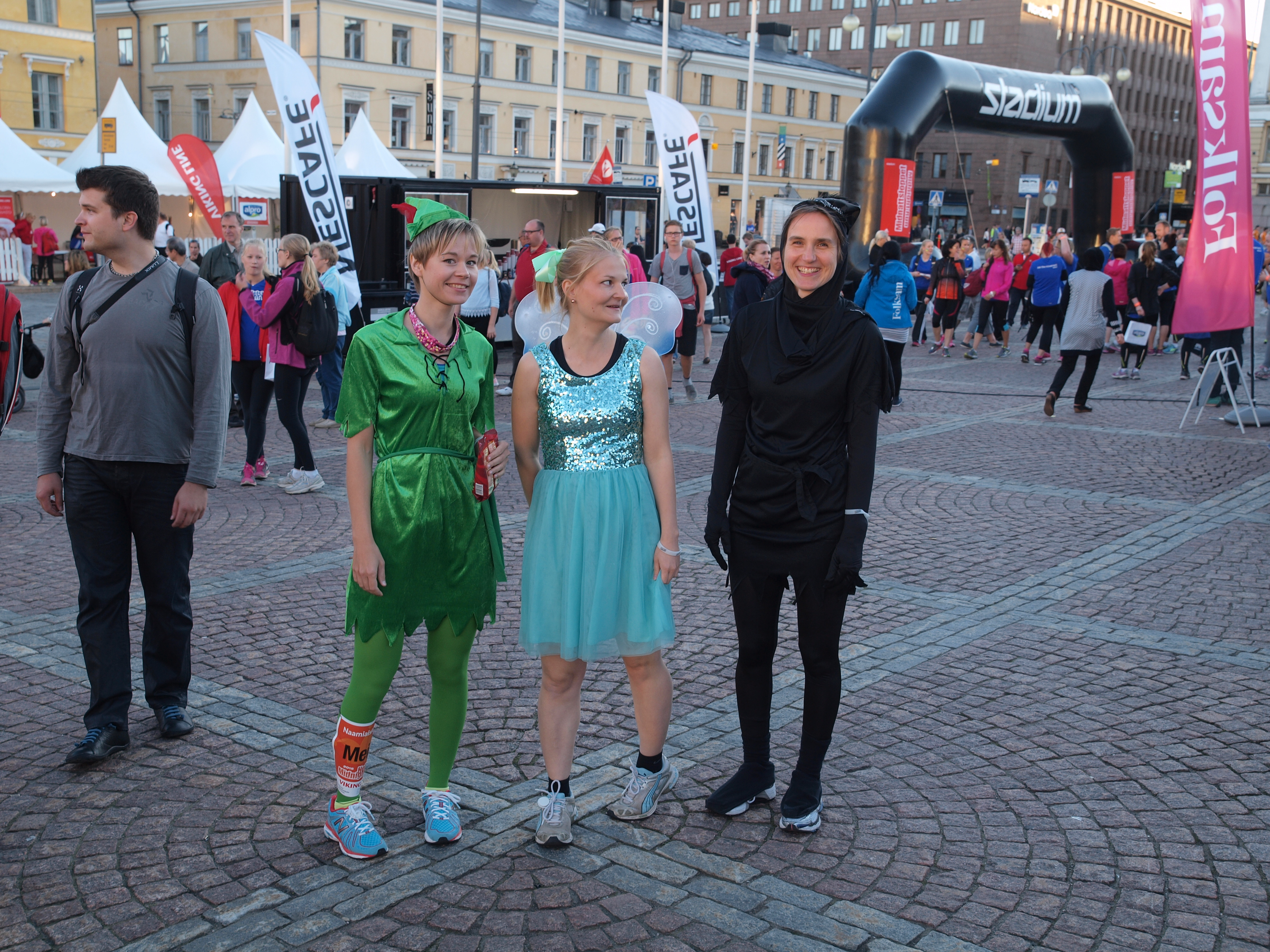
Although most of the participants run in plain clothes, running in fancy dress costumes is common at Midnattsloppet.

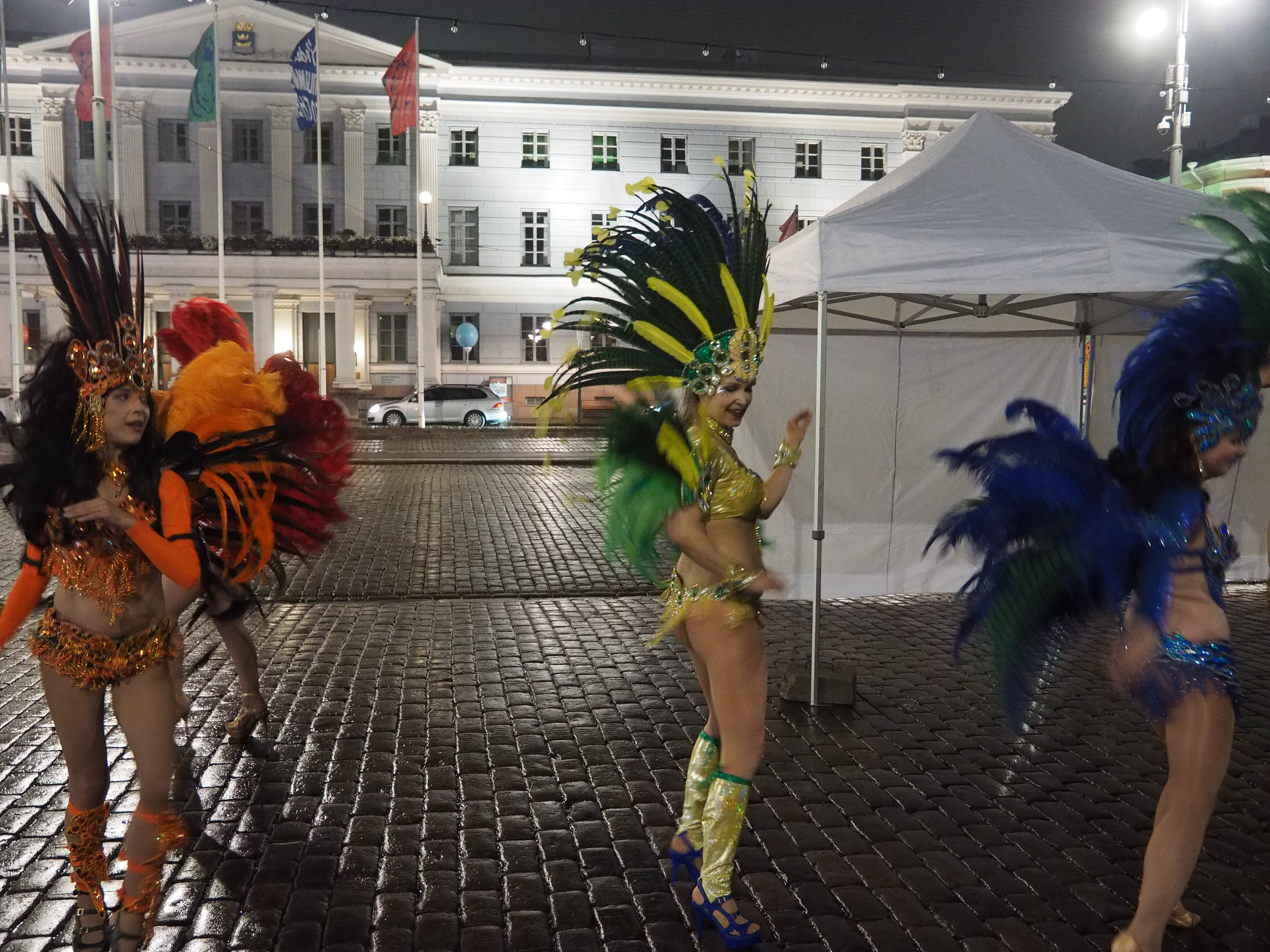
Samba dancers cheer the participants on during the run.

Midnattsloppet (Swedish for "The Midnight Run") is a running competition organised in Stockholm, Gothenburg and Malmö in Sweden, as well as Helsinki in Finland, by Midnattsloppet Nordic AB, a daughter company of Hammarby IF.

== Stockholm ==
The first Midnattsloppet run was held in Södermalm in Stockholm in 1982 and has been held annually since. The length of the run varied until 1995, when it was set at 10 kilometres. In recent years, the run has been controlled by officially licensed referees. The run is held on a Saturday in the beginning of August every year. Originally starting at 22:00, since 2011 the first group starts at 21:30. The number of participants varies between 15 thousand and 22 thousand, but the number of spectators is usually much greater.

For children and youths, the Lilla midnattsloppet ("little midnight run") is held at 20:00 on the same evening. It started as Middagsloppet ("mid-day run") in 1990, and has since been shifted to the evening.

The starting place for Midnattsloppet in Stockholm has been at Zinkensdamms IP and Ringvägen in the south since 1991, the goal is at Hornsgatan in the west near Rosenlundsgatan.

Since 2004, Midnattsloppet has been held on the same day as the swimming competition Riddarfjärdssimningen, as the Stockholm 2athlon.

In 2010, the run was held on an unusually warm and humid day. Two runners died during the run: A 26-year-old collapsed upon reaching the goal near Zinkendamms IP. A 50-year-old man got a heart attack in the steep hill to the Sofia Church. He died in the ambulance on the way to Södersjukhuset. Many other runners had to be hospitalised because of dehydration.

== Gothenburg ==
The Gothenburg Midnattsloppet was held for the first time in 2008. The start and the goal were at Södra vägen at the southwestern corner of Heden, and the track ran through the city's central districts. Approximately 7 thousand people participated in the 10 km run in the first year. The next year, the run started at Sten Sturegatan, but the goal was still at Heden. The run has been held annually since. Since 2011, the run has started from Slottsskogen and gone from there to Linnéstaden. In 2012 there were 10,535 participants, of which 48% were women.

== Copenhagen ==
Midnattsloppet was held in Copenhagen, Denmark, at Frederiksberg from 2009 to 2010. The run has not been held in Copenhagen since.

== Malmö ==
The first Midnattsloppet in Malmö was held in 2013. The course passes the central districts of the city.

== Helsinki ==
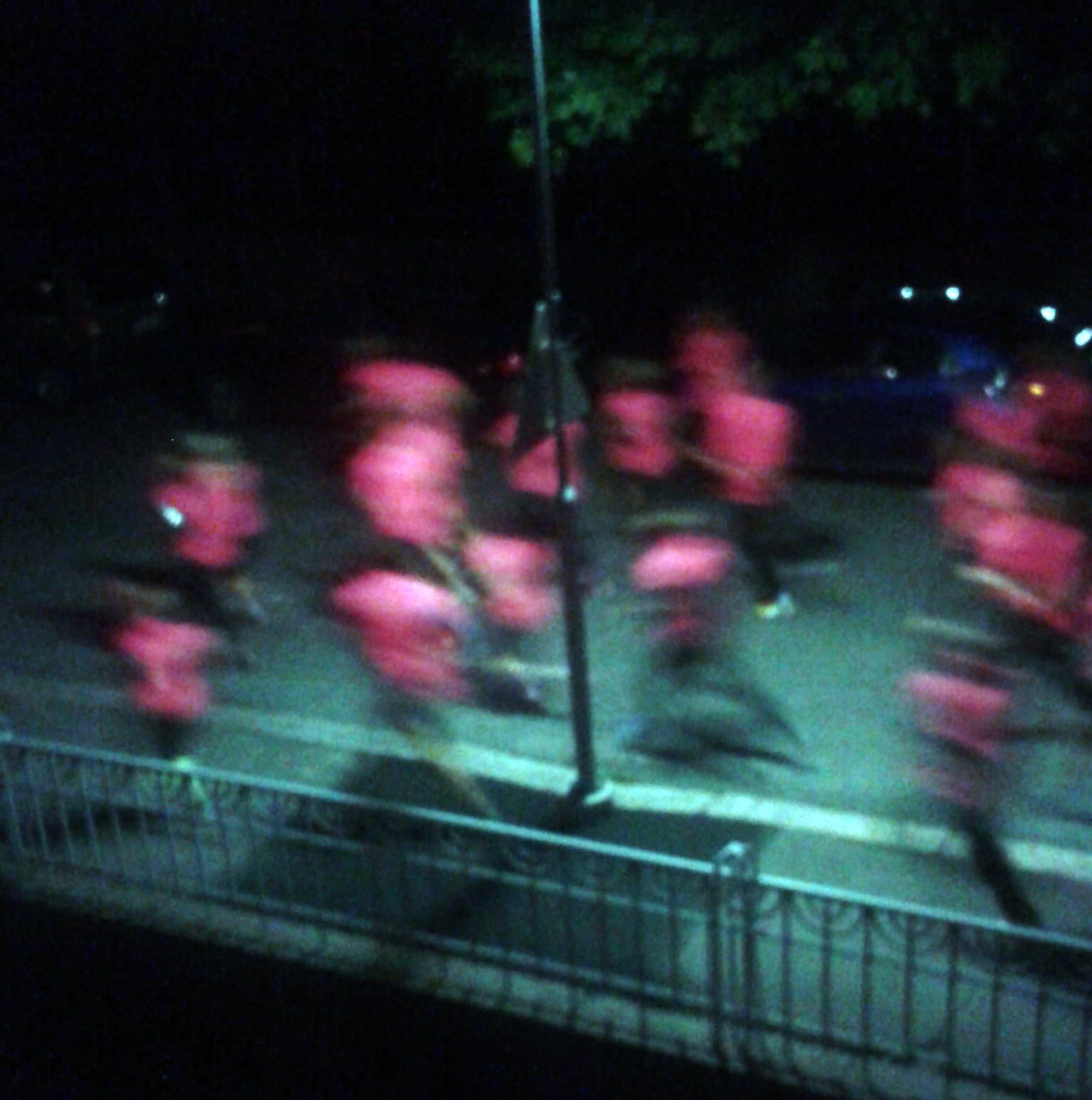
Midnight Run, Helsinki, 30 August 2014.

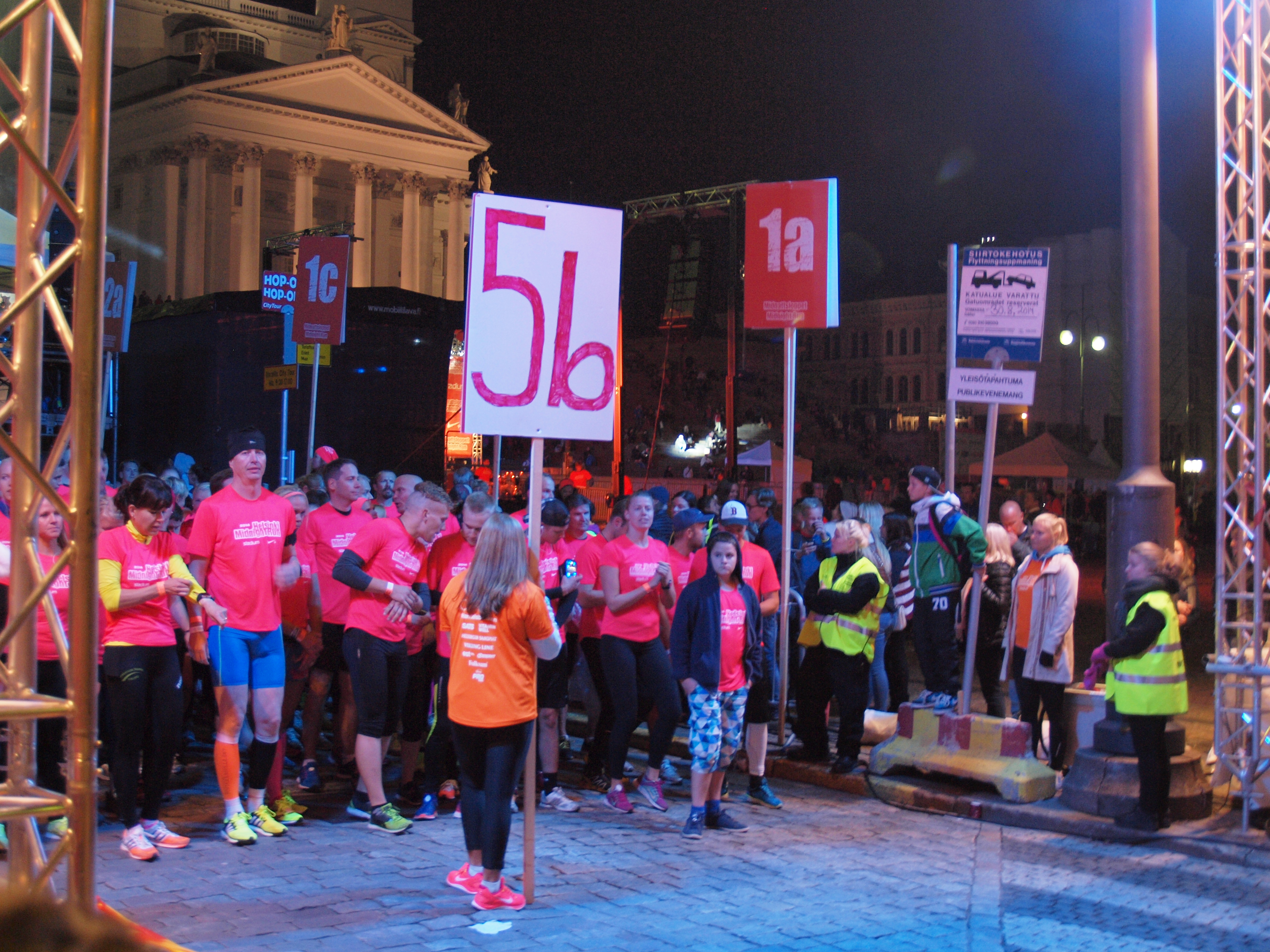
The start of Midnight Run in Helsinki in 2014.

The first Midnattsloppet run in Helsinki was held in 2010, with Helsinki becoming the fourth city to host the run, and Finland becoming the third country to do so. The run has been held annually since and the latest race was held on 1 September 2018. Both the start and the goal of the run are at the Helsinki Senate Square.

== Midnattsloppet Nordic AB ==
Since 2010, Midnattsloppet Nordic AB has organised the run in Sweden, Denmark and Finland. The company is a fully owned subsidiary of Hammarby IF. The company CEO is Göran Qvarfordt.
