= Axel Robert Schönthal =

Swedish engineer and founder of sports club Hammarby IF

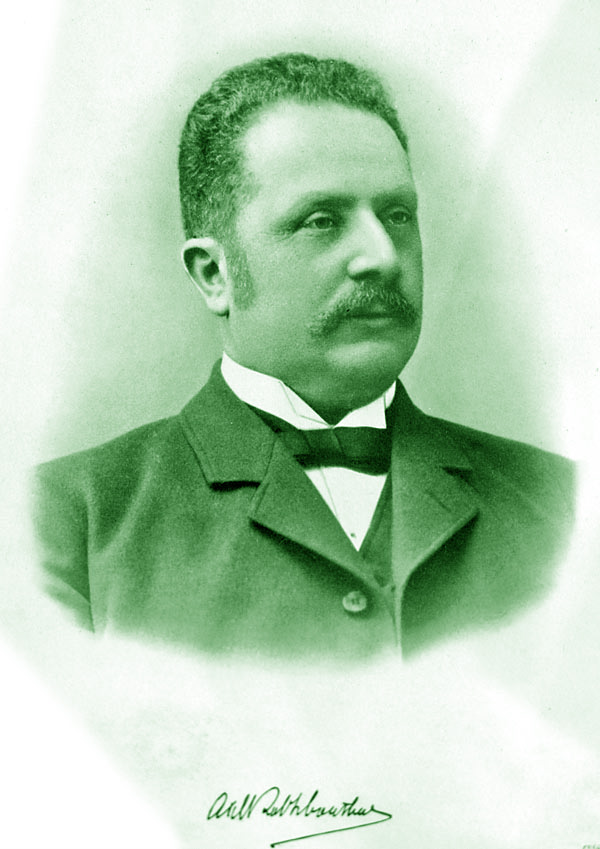
- Born: Axel Robert Schönthal; 12 June 1858; Norrköping, Sweden
- Died: 10 March 1929 (aged 70); Stockholm, Sweden
- Occupation: Engineer
- Employer: Stockholms Bomullsspinneri och Väfveri
- Known for: Founder of Hammarby IF

Axel Robert Schönthal (12 June 1858 – 10 March 1929) was a Swedish engineer, known for being the founder and first chairman of the sports club Hammarby IF in Stockholm.

== Biography ==
Axel Robert Schönthal was born in Norrköping to a Swedish-family, of Bavarian descent. His father was said to working in Norrköping, but non of this information is certain.

At age 20, he moved to Södermalm, a district in the Stockholm City Centre. He studied to become an engineer and found employment at Stockholms Bomullsspinneri- och Väfveri AB. Throughout his professional career, Schönthal worked as a supervisor at their cotton spinning mill Barnängen.

== Founding Hammarby IF ==
In 1884, Schönthal started to organise rowing competitions in Stockholm, which often drew attendances of some 1,000 people, allegedly drawing inspiration from the United Kingdom where he had lived for a couple of years in his teens.

On 10 April 1889, Schönthal founded Hammarby Roddförening ("Hammarby Rowing Association") in Stockholm together with five other members, and was the inaugural chairman of the club. Originally, it solely competed against other local clubs, with the races usually taking place on the watercourse Hammarby Sjö, which the club took its name from.

The club's crest consisted of a white flag with three green horizontal lines. They drew inspiration from two other competing rowing clubs in Stockholm that used two blue respectively two red lines on a white flag, but chose the colour green since it represented hope. The club eventually added a third stripe when it discovered that Göteborgs RF used a similar green-white flag with two stripes.

The members exclusively consisted of young men from the working class, employed as industrial workers at one of the many factories in the Södermalm district. In 1891, Schönthal left the chairman position and instead got voted as an honorary member of Hammarby RF.

By 1897, the club had diversified into different sports following demands from its members, with the first other being athletics, and it was renamed Hammarby Idrottsförening ("Hammarby Sports Club"), or Hammarby IF for short. The new multi-sport club was officially established on 7 March said year, with Carl Julius Sundholm taking the inaugural chairman position.

== Works cited ==
- Persson, Gunnar (1996). Hammarby IF: En klubbhistoria 1897–1997 (in Swedish). Strömbergs Bokförlag. ISBN 91-7151-097-4.
