= Surf Route 101 =

Studio album by The Super Stocks
- Released: 1964

The Super Stocks chronology
School Is a Drag (1964)	Surf Route 101 (1964)	Thunder Road (1964)

Surf Route 101 is a 1964 album by the Super Stocks, one of Gary Usher's ad-hoc surf and hot-rod studio groups. The band's line up featured some of the best surf musicians of the period including Glen Campbell. The title track "Surf Route 101" was a cover of a song from Jan and Dean's 1963 album Drag City. Brian Wilson had collaborated with Usher on "My First Love" and "Muscle Beach Party" for the 1964 film Muscle Beach Party, where they were originally performed by Dick Dale and his Del-Tones. For the Super Stocks album Usher re-used the original backing tracks made for the film.

== Track listing ==
1. "Surf Route 101"
2. "Muscle Beach Party"
3. "Ventura"
4. "Santa Barbara"
5. "Redondo Beach"
6. "Surfin' Scene"
7. "Balboa Island"
8. "Oceanside"
9. "My First Love"
10. "Midnight Run"
11. "Malibu Blues"
12. "Newport Beach"

The album came with a promotional single for another studio band, Mr. Gasser & The Weirdos with "Doin' the Surfink", B-side "Finksville, USA". Likewise that group's album contained a promo single for "Midnight Run" from the Super Stocks' album.
