= Hammarby IF =

Sports club in Stockholm, Sweden

- Full name: Hammarby Idrottsförening
- Nickname: Bajen
- Founded: 10 April 1889; 136 years ago (as Hammarby Roddförening); 7 March 1897; 128 years ago (as Hammarby Idrottsförening)
- Based in: Stockholm, Sweden
- Colors: Green and white
- Chairman: Henrik Appelqvist
- Website: www.hammarby-if.se

Hammarby Idrottsförening ("Hammarby Sports Club"), commonly known as Hammarby IF or simply Hammarby (Swedish pronunciation: [ˈhâmːarˌbyː] or, especially locally, [-ˌbʏ]), is a Swedish sports club located in Stockholm, with a number of member organizations active in a variety of different sports.

It was founded in 1889 as Hammarby Roddförening ("Hammarby Rowing Association"), but by 1897 the club had diversified and was participating in different sports, leading to the renaming to Hammarby IF.

In 1999, the club was reorganized into a legal format referred to in Swedish as an alliansförening ("alliance association"), with each of the club's departments becoming a separate legal entity cooperating under the "Hammarby IF" umbrella.

As of 2020, the club had a record high number of 22,746 active members in all of its sections.

== History ==
=== 1889–1914: Growth from small rowing association to multi-sport club ===
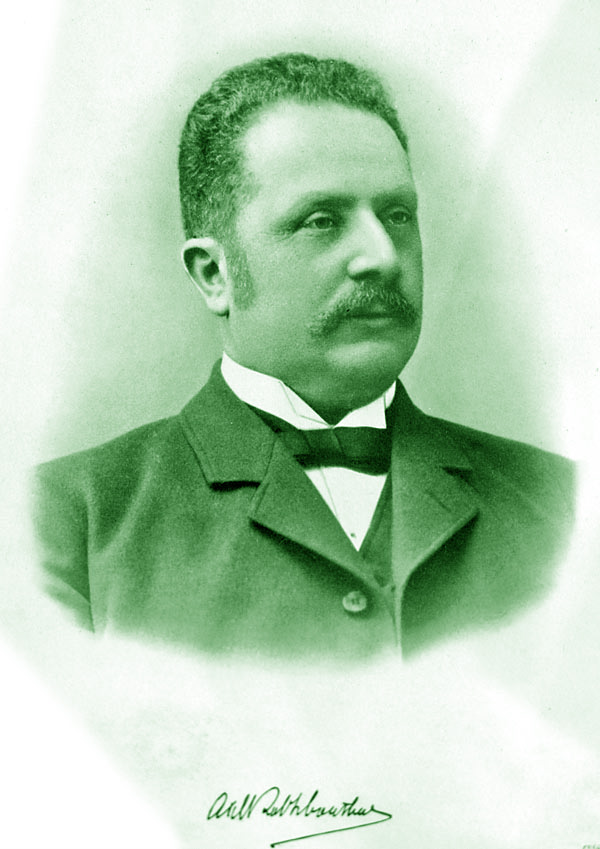
Axel Robert Schönthal is credited as the founding force of Hammarby Roddförening.

On 10 April 1889, Hammarby Roddförening ("Hammarby Rowing Association") was established in Södermalm, a district in the Stockholm City Centre, with engineer Axel Robert Schönthal, the first chairman, being credited as the founder. Originally, it solely competed against other local clubs in the sport of rowing, with the races usually taking place on the watercourse Hammarby Sjö, which the club took its name from. The members exclusively consisted of young men from the working class, employed as industrial workers at one of the many factories in the Södermalm district.

By 1897, the club had diversified into different sports following demands from its members, with the first other being athletics, and it was renamed Hammarby Idrottsförening ("Hammarby Sports Club"), or Hammarby IF for short. The new multi-sport club was officially established on 7 March said year, with Carl Julius Sundholm taking the inaugural chairman position.

The association launched its first team sport in 1905, the section Hammarby IF Bandy, thus becoming one of the first bandy clubs in Sweden. The first nationwide league was, however, not held until 1930, and the club has not dropped below either the highest or second highest division since.

=== 1915–1957: Birth of the football section and golden years in hockey ===
The sporting ground Hammarby IP (also known as "Kanalplan") was built in Södermalm in 1915, officially opened on 15 September by Gustaf VI Adolf, by then the Crown Prince of Sweden. Due to a lack of football pitches in Stockholm, several other local clubs proposed to merge with Hammarby IF to get access to the stadium. An offer from Klara SK was accepted and a football department was established the same year, Hammarby IF Fotboll. In 1918, Hammarby also merged with Johanneshofs IF, a club from the neighbouring district Johanneshov. The club ended as runners-up in the 1922 Svenska Mästerskapet, a cup by then held to decide the Swedish champions, losing 1–3 to GAIS in the final.

In 1919, Hammarby IF Boxning was founded, who formed the Swedish Boxing Association together with nine other clubs. Gunnar Berggren finished third in the lightweight class at the 1928 Olympics in Amsterdam, making him the only Hammarby athlete that has ever won an Olympic medal in an individual sport. By 1930, the boxing department found themselves in financial difficulties, after arranging a loss-making gala at Cirkus, and was dissolved.

The club started playing ice hockey in 1921, with their team being made up by a group of bandy players during the first matches. Hammarby IF Hockey would soon position itself as a giant in the early history of the sport in the country, playing in the top league from its inaugural season in 1922 until 1957. During that period, they were crowned domestic champions eight times (in 1932, 1933, 1936, 1937, 1942, 1943, 1945, and 1951).

Famous cyclist Sven Johansson joined Hammarby IF in 1937. Throughout his career, he won 11 individual Swedish Championship titles, and an additional 13 at club level.

In 1939, Hammarby IF Handboll was originally founded. The handball section would cease its operation in the 1950s, but was re-established in 1970 after a merger with local club Lundens BK.

=== 1958–1990: Nyman era ===
Lennart Nyman took over as chairman of Hammarby IF in 1965, a position he would hold for 25 years until 1990, as the longest-serving in its history. He was simultaneously the chairman of Hammarby's football section.

In 1970, Hammarby IF Damfotboll was established, making the club one of the pioneers in Swedish women's football, and it was crowned domestic champions in 1985. Until its first relegation from the top tier in 2011, the club was one of only two teams that had played all 24 seasons in Damallsvenskan since the competition's foundation in 1988.

The first Midnattsloppet run was held in Södermalm in Stockholm in 1982, and has since been hosted annually by Hammarby IF. The number of participants varies between 20,000 and 40,000, who run 10 kilometres in the night time, but the number of spectators is usually much greater.

=== 1990–: Success in bandy, football and handball ===
In 1999, the club was reorganized into a legal format referred to in Swedish as an alliansförening ("alliance association"), with each of the club's departments becoming a separate legal entity cooperating under the "Hammarby IF" umbrella.

The club won its first Swedish championship in football, the biggest domestic sport, in 2001. The gold medal was celebrated at Medborgarplatsen in front of some 20,000 supporters in the square. Hammarby won its first Swedish Cup title in 2021, they played the final versus BK Häcken at their home venue Tele2 Arena. The game was tied after full time and ended up in a penalty shootout, where Hammarby won 5-4.

Hammarby IF won three consecutive Swedish championships in handball from 2006 to 2008, breaking the dominance of clubs from southern and western Götaland that had won all domestic titles since 1978.

In 2010, Hammarby IF also won their first Swedish championship in bandy, after ending as runners-up in six seasons of the previous decade. They also won the gold medal in 2013, through a final that was played at Friends Arena in front of a record crowd of 38,474.

== Colours, badge and nickname ==
=== Colours ===
The club's colours are green and white, which is reflected in its crest and kit. When Hammarby Roddförening (Hammarby RF) was founded in 1889, the club's crest consisted of a white flag with three green horizontal lines. They drew inspiration from two other competing rowing clubs in Stockholm that used two blue respectively two red lines on a white flag, but chose the colour green since it represented hope. The club eventually added a third stripe when it discovered that Göteborgs RF used a similar green-white flag with two stripes.

=== Kit ===
In 1915, Hammarby IF determined their kit to consist of a white shirt with the abbreviation "HIF" on its chest, white shorts and black socks. Following the merger with Johanneshofs IF in 1918, Hammarby changed its team apparel to Johanneshof's black-and-yellow striped shirts, blue shorts and black socks with yellow stripes. The first section to use the new kit was the bandy team, with the football section adopting it not much later.

The club changed from blue pants to black in the 1960s. When the renowned footballer Lennart Skoglund rejoined Hammarby in 1964, he donated the club a set of black shorts because he thought the team's blue shorts looked awful.

In 1978, 60 years after the merger with Johanneshof, Hammarby changed its home colours from black and yellow to white shirts, green shorts and white socks.

=== Nickname ===
When Hammarby's ice hockey team was on tour in the United Kingdom in 1946, player Stig Emanuel Andersson allegedly coined the term "Bajen", a short form of a mock-English pronunciation of "Hammarby", that has been the club's most used nickname since the 1970s.

== Supporters ==
Hammarby has historically been regarded as a club with a mainly working-class fan base, due to its connection with the formerly working-class (but today gentrified) Södermalm district of Stockholm. Nowadays the club attracts fans from all parts of society. According to a 2016 poll, a large part of the club's fan base tends to support left-wing politics compared to those of their local rivals AIK and Djurgården. The club has strong ties to Söderort, the southern part of the Stockholm urban area. According to a survey made by Novus, Hammarby Football is the most popular football club in Stockholm. Between 2013 and 2016 Hammarby Football had the highest average attendance in Scandinavia. In 2015 Hammarby Football managed to break a Swedish record in regards to attendance, the support amounted to a season average of 25,507. The season 2022 Hammarby broke their own record with 26,372 average attendance.

== Honours ==
As of 2020, Hammarby has won 271 domestic championship gold medals, 306 silver medals and 294 bronze medals in 16 different sports.

== Member clubs ==
Sport	Club name	Founded	Joined HIF	Home venue
Arm wrestling	Hammarby IF Armbrytarförening	2014	2014	
Athletics	Hammarby IF Friidrottsförening	1897	1897	
Bandy	Hammarby IF Bandy	1905	1905	Zinkensdamms IP
Basketball	Hammarby IF Basket	1975	2015	Farstahallen
Boule	Hammarby IF Bouleförening	2002	2002	
Bowling	Hammarby IF Bowlingförening	1938	1938	Brännkyrka Bowlingcenter
Boxing	Hammarby IF Boxningsförening	1919	1969	
Floorball	Hammarby IF Innebandy	1993	1993	Sjöstadshallen
Football	Hammarby IF Fotbollförening (men); Hammarby IF Fotbollförening (women)	1915; 1970	1915; 1970	Tele2 Arena; Hammarby IP
Futsal	Hammarby IF Futsal	2016	2016	Eriksdalshallen
Goalball	Hammarby IF Goalbollförening	2000	2000	
Golf	Hammarby Golfklubb	2019	2020	Björkhagens GK
Handball	Hammarby IF Handboll	1939	1939	Eriksdalshallen
Ice hockey	Hammarby IF Ishockeyförening	2008	2013	SDC-hallen
Orienteering	Hammarby IF Orienteringsförening	1922	1922	
Rowing	Hammarby IF Roddförening	1889	1889	
Rugby union	Hammarby IF Rugby	2000	2000	
Speedway	Hammarby Speedway	2003	2003	
Skiing	Hammarby IF Skidförening	1937	1937	
Table tennis	Hammarby IF Bordtennisförening	1948	2010	

=== Defunct member clubs ===
- Hammarby Hockey (1921–2008)

== Works cited ==
- Persson, Gunnar (1996). Hammarby IF: En klubbhistoria 1897–1997 (in Swedish). Strömbergs Bokförlag. ISBN 91-7151-097-4.
