= Folke Adamsson =

Swedish footballer and manager

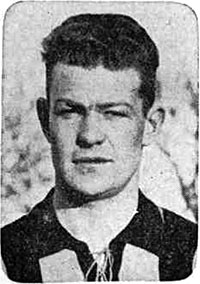
- Adamsson with Hammarby IF in 1938

Personal information
- Date of birth: 1911
- Place of birth: Fagersta, Sweden
- Date of death: 1977 (aged 66)
- Place of death: Stockholm, Sweden
- Position: Midfielder

Youth career
- –1930: Fagersta AIK

Senior career*
Years	Team	Apps	(Gls)
1931–1943	Hammarby IF	187	(46)

Managerial career
- 1947–1965: Hammarby IF
- * Club domestic league appearances and goals

Folke Adamsson (1911–1977) was a Swedish football player and manager. He represented Hammarby IF during his whole playing career and later went on to coach the club for 18 years, as the longest-serving manager in its history.

== Club career ==
He grew up in Fagersta and started to play youth football with local club Fagersta AIK. In 1931, at age 19, Adamsson moved to Hammarby IF in Stockholm.

Between 1931 and 1943, Adamsson made 187 league appearances for Hammarby, mostly in the Swedish second tier. In 1940, Hammarby played one season in Allsvenskan, the domestic top league, but was relegated immediately.

In 1943, Adamsson retired from playing due to a persistent knee injury.

== Managerial career ==
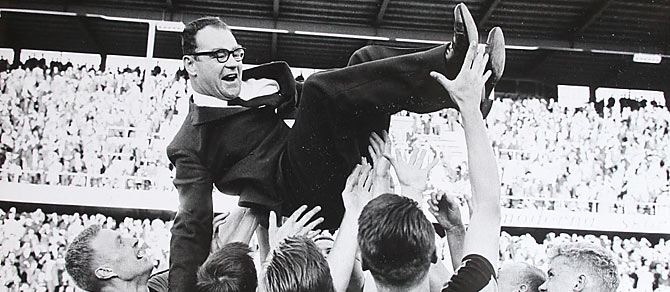
Folke Adamsson being celebrated by his players as Hammarby secured their top-flight status in 1961.

After his playing career, Adamsson was the coach of Huvudsta IS and Hagalunds IS.

In 1946–47, Hammarby finished last in Division 2, and got relegated to Division 4 due to a restructuring of the Swedish league system. The next season, Adamsson took over as head coach of Hammarby, replacing Sven Bergqvist. The economy had collapsed and the club's entire existence was now threatened. Up on his return to Hammarby, Adamsson said:

I had been away for a while and knew the club was in a downward spiral: no players, no coaches, no finances, everything seemed to be falling apart. However, some people had persevered, and I decided to do my bit. I simply did not want to see my dear old Hammarby become a new Westermalm.

Adamsson would, together with team manager Lennart Nyman, lead Hammarby IF from Division 4 back to Allsvenskan in just six seasons. The duo is credited with implementing a sense of work ethic and professionalism in the club. In the 1953–1954 season, the second tier was won without a single loss, whilst using only 15 players.

Hammarby went on to compete in Allsvenskan during the majority of Adamsson's stint at the club, before he decided to step down as manager at the end of 1965, being replaced by Georg Kraemer.

== Other sports ==
In 1939, Adamsson was part of the first squad as Hammarby established a handball section.

== Works cited ==
- Persson, Gunnar (1996). Hammarby IF: En klubbhistoria 1897–1997 (in Swedish). Strömbergs Bokförlag. ISBN 91-7151-097-4.
