= Alberta Sports Hall of Fame =

- Established: 1957
- Location: Red Deer, Alberta, Canada
- Type: Sports Hall of Fame
- Website: www.albertasportshall.ca

The Alberta Sports Hall of Fame is a hall of fame and museum in Red Deer, Alberta, Canada, dedicated to the preservation and history of sports within the province. It was created in 1957 by the Alberta Amateur Athletic Union (AAAU). The museum was eventually taken over by Sport Alberta in 1973 when the AAAU ceased operations. It has been maintained by the Alberta Sports Hall of Fame and Museum Society since 1997. The first permanent display for the Hall of Fame was established in Edmonton in 1962. The museum relocated between Edmonton and Calgary on numerous occasions until settling in Red Deer in 1999.

== Induction ==
Induction was originally limited to amateur athletes. In 1979, eligibility was also extended to professional athletes. In the Hall's early years, winners of major international competitions were automatic qualifiers for entry. However, that practice was ended by 1981 as part of a general tightening of induction criteria for such halls of fame across Canada. At that time, the maximum number of inductions was limited to seven athletes or teams per year. Inductees are divided into several categories such as athletes, teams, builders, and pioneers. The provincial sports media members were also given the Bell Memorial Award

The first inductees, in 1958, were boxers Charles Cheesman, Wilf Greaves and Hugh Sloan, and track athlete George Sutherland.

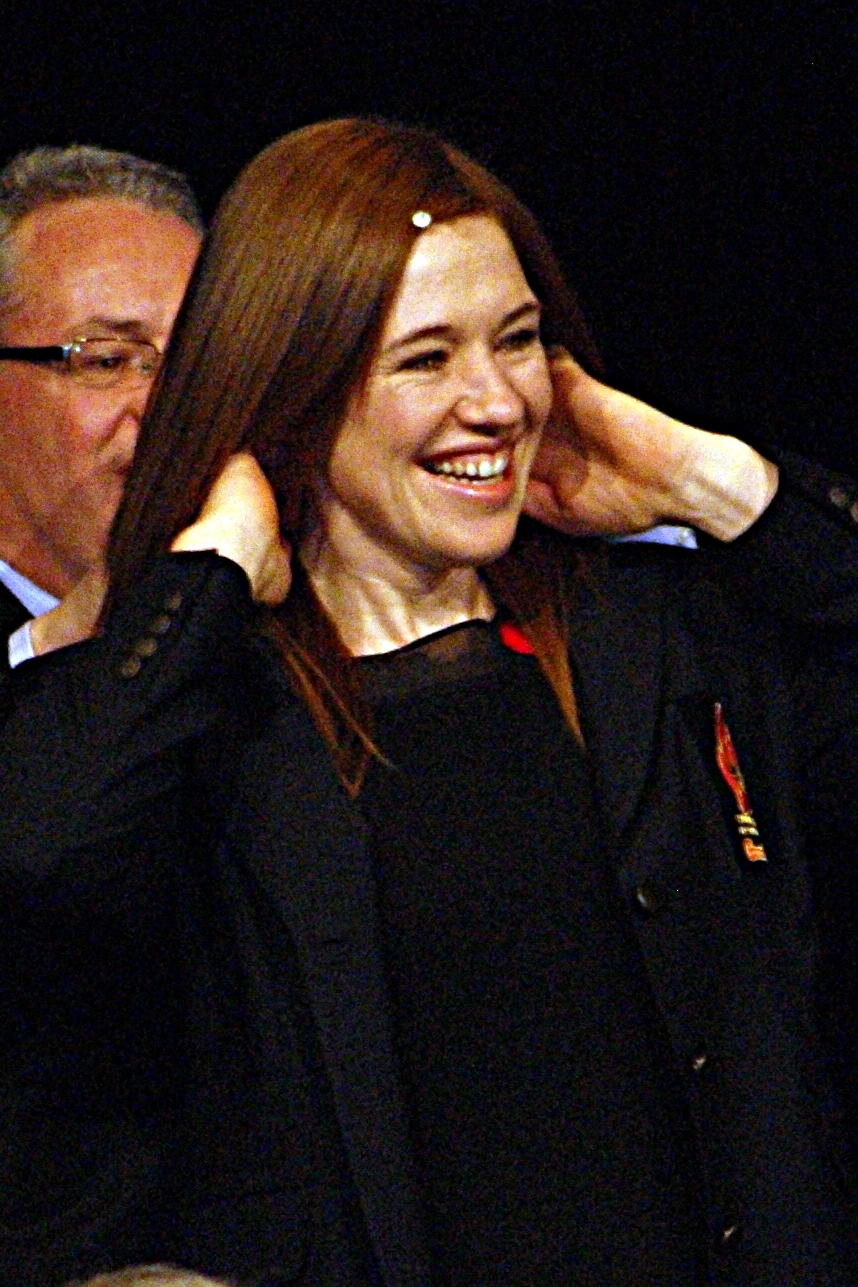
Clara Hughes being inducted into Hall of Fame

== Notable inductees ==
=== Individual persons ===
Year	Inductee	Description
2018	Keely Brown	Canadian born ringette goalie and coach for the Canada national ringette team, goalie for the Canada women's national inline hockey team, ice hockey goalie, and a Ringette Canada Hall of Fame inductee
2007	Don Barry	Canadian football player for the Edmonton Eskimos, three-time Grey Cup champion
2013	Earl W. Bascom	American-Canadian cowboy, rodeo performer, and actor known as the "Father of Modern Rodeo"
1980	Johnny Bright	Canadian Football League player and member of several football halls of fame
1980	Michelle Calkins	Synchronized swimmer and gold medalist at the 1978 World Aquatics Championships
2000	Ed Chynoweth	President of the Canadian Hockey League and Western Hockey League
1998	Peter Connellan	University of Calgary Dinos football coach, Canadian Football Hall of Fame inductee
2005	Andy Clovechok	Canadian ice hockey player for the Vancouver Canucks and Edmonton Flyers, others, inducted into at least five halls of fame
1983	Margaret Crosland	Two-time winner of the Canadian Figure Skating Championships
2008	Melody Davidson	Head coach of Olympic gold medal-winning Canada women's national ice hockey team
1995	Willie deWit	Canadian former Olympic boxer who now is a Justice of the Court of Queen's Bench of Alberta sitting in Calgary
1980	John Ducey	Baseball executive and umpire, owner of the Edmonton Eskimos
2005	Red Dutton	Professional ice hockey player and coach, President of the National Hockey League
2000	Robert Easton	Canadian Paralympic wheelchair racer, and member of three halls of fame in Canada
1995	Dave Fennell	Voted Canadian Football League Top 50 player of the modern era by The Sports Network
1986	Bill Gadsby	Professional ice hockey player, Hockey Hall of Fame inductee
2004	Bryan Hall	Radio broadcaster for the Edmonton Eskimos
1988	Sharon Hambrook	Synchronized swimmer and gold medalist at the 1982 World Aquatics Championships
1989	W. G. Hardy	President of the International Ice Hockey Federation and Member of the Order of Canada
1980	Stu Hart	Professional wrestler, mult-sport athlete, patriarch of the Hart wrestling family
2002	Terry Jones	Journalist, Elmer Ferguson Memorial Award recipient, Canadian Football Hall of Fame, Canadian Curling Hall of Fame
2008	Yoshio Katsuta	Japanese-Canadian judoka and first president of the Alberta Black Belt Association
1990	Reg Kesler	Although he competed in 5 rodeo events, he was best known as a rodeo stock contractor
1983	Ray Kingsmith	Canadian curler and politician who was inducted into the Canadian Curling Hall of Fame in 1986 and 1994
1980	Pete Knight	Canadian and World Champion rodeo bronc rider
2013	Ray Knight	Knight created the Raymond Stampede, oldest rodeo in Canada; known as the first stock contractor
2009	Jennifer Krempien	Canada women's national wheelchair basketball team player and Paralympic gold medalist
1990	Joe Kryczka	President of the Canadian Amateur Hockey Association
1980	Kelly Kryczka	Synchronized swimmer and gold medalist at the 1979 Pan American Games and the 1982 World Aquatics Championships
2008	Lawrence Lemieux	Sailor recognized for his "sportsmanship, self-sacrifice and courage" during the 1988 Summer Olympics
2015	Bruce MacGregor	Retired National Hockey League and World Hockey Association player, and assistant general manager of the Edmonton Oilers
1996	Ron MacLean	Canadian sportscaster for CBC Television and Rogers Media, host of Hockey Night in Canada
1993	Lanny McDonald	Professional ice hockey player, Hockey Hall of Fame inductee
2015	Joey Moss	Long-time locker room attendant with Down syndrome for the Edmonton Oilers and Edmonton Eskimos due to Wayne Gretsky's influence.
1970	Howard Palmer	1941 Macdonald Brier champion curler
1968	Art Potter	President of the Canadian Amateur Hockey Association and the Alberta Amateur Hockey Association
1980	Billy Rose	Canadian curler, skip of The Brier champion team in 1946 representing Alberta
2014	Phyllis Sadoway	Canadian born coach for the Canada national ringette team and the United States national ringette team, also a Ringette Canada Hall of Fame inductee
2007	Byron Seaman	One of the original six owners of the Calgary Flames
1988	John Short	Edmonton-based sports journalist and broadcaster
1980	Betty Stanhope-Cole	Canadian Golf Hall of Fame inductee
1984	Robert Steadward	President of the Canadian Paralympic Committee and International Olympic Committee
1958	George Sutherland	Athlete at the British Empire Games in track and field events
2008	Karl Tilleman	Canadian two-time Olympian basketball player and attorney
1987	Phil Tollestrup	Canadian basketball player who played in the Olympics and is a member of several halls of fame
1980	Helen Vanderburg	Gold medalist in synchronised swimming at the FINA World Aquatics Championships
2010	Mike Vernon	Professional ice hockey goaltender
1959	Doug Kyle	Canadian Track and Field Athlete, Represented Canada in the 1956 & 1960 Olympic Games, 1954 British Empire Games and the 1959 & 1963 Pan American Games. Founder of the Calgary Marathon & CALTAF. UBC Sports Hall Of Fame inductee
1994	Marty Wood	Three-time World Champion saddle bronc rider, inducted into five halls of fame
2004	George Woolf	Canadian Thoroughbred racing jockey. He was inducted into the National Museum of Racing and Hall of Fame, Canada's Sports Hall of Fame and the Canadian Horse Racing Hall of Fame. The George Woolf Memorial Jockey Award is a prestigious annual award given by the United States Jockeys' Guild.

=== Groups and teams ===
Year	Group name	Description
2011	1950 Edmonton Mercurys	Gold medalists at the 1950 Ice Hockey World Championships. Team members: Jimmy Graham (coach), Harry Allen, Marsh Darling, Bob David, John Davies, Billie Dawe, Wilbert Delainey, Donald Gauf, Jimmy Kilburn, Leo Lucchini, Jack Manson, Doug MacAuley, Ab Newsome, Allan Purvis, Don Stanley, Bob Watt, Pete Wright, Hassie Young
1974	1951 Lethbridge Maple Leafs	Gold medalists at the 1951 Ice Hockey World Championships. Team members: Dick Gray (coach), Ken Branch, Bill Chandler, Dinny Flanagan, Bill Flick, Mallie Hughes, Bert Knibbs, Jim Malacko, Robert McGregor, Don McLean, Nap Milroy, Hector Negrello, Stan Obodiac, Walter Rimstad, Mickey Roth, Lou Siray, Carl Sorokoski, Jack Sumner, Don Vogan, Tom Wood
1968	1952 Edmonton Mercurys	Gold medalists in ice hockey at the 1952 Winter Olympics. Team members: Louis Holmes (coach), George Abel, John Davies, Billie Dawe, Robert Dickson, Donald Gauf, William Gibson, Ralph Hansch, Robert Meyers, David Miller, Eric Paterson, Thomas Pollock, Allan Purvis, Gordon Robertson, Louis Secco, Francis Sullivan, Bob Watt
1994	1990 and 1992 Canada West teams (Canada national ringette team)	Champions of the 1990 World Ringette Championships and the 1992 World Ringette Championships (also inducted into the Ringette Canada Hall of Fame). Team members: Tamara Anderson, Cindy Annala, Cara Brown, Lisa Brown, George Buzak (AC), Nicole Chapdelaine, Shauna Chomik, Jenny Cook, Susan Curran, Judy Diduck, Sandy Fenton, Shauna Flath, Anne Gillespie, Cheryl Govenlock (C), Stacey Hannay, Heather Hansen, Tami Ironside
2011	1963 Edmonton Oil Kings	Champions of the 1963 Memorial Cup. Team members: Russ Brayshaw (coach), Ron Anderson, Butch Barber, Tom Bend, Roger Bourbonnais, Jim Brown, Rich Bulloch, Jim Chase, Vince Downey, Jim Eagle, Ron Falkenberg, Harold Fleming, Doug Fox, Russ Kirk, S. Knox, Bert Marshall, Max Mestinsek, Butch Paul, Gregg Pilling, Pat Quinn, Dave Rochefort, Glen Sather, Reg Tashuk
2011	1966 Edmonton Oil Kings	Champions of the 1966 Memorial Cup. Team members: Ray Kinasewich (coach), Ron Anderson, Garnet Bailey, Doug Barrie, Brian Bennett, Ron Caley, Craig Cameron, Bob Falkenberg, Brian Hague, Al Hamilton, Jim Harrison, Galen Head, Ted Hodgsen, Kerry Ketter, Jim Knox, Ross Lonsberry, Don McLeod, Jim Mitchell, Harold Myers, Eugene Peacosh, Ross Perkins, Murray Pierce, Dave Rochefort, Ted Rogers, Jim Schraefel, Red Simpson, Ron Walters
