= Walter Rimstad =

Canadian ice hockey player

Whitey Rimstad
- Born: September 18, 1916 Edmonton, Alberta, Canada
- Died: August 15, 1996 (aged 79) Lethbridge, Alberta, Canada
- Height: 5 ft 10 in (178 cm)
- Weight: 165 lb (75 kg; 11 st 11 lb)
- Position: Center
- Shot: Left
- Played for: Lethbridge Maple Leafs; Edmonton Mercurys; New York Rovers
- National team: Canada
- Playing career: 1933–1951
Medal record
Men's ice hockey
Gold medal – first place	1951 Paris	Ice hockey

Walter S. "Whitey" Rimstad (September 18, 1916 – August 15, 1996) was a Canadian ice hockey player with the Lethbridge Maple Leafs. He won a gold medal at the 1950 World Ice Hockey Championships in Paris, France. The 1951 Lethbridge Maple Leafs team was inducted to the Alberta Sports Hall of Fame in 1974. He also played with the Edmonton Mercurys and New York Rovers.
