= Don Stanley =

Don Stanley may refer to:

- Don Stanley (announcer) (1917–2003), American radio and television announcer
- Don Stanley (footballer) (1945–2018), Australian rules footballer
- Don Stanley (ice hockey) (1917–2001), Canadian ice hockey player
