= Jack Manson =

Canadian ice hockey player (born 1926)

- Born: March 17, 1926 (age 100) Edmonton, Alberta, Canada
- Position: Goaltender
- Played for: Edmonton Mercurys
- National team: Canada
- Playing career: 1946–1950
Medal record
Men's ice hockey
Gold medal – first place	1950 London	Ice hockey

John Manson (born March 17, 1926) is a Canadian former ice hockey player with the Edmonton Mercurys. As a member of the Mercurys, he won the gold medal at the 1950 World Ice Hockey Championships in London, England. The 1950 Edmonton Mercurys was inducted to the Alberta Sports Hall of Fame in 2011. Manson also played with the Lethbridge Maple Leafs and Edmonton Flyers.

Manson later worked as a bricklayer and as a sales manager for a paper products company. In 2003, he was residing near Pigeon Lake, Alberta and was writing a book on the history of the area.
