= Mallie Hughes =

Canadian ice hockey player

- Born: October 13, 1921 Winnipeg, Manitoba, Canada
- Died: March 18, 1995 (aged 73) Lethbridge, Alberta, Canada
- Position: Goaltender
- Played for: Lethbridge Maple Leafs
- National team: Canada
- Playing career: 1939–1954
Medal record
Men's ice hockey
Gold medal – first place	1951 Paris	Ice hockey

Maldwyn D. Hughes (October 13, 1921 – March 18, 1995) was a Canadian ice hockey player with the Lethbridge Maple Leafs. He won a gold medal at the 1951 World Ice Hockey Championships in Paris, France. The 1951 Lethbridge Maple Leafs team was inducted to the Alberta Sports Hall of Fame in 1974.
