= Mickey Roth =

Canadian ice hockey player (1927–2025)

- Born: May 24, 1927 Cassel, Ontario, Canada
- Died: January 9, 2025 (aged 97) Ottawa, Ontario, Canada
- Height: 5 ft 10 in (178 cm)
- Weight: 165 lb (75 kg; 11 st 11 lb)
- Position: Centre
- Shot: Left
- Played for: Lethbridge Maple Leafs; Stratford Kroehlers; Stratford Indians
- National team: Canada
- Playing career: 1944–1962
Medal record
Men's ice hockey
Gold medal – first place	1951 Paris	Ice hockey

Lyle Arnold "Mickey" Roth (May 24, 1927 – January 9, 2025) was a Canadian ice hockey player with the Lethbridge Maple Leafs, winning a gold medal with them at the 1951 World Ice Hockey Championships in Paris. The 1951 Lethbridge Maple Leafs team was inducted to the Alberta Sports Hall of Fame in 1974. He also played with the Stratford Kroehlers and Stratford Indians.

Roth died in Ottawa, Ontario, on January 9, 2025, at the age of 97.
