= Carl Sorokoski =

Canadian ice hockey player

- Born: March 17, 1921 Red Deer, Alberta, Canada
- Died: June 7, 1977 (aged 56) Calgary, Alberta, Canada
- Position: Goaltender
- Played for: Lethbridge Maple Leafs
- National team: Canada
- Playing career: 1941–1954
Medal record
Men's ice hockey
Gold medal – first place	1951 Paris	Ice hockey

"King" Carl Sorokoski (March 17, 1921 – June 7, 1977), was a Canadian ice hockey player with the Lethbridge Maple Leafs. He won a gold medal at the 1951 World Ice Hockey Championships in Paris, France. The 1951 Lethbridge Maple Leafs team was inducted to the Alberta Sports Hall of Fame in 1974.
