= Dick Gray (ice hockey) =

Canadian ice hockey player

- Born: March 14, 1920 Calgary, Alberta, Canada
- Died: January 3, 1990 (aged 69) Lethbridge, Alberta, Canada
- Height: 6 ft 1 in (185 cm)
- Weight: 180 lb (82 kg; 12 st 12 lb)
- Position: Defenseman
- Shot: Right
- Played for: Lethbridge Maple Leafs
- National team: Canada
- Playing career: 1938–1951
Medal record
Men's ice hockey
Gold medal – first place	1951 Paris	Ice hockey

Richard Gray (March 14, 1920 – January 3, 1990) was a Canadian ice hockey player with the Lethbridge Maple Leafs. He won a gold medal at the 1951 World Ice Hockey Championships in Paris, France. The 1951 Lethbridge Maple Leafs team was inducted to the Alberta Sports Hall of Fame in 1974.
