= Bill Chandler (ice hockey) =

Canadian ice hockey player

- Born: August 5, 1930 Regina, Saskatchewan, Canada
- Died: March 7, 1991 (aged 60) Lethbridge, Alberta, Canada
- Height: 5 ft 6 in (168 cm)
- Weight: 140 lb (64 kg; 10 st 0 lb)
- Position: Left wing
- Shot: Left
- Played for: Lethbridge Maple Leafs; Lethbridge Native Sons
- National team: Canada
- Playing career: 1946–1951
Medal record
Men's ice hockey
| Gold medal – first place | 1951 Paris | Ice hockey |

William D. Chandler (August 5, 1930 – March 7, 1991) was a Canadian ice hockey player with the Lethbridge Maple Leafs. He won a gold medal at the 1951 World Ice Hockey Championships in Paris, France. The 1951 Lethbridge Maple Leafs team was inducted to the Alberta Sports Hall of Fame in 1974. He also played with the Lethbridge Native Sons.
