= Don McLean (ice hockey, born 1926) =

Canadian ice hockey player

- Born: October 6, 1926 Lethbridge, Alberta, Canada
- Died: August 23, 2009 (aged 82) Lethbridge, Alberta, Canada
- Position: Defence
- Played for: Lethbridge Maple Leafs
- National team: Canada
- Playing career: 1947–1959
Medal record
Men's ice hockey
| Gold medal – first place | 1951 Paris | Ice hockey |

Donald McLean (October 6, 1926 – August 23, 2009) was a Canadian ice hockey player with the Lethbridge Maple Leafs.

== Career ==
McLean won a gold medal at the 1951 World Ice Hockey Championships in Paris, France. The 1951 Lethbridge Maple Leafs team was inducted to the Alberta Sports Hall of Fame in 1974.
