= Bill Flick =

Canadian ice hockey player (1927–2018)

- Born: March 10, 1927 Guelph, Ontario, Canada
- Died: March 20, 2018 (aged 91) Ontario, Canada
- Position: Right Wing
- Shot: Right
- Played for: Lethbridge Maple Leafs; Stratford Kroehlers; Stratford Indians; Kitchener-Waterloo Dutchmen
- National team: Canada
- Playing career: 1943–1962
Medal record
Men's ice hockey
Gold medal – first place	1951 Paris	Ice hockey

William John Flick (March 10, 1927 – March 20, 2018), was a Canadian ice hockey player. He was born in Guelph, Ontario. In 1947 he made the Stratford Indians Senior Men's amateur hockey team. In the same year he was traded to the Kitchener Waterloo Dutchmen. It was with the Dutchmen that the infamous Flick, Roth and Flanagan line was assembled. In 1951 the Dutchmen finished the season early and the trio was picked up by the Lethbridge Maple Leafs to represent Canada in the World Ice Hockey Championships in Paris, France. The Lethbridge Leafs won the gold medal that year and the Flick, Roth and Flanagan line was the top scoring line of the tournament. The 1951 Lethbridge Maple Leafs team was inducted to the Alberta Sports Hall of Fame in 1974. In 2004 he was inducted into the Guelph Sports hall of Fame, Athlete Category He died in 2018 at the age of 91.
