= TDG =

TDG may refer to:

== Businesses ==
- TDG Limited, a UK logistics and distribution company
- Traffic Design Group, a New Zealand consultancy
- TransDigm Group, NYSE ticker symbol

== Law ==
- Transportation of Dangerous Goods Act, 1992, a Canadian law

== Science ==
- Thiodiglycol, an organosulfur compound
- Thymine-DNA glycosylase, an enzyme
- Transient directing group in organic chemistry

== Others ==
- Tandag Airport's IATA code
- Three Days Grace, Canadian rock band
