= Nap Milroy =

Canadian ice hockey player (1922–2012)

- Born: October 7, 1922 Lethbridge, Alberta, Canada
- Died: April 14, 2012 (aged 89) Lethbridge, Alberta, Canada
- Position: Center
- Played for: Lethbridge Maple Leafs
- National team: Canada
- Playing career: 1947–1959
Medal record
Men's ice hockey
Gold medal – first place	1951 Paris	Ice hockey

Andrew "Nap" Milroy (October 7, 1922 – April 14, 2012) was a Canadian ice hockey player with the Lethbridge Maple Leafs. He won a gold medal at the 1951 World Ice Hockey Championships in Paris, France. The 1951 Lethbridge Maple Leafs team was inducted to the Alberta Sports Hall of Fame in 1974.
