= Jim Malacko =

Canadian ice hockey player

- Born: May 27, 1930 Lethbridge, Alberta, Canada
- Died: December 25, 2016 (aged 86) Nelson, British Columbia, Canada
- Height: 5 ft 8 in (173 cm)
- Weight: 158 lb (72 kg; 11 st 4 lb)
- Position: Defenseman
- Played for: Lethbridge Maple Leafs; Nelson Maple Leafs
- National team: Canada
- Playing career: 1948–1965
Medal record
Men's ice hockey
Gold medal – first place	1951 Paris	Ice hockey

James I. Malacko (May 27, 1930 – December 25, 2016) was a Canadian ice hockey player with the Lethbridge Maple Leafs.

Known as "Shorty", he was on the team which won a gold medal at the 1951 World Ice Hockey Championships in Paris, France.

The defenceman from Lethbridge started playing with the Lethbridge Maple Leafs in 1950 in a season which culminated with his team representing Canada and winning the gold medal at the World Amateur Hockey Championships in Paris, France in 1951, and where years later this team was inducted into the Alberta Sports Hall of Fame in 1974.

The team was dominant throughout, winning all six of its games, outscoring its opponents by a 62-6 margin to win the gold medal.

The Maple Leafs went on that same year to win gold at the Sir Winston Churchill Cup Competition, in London, England.

During their European tour, the team played 62 games, winning 51.

Malacko stayed in Europe after that big win, playing with the Harringay Racers in England and moving to Germany a year later to help that nation with its Olympic program for the 1952 Winter Games in Oslo.

A year later, Malacko returned to Canada, married, and settled in Nelson, where he went on to play senior hockey for 12 years with the Nelson Maple Leafs, including 1964-1965 season when their team made it to the Allan Cup finals before losing to the champion Sherbrooke Beavers.

After retiring as a player, he became the general manager and coach for the team and still later he was very influential in minor hockey in Nelson.

Malacko died on Christmas Day 2016 in Nelson, British Columbia, aged 86.
