= Don Vogan =

Canadian ice hockey player

- Born: August 23, 1929 Regina, Saskatchewan, Canada
- Died: August 15, 2009 (aged 79) Edmonton, Alberta, Canada
- Height: 6 ft 0 in (183 cm)
- Weight: 175 lb (79 kg; 12 st 7 lb)
- Position: Defenseman
- Shot: Left
- Played for: Lethbridge Maple Leafs; Moose Jaw Canucks
- National team: Canada
- Playing career: 1946–1958
Medal record
Men's ice hockey
Gold medal – first place	1951 Paris	Ice hockey

Donald George Vogan (August 23, 1929 – August 15, 2009) was a Canadian ice hockey player with the Lethbridge Maple Leafs. He won a gold medal at the 1951 World Ice Hockey Championships in Paris, France. The 1951 Lethbridge Maple Leafs team was inducted to the Alberta Sports Hall of Fame in 1974. He also played with the Moose Jaw Canucks.
