= Dinny Flanagan =

Canadian ice hockey player

- Born: July 22, 1930 Kitchener, Ontario, Canada
- Died: November 25, 2018 (aged 88) Stratford, Ontario, Canada
- Position: Centre
- Shot: Left
- Played for: Lethbridge Maple Leafs; Stratford Kroehlers; Stratford Indians
- National team: Canada
- Playing career: 1946–1958
Medal record
Men's ice hockey
Gold medal – first place	1951 Paris	Ice hockey

Denis William Flanagan (July 22, 1930 – November 25, 2018) was a Canadian ice hockey player with the Lethbridge Maple Leafs. He won a gold medal at the 1951 World Ice Hockey Championships in Paris, France. The 1951 Lethbridge Maple Leafs team was inducted to the Alberta Sports Hall of Fame in 1974. He also played with the Stratford Kroehlers and Stratford Indians.
