= Tom Wood (ice hockey) =

Canadian ice hockey player

- Born: June 13, 1927 Fort Macleod, Alberta, Canada
- Died: March 15, 2015 (aged 87) Calgary, Alberta, Canada
- Height: 6 ft 0 in (183 cm)
- Weight: 170 lb (77 kg; 12 st 2 lb)
- Position: Right wing
- Shot: Right
- Played for: Lethbridge Maple Leafs
- National team: Canada
- Playing career: 1947–1951
Medal record
Men's ice hockey
Gold medal – first place	1951 Paris	Ice hockey

Thomas P. Wood (June 13, 1927 – March 15, 2015) was a Canadian ice hockey player with the Lethbridge Maple Leafs. He won a gold medal at the 1951 World Ice Hockey Championships in Paris, France. The 1951 Lethbridge Maple Leafs team was inducted to the Alberta Sports Hall of Fame in 1974.
