= Hector Negrello =

Canadian ice hockey player

- Born: March 10, 1921 Coalhurst, Alberta, Canada
- Died: June 9, 2000 (aged 79) Lethbridge, Alberta, Canada
- Position: Right wing
- Played for: Lethbridge Maple Leafs
- National team: Canada
- Playing career: 1939–1954
Medal record
Men's ice hockey
| Gold medal – first place | 1951 Paris | Ice hockey |

Hector Negrello (March 10, 1921 – June 9, 2000) was a Canadian ice hockey player with the Lethbridge Maple Leafs. He won a gold medal at the 1951 World Ice Hockey Championships in Paris, France. The 1951 Lethbridge Maple Leafs team was inducted to the Alberta Sports Hall of Fame in 1974.
