= Bert Knibbs =

Canadian ice hockey player

- Born: March 3, 1924 Grassy Lake, Alberta, Canada
- Died: July 31, 1998 (aged 74) Bow Island, Alberta, Canada
- Position: Right wing
- Played for: Lethbridge Maple Leafs
- National team: Canada
- Playing career: 1950–1954
Medal record
Men's ice hockey
Gold medal – first place	1951 Paris	Ice hockey

Bert Monroe Knibbs (March 3, 1924 – July 31, 1998), was a Canadian ice hockey player with the Lethbridge Maple Leafs. He won a gold medal at the 1951 World Ice Hockey Championships in Paris, France. The 1951 Lethbridge Maple Leafs team was inducted to the Alberta Sports Hall of Fame in 1974.
