= Stan Obodiac =

Canadian ice hockey player

- Born: February 7, 1922 Moose Jaw, Saskatchewan, Canada
- Died: November 3, 1984 (aged 62) North York, Ontario, Canada
- Height: 6 ft 0 in (183 cm)
- Weight: 185 lb (84 kg; 13 st 3 lb)
- Position: Left wing
- Shot: Left
- Played for: Lethbridge Maple Leafs
- National team: Canada
- Playing career: 1938–1955
Medal record
Men's ice hockey
Gold medal – first place	1951 Paris	Ice hockey

Stanley Obodiac (February 7, 1922 – November 3, 1984) was a Canadian ice hockey player with the Lethbridge Maple Leafs. He won a gold medal at the 1951 World Ice Hockey Championships in Paris, France. The 1951 Lethbridge Maple Leafs team was inducted to the Alberta Sports Hall of Fame in 1974. He was the leading scorer of the 1951 World Championship tournament.

Following his career as a hockey player, he remained employed in hockey as public relations director for the Toronto Maple Leafs and Maple Leaf Gardens. In this capacity, he wrote and published the history book The Leafs: The First 50 Years, which was a finalist for the Toronto Book Awards in 1977.

He was the Social Credit candidate for Yorkton at the 1953 Canadian federal election, coming in third to George Hugh Castleden.
