= Leo Lucchini =

Canadian ice hockey player

- Born: August 12, 1927 Cadomin, Alberta, Canada
- Died: August 4, 1991 (aged 63) Trail, British Columbia, Canada
- Height: 5 ft 7 in (170 cm)
- Weight: 170 lb (77 kg; 12 st 2 lb)
- Position: Left wing
- Played for: Edmonton Mercurys
- National team: Canada
- Playing career: 1946–1960
Medal record
Men's ice hockey
Gold medal – first place	1950 London	Ice hockey

Leo Oswald Lucchini (August 12, 1927 – August 4, 1991) was a Canadian ice hockey player with the Edmonton Mercurys. He won a gold medal at the 1950 World Ice Hockey Championships in London, England. The 1950 Edmonton Mercurys team was inducted to the Alberta Sports Hall of Fame in 2011. He also played with the San Francisco Shamrocks, New Westminster Royals, Rossland Warriors and Vernon Canadians.

His grandson Jake Lucchini is a professional player in the Ottawa Senators organization.
