= Bob David (ice hockey) =

Canadian ice hockey player

- Born: April 17, 1918 North Battleford, Saskatchewan, Canada
- Died: June 25, 2001 (aged 82) Edmonton, Alberta, Canada
- Height: 5 ft 11 in (180 cm)
- Weight: 170 lb (77 kg; 12 st 2 lb)
- Position: Left wing
- Shot: Left
- Played for: Edmonton Mercurys
- National team: Canada
- Playing career: 1936–1950
Medal record
Men's ice hockey
| Gold medal – first place | 1950 London | Ice hockey |

Robert Joseph David (April 17, 1919 – June 25, 2001) was a Canadian ice hockey player with the Edmonton Mercurys. He won a gold medal at the 1950 World Ice Hockey Championships in London, England. The 1950 Edmonton Mercurys team was inducted to the Alberta Sports Hall of Fame in 2011. He also played with the Vancouver Canucks in the PCHL.
