= Don Barry (Canadian football) =

Canadian football player (1931–2014)

Profile
- Position: Centre

Personal information
- Born: June 23, 1931; Edmonton, Alberta, Canada
- Died: May 30, 2014 (aged 82); Canmore, Alberta, Canada
- Listed height: 5 ft 11 in (1.80 m)
- Listed weight: 215 lb (98 kg)

Career history
- 1952–1962: Edmonton Eskimos

Awards and highlights
- Grey Cup champion (1954, 1955, 1956)

Donald Joseph Barry (June 23, 1931 – May 30, 2014) was a Canadian professional football player who played for the Edmonton Eskimos. He won the Grey Cup with them in 1954, 1955 and 1956. Barry was born in Edmonton He was inducted into the Alberta Sports Hall of Fame in 2007 and the City of Edmonton's Hall of Fame in 2010. Don also contributed to Canadian football as a coach in Edmonton: St. Joseph’s High School; St. Anthony’s College, Edmonton Huskies, Edmonton Wildcats, and the University of Alberta Golden Bears (1967-1979: earning two Vanier Cups). He was proud to have been a guest coach (Offensive Line) in the 1987 CFL Players Association All-Star Game. He was married to Susan Kay Middlemiss in 1991. They later retired to Canmore, Alberta where he died in 2014.
