= Andy Clovechok =

Canadian ice hockey player

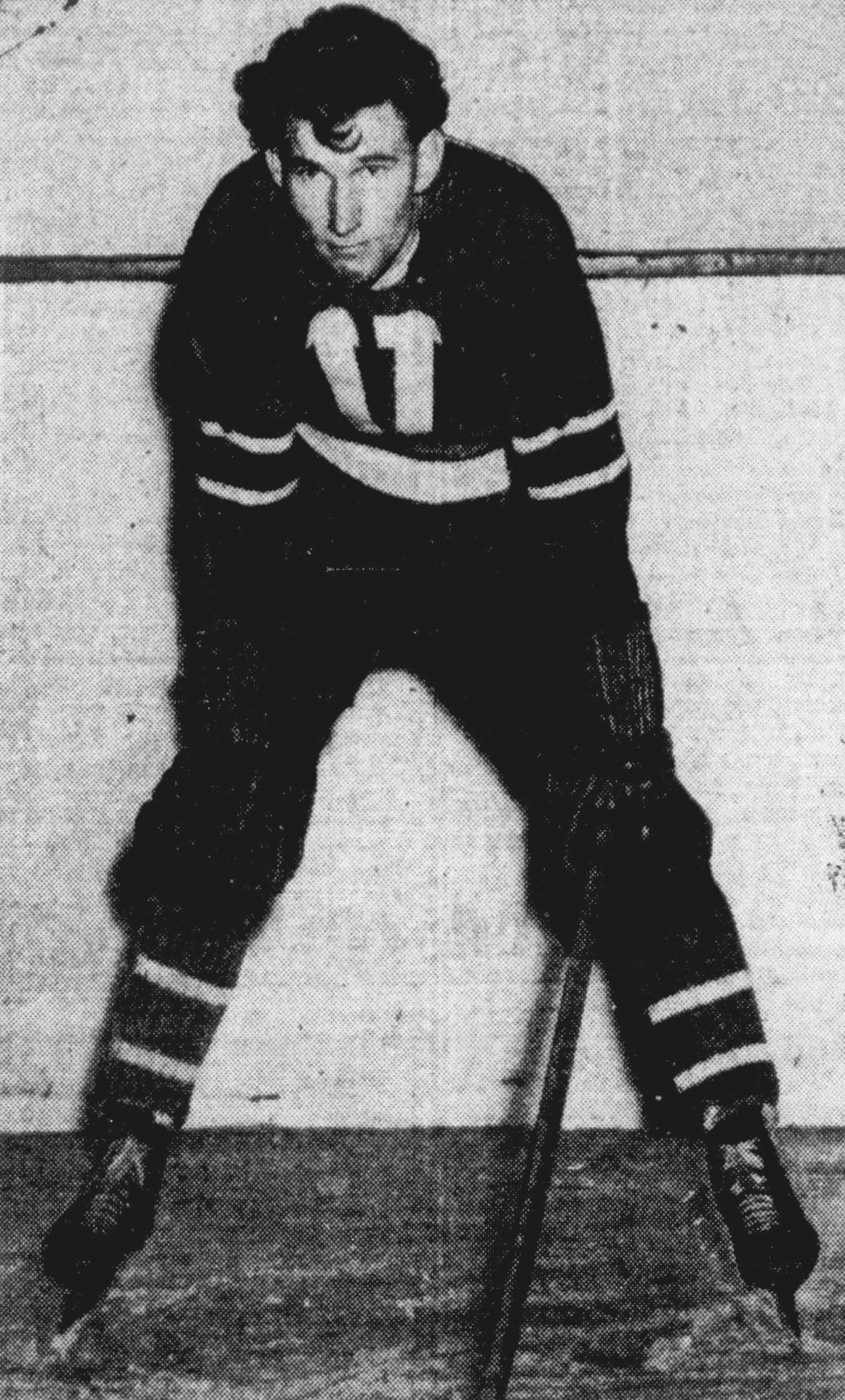
- Clovechok, circa 1946
- Born: April 10, 1923; Košice, Slovakia
- Died: December 9, 2016 (aged 93); Kamloops, British Columbia, Canada
- Height: 6 ft 0 in (183 cm)
- Weight: 160 lb (73 kg; 11 st 6 lb)
- Position: Right wing
- Shot: Right
- Played for: Vancouver Canucks
- Playing career: 1942–1955

Andrew Clovechok (April 10, 1923 – December 9, 2016) was a Canadian professional hockey player who played for the Vancouver Canucks in the Pacific Coast Hockey Association, for which he played 114 games, scoring 175 points. He also played for the Edmonton Flyers and Kamloops Elks. He is a member of the Alberta Sports Hall of Fame as well as the B.C. Sports Hall of Fame. Clovechok grew up in Rosedale, Alberta. He died in Kamloops in 2016. Clovechok has been inducted into at least five halls of fame.
