= Wilbert Delaney =

Canadian ice hockey player

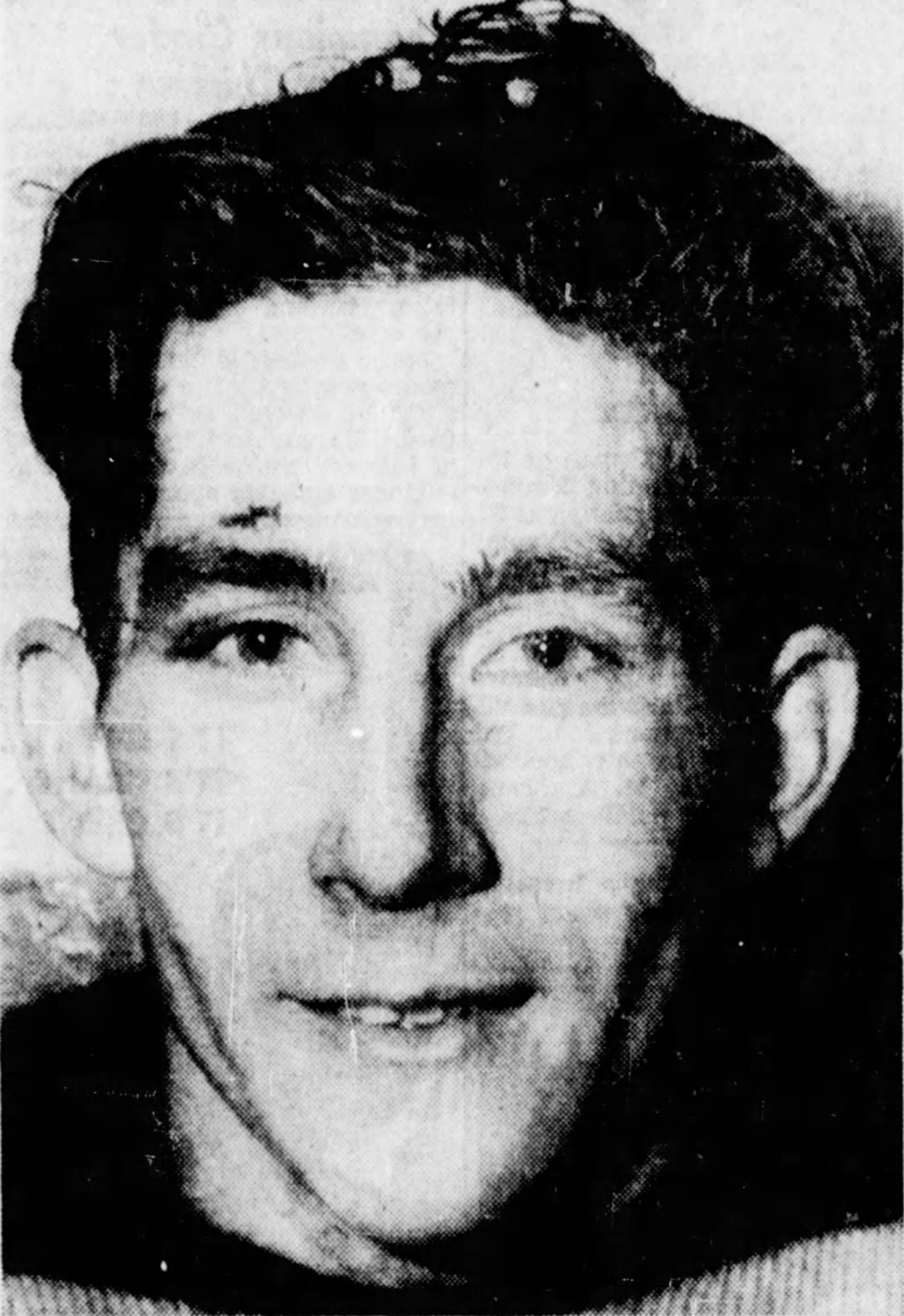
- Delaney pictured in a 1942 newspaper
- Born: July 26, 1922 Wilkie, Saskatchewan, Canada
- Died: November 13, 2000 (aged 78) Edmonton, Alberta, Canada
- Position: Goaltender
- Played for: Edmonton Mercurys
- National team: Canada
- Playing career: 1940–1952
Medal record
Men's ice hockey
Gold medal – first place	1950 London	Ice hockey

Wilbert Gabriel Delaney (July 26, 1922 – November 13, 2000) was a Canadian ice hockey player with the Edmonton Mercurys. He won a gold medal at the 1950 World Ice Hockey Championships in London, England. The 1950 Edmonton Mercurys team was inducted to the Alberta Sports Hall of Fame in 2011. He previously played with the Edmonton Maple Leafs and Camrose Maroons.
