= Marsh Darling =

Canadian ice hockey player

- Born: January 31, 1919 Edinburgh, Scotland
- Died: October 27, 2009 (aged 90) Edmonton, Alberta, Canada
- Height: 6 ft 0 in (183 cm)
- Weight: 180 lb (82 kg; 12 st 12 lb)
- Position: Right wing
- Shot: Right
- Played for: Edmonton Mercurys
- National team: Canada
- Playing career: 1935–1950
Medal record
Men's ice hockey
Gold medal – first place	1950 London	Ice hockey

Marshall William Darling (January 31, 1919 – October 27, 2009) was a Canadian ice hockey player with the Edmonton Mercurys. He won a gold medal at the 1950 World Ice Hockey Championships in London, England. The 1950 Edmonton Mercurys team was inducted to the Alberta Sports Hall of Fame in 2011. He previously played with the Lethbridge Maple Leafs and Edmonton athletic Club.
