= Phil Varone (ice hockey) =

Canadian ice hockey player

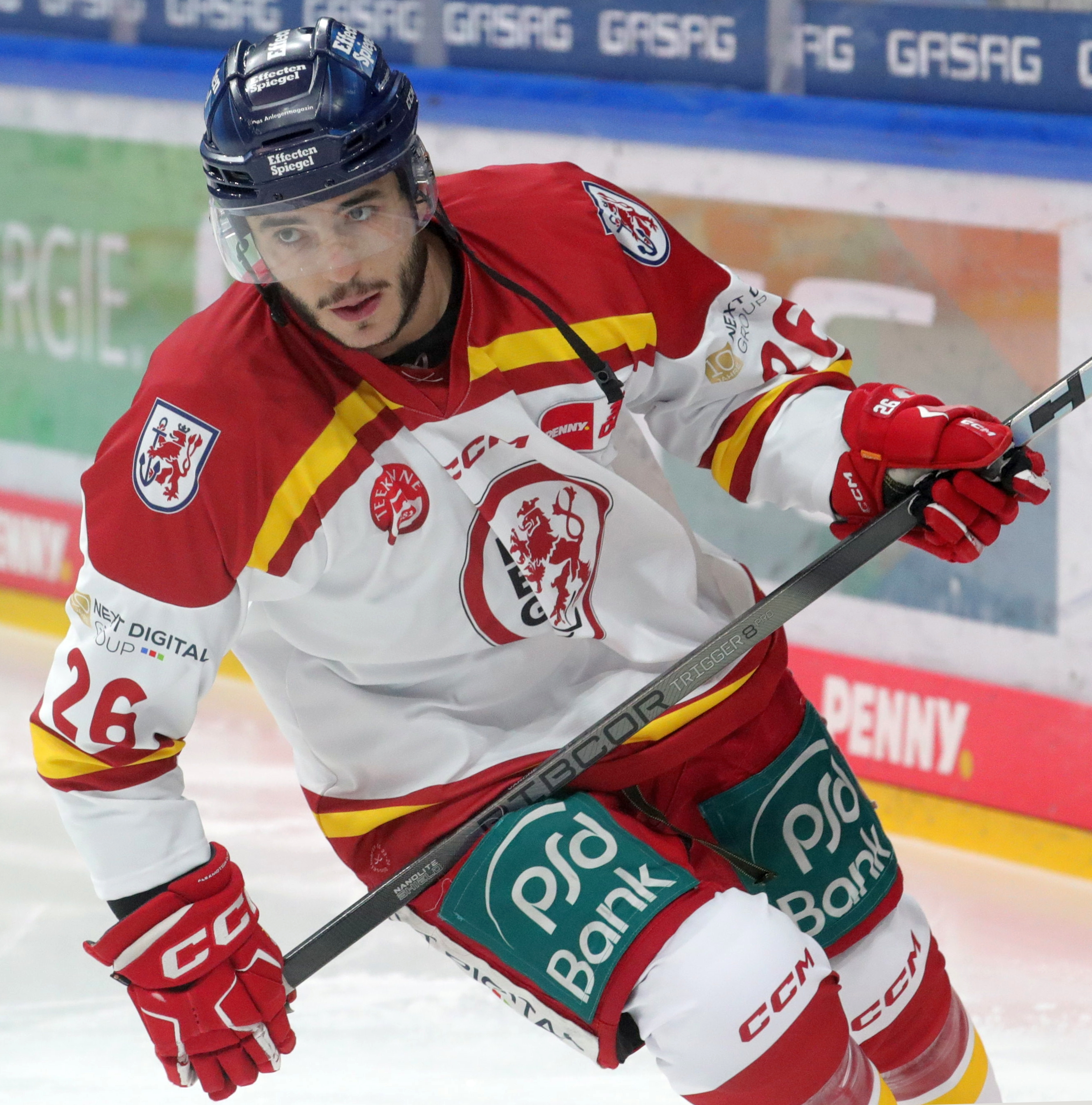
- Varone with the Düsseldorfer EG in 2023
- Born: December 4, 1990 (age 35) Vaughan, Ontario, Canada
- Height: 5 ft 10 in (178 cm)
- Weight: 185 lb (84 kg; 13 st 3 lb)
- Position: Forward
- Shoots: Left
- DEL team Former teams: Grizzlys Wolfsburg; Buffalo Sabres; Ottawa Senators; Philadelphia Flyers; Barys Nur-Sultan; Lausanne HC; SC Bern; Spartak Moscow; Düsseldorfer EG
- NHL draft: 147th overall, 2009; San Jose Sharks
- Playing career: 2011–present

Philip Varone (born December 4, 1990) is a Canadian professional ice hockey forward for Grizzlys Wolfsburg of the Deutsche Eishockey Liga (DEL). He was selected in the fifth round, 147th overall, by the San Jose Sharks of the National Hockey League (NHL) in the 2009 NHL entry draft and has previously played for the Buffalo Sabres, Ottawa Senators, and Philadelphia Flyers.

== Playing career ==
=== Amateur ===
Varone played major junior hockey in the Ontario Hockey League (OHL) from 2006–07 to 2010–11, collecting 78 goals and 152 assists for 230 points in 228 games.

=== Professional ===
Varone attended the San Jose Sharks training camp in 2010, but was sent down to London for the season. By July 2011, the Sharks had not signed Varone to a contract, making him a free agent. Varone attended the Buffalo Sabres training camp in 2011, but did not make the team. He instead signed a one-year AHL contract with the Sabres' affiliate Rochester Americans of the American Hockey League (AHL). He led Rochester in scoring with 11 goals and 41 assists.

On March 19, 2012, the Buffalo Sabres signed Varone to a three-year entry-level contract. Varone was recalled to the Sabres' active roster on January 22, 2014, and scored his first career point with an assist on a goal by Brian Flynn the next night against the Carolina Hurricanes. Varone scored his first goal in his fourth career game, against Braden Holtby of the Washington Capitals on January 28, 2014. During the 2013-2014 season, Varone also played for the Rochester Americans in the 2013 Spengler Cup, scoring 1 goal and 3 assists.

Following the 2014–15 season, Varone became a restricted free agent under the NHL Collective Bargaining Agreement. The Buffalo Sabres made him a qualifying offer to retain his NHL rights and, on July 5, 2015, Varone filed for salary arbitration. The two sides reached an agreement on a one-year, two-way contract on July 13.

In the 2015–16 season, Varone played in a further five games with the Sabres, but was on assignment with the Rochester Americans when on February 27, 2016, he was traded to the Ottawa Senators as part of a seven-player deal. Varone was called up to Ottawa for the final game of the season, April 9, 2016 and recorded an assist. In the following 2016–17 season, Varone split between Ottawa and their American Hockey League affiliate, the Binghamton Senators. Serving as an alternate captain he appeared in 65 regular season games for Binghamton, where he recorded 36 assists and 51 points. He was scoreless over 7 games in the NHL with Ottawa.

On July 1, 2017, having left the Senators as a free agent, Varone signed a two-year, two-way contract with the Philadelphia Flyers. At the end of the 2017–18 regular season, Varone was named the AHL's Most Valuable Player.

On December 7, 2018, Varone was recalled by the Flyers. He made his Flyers debut on December 8 against the Buffalo Sabres. He scored his first goal as a member of the Flyers on December 22 in a 4–3 loss to the Columbus Blue Jackets.

As a free agent Varone left the Flyers to sign a one-year, two-way contract with the Montreal Canadiens on July 3, 2019. Assigned to AHL affiliate, the Laval Rocket, to begin the 2019–20 season, Varone although limited through injury contributed with 14 points in 27 games. On February 20, 2020, Varone was traded by the Canadiens along with Riley Barber to the Pittsburgh Penguins in exchange for Joseph Blandisi and Jake Lucchini. He was immediately assigned to join affiliate, the Wilkes-Barre/Scranton Penguins. Varone registered 5 assists in just 6 games before the remainder of the season was cancelled due to the COVID-19 pandemic.

With the following North American season delayed due to the pandemic, Varone as a free agent opted to sign abroad for the first time in his career, joining Kazakhstani based club, Barys Nur-Sultan of the KHL on October 26, 2020.

On July 7, 2021, Varone joined Lausanne HC of the National League (NL) on a one-year deal. On November 17, 2021, Varone was shipped to SC Bern for the remainder of his contract.

As a free agent from Bern, Varone returned to the KHL in agreeing to a one-year deal with HC Spartak Moscow on July 21, 2022. In the 2022–23 season, Varone eclipsed his previous league high offensive totals in contributing with 15 goals and 30 points through 57 regular season games.

== Career statistics ==
			Regular season					Playoffs
Season	Team	League	GP	G	A	Pts	PIM	GP	G	A	Pts	PIM
2006–07	Kitchener Dutchmen	MWJHL	20	10	11	21	21	—	—	—	—	—
2006–07	Kitchener Rangers	OHL	13	1	3	4	2	—	—	—	—	—
2007–08	Kitchener Rangers	OHL	36	5	20	25	12	—	—	—	—	—
2007–08	London Knights	OHL	31	10	26	36	14	5	1	1	2	7
2008–09	London Knights	OHL	58	19	33	52	32	14	10	9	19	19
2009–10	London Knights	OHL	31	9	22	31	17	—	—	—	—	—
2010–11	London Knights	OHL	4	1	0	1	2	—	—	—	—	—
2010–11	Erie Otters	OHL	55	33	48	81	30	7	3	10	13	4
2011–12	Rochester Americans	AHL	76	11	41	52	42	3	2	1	3	0
2012–13	Rochester Americans	AHL	62	11	24	35	42	3	0	0	0	2
2013–14	Rochester Americans	AHL	69	18	43	61	58	5	0	3	3	0
2013–14	Buffalo Sabres	NHL	9	1	1	2	4	—	—	—	—	—
2014–15	Rochester Americans	AHL	55	15	29	44	22	—	—	—	—	—
2014–15	Buffalo Sabres	NHL	28	3	2	5	10	—	—	—	—	—
2015–16	Rochester Americans	AHL	44	13	19	32	20	—	—	—	—	—
2015–16	Buffalo Sabres	NHL	5	1	1	2	2	—	—	—	—	—
2015–16	Binghamton Senators	AHL	21	6	17	23	8	—	—	—	—	—
2015–16	Ottawa Senators	NHL	1	0	1	1	0	—	—	—	—	—
2016–17	Ottawa Senators	NHL	7	0	0	0	2	—	—	—	—	—
2016–17	Binghamton Senators	AHL	65	15	36	51	22	—	—	—	—	—
2017–18	Lehigh Valley Phantoms	AHL	74	23	47	70	36	7	0	3	3	2
2018–19	Lehigh Valley Phantoms	AHL	22	11	17	28	6	—	—	—	—	—
2018–19	Philadelphia Flyers	NHL	47	3	4	7	8	—	—	—	—	—
2019–20	Laval Rocket	AHL	27	4	10	14	8	—	—	—	—	—
2019–20	Wilkes-Barre/Scranton Penguins	AHL	6	0	5	5	6	—	—	—	—	—
2020–21	Barys Nur-Sultan	KHL	42	9	16	25	42	4	1	1	2	2
2021–22	Lausanne HC	NL	13	2	5	7	10	—	—	—	—	—
2021–22	SC Bern	NL	29	6	12	18	14	—	—	—	—	—
2022–23	Spartak Moscow	KHL	57	15	15	30	18	—	—	—	—	—
2023–24	Düsseldorfer EG	DEL	34	11	16	27	12	—	—	—	—	—
2024–25	Grizzlys Wolfsburg	DEL	52	6	23	29	18	—	—	—	—	—
NHL totals			97	8	9	17	26	—	—	—	—	—
KHL totals			99	24	31	55	60	4	1	1	2	2
