= Jimmy Kilburn =

Canadian ice hockey player

- Born: November 22, 1922 Wilkie, Saskatchewan, Canada
- Died: February 23, 2008 (aged 85) Edmonton, Alberta, Canada
- Height: 5 ft 7 in (170 cm)
- Weight: 170 lb (77 kg; 12 st 2 lb)
- Position: Defenseman
- Played for: Edmonton Mercurys
- National team: Canada
- Playing career: 1940–1952
Medal record
Men's ice hockey
Gold medal – first place	1950 London	Ice hockey

Morley James Kilburn (November 22, 1922 – February 23, 2008) was a Canadian ice hockey player with the Edmonton Mercurys. He won a gold medal at the 1950 World Ice Hockey Championships in London, England. The 1950 Edmonton Mercurys team was inducted to the Alberta Sports Hall of Fame in 2011.
