= Doug MacAuley =

Canadian ice hockey player

- Born: July 22, 1929 Drumheller, Alberta, Canada
- Died: September 2, 2009 (aged 80) Edmonton, Alberta, Canada
- Height: 5 ft 7 in (170 cm)
- Weight: 155 lb (70 kg; 11 st 1 lb)
- Position: Right wing
- Shot: Right
- Played for: Edmonton Mercurys; Seattle Bombers; Victoria Cougars; Los Angeles Blades; Portland Buckaroos
- National team: Canada
- Playing career: 1948–1963
Medal record
Men's ice hockey
Gold medal – first place	1950 London	Ice hockey

Douglas William MacAuley (July 22, 1929 – September 2, 2009) was a Canadian ice hockey player with the Edmonton Mercurys. He won a gold medal at the 1950 World Ice Hockey Championships in London, England. The 1950 Edmonton Mercurys team was inducted to the Alberta Sports Hall of Fame in 2011. He later played with the Spokane Flyers, Seattle Bombers, Victoria Cougars, Los Angeles Blades, and Portland Buckaroos.
