= Stantec =

Professional services company in the design and consulting industry

Stantec Inc.
- Type: Public
- Traded as: TSX: STN; NYSE: STN
- Industry: Professional services; Architecture design; Engineering; Civil engineering
- Founded: 1954; 72 years ago in Edmonton, Alberta, Canada
- Founder: Don Stanley
- Headquarters: Edmonton, Alberta, Canada
- Number of locations: 450
- Area served: Worldwide
- Key people: Board of Directors: Aram H. Keith (Chairman); Gord Johnston (CEO) (Director); Douglas K. Ammerman (Director); Dr. Delores M. Etter (Director); Anthony P. Franceschini (Director); Susan E. Hartman (Director); Donald J. Lowry (Director); Ivor M. Ruste (Director)
- Revenue: ▲CAD $4.28 billion (2018); $4.827 billion (2019)
- Total assets: ▲CAD $4.561 billion (2019); $4.009 billion (2018)
- Total equity: ▲CAD $1.91 Billion (2018); $1.90 billion (2017)
- Number of employees: 30,000 (2024)
- Website: Official website

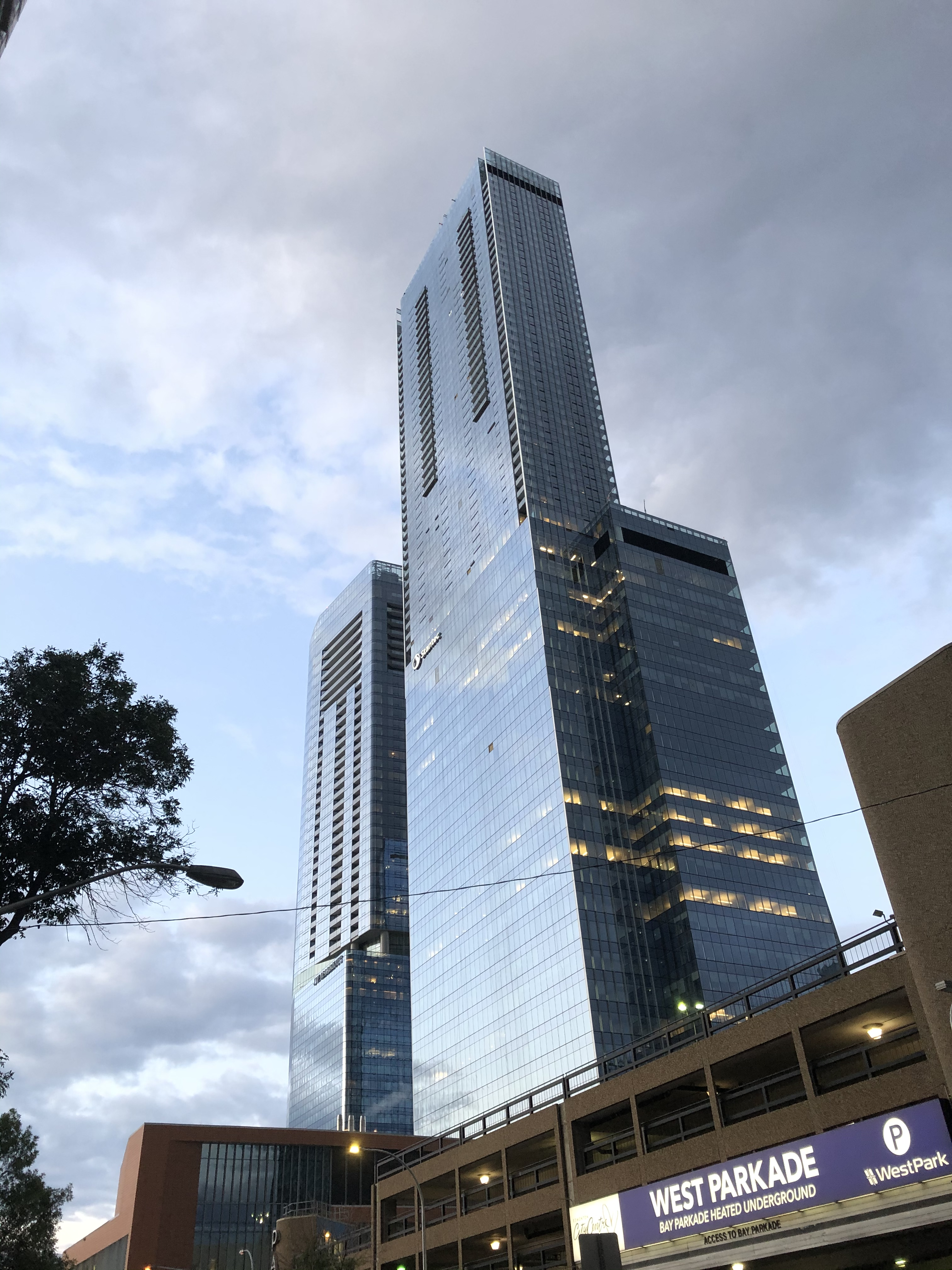
Stantec's head office in Edmonton

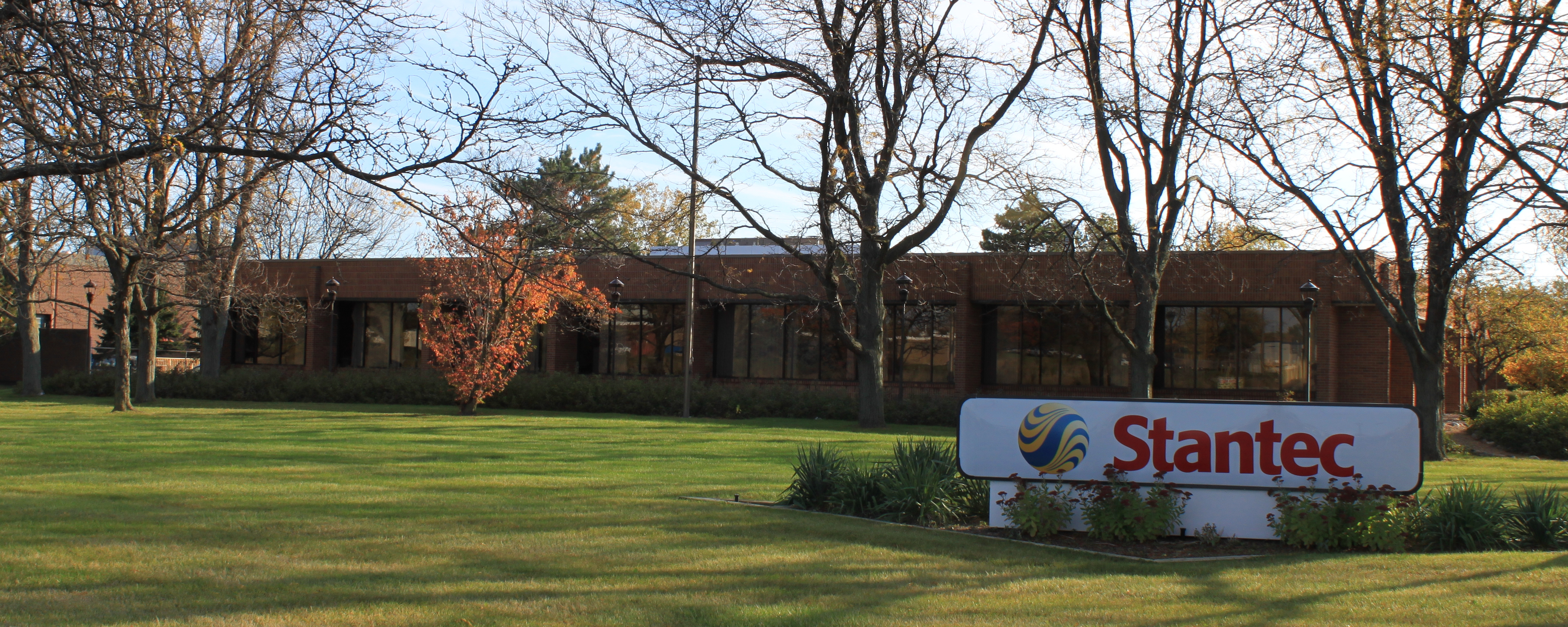
Stantec Consulting Michigan, Ann Arbor

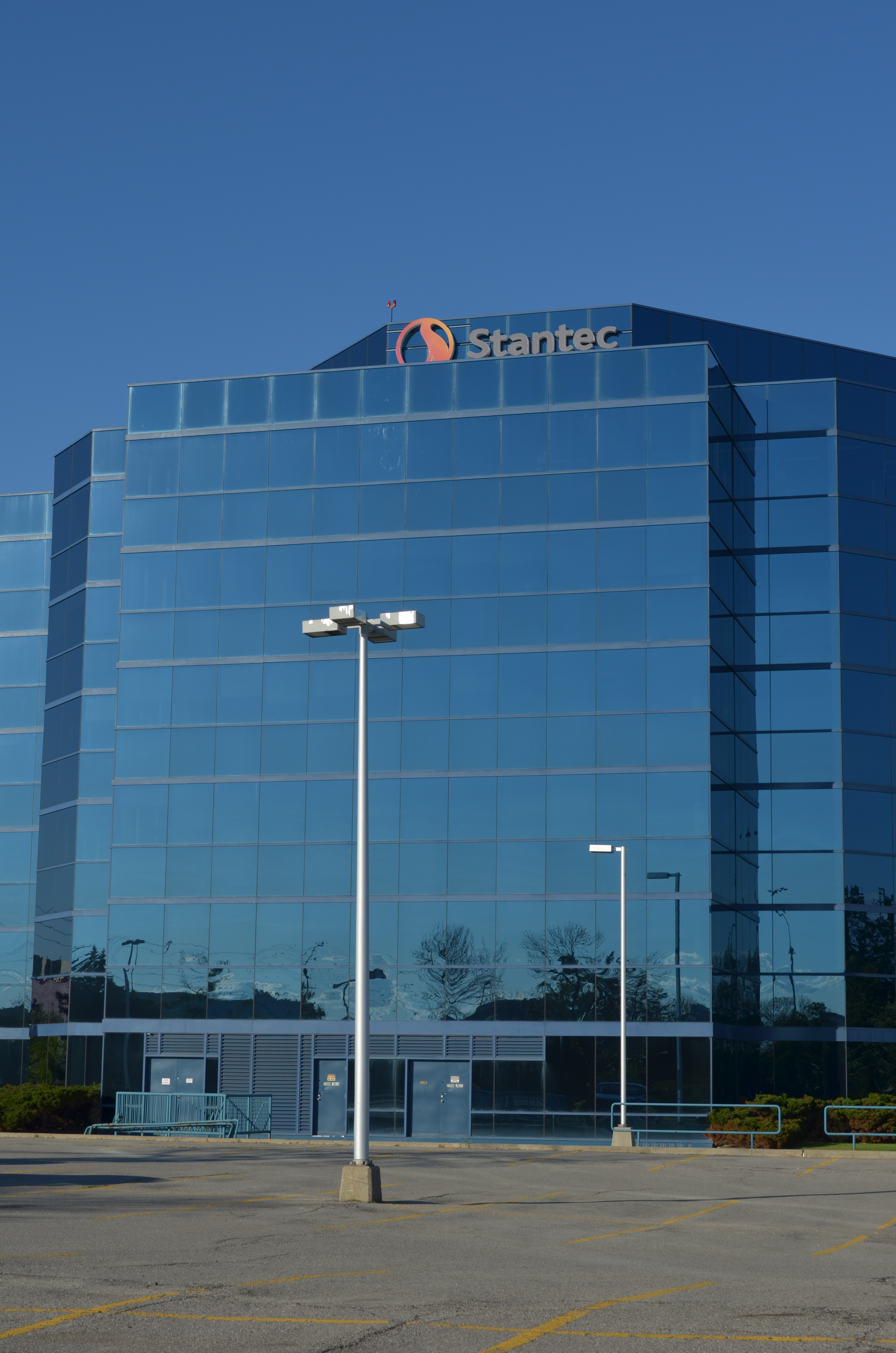
Stantec office in Ontario

Stantec Inc. is a multinational professional services company in the design and consulting industry. The company was founded in 1954, as D. R. Stanley Associates in Edmonton, Alberta, Canada. Stantec provides professional consulting services in planning, engineering, architecture, interior design, landscape architecture, surveying, environmental sciences, project management, and project economics for infrastructure and facilities projects. The company provides services on projects around the world, with over 32,000 employees operating out of more than 450 locations in North America and across offices on six continents.

== History ==
Don Stanley was the first Canadian to earn a Ph.D. in environmental engineering. Attending Harvard University on a Rockefeller Foundation scholarship, he earned his doctorate in 1952 and two years later founded D.R. Stanley & Associates, working as the sole proprietor out of a 250-square-foot (23 m^{2}) office in Edmonton, Alberta. In 1955, Stanley hired a retired railway engineer, Herb Roblin, and a former chief bridge engineer for the provincial government, Louis Grimble. The firm was renamed Stanley, Grimble and Roblin Ltd. and with the two new partners’ transportation backgrounds, the firm diversified quickly.

The 1970s were boom years for Stanley Associates, but with the advance of the sharp recession of the 1980s, Stanley was ready to turn the company over to his second-in-command, Ron Triffo, in 1983. Triffo held a bachelor's degree in civil engineering from the University of Manitoba and an MSc in Engineering from the University of Illinois. In 1983, when Alberta's economy was struggling in response to the Canadian government's National Energy Program, Triffo became president and COO, while Stanley retained his role as CEO and chair. “We had cut our staff in half from 400 to about 200,” Triffo said. “We really started to think about a new way of doing things for the company. We were heavily involved in Alberta in a big, big way and therefore very vulnerable to the up and down cycles of the province. We decided we had to diversify the company in a discipline sense. We had to become more than just a civil engineering company and we had to diversify geographically.”

The company started its diversification by forming an urban development company under another name, IMC, which grew to 200 people. The diversification of Stanley Associates occurred by acquisition as well. The firm expanded into British Columbia and Saskatchewan and internationally, beginning a corporate move into central Canada. Stanley also made its first U.S. acquisition, in Phoenix, establishing a base for specialty services and future expansion in the US Southwest.

Following the success of IMC, Stanley Associates' various practices operated under boutique names, with as many as 20 different companies. By the early 1990s, the companies were placed under the umbrella of Stanley Technology Group, and most subsidiaries featured the name Stanley in their name. Staff numbers neared 900 and the firm went public on the Toronto Stock Exchange in 1994.

In 1998, Triffo stepped into the role of board chair, where he remained until retiring in 2011. Tony Franceschini, then vice president of the Commercial/Institutional sector and a board member, became president and CEO. Franceschini began his career with a consulting engineering firm in Toronto, Ontario in 1975 after graduating from the University of Waterloo with a degree in civil engineering, where he worked with Triffo.

The year Franceschini became president and CEO, Stantec had 2,000 employees in 40 offices and reported $185.5 million in gross revenue. “Our vision is to grow the company into a 10,000 employee, billion-dollar firm by 2008,” Franceschini said. Franceschini was instrumental in launching the new global, single-brand identity, Stantec, which enabled the company's services to be delivered through an integrated approach. “The move was a major achievement –– in a two-month period, we sought and received shareholder approval to change the name of over 30 companies,” says Franceschini.

Stantec was listed on the New York Stock Exchange in 2005. Franceschini retired in May 2009. Bob Gomes was appointed president and CEO. Like the Stantec's previous three presidents, Gomes is a licensed engineer who earned his degree in civil engineering from the University of Alberta and joined Stantec in 1988.

Between 2008 and 2011, gross revenue increased from $1.4 billion to $1.7 billion, the Stantec team grew from 8,000 staff to over 12,000 staff, the company acquired 16 firms, and strengthened its presence in markets across North America and internationally. According to Reuters, US Edition, "Its services are offered through more than 170 locations in North America and four locations internationally"

In May 2016, Stantec signed a definitive merger agreement with MWH Global, Inc. worth $1.04 billion CAD, making Stantec Inc. one of the world's top three global design firms. It expected to boost revenues by 60% a year, and increased the number of employees from 15,000 to 22,000.

Bob Gomes retired from Stantec in 2017. In January 2018, Gord Johnston became CEO of Stantec. Johnston has 30 years of private and public sector experience in the design and project management of infrastructure projects. Johnston has bachelor of science and master of engineering degrees in civil engineering from the University of Alberta, and is a registered professional engineer, certified project management professional, and Envision Sustainability Professional.

Gord Johnston retired from Stantec in 2026. In October 2026, Susan Reisbord became President and CEO of Stantec. With more than 30 years of experience in architecture, engineering, and environmental consulting, she has experience with Stantec's clients and communities. Susan joined Stantec in December 2021 through the acquisition of Cardno, where she was the Managing Director and CEO.

=== Growth ===
Stantec has 34,000 employees and 450 locations on six continents worldwide.

=== Acquisitions ===
Stantec has acquired over 130 firms since 1994. Acquisitions include MWH Global, Inc., KBR, Inc. Infrastructure Americas Division, Dessau engineering, Fay, Spofford & Thorndike, Sparling, Traffic Design Group, Cardno, ZETCON Engineering, and Hydrock. In August 2025, the company completed the acquisition of Page, an American architecture firm.

== Major projects ==
- Panama Canal Expansion
- Stantec Tower; 2014
- Open Hearth Park; 2013
- Telus Spark; 2011
- Blatchford Community; 2010
- Anthony Henday Drive Southeast; 2003-2007
- Keystone Pipeline & Keystone Expansion Project; 2005
- The Apollo – Saturn V Visitor Center; 1961-1972
- Tesla Diner & Drive-In

== Headquarters ==
On July 17, 2013, Stantec announced that it was going to initiate a request for proposal (RFP) to consolidate its Edmonton headquarters and other Edmonton offices into a single building. On August 26, 2014 the company announced that it had signed a 15-year lease with Edmonton's Arena District Partnership, a joint venture between the Katz Group and WAM Developments.

Stantec Tower is located in Edmonton's new downtown Ice District, and is a 66-storey, 250.8 metres (823 ft), mixed use skyscraper. It is the tallest building in Edmonton, and the tallest building in Western Canada and outside of Toronto.

== See also ==
- Lists of companies on the TSX
- S&P/TSX 60
