= John Short (journalist) =

Canadian sports journalist, broadcaster (1937–2024)

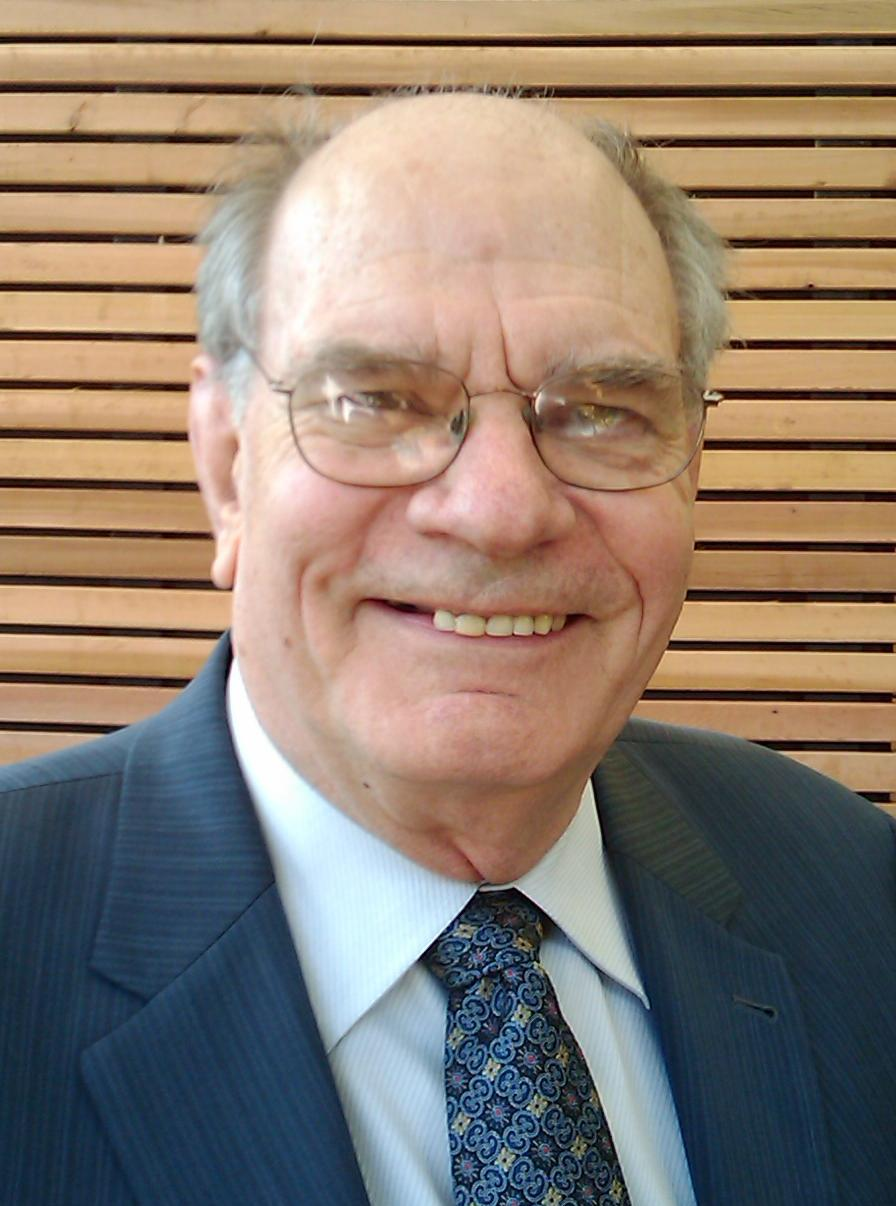
- Short in 2010
- Born: January 31, 1937; Toronto, Ontario, Canada
- Died: January 11, 2024 (aged 86)
- Occupation(s): Journalist, broadcaster
- Employer: Edmonton Sun

John Short (January 31, 1937 – January 11, 2024) was a Canadian sports journalist and broadcaster. He wrote a column for the Edmonton Sun. Short had formerly worked for the Canadian Press, Edmonton Journal, as well as the Edmonton Oilers as public relations director. He also hosted various sports-related radio shows.

Short was inducted into the Alberta Sports Hall of Fame in 1988, and was a recipient of the Chester Bell Memorial Award for excellence in sportswriting, as well as the Fred Sgambati National Award for university sports coverage. He served on the board of directors for the Alberta Sport Connection, and also served on the Canadian Sports Hall of Fame Selection Committee.

Short died on January 11, 2024, at the age of 86.
