= Jake Lucchini =

Canadian ice hockey player (born 1995)

- Born: May 9, 1995 (age 31) Trail, British Columbia, Canada
- Height: 6 ft 0 in (183 cm)
- Weight: 180 lb (82 kg; 12 st 12 lb)
- Position: Centre
- Shoots: Left
- NHL team (P) Cur. team Former teams: Nashville Predators; Milwaukee Admirals (AHL); Ottawa Senators; Minnesota Wild
- NHL draft: Undrafted
- Playing career: 2019–present

Jacob Leo Lucchini (born May 9, 1995) is a Canadian professional ice hockey centre for the Milwaukee Admirals of the American Hockey League (AHL) while under contract to the Nashville Predators of the National Hockey League (NHL). Originally undrafted by teams in the NHL, Lucchini has also previously played for the Ottawa Senators and Minnesota Wild.

== Playing career ==
=== Amateur ===
Lucchini played junior hockey for the Trail Smoke Eaters of the British Columbia Hockey League (BCHL). With Trail, scored 48 goals, 69 assists for 117 points in 168 games. He played National Collegiate Athletic Association (NCAA) Division I college hockey for Michigan Tech Huskies of the Western Collegiate Hockey Association (WCHA) for four seasons. In his first season with the Huskies in 2015–16 season He recorded seven goals and 17 points in 37 games and was named to the WCHA All-Rookie Team. In his sophomore season in 2016–17 he appeared in 45 games, scoring 11 goals and 22 points. In his junior season in 2017–18 season Lucchini was named an alternate captain and scored 16 goals and 39 points in 44 games, leading the team in scoring. He was named to the WCHA All-Academic Team. Lucchini played on two Michigan Tech championship teams. He was named co-captain of the Huskies in his senior year, and scored 11 goals and 26 points in 38 games.

=== Professional ===
While at Michigan Tech, Lucchini attended both the National Hockey League (NHL) Edmonton Oilers and Pittsburgh Penguins' prospect training camps. However, he went undrafted by NHL teams. After completing his senior season with Michigan Tech, he signed an entry-level contract with the Penguins. He was assigned to Pittsburgh's American Hockey League (AHL) affiliate, the Wilkes-Barre/Scranton Penguins, for the remainder of the 2018–19 season. He scored six goals and seven points in 15 games with Wilkes-Barre/Scranton. He began the 2019–20 season with Wilkes-Barre, appearing in 53 games, recording seven goals and 15 points. On February 20, 2020, Lucchini was traded by the Penguins along with Joseph Blandisi to the Montreal Canadiens in exchange for forwards Phil Varone and Riley Barber. He was immediately reassigned by the Canadiens to their AHL affiliate, the Laval Rocket. He finished the season playing in eight games, scoring four goals and five points, before the AHL suspended the season due to the COVID-19 pandemic on March 12. In the 2020 offseason, Lucchini signed a one-year, two-way contract with the Canadiens. He was assigned to Laval for the pandemic-shortened 2020–21 season and appeared in 28 games, scoring three goals and six points. Ahead of the 2021–22 season, Lucchini was traded by Laval to the Belleville Senators, the AHL affiliate of the Ottawa Senators, for future considerations. He had what was considered a "breakout" season with Belleville, scoring 20 goals and 51 points in 72 games. Belleville qualified for the 2022 Calder Cup playoffs and in two games, Lucchini recorded one assist.

As an unrestricted free agent, Lucchini was signed to a one-year, two-way NHL contract with the Ottawa Senators on July 13, 2022. After attending Ottawa's training camp, he was placed on waivers and after going unclaimed, was assigned to Belleville. During the 2022–23 season, Lucchini was called up to Ottawa and made his NHL debut on December 14, 2022, against the Canadiens. He scored the first NHL goal of his career on January 1, 2023, against the Buffalo Sabres. Lucchini was returned to Belleville after eleven games with Ottawa. He finished the season with 19 goals and 53 points in 61 games with Belleville and one goal in 11 games with Ottawa.

As an unrestricted free agent from the Senators, Lucchini was signed to a one-year, two-way contract with the Minnesota Wild for the 2023–24 season on July 1, 2023. He attended the Wild's 2023 training camp but failed to make the team. He was placed on waivers but went unclaimed and was assigned to Minnesota's AHL affiliate, the Iowa Wild, to begin the 2023–24 season. He was recalled on December 23 by Minnesota and made his debut for the team that night versus the Boston Bruins. After skating in four games going scoreless, he was returned to Iowa before being recalled to replace the injured Connor Dewar on January 20, 2024. He played in four more games before returning to Iowa again. His stay in Iowa was short-lived as he was once again recalled by Minnesota on February 5. He scored his first goal for Minnesota in a 2–1 win over the Chicago Blackhawks on February 7. He made a career best 40 appearances for Minnesota over the course of the season, notching two goals and five points. In 30 games with Iowa he registered 11 goals and 23 points.

Leaving the Wild at the conclusion of his contract, Lucchini was signed to a two-year, two-way contract with the Nashville Predators on July 1, 2024. He was assigned to Nashville's AHL affiliate, the Milwaukee Admirals, to start the 2024–25 season. He was recalled by Nashville on March 1, 2025 and made his Predators debut that night in a game against the New York Islanders. He played three games with Nashville, going scoreless, before being returned to Milwaukee on March 7. He finished the season with Milwaukee, scoring 21 goals and 45 points in 70 games. Milwaukee qualified for the playoffs and advanced to the Central Division finals, where they were knocked out of contention by the Texas Stars. In ten playoff games, Lucchini added one goal and five points. He returned to Milwaukee after being cut from the Predators' training camp ahead of the 2025–26 season. He was named one of the Admirals' alternate captains for the season. He spent the entire season with Milwaukee, registering 17 goals and 50 points in 63 appearances. Lucchini signed a one-year contract extension with Nashville on February 23, 2026. Milwaukee made the 2026 Calder Cup playoffs but were bounced in the first round by the Manitoba Moose. In three playoff games, Lucchini tallied one goal. Lucchini was assigned to Milwaukee at the beginning of the 2026–27 season after clearing waivers.

== Personal ==
Lucchini is the son of Sandy and John Lucchini. His younger brother Jeremy also played for the Trail Smoke Eaters in the British Columbia Hockey League (BCHL) and the two played one season together. Jeremy is now a professional player in Europe. His grandfather Leo Lucchini was a member of the Edmonton Mercurys that won the 1950 IIHF World Championship.

== Career statistics ==
			Regular season					Playoffs
Season	Team	League	GP	G	A	Pts	PIM	GP	G	A	Pts	PIM
2010–11	Beaver Valley NiteHawks	KIJHL	1	0	1	1	0	—	—	—	—	—
2011–12	Beaver Valley NiteHawks	KIJHL	9	4	9	13	4	12	2	6	8	2
2012–13	Trail Smoke Eaters	BCHL	55	5	3	8	17	—	—	—	—	—
2013–14	Trail Smoke Eaters	BCHL	55	8	18	26	12	—	—	—	—	—
2014–15	Trail Smoke Eaters	BCHL	58	35	47	82	32	—	—	—	—	—
2015–16	Michigan Tech	WCHA	37	7	10	17	10	—	—	—	—	—
2016–17	Michigan Tech	WCHA	45	11	11	22	20	—	—	—	—	—
2017–18	Michigan Tech	WCHA	44	16	23	39	8	—	—	—	—	—
2018–19	Michigan Tech	WCHA	38	11	15	26	14	—	—	—	—	—
2018–19	Wilkes-Barre/Scranton Penguins	AHL	15	6	1	7	2	—	—	—	—	—
2019–20	Wilkes-Barre/Scranton Penguins	AHL	53	7	8	15	10	—	—	—	—	—
2019–20	Laval Rocket	AHL	8	4	1	5	4	—	—	—	—	—
2020–21	Laval Rocket	AHL	28	3	3	6	6	—	—	—	—	—
2021–22	Belleville Senators	AHL	72	20	31	51	14	2	0	1	1	0
2022–23	Belleville Senators	AHL	61	19	34	53	6	—	—	—	—	—
2022–23	Ottawa Senators	NHL	11	1	0	1	0	—	—	—	—	—
2023–24	Iowa Wild	AHL	30	11	12	23	8	—	—	—	—	—
2023–24	Minnesota Wild	NHL	40	2	3	5	23	—	—	—	—	—
2024–25	Milwaukee Admirals	AHL	70	21	24	45	38	10	1	4	5	12
2024–25	Nashville Predators	NHL	3	0	0	0	2	—	—	—	—	—
2025–26	Milwaukee Admirals	AHL	63	17	33	50	23	3	1	0	1	2
NHL totals			54	3	3	6	25	—	—	—	—	—

== Awards and honours ==
Award	Year
BCHL
Second All-Star Team	2015
College
WCHA All-Rookie Team	2016
WCHA Champions	2017, 2018
