= Harry Allen (ice hockey) =

Canadian ice hockey player

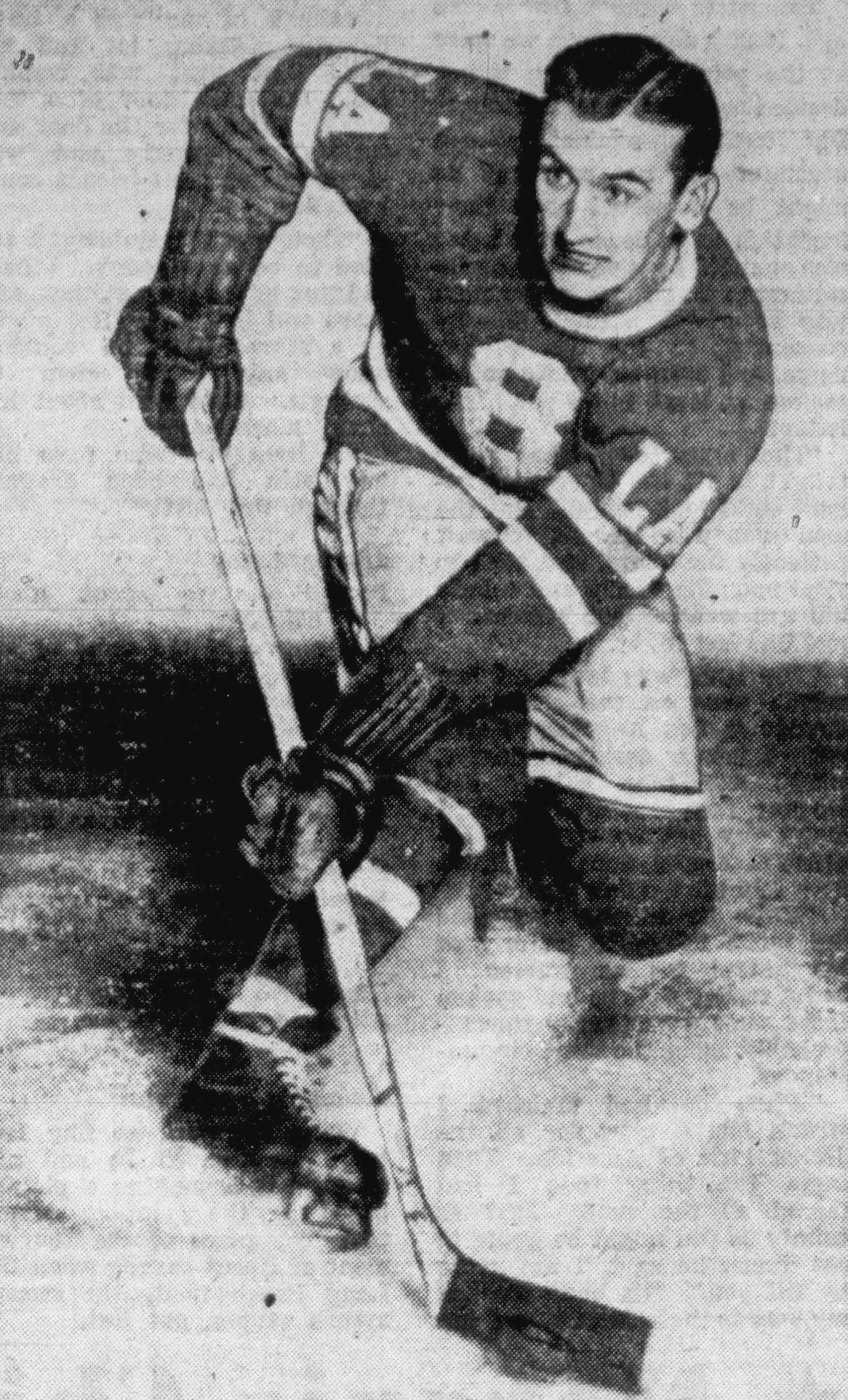
- Allen, circa 1946
- Born: January 23, 1923 Edmonton, Alberta, Canada
- Died: August 2, 1990 (aged 67) Edmonton, Alberta, Canada
- Height: 6 ft 0 in (183 cm)
- Weight: 165 lb (75 kg; 11 st 11 lb)
- Position: Center
- Shot: Left
- Played for: Edmonton Mercurys
- National team: Canada
- Playing career: 1940–1952
Medal record
Men's ice hockey
Gold medal – first place	1950 London	Ice hockey

Harold John Allen (January 23, 1923 – August 2, 1990) was a Canadian ice hockey player with the Edmonton Mercurys.

== Career ==
Allen won a gold medal at the 1950 World Ice Hockey Championships in London, England. The 1950 Edmonton Mercurys team was inducted to the Alberta Sports Hall of Fame in 2011. Allen, the brother of Keith Allen, also played in the PCHL for the Los Angeles Monarchs and Oakland Oaks. He later coached the Edmonton Oil Kings, and was named Edmonton's Sportsman of the Year after his Oil Kings team appeared in the 1959–60 Memorial Cup. Allen died on August 2, 1990, at the age of 67.
