= Tesla Diner =

Restaurant in Los Angeles, California, US

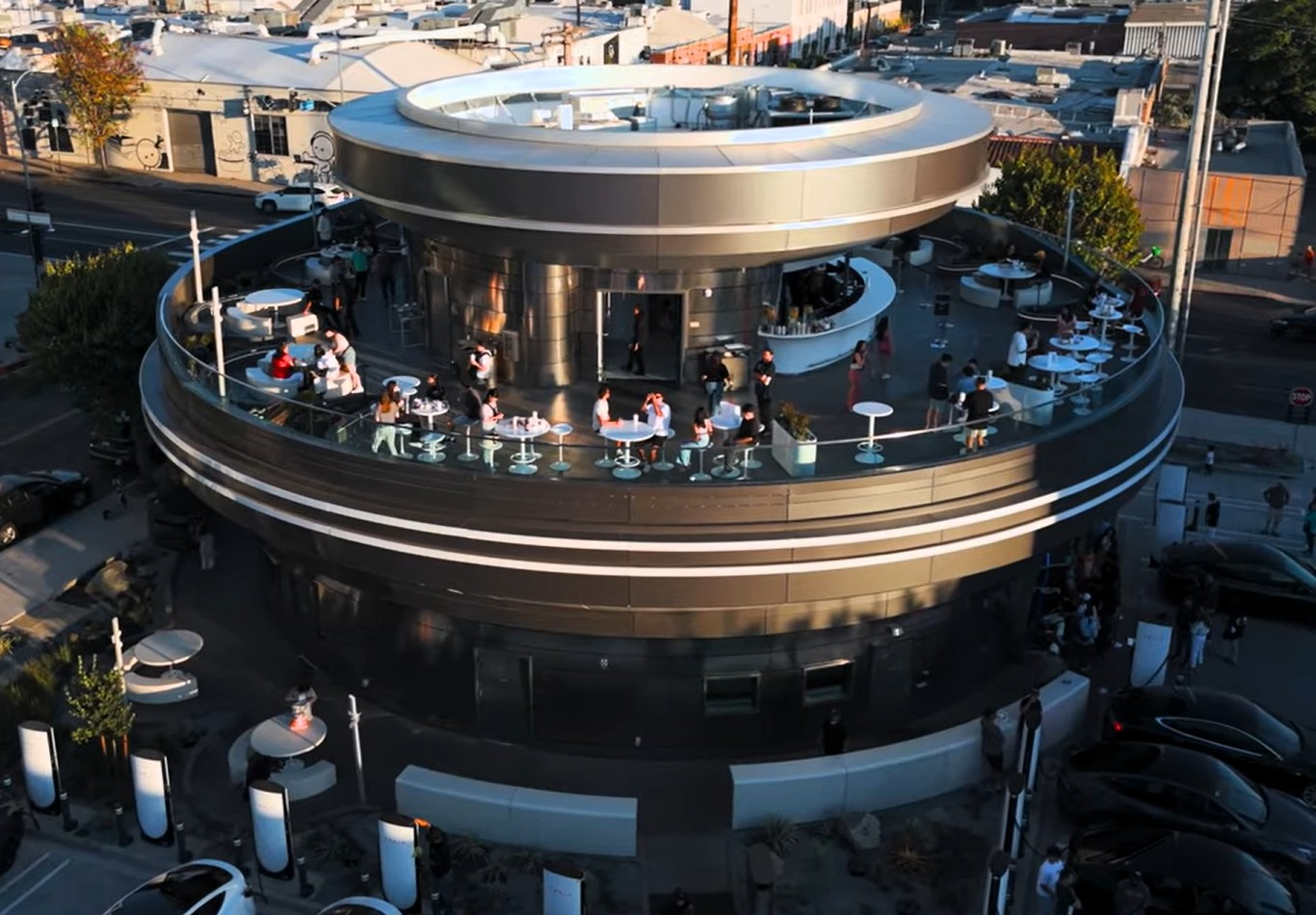
- The Tesla Diner in 2025
- Interactive map of Tesla Diner

Restaurant information
- Established: July 21, 2025
- Food type: American
- Location: 7001 Santa Monica Blvd, Los Angeles, United States
- Coordinates: 34.0909°N 118.3418°W
- Seating capacity: 250+
- Website: tesla.com/tesla-diner

The Tesla Diner is a restaurant on Santa Monica Boulevard in Los Angeles operated by Tesla, Inc. It serves traditional American cuisine such as burgers, hot dogs, and French fries and includes a drive-in theater and 75 V4 Supercharger stalls. It opened on July 21, 2025.

== History ==
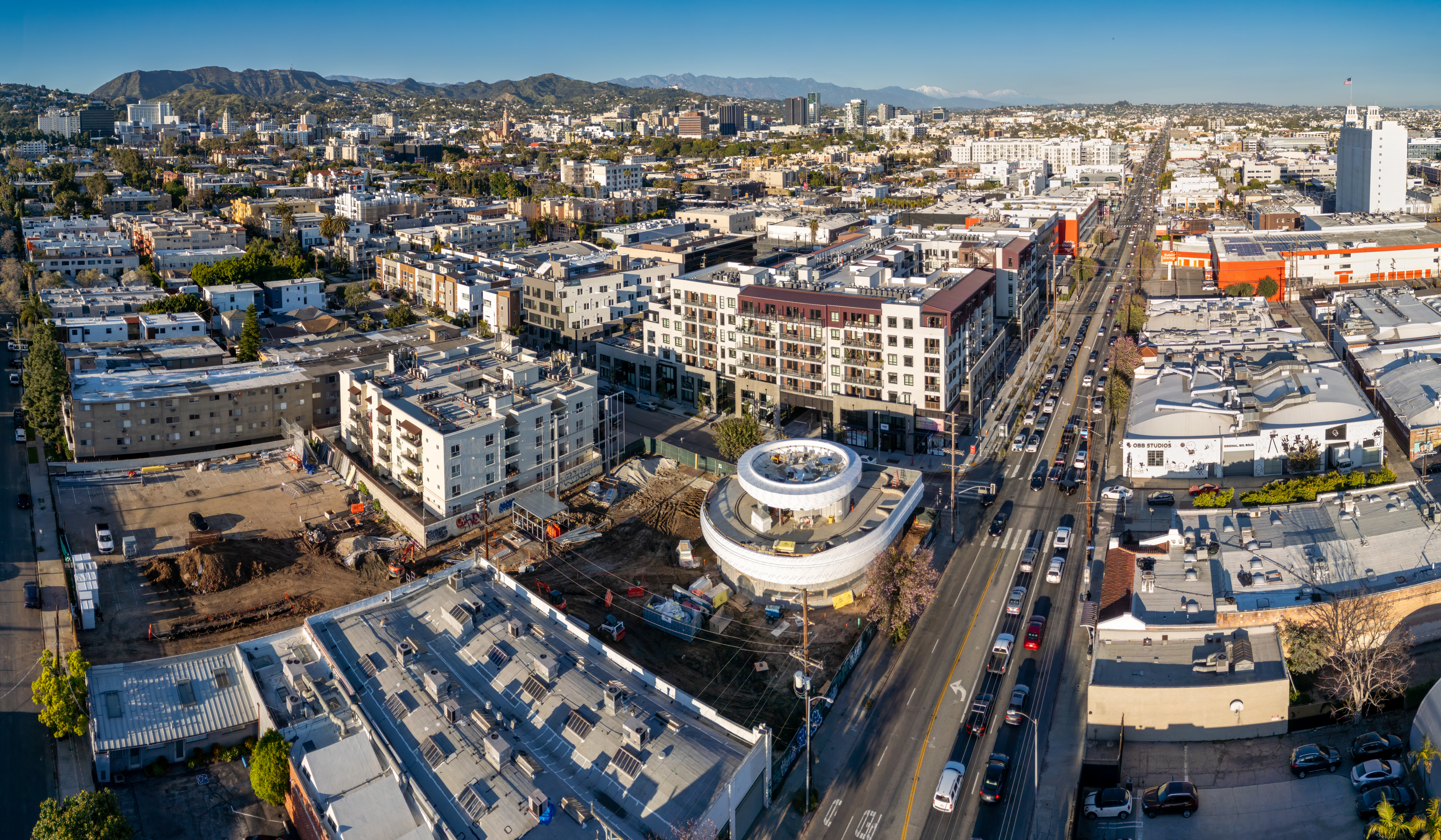
The Tesla Diner under construction in 2024

Elon Musk first announced the concept for the diner in 2018, and in 2023 confirmed Tesla would build a diner in Los Angeles which he described as being "Grease meets Jetsons with Supercharging." Tesla initially applied for a building permit at a lot located at 1401 Santa Monica Boulevard on the corner of 14th Street in Santa Monica. In 2022, it was announced it would be located at the site of a former Shakey's Pizza in Hollywood. The location is on the historic Route 66.

The building was designed by the architecture firm Stantec. The silver two story building has a space age design in the shape of a flying saucer. It features a restaurant, two movie screens, and charging stations for electric vehicles. In March 2025, longtime Los Angeles chef Eric Greenspan was announced as the restaurant's head chef.

Two weeks after opening, the restaurant reduced its menu to a smaller selection of items, and limited its 24-hour service only to those charging Tesla vehicles between the hours of midnight and 6 a.m. In October 2025, Tesla stated that it had sold 50,000 burgers since opening, averaging over 700 a day.

On November 18, 2025, The Los Angeles Times reported that Greenspan has severed his ties with the restaurant, and that it will shift to a full-service restaurant model.

The diner sometimes hosts special events on the upstairs deck, known as The Skypad.

== Reception ==
Jennifer A. Kingson, writing in Axios, said the restaurant may serve as a national blueprint, starting a new retail category of charge-and-dine restaurants. Gab Chabran, writing in LAist, said that Musk was looking to capitalize on the distinctive West Coast diner culture rooted in classic cars and cruising. Matt Novak, writing in Gizmodo, said that "I hate that I love it. And I really wish anyone else but Musk was building it right now."

In July 2025, the diner attracted protestors opposing Musk's political views and involvement in the second Trump administration. The attention brought to the diner has raised concerns among residents.

The Guardian reported that by December 2025 the diner had the "feel of a ghost town" and that the "novelty of eating at a restaurant owned by the richest person in the world seems to have worn off."
