= Riley Barber =

American ice hockey player (born 1994)

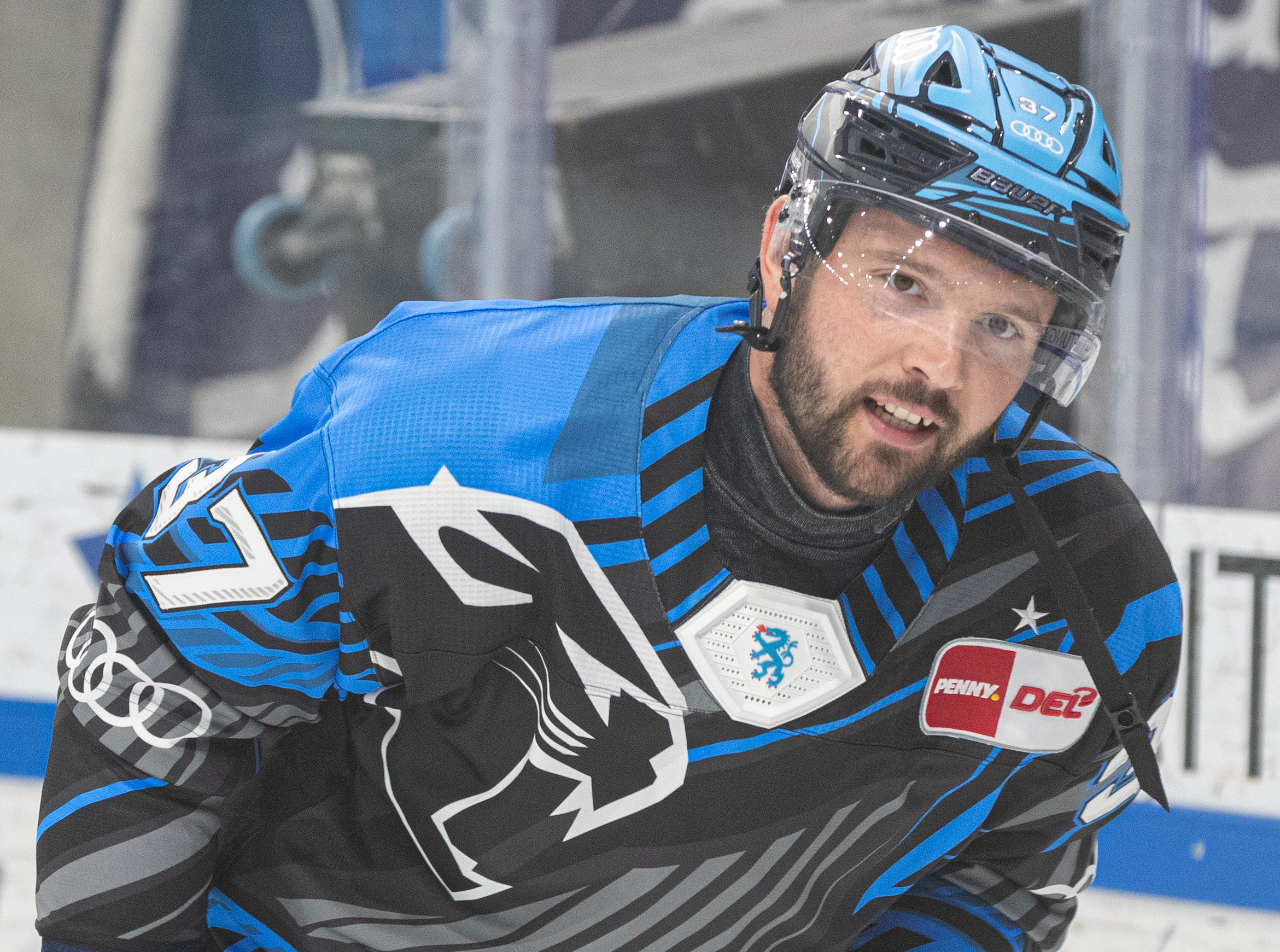
- Barber with the ERC Ingolstadt in 2025
- Born: February 7, 1994 (age 32) Pittsburgh, Pennsylvania, U.S.
- Height: 6 ft 0 in (183 cm)
- Weight: 193 lb (88 kg; 13 st 11 lb)
- Position: Right wing
- Shoots: Right
- DEL team Former teams: ERC Ingolstadt; Washington Capitals; Montreal Canadiens; Detroit Red Wings; Barys Astana; Ak Bars Kazan; Neftekhimik Nizhnekamsk
- National team: United States
- NHL draft: 167th overall, 2012; Washington Capitals
- Playing career: 2015–present

Riley Barber (born February 7, 1994) is a Canadian-American professional ice hockey forward who is currently playing under contract with ERC Ingolstadt of the Deutsche Eishockey Liga (DEL). Barber was selected by the Washington Capitals in the sixth round (167th overall) of the 2012 NHL entry draft. He is the son of former NHL player Don Barber.

== Playing career ==
As a youth, Barber played in the 2006 and 2007 Quebec International Pee-Wee Hockey Tournaments with the Pittsburgh Hornets, and then the Detroit Red Wings minor ice hockey teams.

Barber played college hockey for the Miami RedHawks of Miami University in Oxford, Ohio. In his freshman year, Barber's outstanding play was rewarded with a selection to the 2012–13 Central Collegiate Hockey Association All-Conference First Team. In 40 games, he tallied 15 goals and 24 assists for 39 points and was second in team scoring by then-sophomore Austin Czarnik. On December 22, 2013, during his sophomore season at Miami, Barber was named captain of the United States men's national junior ice hockey team for the 2014 World Junior Ice Hockey Championships. He had been a member of the 2013 United States squad that won gold.

On April 17, 2015, Barber chose to forego his senior year with Miami and signed a three-year entry-level deal with the Capitals. He was assigned to the Capitals' AHL affiliate, the Hershey Bears. He made his professional debut on October 10, 2015, registering two goals in a 5–1 win over the Springfield Falcons.

During the 2016–17 season, on February 24, 2017, Barber made his NHL debut with the Capitals against the Edmonton Oilers.

On December 7, 2018, the Capitals recalled Barber from Hershey after placing T. J. Oshie on injured reserve, though he did not play. He led the Bears with 18 points in 20 appearances for the season before being recalled.

On July 1, 2019, Barber joined the Montreal Canadiens as a free agent, agreeing to a one-year, two-way contract. After participating in the Canadiens training camp, Barber was waived on September 24, 2019. He was reassigned to the Canadiens minor league affiliate, Laval Rocket, to begin the 2019–20 season.

After leading the Rocket in points with 18 (6G, 12A) points in 21 games. The Canadiens decided to recall Barber to the NHL on December 8, 2019. This was his first NHL call-up since playing three NHL games with the Washington Capitals in the 2016–17 season. After playing eight games and registering zero points with the Montreal Canadiens, Barber was sent back to Laval. On February 20, 2020, while with Laval, Barber was traded by the Canadiens along with Phil Varone to the Pittsburgh Penguins in exchange for Joseph Blandisi and Jake Lucchini. He was assigned to join their affiliate, the Wilkes-Barre/Scranton Penguins.

On October 9, 2020, Barber signed a two-year, two-way contract with the Detroit Red Wings. On January 12, 2021, after recovering from an injury sustained while being called up (knee), the Red Wings assigned Barber to the Grand Rapids Griffins.

On July 14, 2022, Barber signed as a free agent to a one-year, two-way contract with the Dallas Stars.

Following the conclusion of his contract within the Stars organization, Barber opted to sign his first contract abroad, leaving North America in agreeing to a one-year contract with Kazakh based KHL club, Barys Astana, on August 3, 2023. During the 2023–24 season, on November 24, 2023, having posted 10 goals and 23 points through 28 games with Barys, Barber was traded to Russian club Ak Bars Kazan in exchange for Belarusian Kristian Khenkel.

After a season with Neftekhimik Nizhnekamsk, Barber left the KHL after two years and opted to sign a one-year deal with German club, ERC Ingolstadt of the DEL, on June 4, 2025.

== Career statistics ==
=== Regular season and playoffs ===
			Regular season					Playoffs
Season	Team	League	GP	G	A	Pts	PIM	GP	G	A	Pts	PIM
2010–11	Dubuque Fighting Saints	USHL	57	14	14	28	48	11	2	0	2	6
2011–12	U.S. National Development Team	USHL	24	5	6	11	59	—	—	—	—	—
2012–13	Miami RedHawks	CCHA	40	15	24	39	22	—	—	—	—	—
2013–14	Miami RedHawks	NCHC	38	19	25	44	28	—	—	—	—	—
2014–15	Miami RedHawks	NCHC	38	20	20	40	12	—	—	—	—	—
2015–16	Hershey Bears	AHL	74	26	29	55	34	17	1	3	4	24
2016–17	Hershey Bears	AHL	39	13	14	27	12	12	1	4	5	4
2016–17	Washington Capitals	NHL	3	0	0	0	0	—	—	—	—	—
2017–18	Hershey Bears	AHL	60	20	18	38	49	—	—	—	—	—
2018–19	Hershey Bears	AHL	64	31	29	60	84	9	3	3	6	4
2019–20	Laval Rocket	AHL	39	13	18	31	19	—	—	—	—	—
2019–20	Montreal Canadiens	NHL	9	0	0	0	2	—	—	—	—	—
2019–20	Wilkes-Barre/Scranton Penguins	AHL	7	3	3	6	6	—	—	—	—	—
2020–21	Grand Rapids Griffins	AHL	32	20	14	34	22	—	—	—	—	—
2021–22	Grand Rapids Griffins	AHL	49	28	25	53	24	—	—	—	—	—
2021–22	Detroit Red Wings	NHL	4	0	0	0	2	—	—	—	—	—
2022–23	Texas Stars	AHL	69	32	32	64	43	8	2	3	5	10
2023–24	Barys Astana	KHL	28	10	13	23	4	—	—	—	—	—
2023–24	Ak Bars Kazan	KHL	28	5	6	11	2	1	0	0	0	0
2024–25	Neftekhimik Nizhnekamsk	KHL	45	16	14	30	18	—	—	—	—	—
NHL totals			16	0	0	0	4	—	—	—	—	—
KHL totals			101	31	33	64	24	1	0	0	0	0

=== International ===
Year	Team	Event	Result	GP	G	A	Pts	PIM
2012	United States	U18	1st place, gold medalist(s)	6	1	2	3	2
2013	United States	WJC	1st place, gold medalist(s)	7	3	3	6	4
2014	United States	WJC	5th	5	4	2	6	0
2022	United States	WC	4th	9	1	0	1	2
Junior totals				18	8	7	15	6
Senior totals				9	1	0	1	2

== Awards and honors ==
Award	Year
College
All-CCHA Rookie Team	2012–13
All-CCHA First Team	2012–13
All-NCHC Second Team	2013–14
DEL
Forward of the year	2026

Awards and achievements
Preceded by Alex Guptill	CCHA Rookie of the Year; 2012–13	Succeeded by Award discontinued
