= Joseph Blandisi =

Canadian ice hockey player (born 1994)

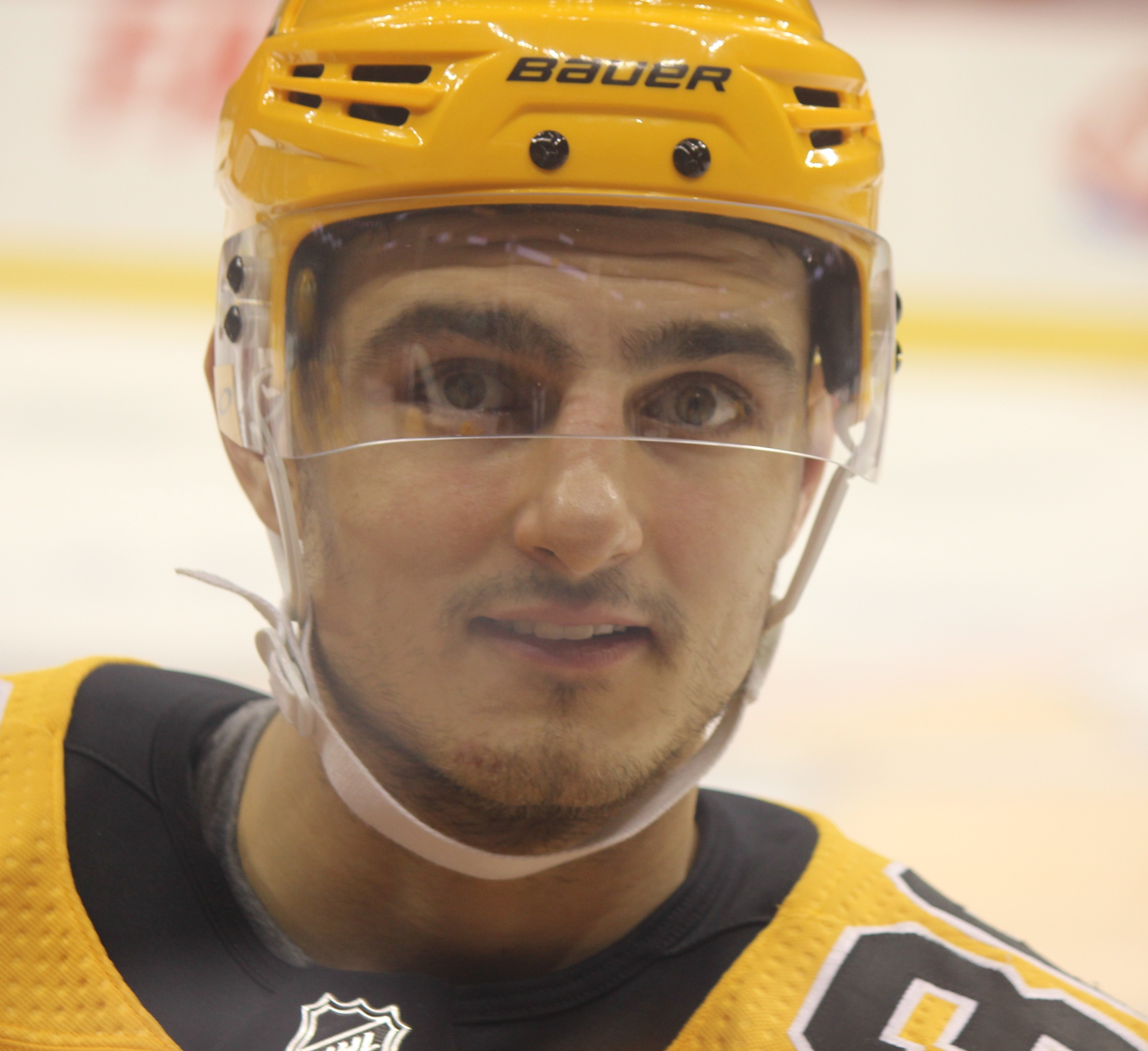
- Blandisi with the Pittsburgh Penguins in 2019
- Born: July 18, 1994 (age 32) Markham, Ontario, Canada
- Height: 6 ft 0 in (183 cm)
- Weight: 200 lb (91 kg; 14 st 4 lb)
- Position: Forward
- Shoots: Left
- team Former teams: Free agent New Jersey Devils; Anaheim Ducks; Pittsburgh Penguins; SKA Saint Petersburg
- NHL draft: 162nd overall, 2012; Colorado Avalanche
- Playing career: 2015–present

Joseph Blandisi (born July 18, 1994) is a Canadian professional ice hockey forward who is currently an unrestricted free agent. He most recently played for SKA Saint Petersburg of the Kontinental Hockey League (KHL). He was selected in the sixth round, 162nd overall, by the Colorado Avalanche of the National Hockey League (NHL) in the 2012 NHL entry draft and has previously played for the New Jersey Devils, Anaheim Ducks, and Pittsburgh Penguins.

== Playing career ==
=== Junior ===
After playing in the Ontario Junior Hockey League with the Vaughan Vipers, Blandisi was selected by the Owen Sound Attack of the Ontario Hockey League (OHL) 61st overall in the 2011 OHL Priority Selection draft. Upon completing his rookie season with the Attack, Blandisi was drafted in the sixth round, 162nd overall, by the Colorado Avalanche of the National Hockey League (NHL) in the 2012 NHL entry draft. In his sophomore season in 2012–13, Blandisi was traded by the Owen Sound Attack to the Ottawa 67's in exchange for Cody Ceci on January 7, 2013. Despite lacking in height, Blandisi possessed a solid frame and improved upon his rookie season with 51 points in 63 games.

Blandisi's tenure in Ottawa was limited to exactly a year, for in the 2013–14 season on January 8, 2014, he was dealt by the rebuilding 67's to the Barrie Colts. Limited to just 47 games again due to injury, Blandisi still improved to a point-per-game scoring rate. In the off-season, Blandisi was not offered a contract by the Colorado Avalanche and was re-entered into the 2014 NHL entry draft, in which he was passed over.

In preparation for the 2014–15 season, Blandisi attended the NHL's Buffalo Sabres's training camp by invitation on September 13, 2014. At the conclusion of camp he was returned to the Colts without a contract. Amongst the leadership group with the Colts, Blandisi was later named captain on November 19. He broke out offensively in his overage season and was leading the club in scoring when he was signed to a three-year entry-level contract with the New Jersey Devils of the NHL on January 14, 2015. He finished the season leading the OHL in goal scoring with 52 markers in 68 games and placing fourth in overall scoring with 112 points. Upon the club's second-round exit in the post-season, Blandisi was award the Leo Lalonde Memorial Trophy as the OHL's overage player of the year. He placed second in voting for the OHL's most outstanding player award, the Red Tilson Trophy, only to star phenomenon Connor McDavid.

=== Professional ===
After attending his first New Jersey Devils training camp, Blandisi was assigned to begin his professional career in the 2015–16 season with American Hockey League (AHL) affiliate, the Albany Devils on September 27, 2015. Blandisi made a quick transition to the pro level, maintaining a scoring presence on Albany's top line with 16 points in 18 games before he received his first recall to the NHL by New Jersey on December 10, 2015. Centering a line between Kyle Palmieri and Jiří Tlustý, he made a successful NHL debut with the Devils in a 3–2 overtime victory against the Detroit Red Wings on December 11, 2015. He recorded his first NHL point, an assist, on a Lee Stempniak goal on January 12, 2016. On January 21, 2016, in a game against the Ottawa Senators, Blandisi netted his first NHL goal against Craig Anderson, and also had two assists as part of a three-point first period that ended with a 5–0 Devils lead, their largest scoring output for a single period of the season.

Blandisi began the 2017–18 season, assigned to New Jersey's new AHL affiliate, the Binghamton Devils. He collected 14 points in 19 games before the Devils traded Blandisi on November 30, 2017 along with Adam Henrique and a third-round draft pick in 2018 to the Anaheim Ducks for Sami Vatanen and a conditional draft pick in 2019 or 2020.

In the 2018–19 season, Blandisi began with the San Diego Gulls of the AHL before he was called up to the Ducks to feature in three scoreless games. After his return to the Gulls, Blandisi registered 23 points in 27 games, before he was traded by the Ducks to the Pittsburgh Penguins in exchange for Derek Grant on January 16, 2019.

In the 2019–20 season, Blandisi played 21 games in the NHL with the Pittsburgh Penguins, registering 5 points (2 goals, 3 assists). On February 20, 2020 Blandisi was traded by the Penguins, along with Jake Lucchini to the Montreal Canadiens in exchange for Riley Barber and Phil Varone. At the end of the season, Blandisi underwent knee surgery.

As an un-signed free agent leading into the 2021–22 season, on December 14, 2021, Blandisi signed a professional tryout contract with the Toronto Marlies of the AHL, the primary affiliate of the Toronto Maple Leafs. On July 10, 2023, Blandisi agreed to extend his tenure with the Marlies, signing a one-year contract for the 2023–24 season, his third with the club.

Blandisi played with the Marlies for four seasons before leaving North America as a free agent to sign a two-year contract with Russian club, SKA Saint Petersburg of the KHL, on August 12, 2025.

== Career statistics ==
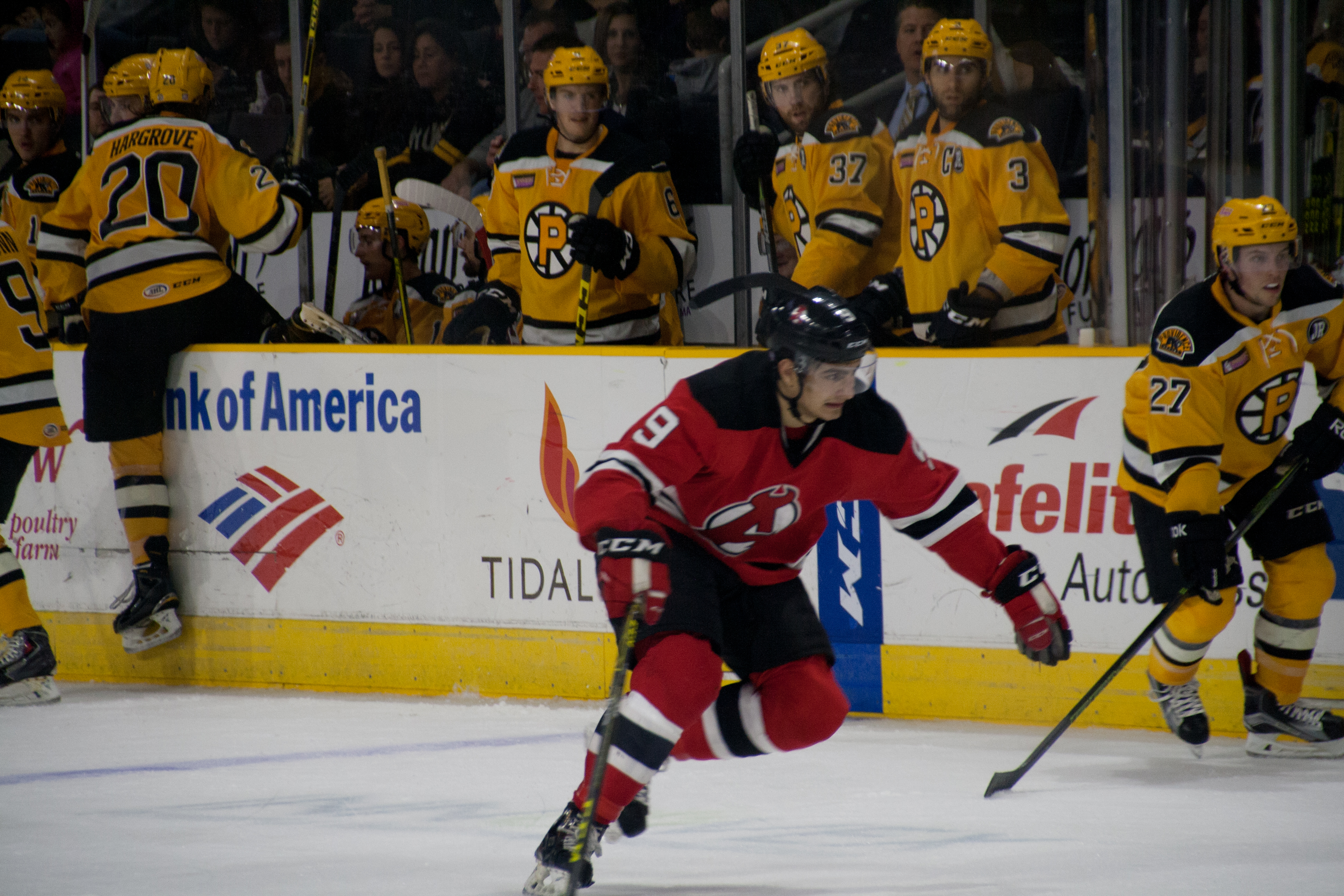
Blandisi during his tenure with the Albany Devils.

			Regular season					Playoffs
Season	Team	League	GP	G	A	Pts	PIM	GP	G	A	Pts	PIM
2010–11	Vaughan Vipers	OJHL	7	2	0	2	14	—	—	—	—	—
2011–12	Owen Sound Attack	OHL	68	17	14	31	72	5	0	1	1	8
2012–13	Owen Sound Attack	OHL	37	7	18	25	49	—	—	—	—	—
2012–13	Ottawa 67's	OHL	26	8	18	26	68	—	—	—	—	—
2013–14	Ottawa 67's	OHL	37	21	16	37	57	—	—	—	—	—
2013–14	Barrie Colts	OHL	10	3	10	13	16	—	—	—	—	—
2014–15	Barrie Colts	OHL	68	52	60	112	126	9	6	8	14	22
2015–16	Albany Devils	AHL	27	9	14	23	49	11	2	1	3	14
2015–16	New Jersey Devils	NHL	41	5	12	17	34	—	—	—	—	—
2016–17	Albany Devils	AHL	31	8	17	25	60	2	0	0	0	6
2016–17	New Jersey Devils	NHL	27	3	6	9	26	—	—	—	—	—
2017–18	Binghamton Devils	AHL	19	3	11	14	24	—	—	—	—	—
2017–18	Anaheim Ducks	NHL	3	0	0	0	2	—	—	—	—	—
2017–18	San Diego Gulls	AHL	27	5	10	15	40	—	—	—	—	—
2018–19	San Diego Gulls	AHL	27	8	15	23	42	—	—	—	—	—
2018–19	Anaheim Ducks	NHL	3	0	0	0	6	—	—	—	—	—
2018–19	Pittsburgh Penguins	NHL	6	0	0	0	0	—	—	—	—	—
2018–19	Wilkes-Barre/Scranton Penguins	AHL	27	9	11	20	58	—	—	—	—	—
2019–20	Wilkes-Barre/Scranton Penguins	AHL	26	6	8	14	57	—	—	—	—	—
2019–20	Pittsburgh Penguins	NHL	21	2	3	5	10	—	—	—	—	—
2019–20	Laval Rocket	AHL	4	1	3	4	4	—	—	—	—	—
2020–21	Laval Rocket	AHL	28	10	11	21	34	—	—	—	—	—
2021–22	Toronto Marlies	AHL	43	12	17	29	48	—	—	—	—	—
2022–23	Toronto Marlies	AHL	61	15	24	39	56	7	2	5	7	22
2023–24	Toronto Marlies	AHL	70	25	34	59	110	3	1	2	3	0
2024–25	Toronto Marlies	AHL	58	15	20	35	82	2	0	0	0	6
2025–26	SKA Saint Petersburg	KHL	62	12	17	29	56	4	2	0	2	4
NHL totals			101	10	21	31	78	—	—	—	—	—
KHL totals			62	12	17	29	56	4	2	0	2	4

== Awards and honours ==
Award	Year
OHL
Third All-Star Team	2015
