= Pete Wright (ice hockey) =

Canadian ice hockey player

- Born: January 25, 1927 Grande Prairie, Alberta, Canada
- Died: August 19, 1989 (aged 62) Grande Prairie, Alberta, Canada
- Height: 6 ft 1 in (185 cm)
- Weight: 200 lb (91 kg; 14 st 4 lb)
- Position: Defenseman
- Shot: Left
- Played for: Edmonton Mercurys
- National team: Canada
- Playing career: 1947–1960
Medal record
Men's ice hockey
Gold medal – first place	1950 London	Ice hockey

Peter Donald Wright (January 25, 1927 – August 19, 1989), was a Canadian ice hockey player with the Edmonton Mercurys.

== Career ==
Wright won a gold medal at the 1950 World Ice Hockey Championships in London, England. The 1950 Edmonton Mercurys team was inducted to the Alberta Sports Hall of Fame in 2011.

Wright later played with the Sherbrooke Saints in the QMHL, Buffalo Bisons in the AHL, as well as the Edmonton Flyers, Seattle Americans, New Westminster Royals, and Victoria Cougars in the WHL.
