= Ab Newsome =

Canadian ice hockey player

- Born: April 8, 1920 Strathcona, Alberta, Canada
- Died: May 17, 1979 (aged 59) Edmonton, Alberta, Canada
- Position: Centre
- Played for: Edmonton Mercurys
- National team: Canada
- Playing career: 1948–1963
Medal record
Men's ice hockey
Gold medal – first place	1950 London	Ice hockey

Albert Victor Newsome (April 8, 1920 – May 17, 1979) was a Canadian ice hockey player with the Edmonton Mercurys. He won a gold medal at the 1950 World Ice Hockey Championships in London, England. The 1950 Edmonton Mercurys team was inducted to the Alberta Sports Hall of Fame in 2011. He also played with the Edmonton Flyers and Edmonton Maple Leafs.
