= Don Stanley (engineer) =

Canadian ice hockey player, businessman (1917–2001)

- Born: October 18, 1917 Edmonton, Alberta, Canada
- Died: September 21, 2001 (aged 83) Edmonton, Alberta, Canada
- Height: 6 ft 2 in (188 cm)
- Weight: 200 lb (91 kg; 14 st 4 lb)
- Position: Left wing
- Shot: Left
- Played for: Edmonton Mercurys
- National team: Canada
- Playing career: 1935–1950
Medal record
Men's ice hockey
Gold medal – first place	1950 London	Ice hockey

Donald Russell Stanley (October 18, 1917 – September 21, 2001) was a Canadian ice hockey player with the Edmonton Mercurys. He won a gold medal at the 1950 World Ice Hockey Championships in London, England. The 1950 Edmonton Mercurys team was inducted to the Alberta Sports Hall of Fame in 2011. He also played with the Edmonton Flyers, University of Alberta Golden Bears and RCAF Station Dartmouth hockey teams.

Stanley later attended Harvard University where he earned master's and doctorate degrees in environmental engineering. He founded Stanley Associates Engineering in 1954, which later became Stantec. In 1998, he was inducted to the Alberta Order of Excellence, recognizing the breadth of his contributions to the people of Alberta.
