= Don Stanley (footballer) =

Australian rules footballer (1945–2018)

Personal information
- Full name: Don Stanley
- Born: 16 April 1945
- Died: 11 November 2018 (aged 73)
- Original team: South Melbourne Tech
- Height: 178 cm (5 ft 10 in)
- Weight: 76 kg (168 lb)

Playing career^{1}
Years	Club	Games (Goals)
1964	South Melbourne	4 (0)
- ^{1} Playing statistics correct to the end of 1964.

Don Stanley (16 April 1945 – 11 November 2018) was an Australian rules footballer who played with South Melbourne in the Victorian Football League (VFL).
