= Dave Rochefort =

Canadian ice hockey player (born 1946)

- Born: July 22, 1946 (age 78); Red Deer, Alberta, Canada
- Height: 6 ft 0 in (183 cm)
- Weight: 180 lb (82 kg; 12 st 12 lb)
- Position: Centre
- Shot: Left
- Played for: Detroit Red Wings
- Playing career: 1966–1972

David Joseph Rochefort (born July 22, 1946) is a Canadian former professional ice hockey center who appeared in one National Hockey League game for the Detroit Red Wings during the 1966–67 season, on March 28, 1967 against the Chicago Black Hawks. The rest of his career, which lasted from 1966 to 1972, was spent in different minor leagues.

== Career statistics ==
=== Regular season and playoffs ===
			Regular season					Playoffs
Season	Team	League	GP	G	A	Pts	PIM	GP	G	A	Pts	PIM
1962–63	Edmonton Oil Kings	CAHL	—	—	—	—	—	—	—	—	—	—
1962–63	Edmonton Oil Kings	M-Cup	—	—	—	—	—	11	0	1	1	4
1963–64	Edmonton Oil Kings	CAHL	6	3	5	8	21	—	—	—	—	—
1964–65	Edmonton Oil Kings	ASHL	—	—	—	—	—	5	2	2	4	0
1964–65	Edmonton Oil Kings	M-Cup	—	—	—	—	—	18	6	2	8	26
1965–66	Edmonton Oil Kings	ASHL	24	6	10	16	34	11	3	7	10	18
1965–66	Edmonton Oil Kings	M-Cup	—	—	—	—	—	19	7	9	16	39
1966–67	Detroit Red Wings	NHL	1	0	0	0	0	—	—	—	—	—
1966–67	Memphis Wings	CHL	32	5	8	13	10	—	—	—	—	—
1966–67	Pittsburgh Hornets	AHL	1	0	0	0	0	—	—	—	—	—
1967–68	Fort Worth Wings	CHL	65	15	18	33	55	12	2	0	2	16
1968–69	Baltimore Clippers	AHL	46	2	7	9	22	—	—	—	—	—
1969–70	Oklahoma City Blazers	CHL	3	0	1	1	2	—	—	—	—	—
1969–70	Salt Lake Golden Eagles	WHL	59	7	16	23	40	—	—	—	—	—
1970–71	Edmonton Monarchs	ASHL	—	—	—	—	—	—	—	—	—	—
1971–72	Edmonton Monarchs	PrSHL	30	29	24	53	43	—	—	—	—	—
CHL totals			100	20	27	47	67	12	2	0	2	16
NHL totals			1	0	0	0	0	—	—	—	—	—

== See also ==
- List of players who played only one game in the NHL
