= Lethbridge Maple Leafs =

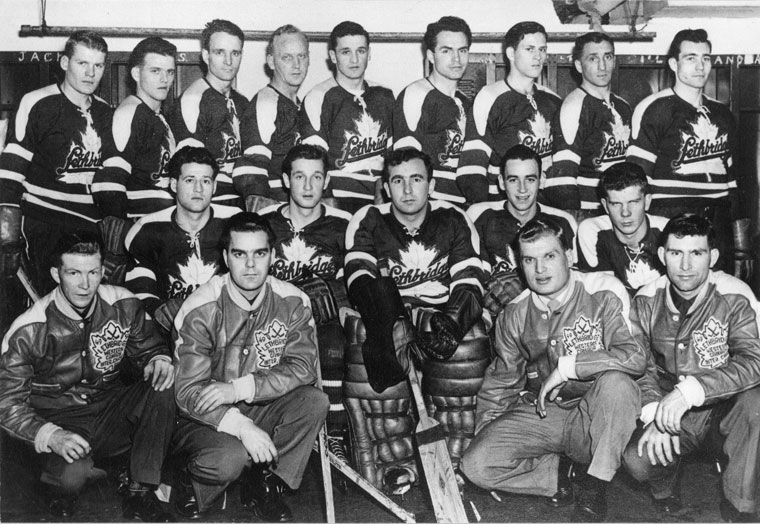
Lethbridge Maple Leafs Hockey Club

The Lethbridge Maple Leafs were, at times, a senior, intermediate, and junior ice hockey team in Lethbridge, Alberta. They are best known for winning the 1951 World Ice Hockey Championships.

The Maple Leafs were a men's senior ice hockey team from Lethbridge, Alberta formed in 1936, playing in the Alberta Senior Hockey League. After World War II, the Maple Leafs played in the Western Canada Senior Hockey League. In 1950, they captured the Western Canadian Championship. The Maple Leafs were selected to represent Canada at the 1951 World Championships in Paris, France. Coached by Dick Gray, the Maple Leafs won the gold medal, beforehand they had been months long on a European tour that included the first Sir Winston Churchill Cup Competition, in which the Leafs won the gold medal. During their European tour, they played 62 games winning 51, tying 4, and losing 7 of them. The team's tour was overseen by Frank Sargent, a past-president of the Canadian Amateur Hockey Association. He stated the Lethbridge Maple Leafs were the best goodwill ambassadors the Canada could have had, describing them as gentlemanly and well-behaved.

The 1951 Lethbridge Maple Leafs team was inducted to the Alberta Sports Hall of Fame in 1974.

== Senior team ==
=== West Kootenay League (1937-38) ===
1937-38: 2nd in East, lost semi-final

=== Alberta Senior Hockey League (1938-42) ===
1938-39: 1st, won final, lost West Semi-Final 1939-40: 2nd, lost semi-final 1940-41: 1st, won final, lost West Final 1941-42: 2nd, won final, lost West Semi-Final

=== Western Canada Senior Hockey League (1946-49) ===
1946-47: 3rd, lost final 1947-48: 4th, lost semi-final 1948-49: 4th, lost semi-final

== Intermediate team ==
The Maple Leafs won the provincial titles in 1936-37 and 1949–50, In both these years they won the Western Canada title as well.

Their 1949-50 title led to them being chosen as Canada's representative in the 1951 World Ice Hockey Championships. Prior to that competition they went on a European tour. They then won the World Championship. The team continued to compete into the late 1950s.

=== 1951 World Championship roster ===
- Ken Branch
- Bill Chandler
- Dinny Flanagan
- Bill Flick
- Bill Gibson
- Dick Gray (Coach)
- Mallie Hughes
- Bert Knibbs
- Jim Malacko
- Robert McGregor
- Don McLean
- Nap Milroy
- Hector Negrello
- Stan Obodiac
- Walter Rimstad
- Mickey Roth
- Lou Siray
- Carl Sorokoski
- Jack Sumner
- Don Vogan
- Tom Wood

== NHL alumni ==
Thirteen alumni of the Lethbridge Maple Leafs also played in the National Hockey League.

- Viv Allen
- Garth Boesch
- Jack Evans
- Joe Fisher
- Bing Juckes
- Alex Kaleta
- Bob Kirkpatrick
- Odie Lowe
- Jake Milford
- Tony Savage
- Sweeney Schriner
- Peter Slobodian
- Ken Stewart

== See also ==
- Alberta-British Columbia Senior League
