= Traffic Design Group =

Consultancy in New Zealand

Traffic Design Group (TDG) was a consultancy in New Zealand. The largest specialist traffic engineering and transport planning consultancy in the country, they had offices in Auckland, Tauranga, Hamilton, Hawke's Bay, Wellington, Nelson, Christchurch and Queenstown and are nationally recognised in their field.

The company has been active in the New Zealand transport sector since 1976.

TDG was acquired by Stantec in 2018.

== Scope and projects ==
TDG has provided consulting services on various large projects, including examples such as wind farms, event locations like SkyCity Auckland casino or Stadium New Zealand (where they assessed the traffic and parking effects of providing a major new 60,000 seat stadium on the Auckland waterfront, and which they supported as a viable location in terms of traffic). TDG has also planned the pedestrian elements of the Westpac Stadium in Wellington.

Other projects the company has worked on include traffic modelling such as for NZ Transport Agency , and research reports for government entities, such as 'The Ins and Outs of Roundabouts', a safety audit of roundabout research. Another field the company is very active in is traffic survey work, having, for example, long produced the traffic volume reports of the New Zealand state highway network for Transit New Zealand (now NZ Transport Agency), and having been contracted by Christchurch City Council and also Waikato Local Authority Shared Services to gather interview traffic data from more than 25,000 drivers in the Christchurch and Waikato areas, to inform future traffic planning [models].

The company also advises on construction and event traffic management, such as for the APEC and V8 Supercars events.
