= 1950 Ice Hockey World Championships =

1950 edition of the World Ice Hockey Championships

Tournament details
- Host country: United Kingdom
- Venue(s): Wembley Arena, Empress Hall and Harringay (in 1 host city)
- Dates: 13–22 March
- Teams: 9

Final positions
- Champions: Canada (13th title)
- Runners-up: United States
- Third place: Switzerland
- Fourth place: Great Britain

Tournament statistics
- Games played: 27
- Goals scored: 302 (11.19 per game)
- Attendance: 127,700 (4,730 per game)

The 1950 Ice Hockey World Championships, were the 17th World Championships and 28th European Championships were held from 13 to 22 March 1950 in London, England. Canada, represented by the Edmonton Mercurys, won its 13th World Championship. Highest ranking European team Switzerland finished third, winning its fourth European Championship. Defending World and European champion Czechoslovakia was absent from the tournament.

== History and political issues ==
Officially, the defending champion Czechoslovaks did not arrive in London because two of their journalists did not receive their visas. In reality, communist authorities had become uneasy after the LTC Praha (LTC Prague) club team had suffered defections at the 1948 Spengler Cup in Davos, the death of six national team players in a plane crash a few months before the 1949 World Ice Hockey Championships, and the defection of former national hockey team player (and future Wimbledon tennis champion) Jaroslav Drobný in June 1949. The authorities arrested several members of the 1950 national team while they were awaiting their delayed flight at the Prague Airport. On 7 October 1950, the players appeared in court charged with espionage and were named "state traitors." At issue was the claim that several players on the 1950 national team, who played their club hockey with LTC Praha, had discussed defecting in Davos in 1948—though only Miroslav Sláma, two other players and one of the heads of the delegation had actually defected at that Spengler Cup tournament. All twelve men were convicted, with sentences ranging from eight months to 15 years. Then current LTC Praha and former national team goaltender Bohumil Modrý, a delegate with the 1950 national team, was the one to receive the 15 year sentence, as he was mysteriously cast as the "main figure" in the potential defection plan.

Despite the politics, International Ice Hockey Federation president W. G. Hardy stressed that the event was "to promote international amity". Hardy credited the Sweden men's national ice hockey team for great improvements reflecting the growth of the game in Sweden.

== World Hockey Championships (in London, England) ==
In a format similar to the 1949 championships, in the initial round, the nine teams participating were divided into three groups with three teams each. In the second round, the top two teams in each group advanced to the medal pool (for positions 1 through 6) with the remaining three teams advancing to the consolation pool for places 7 through 9.

=== First Round ===
==== Group A ====
13 March 1950	London	Great Britain	–	France	9:0 (4:0,3:0,2:0)
14 March 1950	London	Norway	–	France	11:0 (7:0,2:0,2:0)
15 March 1950	London	Great Britain	–	Norway	2:0 (0:0,0:0,2:0)

Standings

Pos.	Team	G.P	Wins	Ties	Losses	Goals	Goal diff.	Pts.
1	Great Britain	2	2	0	0	11: 0	+11	4:0
2	Norway	2	1	0	1	11: 2	+ 9	2:2
3	France	2	0	0	2	0:20	-20	0:4

==== Group B ====
13 March 1950	London	Switzerland	–	Belgium	24:3 (5:1,7:1,12:1)
14 March 1950	London	Canada	–	Switzerland	13:2 (5:1,4:1,4:0)
15 March 1950	London	Canada	–	Belgium	33:0 (14:0,10:0,9:0)

Standings

Pos.	Team	G.P	Wins	Ties	Losses	Goals	Goal diff.	Pts.
1	Canada	2	2	0	0	46: 2	+44	4:0
2	Switzerland	2	1	0	1	26:16	+10	2:2
3	Belgium	2	0	0	2	3:57	-54	0:4

==== Group C ====
13 March 1950	London	Sweden	–	USA	8:3 (5:2,0:0,3:1)
14 March 1950	London	Sweden	–	Netherlands	10:0 (3:0,1:0,6:0)
15 March 1950	London	USA	–	Netherlands	17:1 (7:0,2:0,8:1)

Standings

Pos.	Team	G.P	Wins	Ties	Losses	Goals	Goal diff.	Pts.
1	Sweden	2	2	0	0	18: 3	+15	4:0
2	USA	2	1	0	1	20: 9	+11	2:2
3	Netherlands	2	0	0	2	1:27	-26	0:4

==== Consolation round – places 7 to 9 ====
20 March 1950	London	Belgium	–	France	8:1 (3:0,2:0,3:1)
21 March 1950	London	Netherlands	–	France	4:2 (1:0,3:1,0:1)
22 March 1950	London	Belgium	–	Netherlands	4:2 (2:1,1:0,1:1)

Standings

Pos.	Team	G.P	Wins	Ties	Losses	Goals	Goal diff.	Pts.
7	Belgium	2	2	0	0	12: 3	+ 9	4:0
8	Netherlands	2	1	0	1	6: 6	0	2:2
9	France	2	0	0	2	3:12	9	0:4

==== Final Round – places 1 to 6 ====
17 March 1950	London	Great Britain	–	Norway	4:3 (1:0,2:2,1:1)
17 March 1950	London	Canada	–	Switzerland	11:1 (2:0,3:1,6:0)
17 March 1950	London	Sweden	–	USA	2:4 (1:0,1:2,0:2)
18 March 1950	London	Switzerland	–	Norway	12:4 (3:3,6:0,3:1)
18 March 1950	London	Canada	–	USA	5:0 (0:0,1:0,4:0)
18 March 1950	London	Great Britain	–	Sweden	5:4 (0:0,1:2,4:2)
20 March 1950	London	Great Britain	–	USA	2:3 (2:1,0:0,0:2)
20 March 1950	London	Canada	–	Norway	11:1 (3:0,4:1,4:0)
20 March 1950	London	Sweden	–	Switzerland	2:3 (2:1,0:0,0:2)
21 March 1950	London	USA	–	Switzerland	10:5 (3:0,1:3,6:2)
21 March 1950	London	Sweden	–	Norway	6:1 (2:0,3:0,1:1)
21 March 1950	London	Great Britain	–	Canada	0:12 (0:5,0:3,0:4)
22 March 1950	London	USA	–	Norway	12:6 (5:0,4:3,3:3)
22 March 1950	London	Great Britain	–	Switzerland	3:10 (1:4,2:3,0:3)
22 March 1950	London	Canada	–	Sweden	3:1 (1:0,2:0,0:1)

Standings

Pos.	Team	G.P	Wins	Ties	Losses	Goals	Goal diff.	Pts.
1	Canada	5	5	0	0	42: 3	+39	10: 0
2	USA	5	4	0	1	29:20	+ 9	8: 2
3	Switzerland	5	3	0	2	31:30	+ 1	6: 4
4	Great Britain	5	2	0	3	14:32	-18	4: 6
5	Sweden	5	1	0	4	15:16	1	2: 8
6	Norway	5	0	0	5	15:45	-30	0:10

=== Final rankings – World Championship ===
Pos.	Team
1	Canada
2	USA
3	Switzerland
4	Great Britain
5	Sweden
6	Norway
7	Belgium
8	Netherlands
9	France

World Champion 1950
Canada

==== Team members ====
Edmonton Mercurys

Pos.	Country	Members
1	CAN	Leo Lucchini, Hassie Young, Ab Newsome, Billy Dawe, Harry Allen, Doug Macauley, Don Stanley, Bob Watt, Marsh Darling, Al Purvis, John Davies, Jimmy Kilburn, Pete Wright, Don Gauf, Robert David, Jack Manson, Wilbur Delaney; Trainer: Jimmy Graham

=== Final rankings – European Championships ===
Pos.	Team
1	Switzerland
2	Great Britain
3	Sweden
4	Norway
5	Belgium
6	Netherlands
7	France

European Champions 1950
Switzerland
