= 1951 Ice Hockey World Championships =

1951 edition of the World Ice Hockey Championships

Tournament details
- Host country: France
- Venue: Palais des Sports
- Dates: 9–17 March
- Teams: 7

Final positions
- Champions: Canada (14th title)
- Runners-up: Sweden
- Third place: Switzerland
- Fourth place: Norway

Tournament statistics
- Games played: 21
- Goals scored: 180 (8.57 per game)
- Scoring leader: (Canada) Stan Obodiac (10 goals)

The 1951 Ice Hockey World Championships was the 18th World Championship and the 29th European Championship in ice hockey for international teams. The tournament took place in France from 9 to 17 March and the games were played in the capital city, Paris. Thirteen nations took part, and were first split into two groups. The seven best teams were placed in the first group, and the six others were placed into the "Criterium Européen", which would later become the B Pool. Each group was played in a round robin format, with each team playing each other once.

Canada, represented by the Lethbridge Maple Leafs, became world champions for the 14th time. Highest ranking European team Sweden finished second, winning their fifth European Championship, finishing ahead of the Swiss on goal differential by three.

This tournament would be the last time France hosted the elite division of the World Championships until 2017, when Paris co-hosted the championship alongside Cologne in Germany.

== World Championship Group A (France) ==
Date	Games	Result	Periods
9 March	Norway vs. United States	3–0	0–0, 1–0, 2–0
10 March	Canada vs. Finland	11–1	4–0, 4–0, 3–1
10 March	Sweden vs. Great Britain	5–1	0–1, 1–0, 4–0
10 March	Switzerland vs. Norway	8–1	4–1, 3–0, 1–0
11 March	Sweden vs. United States	8–0	4–0, 1–0, 3–0
11 March	Canada vs. Norway	8–0	3–0, 1–0, 4–0
12 March	United States vs. Finland	5–4	1–0, 1–3, 3–1
12 March	Switzerland vs. Great Britain	7–1	2–0, 4–1, 1–0
13 March	Sweden vs. Norway	5–2	1–0, 4–1, 0–1
13 March	Switzerland vs. Finland	4–1	1–0, 2–1, 1–0
13 March	Canada vs. Great Britain	17–1	0–1, 7–0, 10–0
14 March	Switzerland vs. Sweden	3–3	1–2, 1–1, 1–0
15 March	Norway vs. Great Britain	4–3	0–0, 1–2, 3–1
15 March	Sweden vs. Finland	11–3	5–0, 1–1, 5–2
15 March	Canada – United States	16–2	5–0, 6–2, 5–0
16 March	Norway vs. Finland	0–3	0–1, 0–0, 0–2
16 March	Canada vs. Switzerland	5–1	0–1, 3–0, 2–0
16 March	United States vs. Great Britain	6–6	1–4, 2–1, 3–1
17 March	Finland vs. Great Britain	3–6	0–2, 3–0, 0–4
17 March	Switzerland vs. United States	5–1	3–0, 1–1, 1–0
17 March	Canada vs. Sweden	5–1	1–0, 2–0, 2–1

=== Table ===
Pos	Team	Pld	W	D	L	GF	GA	GD	Pts
1	Canada	6	6	0	0	62	6	+56	12
2	Sweden	6	4	1	1	33	14	+19	9
3	Switzerland	6	4	1	1	28	12	+16	9
4	Norway	6	2	0	4	10	27	−17	4
5	Great Britain	6	1	1	4	18	42	−24	3
6	United States	6	1	1	4	14	42	−28	3
7	Finland	6	1	0	5	15	37	−22	2

== Critérium européen – Junior European Championship (World Championship Group B) (France) ==
Date	Games	Result	Periods
10 March	France vs. Italy	1–4	0–1, 0–2, 1–1
11 March	Netherlands vs. Italy	1–3	1–0, 0–2, 0–1
11 March	France vs. Austria	7–3	1–0, 1–0, 5–3
11 March	Yugoslavia vs. Belgium	3–13	0–5, 0–3, 3–5
12 March	Austria vs. Belgium	5–3	0–1, 3–1, 2–1
12 March	Netherlands vs. Yugoslavia	5–2	0–0, 4–1, 1–1
13 March	Belgium vs. Italy	3–7	1–0, 0–2, 2–5
14 March	France vs. Yugoslavia	10–3	3–2, 3–1, 4–0
14 March	Austria vs. Netherlands	3–4	1–1, 1–2, 1–1
15 March	Italy vs. Yugoslavia	6–1	1–0, 4–1, 1–0
15 March	France vs. Belgium	10–0	2–0, 3–0, 5–0
16 March	Belgium vs. Netherlands	1–2	0–2, 1–0, 0–0
16 March	Austria vs. Italy	2–7	1–1, 0–3, 1–3
17 March	Austria vs. Yugoslavia	3–4	1–1, 1–0, 1–3
17 March	France vs. Netherlands	7–5	1–2, 3–1, 3–2

=== Table ===
Pos	Team	Pld	W	D	L	GF	GA	GD	Pts
8	Italy	5	5	0	0	26	8	+18	10
9	France	5	4	0	1	35	15	+20	8
10	Netherlands	5	3	0	2	17	16	+1	6
11	Austria	5	1	0	4	20	25	−5	2
12	Belgium	5	1	0	4	20	30	−10	2
13	Yugoslavia	5	1	0	4	13	37	−24	2

== World Championship medals ==
1951 World Championship	Country
Gold	Canada
Silver	Sweden
Bronze	Switzerland
4	Norway
5	Great Britain
6	United States
7	Finland

== European Championship medals ==
1951 European Championship	Country
Gold	Sweden
Silver	Switzerland
Bronze	Norway
4	Great Britain
5	Finland
