= Ice hockey at the 1932 Winter Olympics – Rosters =

The ice hockey team rosters at the 1932 Winter Olympics consisted of the following players. Forty-eight players from four nations competed.

== Canada ==
Head coach: Jack Hughes

Pos.	Name	Birthdate	Team
G	William Cockburn (C)	March 1, 1902 (aged 29)	(Canada) Winnipeg Hockey Club
F	Clifford Crowley	June 13, 1906 (aged 25)	(Canada) Winnipeg Hockey Club
F	Albert Duncanson	October 2, 1911 (aged 20)	(Canada) Winnipeg Hockey Club
F	George Garbutt	June 18, 1903 (aged 28)	(Canada) Winnipeg Hockey Club
D	Roy Henkel	August 22, 1905 (aged 26)	(Canada) Winnipeg Hockey Club
F	Vic Lundquist	March 22, 1908 (aged 23)	(Canada) Winnipeg Hockey Club
F	Norman Malloy	July 28, 1905 (aged 26)	(Canada) Winnipeg Hockey Club
F	Walter Monson	November 29, 1908 (aged 23)	(Canada) Winnipeg Hockey Club
F	Kenneth Moore	February 17, 1910 (aged 21)	(Canada) Winnipeg Hockey Club
F	Romeo Rivers	March 28, 1907 (aged 24)	(Canada) Winnipeg Hockey Club
F	Harold "Hack" Simpson	June 26, 1910 (aged 21)	(Canada) Winnipeg Hockey Club
D	Hugh Sutherland	February 2, 1907 (aged 25)	(Canada) Winnipeg Hockey Club
G	Stanley Wagner	March 2, 1908 (aged 23)	(Canada) Winnipeg Hockey Club
F	Alton Wise	October 29, 1904 (aged 27)	(Canada) Winnipeg Hockey Club

== Germany ==
Head coach: Erich Römer

Pos.	Name	Birthdate	Team
F	Rudi Ball	June 22, 1911 (aged 20)	(Germany) Berliner Schlittschuh-Club
D/F	Alfred Heinrich	February 21, 1906 (aged 25)	(Germany) SC Brandenburg Berlin
F	Erich Herker	September 25, 1905 (aged 26)	(Germany) SC Brandenburg Berlin
F	Gustav Jaenecke (C)	May 22, 1908 (aged 23)	(Germany) Berliner Schlittschuh-Club
F	Werner Korff	December 18, 1911 (aged 20)	(Germany) Berliner Schlittschuh-Club
G	Walter Leinweber	April 18, 1907 (aged 24)	(Germany) EV Füssen
D/F	Erich Römer	June 2, 1894 (aged 37)	(Germany) Berliner Schlittschuh-Club
F	Martin Schröttle	September 1, 1901 (aged 30)	(Germany) SC Riessersee
F	Marquardt Slevogt	March 22, 1909 (aged 22)	(Germany) SC Riessersee
F	Georg Strobl	February 9, 1910 (aged 21)	(Germany) SC Riessersee

== Poland ==
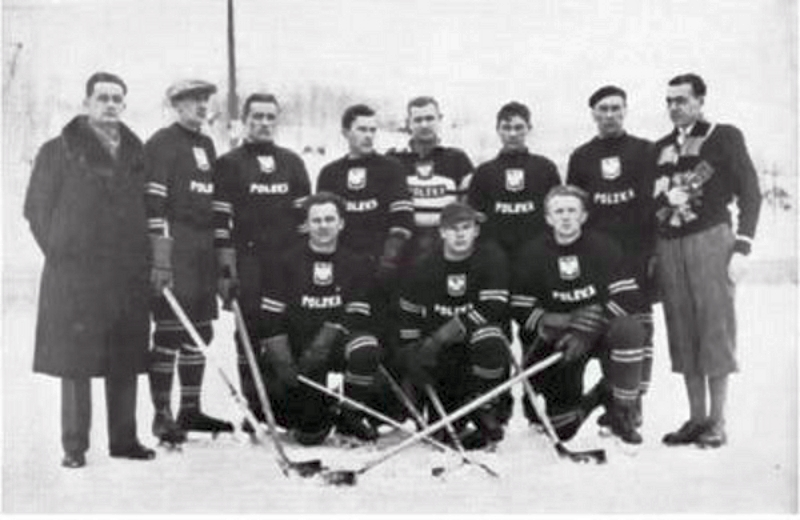
The Polish national team during the Olympics.

Head coach: Tadeusz Sachs

Pos.	Name	Birthdate	Team
F	Adam Kowalski	December 19, 1912 (aged 19)	(Poland) Cracovia Krakow
D/F	Aleksander Kowalski	October 7, 1902 (aged 29)	(Poland) AZS Warszawa
F	Włodzimierz Krygier (C)	January 29, 1900 (aged 32)	(Poland) Polonia Warszawa
D/F	Witalis Ludwiczak	April 20, 1910 (aged 21)	(Poland) AZS Poznan
F	Czesław Marchewczyk	October 1, 1912 (aged 19)	(Poland) Cracovia Krakow
F/D	Kazimierz Materski	September 23, 1906 (aged 25)	(Poland) Legia Warszawa
D	Albert Mauer	February 12, 1907 (aged 24)	(Poland) Pogon Lwów
F	Roman Sabiński	December 28, 1908 (aged 23)	(Poland) Pogon Lwów
D	Kazimierz Sokołowski	March 26, 1908 (aged 23)	(Poland) Lechia Lwów
G	Józef Stogowski	November 27, 1899 (aged 32)	(Poland) TKS Toruń

== United States ==
Head coach: Alfred Winsor

Pos.	Name	Birthdate	Team
F/D	Osborne Anderson	October 15, 1908 (aged 23)	(United States) Boston Hockey Club
F/D	Johnny Bent	August 5, 1908 (aged 23)	N/A
F	John Chase	June 12, 1906 (aged 25)	N/A
F	John Cookman	September 2, 1909 (aged 22)	N/A
F	Douglas Everett	April 3, 1905 (aged 26)	N/A
G	Frank Farrell	March 23, 1908 (aged 23)	N/A
F	Joe Fitzgerald	October 10, 1904 (aged 27)	N/A
G	Ted Frazier	January 21, 1907 (aged 25)	N/A
D/F	John Garrison	February 13, 1909 (aged 22)	N/A
D	Buzz Hallock	June 4, 1905 (aged 26)	N/A
D	Robert Livingston	November 3, 1908 (aged 23)	N/A
F	Francis Nelson	January 24, 1910 (aged 22)	N/A
F	Winthrop Palmer	December 5, 1906 (aged 25)	N/A
F	Gordon Smith	February 14, 1908 (aged 23)	N/A

== Sources ==
- Duplacey, James (1998). Total Hockey: The official encyclopedia of the National Hockey League. Total Sports. ISBN 0-8362-7114-9.
- Podnieks, Andrew (2010). IIHF Media Guide & Record Book 2011. Moydart Pres.
- Hockey Hall Of Fame page on the 1932 Olympics
- Wallechinsky, David (1988). The Complete Book of the Olympics. Penguin Books. pp. 614. ISBN 0-14-010771-1.
