= List of Olympic medalists in ice hockey =

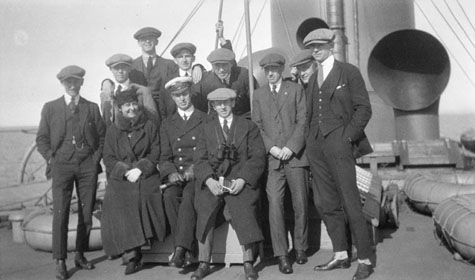
Picture of the gold medal-winning Winnipeg Falcons (representing Canada) taken en route to the 1920 Summer Olympics

Ice hockey is a sport that is contested at the Winter Olympic Games. A men's ice hockey tournament has been held every Winter Olympics (starting in 1924); an ice hockey tournament was also held at the 1920 Summer Olympics. From 1920 to 1968, the Olympics also acted as the Ice Hockey World Championships, and the two events occurred concurrently. From 1920 until 1984, only amateur athletes were allowed to compete in the tournament, and players from the National Hockey League (NHL) were not allowed to compete. The countries that benefited most were the Soviet Bloc countries of Eastern Europe, where top athletes were state-sponsored while retaining their status as amateurs. In 1970, after a disagreement over the definition of amateur players, Canada withdrew from the tournament and did not send a team to the 1972 or 1976 Winter Olympics. In 1986, the International Olympic Committee (IOC) decided to allow professional athletes to compete in the Olympics, and starting in 1998, the NHL began accommodating a break in its schedule so that the players can participate at the Winter Olympics. Women's ice hockey was added to the program in 1992 and the first tournament was held at the 1998 Winter Olympics. Both events have been held at every Olympic Games since.

In men's hockey, eight athletes have won four medals: Russians Vladislav Tretiak (three gold, one silver) and Igor Kravchuk (two gold, one silver, one bronze), Czech Jiří Holík (two silver, two bronze) and five players from Finland, each with one silver and three bronze: Teemu Selänne, Kimmo Timonen, Saku Koivu, Jere Lehtinen and Ville Peltonen. Six have won three gold medals (all from Russia): Tretiak, Anatoli Firsov, Viktor Kuzkin, Andrei Khomutov, Alexander Ragulin and Vitali Davydov.

In women's hockey, Canadians Jayna Hefford, Hayley Wickenheiser (both four gold and one silver) and Marie-Philip Poulin (three gold and two silver), and American Hilary Knight (two gold and three silver) hold the record for total medals, with five each. Canadian teammate Caroline Ouellette also won four gold medals. Twelve other athletes have won four medals: seven Canadians and five Americans.

From 1920 to 1952, teams from Canada dominated the men's tournament, winning six gold and one silver medal. Canada's dominance was broken only by Great Britain in 1936. The Soviet Union began competing at the Olympics in 1956 and won nine straight Olympic medals, including seven gold. The USSR's dominance was only broken by the United States in 1960 and 1980. The Soviet Union dissolved in 1991, and in 1992, the Unified Team composed of former Soviet players won gold. Since then, the competition has been more even, with Canada winning three times, Sweden twice and the Czech Republic, Russia, Finland and the United States once each. Teams from Canada have won the most medals, with sixteen, including nine gold. As of the 2018 Winter Olympics, 90 medals (30 of each color) have been awarded to teams from 14 National Olympic Committees.

== Men ==
Individuals who have been inducted to the Hockey Hall of Fame (including announced members awaiting induction) are indicated as follows:

- Bold type: Inducted as players.
- Italics: Inducted in a non-playing role.

Games	Gold	Silver	Bronze
1920 Antwerp	Canada (1); Robert Benson; Walter Byron; **Frank Fredrickson**; Chris Fridfinnson; Magnus Goodman; Haldor Halderson; Konrad Johannesson; Allan Woodman	United States (1); Raymond Bonney; Anthony Conroy; Herbert Drury; Edward Fitzgerald; George Geran; **Frank Goheen**; Joseph McCormick; Lawrence McCormick; Frank Synott; Leon Tuck; Cyril Weidenborner	Czechoslovakia (1); Karel Hartmann; Vilém Loos; Jan Palouš; Jan Peka; Karel Pešek; Josef Šroubek; Otakar Vindyš; Karel Wälzer^{[Note 2]}
1924 Chamonix	Canada (2); Jack Cameron; Ernie Collett; Bert McCaffrey; Harold McMunn; Duncan Munro; Beattie Ramsay; Cyril Slater; **Reginald Smith**; **Harry Watson**	United States (2); Clarence Abel; Herbert Drury; Alphonse Lacroix; John Langley; John Lyons; Justin McCarthy; Willard Rice; Irving Small; Frank Synott	Great Britain (1); William Anderson; Lorne Carr-Harris; Colin Carruthers; Eric Carruthers; Guy Clarkson; Ross Cuthbert; Geoffrey Holmes; Hamilton Jukes; Edward Pitblado; Blaine Sexton
1928 St. Moritz	Canada (3); Charles Delahaye; Frank Fisher; Grant Gordon; Louis Hudson; Norbert Mueller; Herbert Plaxton; Hugh Plaxton; Roger Plaxton; John Porter; Frank Sullivan; Joseph Sullivan; Ross Taylor; Dave Trottier	Sweden (1); Carl Abrahamsson; Emil Bergman; Birger Holmqvist; Gustaf Johansson; Henry Johansson; Nils Johansson; Ernst Karlberg; Erik Larsson; Bertil Linde; Sigfrid Öberg; Wilhelm Petersén; Kurt Sucksdorff	Switzerland (1); Giannin Andreossi; Mezzi Andreossi; Robert Breiter; Louis Dufour; Charles Fasel; Albert Geromini; Fritz Kraatz; Arnold Martignoni; Heini Meng; Anton Morosani; Luzius Rüedi; Richard Torriani
1932 Lake Placid	Canada (4); William Cockburn; Clifford Crowley; Albert Duncanson; George Garbutt; Roy Henkel; Victor Lindquist; Norman Malloy; Walter Monson; Kenneth Moore; Romeo Rivers; Harold Simpson; Hugh Sutherland; Stanley Wagner; Alston Wise	United States (3); Osborne Anderson; Johnny Bent; John Chase; John Cookman; Douglas Everett; Franklin Farrel; Joseph Fitzgerald; Edwin Frazier; John Garrison; Gerard Hallock; Robert Livingston; Francis Nelson; Winthrop Palmer; Gordon Smith	Germany (1); Rudi Ball; Alfred Heinrich; Erich Herker; Gustav Jaenecke; Werner Korff; Walter Leinweber; Erich Römer; Martin Schröttle; Marquardt Slevogt; Georg Strobl
1936 Garmisch- Partenkirchen	Great Britain (1); Alexander Archer; James Borland; Edgar Brenchley; James Chappell; John Coward; Gordon Dailley; John Davey; Carl Erhardt; James Foster; John Kilpatrick; Archibald Stinchcombe; Robert Wyman	Canada (1); Maxwell Deacon; Hugh Farquharson; Kenneth Farmer; James Haggarty; Walter Kitchen; Raymond Milton; Francis Moore; Herman Murray; Arthur Nash; David Neville; Alexander Sinclair; Ralph St. Germain; Bill Thomson	United States (1); John Garrison; August Kammer; Philip LaBatte; John Lax; Thomas Moone; Elbridge Ross; Paul Rowe; Francis Shaughnessy; Gordon Smith; Francis Spain; Frank Stubbs
1948 St. Moritz	Canada (5); Murray Dowey; Bernard Dunster; Jean Gravelle; Patrick Guzzo; Walter Halder; Thomas Hibberd; Henri-André Laperriere; John Lecompte; George Mara; Albert Roméo Renaud; Reginald Schroeter; Irving Taylor	Czechoslovakia (1); Vladimír Bouzek; Augustin Bubník; Jaroslav Drobný; Přemysl Hajný; Zdeněk Jarkovský; Vladimír Kobranov; Stanislav Konopásek; Bohumil Modrý; Miloslav Pokorný; Václav Roziňák; Miroslav Sláma; Karel Stibor; Vilibald Šťovík; Ladislav Troják; Josef Trousílek; Oldřich Zábrodský; Vladimír Zábrodský	Switzerland (2); Hans Bänninger; Alfred Bieler; Heinrich Boller; Ferdinand Cattini; Hans Cattini; Hans Dürst; Walter Paul Dürst; Emil Handschin; Heini Lohrer; Werner Lohrer; Reto Perl; Gebhard Poltera; Ulrich Poltera; Beat Rüedi; Otto Schubiger; Richard Torriani; Hans-Martin Trepp
1952 Oslo	Canada (6); George Abel; John Davies; Billy Dawe; Robert Dickson; Donald Gauf; William Gibson; Ralph Hansch; Robert Meyers; David Miller; Eric Paterson; Thomas Pollock; Allan Purvis; Gordon Robertson; Louis Secco; Francis Sullivan; Bob Watt	United States (4); Ruben Bjorkman; Len Ceglarski; Joseph Czarnota; Richard Desmond; Andre Gambucci; Clifford Harrison; Gerald Kilmartin; John Mulhern; John Noah; Arnold Oss; Robert Rompre; James Sedin; Alfred Van Allen; Donald Whiston; Ken Yackel	Sweden (1); Göte Almqvist; Åke Andersson; Hans Andersson-Tvilling; Stig Andersson-Tvilling; Lasse Björn; Göte Blomqvist; Thord Flodqvist; Erik Johansson; Gösta Johansson; Rune Johansson; Sven "Tumba" Johansson; Åke Lassas; Holger Nurmela; Hans Öberg; Lars Pettersson; Lars Svensson; Sven Thunman
1956 Cortina d'Ampezzo	Soviet Union (1); Yevgeny Babich; Vsevolod Bobrov; Alexei Guryshev; Nikolay Khlystov; Valentin Kuzin; Yuri Krylov; Alfred Kuchevsky; Grigory Mkrtychan; Viktor Nikiforov; Yuri Pantyukhov; Nikolaï Puchkov; Viktor Shuvalov; Genrikh Sidorenkov; Nikolai Sologubov; Ivan Tregubov; Dmitry Ukolov; Aleksandr Uvarov	United States (5); Wendell Anderson; Wellington Burtnett; Eugene Campbell; Gordon Christian; Bill Cleary; Richard Dougherty; Willard Ikola; John Matchefts; John Mayasich; Daniel McKinnon; Richard Meredith; Weldon Olson; John Petroske; Kenneth Purpur; Don Rigazio; Richard Rodenheiser; Ed Sampson	Canada (1); Denis Brodeur; Charles Brooker; William Colvin; Alfred Horne; Art Hurst; Byrle Klinck; Paul Knox; Ken Laufman; Howard Lee; James Logan; Floyd Martin; Jack McKenzie; Donald Rope; George Scholes; Gerry Theberge; Robert White; Keith Woodall
1960 Squaw Valley	United States (1); Bill Christian; Roger Christian; Bill Cleary; Bob Cleary; Eugene Grazia; Paul Johnson; Jack Kirrane; John Mayasich; Jack McCartan; Robert McVey; Richard Meredith; Weldon Olson; Edwyn Owen; Rodney Paavola; Lawrence Palmer; Richard Rodenheiser; Tommy Williams	Canada (2); Bob Attersley; Maurice Benoît; James Connelly; Jack Douglas; Fred Etcher; Robert Forhan; Don Head; Harold Hurley; Ken Laufman; Floyd Martin; Robert McKnight; Cliff Pennington; Donald Rope; Bobby Rousseau; George Samolenko; Harry Sinden; Darryl Sly	Soviet Union (1); Veniamin Alexandrov; Aleksandr Almetov; Yury Baulin; Mikhail Bychkov; Vladimir Grebennikov; Yevgeny Groshev; Nikolay Karpov; Alfred Kuchevsky; Konstantin Loktev; Stanislav Petukhov; Viktor Pryazhnikov; Nikolai Puchkov; Genrikh Sidorenkov; Nikolai Sologubov; Yury Tsitsinov; Viktor Yakushev; Yevgeny Yorkin
1964 Innsbruck	Soviet Union (2); Veniamin Alexandrov; Aleksandr Almetov; Vitaly Davydov; Anatoli Firsov; Eduard Ivanov; Viktor Konovalenko; Viktor Kuzkin; Konstantin Loktev; Boris Mayorov; Yevgeni Mayorov; Stanislav Petukhov; Alexander Ragulin; Vyacheslav Starshinov; Leonid Volkov; Victor Yakushev; Boris Zaitzev; Oleg Zaytsev	Sweden (2); Anders Andersson; Gert Blomé; Lennart Häggroth; Lennart Johansson; Nils Johansson; Sven "Tumba" Johansson; Lars-Eric Lundvall; Eilert Määttä; Hans Mild; Nils Nilsson; Bert-Ola Nordlander; Carl-Göran Öberg; Uno Öhrlund; Ronald Pettersson; Ulf Sterner; Roland Stoltz; Kjell Svensson	Czechoslovakia (2); Vlastimil Bubník; Josef Černý; Jiří Dolana; Vladimír Dzurilla; Jozef Golonka; František Gregor; Jiří Holík; Jaroslav Jiřík; Jan Klapáč; Vladimír Nadrchal; Rudolf Potsch; Stanislav Prýl; Ladislav Šmíd; Stanislav Sventek; František Tikal; Miroslav Vlach; Jaroslav Walter
1968 Grenoble	Soviet Union (3); Veniamin Alexandrov; Viktor Blinov; Vitaly Davydov; Anatoli Firsov; Anatoly Ionov; Viktor Konovalenko; Viktor Kuzkin; Boris Mayorov; Yevgeni Mishakov; Yuri Moiseev; Victor Polupanov; Alexander Ragulin; Igor Romishevsky; Vyacheslav Starshinov; Vladimir Vikulov; Oleg Zaytsev; Yevgeni Zimin; Victor Zinger	Czechoslovakia (2); Josef Černý; Vladimír Dzurilla; Jozef Golonka; Jan Havel; Petr Hejma; Jiří Holík; Josef Horešovský; Jan Hrbatý; Jaroslav Jiřík; Jan Klapáč; Jiří Kochta; Oldřich Machač; Karel Masopust; Vladimír Nadrchal; **Václav Nedomanský**; František Pospíšil; František Ševčík; Jan Suchý	Canada (2); Roger Bourbonnais; Ken Broderick; Ray Cadieux; Paul Conlin; Gary Dineen; Brian Glennie; Ted Hargreaves; Fran Huck; Marshall Johnston; Barry MacKenzie; Bill MacMillan; Steve Monteith; Morris Mott; Terry O'Malley; Danny O'Shea; Gerry Pinder; Herb Pinder; Wayne Stephenson
1972 Sapporo	Soviet Union (4); Yury Blinov; Vitaly Davydov; Anatoli Firsov; **Valeri Kharlamov**; Viktor Kuzkin; Vladimir Lutchenko; Aleksandr Maltsev; Boris Mikhailov; Yevgeni Mishakov; Alexander Pashkov; Vladimir Petrov; Alexander Ragulin; Igor Romishevsky; Vladimir Shadrin; **Vladislav Tretiak**; Gennadiy Tsygankov; Valeri Vasiliev; Vladimir Vikulov; **Alexander Yakushev**; Yevgeni Zimin	United States (6); Kevin Ahearn; Henry Boucha; Charles Brown; Keith Christiansen; Mike Curran; Robbie Ftorek; **Mark Howe**; Stuart Irving; Jim McElmury; Dick McGlynn; Bruce McIntosh; Tom Mellor; Ronald Naslund; Wally Olds; Tim Regan; Frank Sanders; Craig Sarner; Peter Sears; Timothy Sheehy	Czechoslovakia (3); Vladimír Bednář; Josef Černý; Vladimír Dzurilla; Richard Farda; Ivan Hlinka; Jiří Holeček; Jaroslav Holík; Jiří Holík; Josef Horešovský; Jiří Kochta; Oldřich Machač; Vladimír Martinec; **Václav Nedomanský**; Eduard Novák; František Pospíšil; Bohuslav Šťastný; Rudolf Tajcnár; Karel Vohralík
1976 Innsbruck	Soviet Union (5); Boris Aleksandrov; Sergei Babinov; Aleksandr Gusev; Sergei Kapustin; **Valeri Kharlamov**; Vladimir Lutchenko; Yuri Lyapkin; Aleksandr Maltsev; Boris Mikhailov; Vladimir Petrov; Vladimir Shadrin; Victor Shalimov; Aleksandr Sidelnikov; **Vladislav Tretiak**; Gennadiy Tsygankov; Valeri Vasiliev; **Alexander Yakushev**; Viktor Zhluktov	Czechoslovakia (3); Josef Augusta; Jiří Bubla; Milan Chalupa; Jiří Crha; Miroslav Dvořák; Bohuslav Ebermann; Ivan Hlinka; Jiří Holeček; Jiří Holík; Milan Kajkl; Oldřich Machač; Vladimír Martinec; Eduard Novák; Jiří Novák; Milan Nový; Jaroslav Pouzar; František Pospíšil; Bohuslav Šťastný	West Germany (2); Klaus Auhuber; Ignaz Berndaner; Wolfgang Boos; Lorenz Funk; Martin Hinterstocker; Udo Kiessling; Walter Köberle; Ernst Köpf; Anton Kehle; Erich Kühnhackl; Stefan Metz; Franz Reindl; Rainer Philipp; Alois Schloder; Rudolf Thanner; Josef Völk; Ferenc Vozar; Erich Weishaupt
1980 Lake Placid	United States (2); Bill Baker; Neal Broten; Dave Christian; Steve Christoff; Jim Craig; Mike Eruzione; John Harrington; Steve Janaszak; Mark Johnson; Rob McClanahan; Ken Morrow; Jack O'Callahan; Mike Ramsey; Mark Pavelich; Buzz Schneider; Dave Silk; Bob Suter; Eric Strobel; Mark Wells; Phil Verchota	Soviet Union (1); Helmuts Balderis; Zinetula Bilyaletdinov; **Viacheslav Fetisov**; Aleksandr Golikov; Vladimir Golikov; Alexei Kasatonov; **Valeri Kharlamov**; Vladimir Krutov; Yuri Lebedev; **Sergei Makarov**; Aleksandr Maltsev; Boris Mikhailov; Vladimir Myshkin; Vasili Pervukhin; Vladimir Petrov; Aleksandr Skvortsov; Sergei Starikov; **Vladislav Tretiak**; Valeri Vasiliev; Viktor Zhluktov	Sweden (2); Mats Åhlberg; Sture Andersson; Bo Berglund; Håkan Eriksson; Jan Eriksson; Thomas Eriksson; Leif Holmgren; Tomas Jonsson; Pelle Lindbergh; Bengt Lundholm; William Löfqvist; Harald Lückner; Per Lundqvist; Lars Molin; Mats Näslund; Lennart Norberg; Tommy Samuelsson; Dan Söderström; Mats Waltin; Ulf Weinstock
1984 Sarajevo	Soviet Union (6); Zinetula Bilyaletdinov; Nikolai Drozdetsky; **Viacheslav Fetisov**; Aleksandr Geramisov; Alexei Kasatonov; Andrei Khomutov; Vladimir Kovin; Aleksandr Kozhevnikov; Vladimir Krutov; **Igor Larionov**; **Sergei Makarov**; Vladimir Myshkin; Vasili Pervukhin; Sergei Shepelev; Aleksandr Skvortsov; Sergei Starikov; Igor Stelnov; **Vladislav Tretiak**; Viktor Tyumenev; Mikhail Vasiliev	Czechoslovakia (4); Jaroslav Benák; Vladimír Caldr; Milan Chalupa; František Černík; Miloslav Hořava; Jiří Hrdina; Arnold Kadlec; Jaroslav Korbela; Jiří Králík; Vladimír Kýhos; Jiří Lála; Igor Liba; Vincent Lukáč; Dušan Pašek; Pavel Richter; Jaromír Šindel; Radoslav Svoboda; Eduard Uvíra	Sweden (3); Thomas Åhlén; Pelle Eklund; Thom Eklund; Bo Ericson; Håkan Eriksson; Peter Gradin; Mats Hessel; Michael Hjälm; Göran Lindblom; Tommy Mörth; Håkan Nordin; Rolf Ridderwall; Jens Öhling; Thomas Rundqvist; Tomas Sandström; Håkan Södergren; Mats Thelin; Michael Thelvén; Mats Waltin; Göte Wälitalo
1988 Calgary	Soviet Union (7); Ilya Byakin; Vyacheslav Bykov; Aleksandr Chernykh; **Viacheslav Fetisov**; Alexei Gusarov; Valeri Kamensky; Alexei Kasatonov; Andrei Khomutov; Aleksandr Kozhevnikov; Igor Kravchuk; Vladimir Krutov; **Igor Larionov**; Andrei Lomakin; **Sergei Makarov**; **Alexander Mogilny**; Sergei Mylnikov; Vitali Samoilov; Anatoli Semenov; Sergei Starikov; Igor Stelnov; Sergei Svetlov; Sergei Yashin	Finland (1); Timo Blomqvist; Kari Eloranta; Raimo Helminen; Iiro Järvi; Esa Keskinen; Erkki Laine; Kari Laitinen; Erkki Lehtonen; Jyrki Lumme; Reijo Mikkolainen; Jarmo Myllys; Teppo Numminen; Janne Ojanen; Arto Ruotanen; Reijo Ruotsalainen; Simo Saarinen; Kai Suikkanen; Timo Susi; Jukka Tammi; Jari Torkki; Pekka Tuomisto; Jukka Virtanen	Sweden (4); Mikael Andersson; Peter Andersson; Peter Åslin; Bo Berglund; Jonas Bergqvist; Thom Eklund; Anders Eldebrink; Peter Eriksson; Thomas Eriksson; Michael Hjälm; Lars Ivarsson; Mikael Johansson; Lars Karlsson; Mats Kihlström; Peter Lindmark; Lars Molin; Jens Öhling; Lars-Gunnar Pettersson; Thomas Rundqvist; Tommy Samuelsson; Ulf Sandström; Håkan Södergren
1992 Albertville	Unified Team (1); Sergei Bautin; Igor Boldin; Nikolai Borschevsky; Vyacheslav Butsayev; Vyacheslav Bykov; Evgeny Davydov; Darius Kasparaitis; Nikolai Khabibulin; Yuri Khmylev; Andrei Khomutov; Andrei Kovalenko; Alexei Kovalev; Igor Kravchuk; Vladimir Malakhov; Dmitri Mironov; Sergei Petrenko; Vitali Prokhorov; Mikhail Shtalenkov; Andrei Trefilov; Dmitri Yushkevich; Alexei Zhamnov; Alexei Zhitnik; **Sergei Zubov**	Canada (3); Dave Archibald; Todd Brost; Sean Burke; Kevin Dahl; Curt Giles; Dave Hannan; Gord Hynes; Fabian Joseph; Joé Juneau; Trevor Kidd; Patrick Lebeau; Chris Lindberg; **Eric Lindros**; Kent Manderville; Adrien Plavsic; Dan Ratushny; Sam St. Laurent; Brad Schlegel; Wally Schreiber; Randy Smith; Dave Tippett; Brian Tutt; Jason Woolley	Czechoslovakia (4); Patrik Augusta; Petr Bříza; Jaromír Dragan; Leo Gudas; Miloslav Hořava; Petr Hrbek; Otakar Janecký; Tomáš Jelínek; Drahomír Kadlec; Kamil Kašťák; Robert Lang; Igor Liba; Ladislav Lubina; František Procházka; Petr Rosol; Bedřich Ščerban; Jiří Šlégr; Richard Šmehlík; Róbert Švehla; Oldřich Svoboda; Radek Ťoupal; Peter Veselovský
1994 Lillehammer	Sweden (1); Håkan Algotsson; Charles Berglund; Jonas Bergqvist; Andreas Dackell; Christian Due-Boje; Niklas Eriksson; **Peter Forsberg**; Roger Hansson; Roger Johansson; Jörgen Jönsson; Kenny Jönsson; Tomas Jonsson; Patrik Juhlin; Patric Kjellberg; Håkan Loob; Mats Näslund; Stefan Örnskog; Leif Rohlin; Daniel Rydmark; Tommy Salo; Fredrik Stillman; Magnus Svensson	Canada (4); Mark Astley; Adrian Aucoin; David Harlock; Corey Hirsch; Todd Hlushko; Greg Johnson; Fabian Joseph; **Paul Kariya**; Chris Kontos; Manny Legacé; Ken Lovsin; Derek Mayer; Petr Nedvěd; Dwayne Norris; Greg Parks; Allain Roy; Jean-Yves Roy; Brian Savage; Brad Schlegel; Wally Schreiber; Chris Therien; Todd Warriner; Brad Werenka	Finland (1); Mika Alatalo; Erik Hämäläinen; Raimo Helminen; Timo Jutila; Sami Kapanen; Esa Keskinen; Marko Kiprusoff; Saku Koivu; Pasi Kuivalainen; Janne Laukkanen; Tero Lehterä; Jere Lehtinen; Mikko Mäkelä; Jarmo Myllys; Mika Nieminen; Janne Ojanen; Marko Palo; Ville Peltonen; Pasi Sormunen; Mika Strömberg; Jukka Tammi; Petri Varis; Hannu Virta
1998 Nagano	Czech Republic (1); Josef Beránek; Jan Čaloun; Roman Čechmánek; Jiří Dopita; Roman Hamrlík; **Dominik Hašek**; Milan Hejduk; Jaromír Jágr; František Kučera; Robert Lang; David Moravec; Pavel Patera; Libor Procházka; Martin Procházka; Robert Reichel; Martin Ručínský; Vladimír Růžička; Jiří Šlégr; Richard Šmehlík; Jaroslav Špaček; Martin Straka; Petr Svoboda	Russia (1); **Pavel Bure**; Valeri Bure; **Sergei Fedorov**; Sergei Gonchar; Alexei Gusarov; Valeri Kamensky; Darius Kasparaitis; Andrei Kovalenko; Igor Kravchuk; Sergei Krivokrasov; Boris Mironov; Dmitri Mironov; Aleksey Morozov; Sergei Nemchinov; Oleg Shevtsov; Mikhail Shtalenkov; German Titov; Andrei Trefilov; Alexei Yashin; Dmitri Yushkevich; Valeri Zelepukin; Alexei Zhamnov; Alexei Zhitnik	Finland (2); Aki-Petteri Berg; Tuomas Grönman; Raimo Helminen; Sami Kapanen; Saku Koivu; **Jari Kurri**; Janne Laukkanen; Jere Lehtinen; Juha Lind; Jyrki Lumme; Jarmo Myllys; Mika Nieminen; Janne Niinimaa; Teppo Numminen; Ville Peltonen; Kimmo Rintanen; **Teemu Selänne**; Ari Sulander; Jukka Tammi; Esa Tikkanen; Kimmo Timonen; Antti Törmänen; Juha Ylönen
2002 Salt Lake City	Canada (7); **Ed Belfour**; **Rob Blake**; Eric Brewer; **Martin Brodeur**; Theoren Fleury; Adam Foote; Simon Gagné; **Jarome Iginla**; Curtis Joseph; Ed Jovanovski; **Paul Kariya**; **Mario Lemieux**; **Eric Lindros**; **Al MacInnis**; **Scott Niedermayer**; **Joe Nieuwendyk**; Owen Nolan; Michael Peca; **Chris Pronger**; **Joe Sakic**; **Brendan Shanahan**; Ryan Smyth; **Steve Yzerman**	United States (7); Tony Amonte; **Tom Barrasso**; **Chris Chelios**; Adam Deadmarsh; Chris Drury; Mike Dunham; Bill Guerin; **Phil Housley**; **Brett Hull**; John LeClair; **Brian Leetch**; Aaron Miller; **Mike Modano**; Tom Poti; Brian Rafalski; Mike Richter; **Jeremy Roenick**; Brian Rolston; Gary Suter; **Keith Tkachuk**; Doug Weight; Mike York; Scott Young	Russia (1); Maxim Afinogenov; Ilya Bryzgalov; **Pavel Bure**; Valeri Bure; **Pavel Datsyuk**; **Sergei Fedorov**; Sergei Gonchar; Darius Kasparaitis; Nikolai Khabibulin; Ilya Kovalchuk; Alexei Kovalev; Igor Kravchuk; Oleg Kvasha; **Igor Larionov**; Vladimir Malakhov; Daniil Markov; Boris Mironov; Andrei Nikolishin; Yegor Podomatsky; Sergei Samsonov; Oleg Tverdovsky; Alexei Yashin; Alexei Zhamnov
2006 Turin	Sweden (2); **Daniel Alfredsson**; Per-Johan Axelsson; Christian Bäckman; **Peter Forsberg**; Mika Hannula; Niclas Hävelid; Tomas Holmström; Jörgen Jönsson; Kenny Jönsson; Niklas Kronwall; **Nicklas Lidström**; Stefan Liv; **Henrik Lundqvist**; Fredrik Modin; Mattias Öhlund; Samuel Påhlsson; Mikael Samuelsson; **Daniel Sedin**; **Henrik Sedin**; **Mats Sundin**; Ronnie Sundin; Mikael Tellqvist; Daniel Tjärnqvist; Henrik Zetterberg	Finland (2); Niklas Bäckström; Aki-Petteri Berg; Niklas Hagman; Jukka Hentunen; Jussi Jokinen; Olli Jokinen; Niko Kapanen; Mikko Koivu; Saku Koivu; Lasse Kukkonen; Antti Laaksonen; Jere Lehtinen; Toni Lydman; Antti-Jussi Niemi; Ville Nieminen; Antero Niittymäki; Fredrik Norrena; Petteri Nummelin; Teppo Numminen; Ville Peltonen; Jarkko Ruutu; Sami Salo; **Teemu Selänne**; Kimmo Timonen	Czech Republic (1); Jan Bulis; Petr Čajánek; Patrik Eliáš; Martin Erat; **Dominik Hašek**; Milan Hejduk; Aleš Hemský; Milan Hnilička; Jaromír Jágr; František Kaberle; Tomáš Kaberle; Aleš Kotalík; Filip Kuba; Pavel Kubina; Robert Lang; Marek Malík; Rostislav Olesz; Václav Prospal; Martin Ručinský; Dušan Salfický; Jaroslav Špaček; Martin Straka; Tomáš Vokoun; David Výborný; Marek Židlický
2010 Vancouver	Canada (8); **Patrice Bergeron**; Dan Boyle; **Martin Brodeur**; Sidney Crosby; Drew Doughty; Marc-André Fleury; Ryan Getzlaf; Dany Heatley; **Jarome Iginla**; **Duncan Keith**; **Roberto Luongo**; Patrick Marleau; Brenden Morrow; Rick Nash; **Scott Niedermayer**; Corey Perry; **Chris Pronger**; Mike Richards; Brent Seabrook; Eric Staal; **Joe Thornton**; Jonathan Toews; **Shea Weber**	United States (8); David Backes; Dustin Brown; Ryan Callahan; Chris Drury; Tim Gleason; Erik Johnson; Jack Johnson; Patrick Kane; Ryan Kesler; Phil Kessel; Jamie Langenbrunner; Ryan Malone; Ryan Miller; Brooks Orpik; Zach Parise; Joe Pavelski; Jonathan Quick; Brian Rafalski; Bobby Ryan; Paul Stastny; Ryan Suter; Tim Thomas; Ryan Whitney	Finland (3); Niklas Bäckström; Valtteri Filppula; Niklas Hagman; Jarkko Immonen; Olli Jokinen; Niko Kapanen; Miikka Kiprusoff; Mikko Koivu; Saku Koivu; Lasse Kukkonen; Jere Lehtinen; Sami Lepistö; Toni Lydman; Antti Miettinen; Antero Niittymäki; Janne Niskala; Ville Peltonen; Joni Pitkänen; Jarkko Ruutu; Tuomo Ruutu; Sami Salo; **Teemu Selänne**; Kimmo Timonen
2014 Sochi	Canada (9); Jamie Benn; **Patrice Bergeron**; Jay Bouwmeester; Jeff Carter; Sidney Crosby; Drew Doughty; Matt Duchene; Ryan Getzlaf; Dan Hamhuis; **Duncan Keith**; Chris Kunitz; **Roberto Luongo**; Patrick Marleau; Rick Nash; Corey Perry; Alex Pietrangelo; **Carey Price**; Patrick Sharp; Mike Smith; **Martin St. Louis**; P. K. Subban; John Tavares; Jonathan Toews; Marc-Édouard Vlasic; **Shea Weber**	Sweden (3); **Daniel Alfredsson**; Nicklas Bäckström; Patrik Berglund; Alexander Edler; Oliver Ekman-Larsson; Jhonas Enroth; Jimmie Ericsson; Jonathan Ericsson; Loui Eriksson; Jonas Gustavsson; Carl Hagelin; Niklas Hjalmarsson; Marcus Johansson; Erik Karlsson; Niklas Kronwall; Marcus Krüger; Gabriel Landeskog; **Henrik Lundqvist**; Gustav Nyquist; Johnny Oduya; **Daniel Sedin**; Jakob Silfverberg; Alexander Steen; Henrik Tallinder; Henrik Zetterberg	Finland (4); Juhamatti Aaltonen; Aleksander Barkov; Mikael Granlund; Juuso Hietanen; Jarkko Immonen; Jussi Jokinen; Olli Jokinen; Leo Komarov; Sami Lepistö; Petri Kontiola; Lauri Korpikoski; Lasse Kukkonen; Jori Lehterä; Kari Lehtonen; Olli Määttä; Antti Niemi; Antti Pihlström; Tuukka Rask; Tuomo Ruutu; Sakari Salminen; Sami Salo; **Teemu Selänne**; Kimmo Timonen; Ossi Väänänen; Sami Vatanen
2018 Pyeongchang	Olympic Athletes from Russia (1); Sergei Andronov; Alexander Barabanov; **Pavel Datsyuk**; Vladislav Gavrikov; Mikhail Grigorenko; Nikita Gusev; Ilya Kablukov; Sergei Kalinin; Kirill Kaprizov; Bogdan Kiselevich; Vasily Koshechkin; Ilya Kovalchuk; Alexei Marchenko; Sergei Mozyakin; Nikita Nesterov; Nikolai Prokhorkin; Igor Shestyorkin; Vadim Shipachyov; Sergei Shirokov; Ilya Sorokin; Ivan Telegin; Vyacheslav Voynov; Yegor Yakovlev; Artyom Zub; Andrei Zubarev	Germany (1); Sinan Akdag; Danny aus den Birken; Daryl Boyle; Yasin Ehliz; Christian Ehrhoff; Dennis Endras; Gerrit Fauser; Marcel Goc; Patrick Hager; Frank Hördler; Dominik Kahun; Marcus Kink; Björn Krupp; Brooks Macek; Frank Mauer; Jonas Müller; Moritz Müller; Marcel Noebels; Timo Pielmeier; Leonhard Pföderl; Matthias Plachta; Patrick Reimer; Felix Schütz; Yannic Seidenberg; David Wolf	Canada (3); Rene Bourque; Gilbert Brulé; Andrew Ebbett; Stefan Elliott; Chay Genoway; Cody Goloubef; Marc-André Gragnani; Quinton Howden; Chris Kelly; Rob Klinkhammer; Brandon Kozun; Maxim Lapierre; Chris Lee; Maxim Noreau; Eric O'Dell; Justin Peters; Kevin Poulin; Mason Raymond; Mat Robinson; Derek Roy; Ben Scrivens; Karl Stollery; Christian Thomas; Linden Vey; Wojtek Wolski
2022 Beijing	Finland (1); Miro Aaltonen; Marko Anttila; Hannes Björninen; Valtteri Filppula; Niklas Friman; Markus Granlund; Teemu Hartikainen; Juuso Hietanen; Valtteri Kemiläinen; Leo Komarov; Mikko Lehtonen; Petteri Lindbohm; Saku Mäenalanen; Sakari Manninen; Joonas Nättinen; Atte Ohtamaa; Niko Ojamäki; Juho Olkinuora; Iiro Pakarinen; Harri Pesonen; Ville Pokka; Toni Rajala; Harri Säteri; Frans Tuohimaa; Sami Vatanen	ROC (1); Sergei Andronov; Timur Bilyalov; Andrei Chibisov; Ivan Fedotov; Stanislav Galiev; Mikhail Grigorenko; Arseni Gritsyuk; Nikita Gusev; Pavel Karnaukhov; Artur Kayumov; Artyom Minulin; Nikita Nesterov; Alexander Nikishin; Sergei Plotnikov; Alexander Samonov; Kirill Semyonov; Damir Sharipzyanov; Vadim Shipachyov; Anton Slepyshev; Sergei Telegin; Vladimir Tkachyov; Dmitri Voronkov; Slava Voynov; Egor Yakovlev; Alexander Yelesin	Slovakia (1); Peter Cehlárik; Michal Čajkovský; Peter Čerešňák; Marko Daňo; Marek Ďaloga; Martin Gernát; Adrián Holešinský; Marek Hrivík; Libor Hudáček; Tomáš Jurčo; Miloš Kelemen; Branislav Konrád; Michal Krištof; Samuel Kňažko; Martin Marinčin; Šimon Nemec; Kristián Pospíšil; Pavol Regenda; Miloš Roman; Mislav Rosandić; Patrik Rybár; Juraj Slafkovský; Samuel Takáč; Matej Tomek; Peter Zuzin
2026 Milan	United States (3); Matt Boldy; Kyle Connor; Jack Eichel; Brock Faber; Jake Guentzel; Noah Hanifin; Connor Hellebuyck; Jack Hughes; Quinn Hughes; Clayton Keller; Jackson LaCombe; Dylan Larkin; Auston Matthews; Charlie McAvoy; J.T. Miller; Brock Nelson; Jake Oettinger; Jake Sanderson; Jaccob Slavin; Jeremy Swayman; Tage Thompson; Brady Tkachuk; Matthew Tkachuk; Vincent Trocheck; Zach Werenski	Canada (5); Sam Bennett; Jordan Binnington; Macklin Celebrini; Sidney Crosby; Drew Doughty; Brandon Hagel; Thomas Harley; Bo Horvat; Seth Jarvis; Darcy Kuemper; Nathan MacKinnon; Cale Makar; Brad Marchand; Mitch Marner; Connor McDavid; Josh Morrissey; Colton Parayko; Sam Reinhart; Travis Sanheim; Mark Stone; Nick Suzuki; Shea Theodore; Logan Thompson; Devon Toews; Tom Wilson	Finland (5); Sebastian Aho; Joel Armia; Mikael Granlund; Erik Haula; Miro Heiskanen; Roope Hintz; Henri Jokiharju; Kaapo Kakko; Oliver Kapanen; Joel Kiviranta; Joonas Korpisalo; Kevin Lankinen; Artturi Lehkonen; Mikko Lehtonen; Esa Lindell; Anton Lundell; Eetu Luostarinen; Olli Määttä; Nikolas Matinpalo; Niko Mikkola; Mikko Rantanen; Rasmus Ristolainen; Juuse Saros; Teuvo Teräväinen; Eeli Tolvanen

- Medals:

Rank	Nation	Gold	Silver	Bronze	Total
1	Canada	9	5	3	17
2	Soviet Union	7	1	1	9
3	United States	3	8	1	12
4	Sweden	2	3	4	9
5	Finland	1	2	5	8
6	Czech Republic	1	0	1	2
6	Great Britain	1	0	1	2
8	Olympic Athletes from Russia	1	0	0	1
8	Unified Team	1	0	0	1
10	Czechoslovakia	0	4	4	8
11	Germany	0	1	1	2
11	Russia	0	1	1	2
13	ROC	0	1	0	1
14	Switzerland	0	0	2	2
15	Slovakia	0	0	1	1
15	West Germany	0	0	1	1
Totals (16 entries)		**26**	**26**	**26**	**78**

== Women ==
Individuals who have been inducted to the Hockey Hall of Fame (including announced members awaiting induction) are indicated as follows:

- Bold type: Inducted as players.
- Italics: Inducted in a non-playing role.

Games	Gold	Silver	Bronze
1998 Nagano	United States (1); Chris Bailey; Laurie Baker; Alana Blahoski; Lisa Brown-Miller; Karyn Bye; Colleen Coyne; Sara Decosta; Tricia Dunn-Luoma; **Cammi Granato**; Katie King; Shelley Looney; Sue Merz; Allison Mleczko; Tara Mounsey; Vicki Movsessian; Jenny Potter; **Angela Ruggiero**; Sarah Tueting; Gretchen Ulion; Sandra Whyte	Canada (1); **Jennifer Botterill**; Thérèse Brisson; Cassie Campbell; Judy Diduck; Nancy Drolet; Lori Dupuis; **Danielle Goyette**; **Geraldine Heaney**; **Jayna Hefford**; Becky Kellar; Kathy McCormack; Karen Nystrom; Lesley Reddon; Manon Rhéaume; Laura Schuler; Fiona Smith; France St-Louis; Vicky Sunohara; **Hayley Wickenheiser**; Stacy Wilson	Finland (1); Sari Fisk; Kirsi Hänninen; Satu Huotari; Marianne Ihalainen; Johanna Ikonen; Sari Krooks; Emma Laaksonen; Sanna Lankosaari; Katja Lehto; Marika Lehtimäki; **Riikka Nieminen**; Marja-Helena Pälvilä; Tuula Puputti; Karoliina Rantamäki; Tiia Reima; Katja Riipi; Päivi Salo; Maria Selin; Liisa-Maria Sneck; Petra Vaarakallio
2002 Salt Lake City	Canada (1); Dana Antal; Kelly Bechard; **Jennifer Botterill**; Thérèse Brisson; Cassie Campbell; Isabelle Chartrand; Lori Dupuis; **Danielle Goyette**; **Geraldine Heaney**; **Jayna Hefford**; Becky Kellar; **Caroline Ouellette**; Cherie Piper; Cheryl Pounder; Tammy Lee Shewchuk; Sami Jo Small; Colleen Sostorics; **Kim St-Pierre**; Vicky Sunohara; **Hayley Wickenheiser**	United States (1); Chris Bailey; Laurie Baker; Karyn Bye; Julie Chu; **Natalie Darwitz**; Sara Decosta; Tricia Dunn-Luoma; **Cammi Granato**; Courtney Kennedy; Andrea Kilbourne; Katie King; Shelley Looney; Sue Merz; Allison Mleczko; Tara Mounsey; Jenny Potter; **Angela Ruggiero**; Sarah Tueting; Lyndsay Wall; **Krissy Wendell**	Sweden (1); Annica Åhlén; Lotta Almblad; Anna Andersson; Gunilla Andersson; Emelie Berggren; Kristina Bergstrand; Ann-Louise Edstrand; Joa Elfsberg; Erika Holst; Nanna Jansson; Maria Larsson; Ylva Lindberg; Ulrica Lindström; Kim Martin; Josefin Pettersson; Maria Rooth; Danijela Rundqvist; Evelina Samuelsson; Therese Sjölander; Anna Vikman
2006 Turin	Canada (2); Meghan Agosta; Gillian Apps; **Jennifer Botterill**; Cassie Campbell; Gillian Ferrari; **Danielle Goyette**; **Jayna Hefford**; Becky Kellar; Gina Kingsbury; Charline Labonté; Carla MacLeod; **Caroline Ouellette**; Cherie Piper; Cheryl Pounder; Colleen Sostorics; **Kim St-Pierre**; Vicky Sunohara; Sarah Vaillancourt; Katie Weatherston; **Hayley Wickenheiser**	Sweden (1); Cecilia Andersson; Gunilla Andersson; Jenni Asserholt; Ann-Louise Edstrand; Joa Elfsberg; Emma Eliasson; Erika Holst; Nanna Jansson; Ylva Lindberg; Jenny Lindqvist; Kristina Lundberg; Kim Martin; Frida Nevalainen; Emilie O'Konor; Maria Rooth; Danijela Rundqvist; Therese Sjölander; Katarina Timglas; Anna Vikman; Pernilla Winberg	United States (1); Caitlin Cahow; Julie Chu; **Natalie Darwitz**; Pam Dreyer; Tricia Dunn-Luoma; Molly Engstrom; Chanda Gunn; Jamie Hagerman; Kim Insalaco; Kathleen Kauth; Courtney Kennedy; Katie King; Kristin King; Sarah Parsons; Jenny Potter; Helen Resor; **Angela Ruggiero**; Kelly Stephens; Lyndsay Wall; **Krissy Wendell**
2010 Vancouver	Canada (3); Meghan Agosta; Gillian Apps; Tessa Bonhomme; **Jennifer Botterill**; **Jayna Hefford**; Haley Irwin; Rebecca Johnston; Becky Kellar; Gina Kingsbury; Charline Labonté; Carla MacLeod; Meaghan Mikkelson; **Caroline Ouellette**; Cherie Piper; Marie-Philip Poulin; **Kim St-Pierre**; Colleen Sostorics; Shannon Szabados; Sarah Vaillancourt; Catherine Ward; **Hayley Wickenheiser**	United States (2); Kacey Bellamy; Caitlin Cahow; Lisa Chesson; Julie Chu; **Natalie Darwitz**; Meghan Duggan; Molly Engstrom; Hilary Knight; Jocelyne Lamoureux; Monique Lamoureux; Erika Lawler; Gisele Marvin; Brianne McLaughlin; Jenny Schmidgall-Potter; **Angela Ruggiero**; Molly Schaus; Kelli Stack; Karen Thatcher; Jessie Vetter; Kerry Weiland; Jinelle Zaugg-Siergiej	Finland (2); Anne Helin; Jenni Hiirikoski; Venla Hovi; Michelle Karvinen; Mira Kuisma; Emma Laaksonen; Rosa Lindstedt; Terhi Mertanen; Heidi Pelttari; Mariia Posa; Annina Rajahuhta; Karoliina Rantamäki; Noora Räty; Mari Saarinen; Saija Sirviö; Nina Tikkinen; Minnamari Tuominen; Saara Tuominen; Linda Välimäki; Anna Vanhatalo; Marjo Voutilainen
2014 Sochi	Canada (4); Meghan Agosta-Marciano; Gillian Apps; Mélodie Daoust; Laura Fortino; **Jayna Hefford**; Haley Irwin; Brianne Jenner; Rebecca Johnston; Charline Labonté; Geneviève Lacasse; Jocelyne Larocque; Meaghan Mikkelson-Reid; **Caroline Ouellette**; Marie-Philip Poulin; Lauriane Rougeau; Natalie Spooner; Shannon Szabados; Jenn Wakefield; Catherine Ward; Tara Watchorn; **Hayley Wickenheiser**	United States (3); Kacey Bellamy; Megan Bozek; Alex Carpenter; Julie Chu; Kendall Coyne; **Brianna Decker**; Meghan Duggan; Lyndsey Fry; Amanda Kessel; Hilary Knight; Jocelyne Lamoureux; Monique Lamoureux-Kolls; Gisele Marvin; Brianne McLaughlin; Michelle Picard; Josephine Pucci; Molly Schaus; Anne Schleper; Kelli Stack; Lee Stecklein; Jessie Vetter	Switzerland (1); Janine Alder; Livia Altmann; Sophie Anthamatten; Laura Benz; Sara Benz; Nicole Bullo; Romy Eggimann; Sarah Forster; Angela Frautschi; Jessica Lutz; Julia Marty; Stefanie Marty; Alina Müller; Katrin Nabholz; Evelina Raselli; Florence Schelling; Lara Stalder; Phoebe Stanz; Anja Stiefel; Nina Waidacher
2018 Pyeongchang	United States (2); Cayla Barnes; Kacey Bellamy; Hannah Brandt; Dani Cameranesi; Kendall Coyne; **Brianna Decker**; Meghan Duggan; Kali Flanagan; Nicole Hensley; Megan Keller; Amanda Kessel; Hilary Knight; Jocelyne Lamoureux; Monique Lamoureux; Gigi Marvin; Sidney Morin; Kelly Pannek; Amanda Pelkey; Emily Pfalzer; Alex Rigsby; Maddie Rooney; Haley Skarupa; Lee Stecklein	Canada (2); Meghan Agosta; Bailey Bram; Emily Clark; Mélodie Daoust; Ann-Renée Desbiens; Renata Fast; Laura Fortino; Haley Irwin; Brianne Jenner; Rebecca Johnston; Geneviève Lacasse; Brigette Lacquette; Jocelyne Larocque; Meaghan Mikkelson; Sarah Nurse; Marie-Philip Poulin; Lauriane Rougeau; Jillian Saulnier; Natalie Spooner; Laura Stacey; Shannon Szabados; Blayre Turnbull; Jenn Wakefield	Finland (3); Sanni Hakala; Jenni Hiirikoski; Venla Hovi; Mira Jalosuo; Michelle Karvinen; Rosa Lindstedt; Petra Nieminen; Tanja Niskanen; Emma Nuutinen; Isa Rahunen; Annina Rajahuhta; Meeri Räisänen; Noora Räty; Saila Saari; Ronja Savolainen; Eveliina Suonpää; Sara Säkkinen; Susanna Tapani; Noora Tulus; Minnamari Tuominen; Ella Viitasuo; **Riikka Välilä**; Linda Välimäki
2022 Beijing	Canada (5); Erin Ambrose; Ashton Bell; Kristen Campbell; Emily Clark; Mélodie Daoust; Ann-Renée Desbiens; Renata Fast; Sarah Fillier; Brianne Jenner; Rebecca Johnston; Jocelyne Larocque; Emma Maltais; Emerance Maschmeyer; Sarah Nurse; Marie-Philip Poulin; Jamie Lee Rattray; Jill Saulnier; Ella Shelton; Natalie Spooner; Laura Stacey; Claire Thompson; Blayre Turnbull; Micah Zandee-Hart	United States (4); Cayla Barnes; Megan Bozek; Hannah Brandt; Dani Cameranesi; Alex Carpenter; Alex Cavallini; Jesse Compher; Kendall Coyne Schofield; **Brianna Decker**; Jincy Dunne; Savannah Harmon; Caroline Harvey; Nicole Hensley; Megan Keller; Amanda Kessel; Hilary Knight; Abbey Murphy; Kelly Pannek; Maddie Rooney; Abby Roque; Hayley Scamurra; Lee Stecklein; Grace Zumwinkle	Finland (4); Sanni Hakala; Jenni Hiirikoski; Elisa Holopainen; Sini Karjalainen; Michelle Karvinen; Anni Keisala; Nelli Laitinen; Julia Liikala; Eveliina Mäkinen; Petra Nieminen; Tanja Niskanen; Jenniina Nylund; Meeri Räisänen; Sanni Rantala; Ronja Savolainen; Sofianna Sundelin; Susanna Tapani; Noora Tulus; Minttu Tuominen; Viivi Vainikka; Sanni Vanhanen; Emilia Vesa; Ella Viitasuo
2026 Milan	United States (3); Cayla Barnes; Hannah Bilka; Alex Carpenter; Kendall Coyne Schofield; Britta Curl-Salemme; Joy Dunne; Laila Edwards; Aerin Frankel; Rory Guilday; Caroline Harvey; Taylor Heise; Tessa Janecke; Megan Keller; Hilary Knight; Ava McNaughton; Abbey Murphy; Kelly Pannek; Gwyneth Philips; Hayley Scamurra; Kirsten Simms; Lee Stecklein; Haley Winn; Grace Zumwinkle	Canada (3); Erin Ambrose; Emily Clark; Ann-Renée Desbiens; Renata Fast; Sarah Fillier; Jenn Gardiner; Julia Gosling; Sophie Jaques; Brianne Jenner; Jocelyne Larocque; Emma Maltais; Emerance Maschmeyer; Sarah Nurse; Kristin O'Neill; Kayle Osborne; Marie-Philip Poulin; Ella Shelton; Natalie Spooner; Laura Stacey; Kati Tabin; Claire Thompson; Blayre Turnbull; Daryl Watts	Switzerland (2); Alessia Baechler; Leoni Balzer; Andrea Brändli; Annic Büchi; Lara Christen; Rahel Enzler; Naemi Herzig; Sinja Leemann; Lena Lutz; Alina Marti; Saskia Maurer; Laure Mériguet; Alina Müller; Kaleigh Quennec; Lisa Rüedi; Vanessa Schaefer; Shannon Sigrist; Lara Stalder; Nicole Vallario; Monja Wagner; Stefanie Wetli; Ivana Wey; Laura Zimmermann

- Medals:

Rank	Nation	Gold	Silver	Bronze	Total
1	Canada	5	3	0	8
2	United States	3	4	1	8
3	Sweden	0	1	1	2
4	Finland	0	0	4	4
5	Switzerland	0	0	2	2
Totals (5 entries)		**8**	**8**	**8**	**24**

== Athlete medal leaders ==
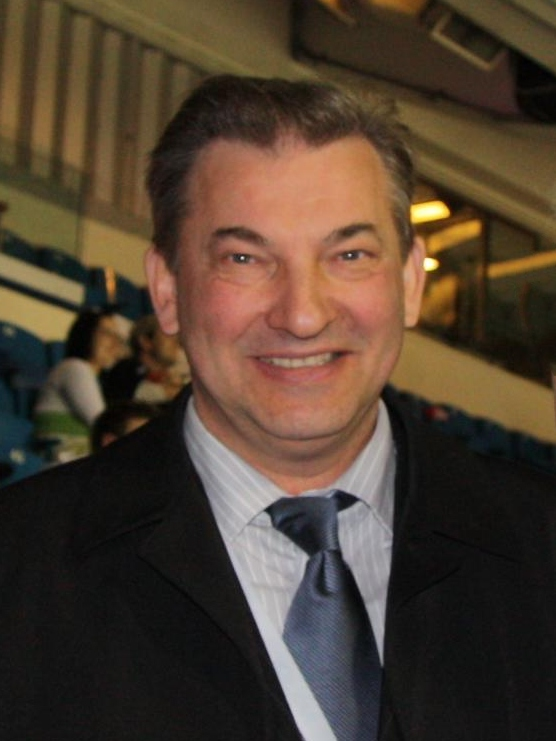
Vladislav Tretiak is the only male athlete to have won three gold medals and one silver medal.

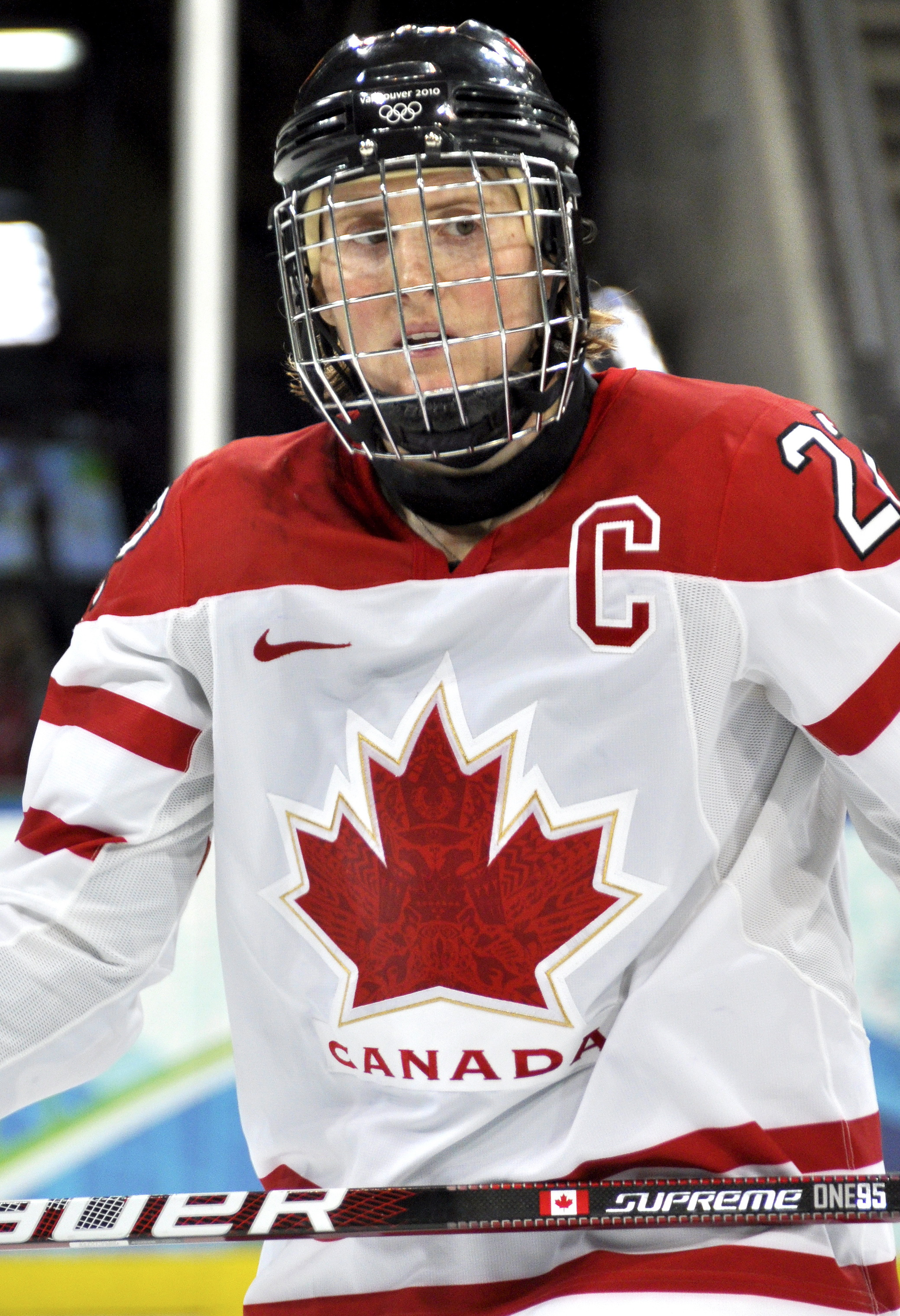
Hayley Wickenheiser is one of four athletes to win five medals – four gold and one silver.

M/W	Athlete	Nation	Olympics	Gold	Silver	Bronze	Total
W	Hayley Wickenheiser	Canada	1998–2014	4	1	0	5
W	Jayna Hefford	Canada	1998–2014	4	1	0	5
W	Marie-Philip Poulin	Canada	2010–2026	3	2	0	5
W	Hilary Knight	United States	2010–2026	2	3	0	5
W	Caroline Ouellette	Canada	2002–2014	4	0	0	4
M	Vladislav Tretiak	Soviet Union	1972–1984	3	1	0	4
W	Jennifer Botterill	Canada	1998–2010	3	1	0	4
W	Becky Kellar	Canada	1998–2010	3	1	0	4
W	Meghan Agosta	Canada	2006–2018	3	1	0	4
W	Rebecca Johnston	Canada	2010–2022	3	1	0	4
W	Kendall Coyne Schofield	United States	2014–2026	2	2	0	4
W	Brianne Jenner	Canada	2014–2026	2	2	0	4
W	Jocelyne Larocque	Canada	2014–2026	2	2	0	4
W	Natalie Spooner	Canada	2014–2026	2	2	0	4
W	Lee Stecklein	United States	2014–2026	2	2	0	4
M	Igor Kravchuk	Soviet Union; Unified Team; Russia	1988; 1992; 1998–2002	2	1	1	4
W	Angela Ruggiero	United States	1998–2010	1	2	1	4
W	Jenny Potter	United States	1998–2010	1	2	1	4
W	Julie Chu	United States	2002–2014	0	3	1	4
M	Jiří Holík	Czechoslovakia	1964–1976	0	2	2	4
M	Teemu Selänne	Finland	1992, 1998–2014	0	1	3	4
M	Kimmo Timonen	Finland	1998–2014	0	1	3	4
M	Saku Koivu	Finland	1994–2010	0	1	3	4
M	Jere Lehtinen	Finland	1994–2010	0	1	3	4
M	Ville Peltonen	Finland	1994–2010	0	1	3	4
M	Anatoli Firsov	Soviet Union	1964–1972	3	0	0	3
M	Viktor Kuzkin	Soviet Union	1964–1972	3	0	0	3
M	Alexander Ragulin	Soviet Union	1964–1972	3	0	0	3
M	Vitali Davydov	Soviet Union	1964–1972	3	0	0	3
M	Andrei Khomutov	Soviet Union; Unified Team	1984–1988; 1992	3	0	0	3
W	Cherie Piper	Canada	2002–2010	3	0	0	3
W	Kim St-Pierre	Canada	2002–2010	3	0	0	3
W	Colleen Sostorics	Canada	2002–2010	3	0	0	3
W	Gillian Apps	Canada	2006–2014	3	0	0	3
W	Charline Labonté	Canada	2006–2014	3	0	0	3

== See also ==
- Triple Gold Club
- List of IIHF World Championship medalists
- List of Stanley Cup champions
- List of ice hockey players who won the Olympic Gold and the IIHF Championship
- List of men's Olympic records in ice hockey
- List of women's Olympic records in ice hockey

== Notes ==
Note 2. The members of the 1920 Czechoslovakia team vary depending on the source. Karel Hartmann, Vilém Loos, Jan Palouš, Jan Peka, Karel Pešek, Josef Šroubek and Otakar Vindyš are all consistently included on team lists. However, there is a discrepancy over Karel Wälzer, Josef Loos, Karel Kotrba and Adolf Dušek. The following are the lineups based on the listings of the Czech Olympic Committee (COC), International Olympic Committee (IOC) and International Society of Olympic Historians (ISOH). This table does not list the seven that are included in every source.

Player	COC	IOC	ISOH
Karel Wälzer	✓	✗	✓
Josef Loos	✓	✗	✗
Karel Kotrba	✓	✗	✗
Adolf Dušek	✗	✓	✗
