= List of 1932 Winter Olympics medal winners =

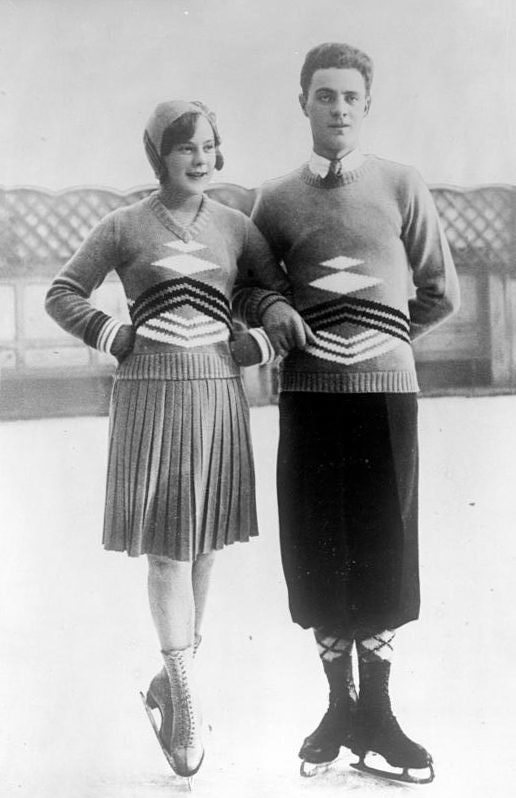
Sonja Henie of Norway and Karl Schäfer of Austria, the gold medal winners in ladies' and men's singles figure skating during the 1932 Olympic Games

The 1932 Winter Olympics, officially known as the III Olympic Winter Games, were a winter multi-sport event held in Lake Placid, New York, United States, from February 4 to February 15, 1932. A total of 252 athletes representing 17 National Olympic Committees (NOCs) participated in these Games. Overall, 14 events in 7 disciplines were contested.

The Olympic program remained similar to previous Winter Olympics, with only a few exceptions. Both men and women competed in these Games. Warm weather forced officials to hold the four-man bobsleigh competition two days after the closing ceremonies, which had been conducted on February 13.

A total of 87 athletes won medals. Athletes from the United States earned the most medals during the Games, winning 12 medals, half of which were gold. Athletes from Norway and Canada won the second and third most medals, with 10 and 7 respectively. Athletes from 10 participating NOCs won at least one medal; 7 won at least one gold medal.

Sonja Henie of Norway won her second consecutive gold medal in the ladies' individual figure skating competition. Andrée Brunet and Pierre Brunet of France won their third consecutive medal in pairs figure skating, having won bronze in Chamonix before golds in St. Moritz and Lake Placid. In the men's event, Austrian figure skater Karl Schäfer beat out three-time Olympic champion Gillis Grafström of Sweden. American Edward Eagan became the first athlete to win medals at both Summer and Winter Olympics; he had won a gold medal in light heavyweight boxing at the 1920 Summer Olympics and took home a gold in the four-man bobsleigh at Lake Placid. Although other athletes since have earned medals in both Summer and Winter Olympics, Eagan remains the only person to have won gold medals in both.

== Bobsleigh ==
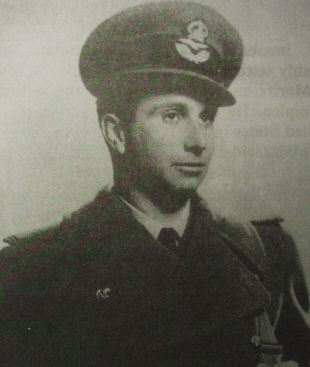
Billy Fiske, gold medalist in the four-man bobsleigh event

A number of athletes may have served as alternates for the various teams in the bobsleigh events, although there is disagreement among sources as to whether they should be considered medal winners. They are listed in the International Olympic Committee's medalist database as having won medals for teams on which they were alternates. However, while they do appear in the Official Report of the 1932 Olympic Games on pages which list members of the teams, their names are not mentioned in the pages that list winners of the events. This list only includes those athletes who were listed in the Official Report as winners of the events.

Event	Gold	Silver	Bronze
Two-man	United States; USA I Hubert Stevens; Curtis Stevens	Switzerland; Switzerland II; Reto Capadrutt; Oscar Geier	United States; USA II; John Heaton; Robert Minton
Four-man	United States; USA I Billy Fiske; Edward Eagan; Clifford Grey; Jay O'Brien	United States; USA II; Henry Homburger; Percy Bryant; Francis Stevens; Edmund Horton	Germany; Germany I Hanns Kilian; Max Ludwig; Hans Mehlhorn; Sebastian Huber

== Cross-country skiing ==
Event	Gold	Silver	Bronze
18 km	Sven Utterström; Sweden	Axel Wikström; Sweden	Veli Saarinen; Finland
50 km	Veli Saarinen; Finland	Väinö Liikkanen; Finland	Arne Rustadstuen; Norway

== Figure skating ==
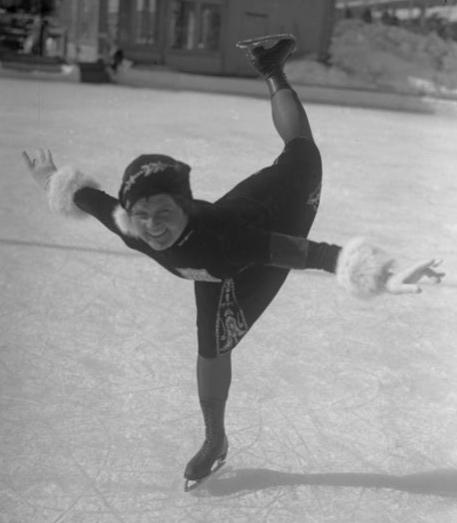
Beatrix Loughran, silver medal winner in pairs at the 1932 Winter Olympics

Event	Gold	Silver	Bronze
Men's singles	Karl Schäfer; Austria	Gillis Grafström; Sweden	Montgomery Wilson; Canada
Ladies' singles	Sonja Henie; Norway	Fritzi Burger; Austria	Maribel Vinson; United States
Pairs	France; Andrée Brunet; Pierre Brunet	United States; Beatrix Loughran; Sherwin Badger	Hungary; Emília Rotter; László Szollás

== Ice hockey ==
Event	Gold	Silver	Bronze
Men's team	Canada; William Cockburn; Clifford Crowley; Albert Duncanson; George Garbutt; Roy Henkel; Vic Lindquist; Norman Malloy; Walter Monson; Kenneth Moore; Romeo Rivers; Hack Simpson; Hugh Sutherland; Stanley Wagner; Alston Wise	United States; Osborne Anderson; Johnny Bent; John Chase; John Cookman; Douglas Everett; Franklin Farrel; Joseph Fitzgerald; Edwin Frazier; John Garrison; Gerard Hallock; Robert Livingston; Francis Nelson; Winthrop Palmer; Gordon Smith	Germany; Rudi Ball; Alfred Heinrich; Erich Herker; Gustav Jaenecke; Werner Korff; Walter Leinweber; Erich Römer; Martin Schröttle; Marquardt Slevogt; Georg Strobl

== Nordic combined ==
Event	Gold	Silver	Bronze
Men's individual	Johan Grøttumsbråten; Norway	Ole Stenen; Norway	Hans Vinjarengen; Norway

== Ski jumping ==
Event	Gold	Silver	Bronze
Men's individual	Birger Ruud; Norway	Hans Beck; Norway	Kaare Wahlberg; Norway

== Speed skating ==
Event	Gold	Silver	Bronze
500 metres	Jack Shea; United States	Bernt Evensen; Norway	Alexander Hurd; Canada
1500 metres	Jack Shea; United States	Alexander Hurd; Canada	Willy Logan; Canada
5000 metres	Irving Jaffee; United States	Eddie Murphy; United States	Willy Logan; Canada
10000 metres	Irving Jaffee; United States	Ivar Ballangrud; Norway	Frank Stack; Canada

== Statistics ==
=== Multiple medalists ===
Athletes who won multiple medals during the 1932 Winter Olympics are listed below.

Athlete	Nation	Sport	Gold	Silver	Bronze	Total
Irving Jaffee	United States	Speed skating	2	0	0	2
John Shea	United States	Speed skating	2	0	0	2
Veli Saarinen	Finland	Cross-country skiing	1	0	1	2
Alexander Hurd	Canada	Speed skating	0	1	1	2
Willy Logan	Canada	Speed skating	0	0	2	2

== See also ==
- 1932 Winter Olympics medal table
