= Canada at the 1932 Winter Olympics =

- IOC code: CAN
- NOC: Canadian Olympic Committee
- Website: www.olympic.ca (in English and French)

in Lake Placid
- Competitors: 42 (38 men, 4 women) in 6 sports
- Flag bearer: Harold Simpson (ice hockey)
- Medals Ranked 4th: Gold 1 Silver 1 Bronze 5 Total 7

Winter Olympics appearances (overview)
- 1924; 1928; 1932; 1936; 1948; 1952; 1956; 1960; 1964; 1968; 1972; 1976; 1980; 1984; 1988; 1992; 1994; 1998; 2002; 2006; 2010; 2014; 2018; 2022; 2026

Canada competed at the 1932 Winter Olympics in Lake Placid, United States. Canada has competed at every Winter Olympic Games.

W. A. Hewitt served as chairman of the winter games sub-committee of the Canadian Olympic Committee. Melville Marks Robinson served as manager of the Canadian delegation to the Olympics, with Claude C. Robinson as the honorary assistant manager.

Canadian Olympic Committee member W. A. Fry self-published a book covering Canadian achievements at the 1932 Winter Olympics and 1932 Summer Olympics. His 1933 book, Canada at the tenth Olympiad, 1932 : Lake Placid, New York, Feb. 4 to 13 - Los Angeles, California, July 30 to Aug. 14, was printed by the Dunnville Chronicle presses and dedicated to Canadian sportsman Francis Nelson who died in 1932.

== Medalists ==
Medal	Name	Sport	Event
Gold	Canada men's national ice hockey team (The Winnipegs): William Cockburn; Clifford Crowley; Albert Duncanson; George Garbutt; Roy Henkel; Victor Lindquist; Norman Malloy; Walter Monson; Kenneth Moore; Romeo Rivers; Hack Simpson; Hugh Sutherland; Stanley Wagner; Alston Wise	Ice hockey	Men's competition
Silver	Alexander Hurd	Speed skating	Men's 1500m
Bronze	Montgomery Wilson	Figure skating	Men's singles
Bronze	Alexander Hurd	Speed skating	Men's 500m
Bronze	William Logan	Speed skating	Men's 1500m
Bronze	William Logan	Speed skating	Men's 5000m
Bronze	Frank Stack	Speed skating	Men's 10,000m

== Cross-country skiing ==
Men

Event	Athlete	Race	
Event	Athlete	Time	Rank
18 km	John Currie	1'49:03	40
18 km	John Taylor	1'48:11	39
18 km	Bud Clark	1'46:33	38
18 km	Harry Pangman	1'43:12	35
50 km	Walter Ryan	DNF	–
50 km	Hubert Douglas	DNF	–
50 km	Kaare Engstad	5'19:19	16

== Figure skating ==
Men

Athlete	Event	CF	FS	Places	Points	Final rank
Montgomery Wilson	Men's singles	3	3	24	2448.3	3rd place, bronze medalist(s)

Women

Athlete	Event	CF	FS	Places	Points	Final rank
Mary Littlejohn	Women's singles	15	15	101	1711.6	15
Elizabeth Fisher	Women's singles	13	12	82	1801.0	13
Constance Wilson-Samuel	Women's singles	4	5	28	2129.5	4

Pairs

Athletes	Points	Score	Final rank
Frances Claudet; Chauncey Bangs	36	68.9	6
Constance Wilson-Samuel; Montgomery Wilson	35	69.6	5

== Ice hockey ==
The Canadian Olympic Committee selected the Winnipeg Hockey Club as the 1931 Allan Cup champions to represent Canada. Claude C. Robinson was chosen to oversee finances for the team, while W. A. Hewitt was named honorary manager. After the Winnipeg Hockey Club won the gold medal at the Olympics, Hewitt sought for future Canadian national teams at the Olympics to be the reigning Allan Cup champion team, strengthened with six additional players.

Team	GP	W	L	T	GF	GA
Canada (gold)	6	5	0	1	32	4
United States	6	4	1	1	27	5
Germany	6	2	4	0	7	26
Poland	6	0	6	0	3	34

4 Feb	United States	1:2 OT (0:0,0:1,1:0,0:0,0:1)	Canada
6 Feb	Canada	4:1 (2:0,2:0,0:1)	Germany
7 Feb	Canada	9:0 (2:0,5:0,2:0)	Poland
8 Feb	Canada	5:0 (2:0,1:0,2:0)	Germany
9 Feb	Canada	10:0 (5:0,1:0,4:0)	Poland
13 Feb	United States	2:2 OT (1:1,1:0,0:1,0:0,0:0,0:0)	Canada

=== Top scorer ===
Team	GP	G	A	Pts
(Canada) Walter Monson	6	7	4	11

Gold:
Canada

William Cockburn
Clifford Crowley
Albert Duncanson
George Garbutt
Roy Henkel
Vic Lindquist
Norman Malloy
Walter Monson
Kenneth Moore
Romeo Rivers
Hack Simpson
Hugh Sutherland
Stanley Wagner
Alston Wise

== Nordic combined ==
Events:

- 18 km cross-country skiing
- normal hill ski jumping

The cross-country skiing part of this event was combined with the main medal event of cross-country skiing. Those results can be found above in this article in the cross-country skiing section. Some athletes (but not all) entered in both the cross-country skiing and Nordic combined event, their time on the 18 km was used for both events.

The ski jumping (normal hill) event was held separate from the main medal event of ski jumping, results can be found in the table below.

Athlete	Event	Cross-country			Ski Jumping				Total	
Athlete	Event	Time	Points	Rank	Distance 1	Distance 2	Total points	Rank	Points	Rank
Arthur Gravel	Individual	2'00:18	94.50	33	50.5	51.5	184.1	22	278.60	30
Howard Bagguley	Individual	1'50:35	133.50	25	51.0	51.5	185.2	21	318.70	24
Ross Wilson	Individual	1'43:55	162.00	21	40.0 (fall)	36.0	90.8	32	252.80	31
Jostein Nordmoe	Individual	1'42:56	165.96	18	53.0	52.5	201.6	9	367.56	10

== Ski jumping ==
Athlete	Event	Jump 1			Jump 2			Total	
Athlete	Event	Distance	Points	Rank	Distance	Points	Rank	Points	Rank
Arnold Stone	Normal hill	61.5	30.0 (fall)	33	49.0	85.5	26	115.5	29
Leslie Gagne	Normal hill	45.0	82.5	26	44.5	28.0	31	110.5	30
Jacques Landry	Normal hill	52.5	91.7	21	54.0	95.1	19	186.8	20
Bob Lymburne	Normal hill	58.0	98.6	13	51.0	93.5	22	192.1	19

== Speed skating ==
Men

Event	Athlete	Heat		Final	
Event	Athlete	Time	Position	Time	Position
500 m	Frank Stack	44.3	1 Q	n/a	4
500 m	Leopold Sylvestre	n/a	5	Did not advance	
500 m	Willy Logan	n/a	2 Q	n/a	5
500 m	Alex Hurd	44.9	1 Q	n/a	3rd place, bronze medalist(s)
1500 m	Frank Stack	n/a	2 Q	n/a	4
1500 m	Herb Flack	n/a	4	Did not advance	
1500 m	Willy Logan	n/a	2 Q	n/a	3rd place, bronze medalist(s)
1500 m	Alex Hurd	n/a	2 Q	n/a	2nd place, silver medalist(s)
5000m	Alex Hurd	DNF	–	Did not advance	
5000m	Harry Smyth	n/a	4 Q	n/a	8
5000m	Frank Stack	n/a	4 Q	n/a	7
5000m	Willy Logan	n/a	3 Q	n/a	3rd place, bronze medalist(s)
10,000 m	Marion McCarthy	DNF	–	Did not advance	
10,000 m	Alex Hurd	17:56.2	1 Q	n/a	7
10,000 m	Willy Logan	n/a	5	Did not advance	
10,000 m	Frank Stack	n/a	2 Q	n/a	3rd place, bronze medalist(s)

== Sources ==
- Lattimer, George, ed. (1932). Official Report III Olympic Winter Games Lake Placid 1932 (PDF). III Olympic Winter Games Committee. Archived from the original (PDF) on 2008-04-10.
- "Olympic Medal Winners". International Olympic Committee. Archived from the original on 2008-05-09.
- Olympic Winter Games 1932, full results by sports-reference.com
