= 1931 Allan Cup =

Canadian senior ice hockey championship

The Allan Cup trophy

The 1931 Allan Cup was the Canadian senior ice hockey championship for the 1930–31 season. It was won by the Winnipeg Hockey Club. This team also won the Keane Memorial Cup as Winnipeg's city champions, the Pattinson Cup as Manitoba's provincial champions, as well as the Olympic and world championship held in Lake Placid, New York the following year.

The roster was: Romeo Rivers, Clifford Crowley, George "Tic" Garbutt, Bill Cockburn (Captain), J. Alston "Stoney" Wise, Hugh Sutherland, Victor Lindquist, Billy Bowman (Trainer), Jack Hughes (Coach), W.J. Robertson (Manager), W.R. Bawlf (President), D.G. Thomson (Vice-President), Johnny Myers (Asst. Manager), J. Drake (Trainer), Foster Woolley, Stanley Wagner, Harold "Hack" Simpson, Roy Henkel, and Ken Moore.

The 1913 & 1931 Winnipeg Hockey Club were inducted into the Manitoba Hockey Hall of Fame in the team category.

== Final ==
Day	Month	Date	Year	Winner	Score	Loser	Score
Tuesday	March	31	1931	Winnipeg Hockey Club	2	Hamilton Tigers	1
Friday	April	3	1931	Winnipeg Hockey Club	3	Hamilton Tigers	1
