= University Club of Boston =

- City: Boston, Massachusetts
- League: Independent
- Founded: 1926
- Folded: 1932
- Home arena: Boston Arena

The University Club of Boston was an amateur ice hockey team that served as the US representative to the 1932 Winter Olympics, winning a silver medal.

== History ==
In 1926, the Boston Athletic Association ice hockey team was discontinued after its parent league, the Eastern Amateur Hockey League (not to be confused with a later league of the same name) folded. George Owen, who was captain of the team, then founded his own outfit and named it the 'University Club of Boston'. Many of the former BAA players joined with the new club, which was able to secure an arrangement with the operators of the Boston Arena to use the venue as their home rink. The majority of players who would join the team over its short existence were former college stars, but that was not a hard requirement to join the team, despite its name. The University Club would play a mix of senior amateur and collegiate opponents every year and were usually regarded as one of the top amateur teams in the country.

In 1928, due to a series of poor choices and miscommunications, the United States failed to send an ice hockey team to the 1928 Winter Olympics. In order to prevent a recurrence, the United States Olympic Committee set out a pathway for teams to apply and compete for the privilege to represent the United States at the 1932 games, which would be held in Lake Placid, more than a year ahead of time. One of the many eastern teams to apply was the University Club of Boston. Over the course of several weeks, the University Club won the single-elimination tournament for the eastern region, defeating Boston University in the final. In January of the following year, the University Club, who had by then merged with a fellow amateur club from New York City to boost its chances, met the western representative, Minnesota, in the national final to determine who would become the US Olympic team. The combined Boston-New York team defeated Minnesota 4–0 to earn the right to represent the US at the Olympic games.

The combined roster had many players available to the team, however, the US was restricted to just 10 players for the games by the Amateur Athletic Union due to the ongoing depression. After a bit of cajoling, the AAU was eventually convinced to allow 14 players to participate. The roster selected was as follows.

Player	Position	Hometown	College
Ty Anderson	D	Swampscott, Massachusetts	N/A
Johnny Bent	F/D	New York, New York	Yale
John Chase	F	Boston, Massachusetts	Harvard
John Cookman	F	New York, New York	Yale
Doug Everett	F	Boston, Massachusetts	Dartmouth
Frank Farrell	G	New York, New York	Yale
Joe Fitzgerald	F	Boston, Massachusetts	Boston College
Ed Frazier	G	Stoneham, Massachusetts	N/A
John Garrison	D	Newton, Massachusetts	Harvard
Buzz Hallock	D	New York, New York	Princeton
Bob Livingston	D	New York, New York	Princeton
Frank Nelson	F	New York, New York	Yale
Ding Palmer	F	Warehouse Point, Connecticut	Yale
Gord Smith	F	Winchester, Massachusetts	Boston University ^{†}

† Gord Smith briefly attended Boston University but he was not a member of the ice hockey team.

The US was one of only four teams to participate in ice hockey at the Olympics with most nations unable to attend due to financial problems caused by the depression. As a result, the US was almost assured to win a medal as both Germany and Poland were considered to be inferior teams. Sure enough, the US team won all four of their games against Germany and Poland by a combined score of 24–1. The only real competition for the goal medal came from Canada. The US lost the initial match between the two in overtime and then tied the rematch after three overtime periods were unable to settle the score. The narrow loss to Canada resulted in a silver medal for the team as well as plaudits to the University Club and its players.

Unfortunately, the Olympics in 1932 was the swan song for the University Club of Boston. By this time, professional ice hockey was beginning to take over in the United States and they were finding it difficult to compete not only against the Boston Bruins, but also against the more established collegiate programs. The team had already decided that it would not reform after the Olympics as the era of senior amateur hockey was nearing its end.
