= Poland at the 1932 Winter Olympics =

- IOC code: POL
- NOC: Polish Olympic Committee
- Website: www.pkol.pl (in Polish)

in Lake Placid
- Competitors: 15 (men) in 4 sports
- Flag bearer: Józef Stogowski
- Medals: Gold 0 Silver 0 Bronze 0 Total 0

Winter Olympics appearances (overview)
- 1924; 1928; 1932; 1936; 1948; 1952; 1956; 1960; 1964; 1968; 1972; 1976; 1980; 1984; 1988; 1992; 1994; 1998; 2002; 2006; 2010; 2014; 2018; 2022; 2026

Poland competed at the 1932 Winter Olympics in Lake Placid, United States.

== Cross-country skiing ==
Men

Event	Athlete	Race	
Event	Athlete	Time	Rank
18 km	Zdzisław Motyka	1'41:58	32
18 km	Stanisław Skupień	1'41:48	31
18 km	Stanisław Marusarz	1'39:56	27
18 km	Bronisław Czech	1'36:37	18
50 km	Stanisław Skupień	DNF	–
50 km	Zdzisław Motyka	DNF	–

== Ice hockey ==
Team	GP	W	L	T	GF	GA
Canada	6	5	0	1	32	4
United States	6	4	1	1	27	5
Germany	6	2	4	0	7	26
Poland (4th)	6	0	6	0	3	34

4 Feb	Germany	2:1 (0:0,1:1,1:0)	Poland
5 Feb	United States	4:1 (1:0,2:0,1:1)	Poland
7 Feb	Canada	9:0 (2:0,5:0,2:0)	Poland
8 Feb	United States	5:0 (1:0,1:0,3:0)	Poland
9 Feb	Canada	10:0 (5:0,1:0,4:0)	Poland
13 Feb	Germany	4:1 (0:0,2:1,2:0)	Poland

4th	Poland
	Adam Kowalski; Aleksander Kowalski; Włodzimierz Krygier; Witalis Ludwiczak; Czesław Marchewczyk; Kazimierz Materski; Albert Mauer; Roman Sabiński; Kazimierz Sokołowski; Józef Stogowski

== Nordic combined ==
Events:

- 18 km cross-country skiing
- normal hill ski jumping

The cross-country skiing part of this event was combined with the main medal event of cross-country skiing. Those results can be found above in this article in the cross-country skiing section. Some athletes (but not all) entered in both the cross-country skiing and Nordic combined event, their time on the 18 km was used for both events.

The ski jumping (normal hill) event was held separate from the main medal event of ski jumping, results can be found in the table below.

Athlete	Event	Cross-country			Ski Jumping				Total	
Athlete	Event	Time	Points	Rank	Distance 1	Distance 2	Total points	Rank	Points	Rank
Andrzej Marusarz	Individual	1'47:17	147.00	24	45.0	50.0	188.1	20	335.10	19
Stanisław Marusarz	Individual	1'39:56	179.25	13	50.0	49.0 (fall)	128.8	28	308.05	27
Bronisław Czech	Individual	1'36:37	195.00	8	51.0	50.0	197.0	14	392.00	7

== Ski jumping ==
Athlete	Event	Jump 1			Jump 2			Total	
Athlete	Event	Distance	Points	Rank	Distance	Points	Rank	Points	Rank
Andrzej Marusarz	Normal hill	51.5	91.3	22	54.0	94.6	21	185.9	22
Stanisław Marusarz	Normal hill	55.0	95.5	19	53.0	97.0	17	192.5	17
Bronisław Czech	Normal hill	56.0	99.1	12	60.0	101.6	14	200.7	12
