= Krygier =

Krygier is a surname. Notable people with the surname include:

- Richard Krygier (1917–1986), Polish-born Australian anti-communist publisher and journalist
- Todd Krygier (born 1965), American ice hockey player
- Włodzimierz Krygier (1900–1975), Polish ice hockey and football player
- Benjamin Krygier (born 1974), American businessman, custom home builder, police officer, motorcycle racer and private airplane pilot
