= George Owen (ice hockey) =

Canadian-American ice hockey player (1901–1986)

- Owen (circa. 1920)
- Born: December 2, 1901 Hamilton, Ontario, Canada
- Died: March 4, 1986 (aged 84) Milton, Massachusetts, U.S.
- Height: 5 ft 11 in (180 cm)
- Weight: 190 lb (86 kg; 13 st 8 lb)
- Position: Defence
- Shot: Left
- Played for: Boston Bruins
- Playing career: 1928–1933

Harvard George Owen Jr. (December 2, 1901 – March 4, 1986) was a Canadian-American professional ice hockey defenceman for the Boston Bruins of the National Hockey League (NHL).

== Career ==
Owen was a three-sport star at Harvard University, playing football, baseball and hockey. He was awarded the university's Wingate Cup for best all-around athletic ability.

After he graduated, Owen entered the brokerage business while continuing to play hockey for the Boston University Club. He was invited to play for the United States Olympic Team in 1924, but declined because of business obligations.

The Toronto Maple Leafs held Owen's professional rights; however, as Owen did not want to leave Massachusetts, the Maple Leafs traded his rights to the Boston Bruins on January 10, 1929, in exchange for Eric Pettinger. Owen played five seasons with the Bruins, pairing on defense with players including Lionel Hitchman and Eddie Shore, and won the Stanley Cup with the team in 1929.

Legend has it Owen was the first player to don a helmet in an NHL game, wearing the same leather helmet that he had worn when playing college football. However, Marty Burke of the Montreal Canadiens is known to have worn a helmet briefly during a game in December 1928, before Owen entered the NHL.

Following his playing career, Owen became head coach of the Massachusetts Institute of Technology men's ice hockey team. He later coached football, baseball and hockey at Milton Academy. After retiring from Milton Academy, Owen worked as a scout for the Pittsburgh Pirates.

== Personal life ==
Owen was born in Hamilton, Ontario and moved to Massachusetts as a teenager, attending Newton High School in suburban Boston.

He died of a stroke in Milton, Massachusetts in 1986.

== Halls of Fame ==
- United States Hockey Hall of Fame, 1973 (inaugural class)
- College Football Hall of Fame, 1983
- Massachusetts Hockey Hall of Fame, 2014

== Career statistics ==
			Regular season					Playoffs
Season	Team	League	GP	G	A	Pts	PIM	GP	G	A	Pts	PIM
1918–19	Newton High School	High-MA	—	—	—	—	—	—	—	—	—	—
1919–20	Harvard Crimson	Ivy	—	—	—	—	—	—	—	—	—	—
1920–21	Harvard Crimson	Ivy	11	10	0	10	—	—	—	—	—	—
1921–22	Harvard Crimson	Ivy	—	—	—	—	—	—	—	—	—	—
1922–23	Harvard Crimson	Ivy	—	—	—	—	—	—	—	—	—	—
1923–24	Boston A. A. Unicorns	USAHA	12	10	0	10	—	—	—	—	—	—
1924–25	Boston A. A. Unicorns	USAHA	—	—	—	—	—	—	—	—	—	—
1925–26	Boston A. A. Unicorns	EAHL	—	—	—	—	—	2	0	2	2	—
1926–27	University Club of Boston	MBHL	—	—	—	—	—	—	—	—	—	—
1927–28	University Club of Boston	MBHL	—	—	—	—	—	—	—	—	—	—
1928–29	Boston Bruins	NHL	27	5	4	9	48	5	0	0	0	0
1929–30	Boston Bruins	NHL	42	9	4	13	31	6	0	2	2	6
1930–31	Boston Bruins	NHL	38	12	13	25	33	5	2	3	5	13
1931–32	Boston Bruins	NHL	42	12	10	22	29	—	—	—	—	—
1932–33	Boston Bruins	NHL	34	6	2	8	10	5	0	0	0	6
NHL totals			183	44	33	77	151	21	2	5	7	25

Sporting positions
Preceded by Lionel Hitchman	Boston Bruins captain 1931–32	Succeeded by Dit Clapper
