= Winnipeg Hockey Club =

- City: Winnipeg, Manitoba, Canada
- League: Manitoba Hockey Association
- Colours: White, Blue

The Winnipeg Hockey Club (also known as the Winnipeg Winnipegs) were a former amateur senior-level men's amateur ice hockey team in Winnipeg, Manitoba founded in 1890. After the Winnipegs won the 1931 Allan Cup, they represented the Canada men's national ice hockey team at the 1932 Winter Olympics held at Lake Placid, New York. The team was undefeated throughout the Olympic tournament and were named the 1932 Olympic and world champions.

== History ==
=== First game in Western Canada ===
The Winnipegs played in the first match in Western Canada between organized hockey clubs on December 20, 1890 against the Winnipeg Victorias at the Street Railway Rink in Winnipeg. The players were:

Victorias
- W. H. Thompson (goal)
- Thomas A. Howard (back)
- Jack McCulloch, Jack Armytage (wings)
- George H. "Whitey" Merrit, Fred Higginbotham, Alex Norquay (forwards)
Winnipegs
- A. B. Clark (goal)
- F. L. Patton (back)
- Claude Denison, McDonald (wings)
- Frank Beckett, Harry Beckett, John R. Waghorn (forwards)

Source: "In the Early Days". The Globe. December 28, 1910. p. 11.

=== 1893 Tour schedule ===
In February 1893, players from the Winnipegs joined players from the Winnipeg Dragoons and the Winnipeg Victorias on a tour of Eastern Canada to demonstrate the quality of ice hockey in Western Canada.

Tour schedule

- February 9 - vs. Toronto Victorias at Toronto, Ontario (W 8–2)
- February 10 - vs. Toronto Osgoode Hall at Toronto (W 11–5)
- February 11 - vs. Queen's College at Kingston, Ontario (W 4–3)
- February 13 - vs. Ottawa Hockey Club at Ottawa, Ontario (L 1–4)
- February 15 - vs. Montreal Hockey Club at Montreal, Quebec (L 4–7)
- February 17 - vs. Peterborough at Peterborough, Ontario (W 9–3)
- February 20 - vs. Toronto Granites at Toronto (W 11–3)
- February 21 - vs. London at London, Ontario (W 7–1)
- February 22 - vs. Niagara Falls at Niagara Falls, Ontario (W 10–4)
- February 23 - vs. Hamilton Thistles at Hamilton, Ontario (cancelled)
- February 24 - vs. Combined Ontario/Osgoode Hall at Toronto (L 3–4)

Source: Montreal Gazette

=== League play ===
The Winnipegs entered teams in the Manitoba Hockey Association from 1893 until 1902. For many years the senior division of the MHA was simply the two Winnipeg teams. In 1908-09, the Club entered a team in the Manitoba Pro League, playing that one season.

=== 1913 Allan Cup win ===
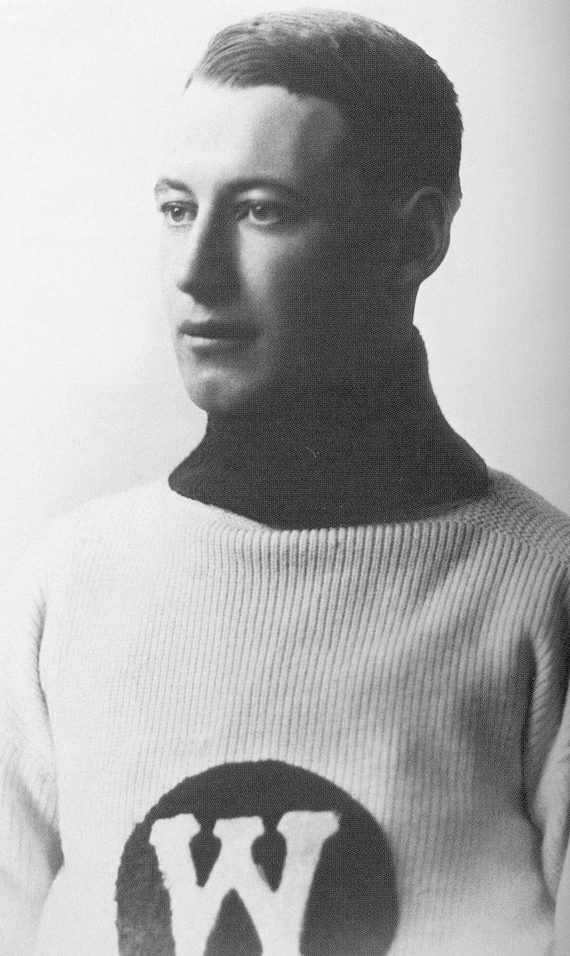
Jack Ruttan, Hockey Hall of Fame member, played with the club in 1912–13 and 1913–14.

In 1912, the Winnipeg HC entered a team in the new Manitoba Hockey League. Winnipeg defeated the defending Allan Cup champion Winnipeg Victorias to win the league championship and the Allan Cup. The Winnipegs defended the cup twice at home in March, defeating both Moose Jaw (March 11 6-0 & March 13 10-3) and Edmonton (March 15 9-6 & March 17 9-2).

ROSTER: Walter James "Ollie" Turnbull-Point, Jack Gannon-Goal, Al Adamson-Captain & Left Wing, Jack Ruttan-Cover Point, Jack E. Aldous-Centre, Billy McKenzie-Right Wing, Bert Andrews-Rover, W. Currie-Spare, Percy Browne-Coach, P. J. McKay-Spare, Harry O. English-Spare, Jack Hughes- Spare, W. Law-Trainer, Billy Breen-Coach, H. G. Mayes-Vice-Pres., D. H. Cooper-Patron, A.J. Andrews-Patron, C.M. Ruttan-Pres., D.W.F. Nichols- Sec'y/Treas.

=== 1931 Allan Cup win ===
1931 Winnipeg Hockey Club won the Allan Cup, The Keane Memorial Cup as Winnipeg Champions, the Pattison Cup as Manitoba Champions, as well as the Olympic Championship in Lake Placid, USA in 1932.

The roster was: Romeo Rivers, Clifford Crowley, George "Tic" Garbutt, Bill Cockburn (captain), J. Alston "Stoney" Wise, Hugh Sutherland, Victor Lindquist, Billy Bowman (trainer), Jack Hughes (coach), W.J. Robertson (Manager), W.R. Bawlf (president), D.G. Thomson (vice-president), Johnny Myers (asst. manager), J. Drake (trainer), Foster Woolley, Stanley Wagner, Harold "Hack" Simpson, Roy Henkel, and Ken Moore.

The 1913 & 1931 Winnipeg Hockey Club were inducted into the Manitoba Hockey Hall of Fame in the team category.

== 1932 Winter Olympics ==
The Canadian Olympic Committee selected the Winnipegs as the 1931 Allan Cup champions to represent Canada in ice hockey at the 1932 Winter Olympics. The Winnipeg won the gold medal, the fourth gold won by Canada since hockey began at the Olympic Games in 1920. Claude C. Robinson oversaw finances for the team, while W. A. Hewitt was the honorary manager.

Robinson arranged for exhibition games on route to and from the Olympics, including games in Toronto and Hamilton, Ontario, before the games. The Winnipegs then played exhibition games versus the Atlantic City Seagulls, and the Crescent Athletic Club at Madison Square Garden.

=== Player roster ===
List of Winnipeg Hockey Club members at the 1932 Winter Olympics:

- William Cockburn (goaltender)
- Clifford Crowley
- Albert Duncanson
- George Garbutt
- Roy Henkel
- Vic Lindquist
- Norman Malloy
- Walter Monson
- Kenneth Moore
- Romeo Rivers
- Harold Simpson
- Hugh Sutherland
- Stanley Wagner (goaltender)
- Alston Wise

== NHL alumni ==
List of Winnipeg Hockey Club alumni who played in the National Hockey League (NHL):

- Andy Blair
- Cecil Browne
- Rosie Couture
- Red Dutton
- Percy Galbraith
- Steamer Maxwell
- Sam McAdam
- Amby Moran
- Gus Rivers
- Jack Ruttan
- Emory Sparrow
- Wilfie Starr
- Hal Winkler

Preceded by University of Toronto Grads	Canada men's Olympic ice hockey team 1932	Succeeded by Port Arthur Bearcats
