= Jack Ruttan =

Canadian ice hockey player and coach (1889–1973)

- Hockey Hall of Fame, 1963
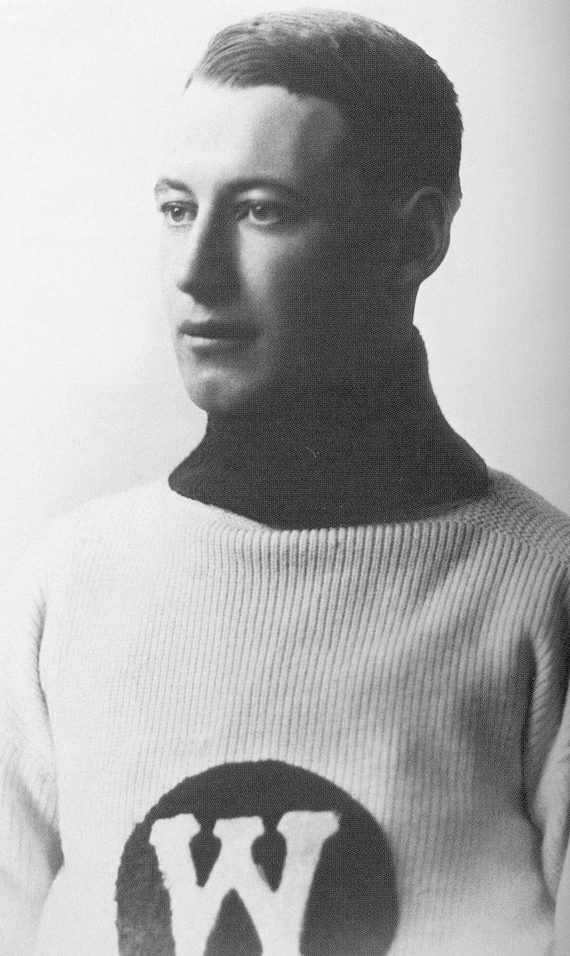
- Ruttan with the Winnipeg Hockey Club
- Born: April 5, 1889 Winnipeg, Manitoba, Canada
- Died: January 7, 1973 (aged 83) Winnipeg, Manitoba, Canada
- Height: 5 ft 8 in (173 cm)
- Position: Defence
- Played for: Winnipeg Hockey Club; Winnipeg Somme
- Playing career: 1905–1918

John Douglas Ruttan (April 5, 1889 – January 7, 1973) was a Canadian amateur ice hockey player and coach. Ruttan played for the Winnipeg Hockey Club and was a member of the 1913 Allan Cup championship team. He was inducted into the Hockey Hall of Fame in 1963.

== Playing career ==
Ruttan played juvenile hockey with the Winnipeg Armstrong's Point hockey team that won the Winnipeg juvenile championship of 1906. He switched to the Rustler club the following season which won the 1907 juvenile championship. The following season, Ruttan entered St. John's College (known today as the University of Manitoba and its team won the Manitoba University Hockey League championship. Ruttan moved up to senior hockey in 1909 and played for the Manitoba Varsity hockey team which won the championship of the Winnipeg Senior Hockey League in 1911. Ruttan moved on to play for the Winnipeg Hockey Club in 1912. That season Winnipeg won the Allan Cup as senior hockey champions of Canada.

Ruttan had served in the Canadian militia for five years prior to the outbreak of the First World War in 1914: three years with the 100th Winnipeg Grenadiers, and two with the 34th Fort Garry Horse. In April 1915, he enlisted with the 10th Regiment, Canadian Mounted Rifles. Promoted to captain, he did not serve on the front lines due to several health issues, including pharyngitis, appendicitis, anemia, and a duodenal ulcer.

Sent back to Canada in 1917, Ruttan helped organize the Winnipeg Military Hockey League for the 1917–18 season. Established to help the war effort, the three teams used names from recent battles: Somme, Vimy, and Ypres. Ruttan played one game with the Somme team, his last competitive match. In 1919, Ruttan became an ice hockey coach for the Winnipeg Hockey Club. From 1920 until 1922, he refereed in the Winnipeg League. Ruttan coached a season of the University of Manitoba in 1923–24.

== Awards and achievements ==
- Allan Cup Championship (1913)
- Inducted into the Hockey Hall of Fame in 1963
- Honoured Member of the Manitoba Hockey Hall of Fame

== Bibliography ==
- Hockey Hall of Fame (2003). Honoured Members: Hockey Hall of Fame. Bolton, Ontario: Fenn Publishing. ISBN 1-55168-239-7.
- MacLeod, Alan Livingstone (2018), From Rinks to Regiments: Hockey Hall-of-Famers and the Great War, Victoria, British Columbia: Heritage House, ISBN 978-1-77203-268-0
