= Stanisław Skupień =

Polish cross-country skier

Personal information
- Nationality: Polish
- Born: 26 April 1907 Zakopane, Austria-Hungary
- Died: 11 July 1983 (aged 76) Zakopane, Poland

Sport
- Sport: Cross-country skiing

Stanisław Skupień (26 April 1907 – 11 July 1983) was a Polish cross-country skier. He competed in the men's 18 kilometre event at the 1932 Winter Olympics.
