= Roman Sabiński =

Polish ice hockey player

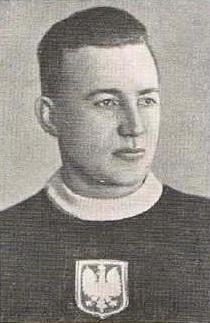
- Roman Sabiński
- Born: 28 December 1908 Lemberg, Austro-Hungarian Empire
- Died: 28 June 1978 (aged 69) Manchester, England, UK
- Height: 168 cm (5 ft 6 in)
- Position: Right wing
- Shot: Right
- Played for: Pogoń Lwów (1928-1939)
- National team: Poland
- Playing career: 1928–1939

Roman Zdzisław Jerzy Sabiński (28 December 1908 in Lemberg - 28 June 1978 in Manchester) was a Polish ice hockey player who competed in the 1932 Winter Olympics.

== Biography ==
In his youth, Sabińskiwas part of the Lviv Skating Society. He worked first as a member of the Municipal Citizen Guard, and then as an accountant for the state police. In 1932, he was a member of the Polish ice hockey team, which finished fourth in the Olympic tournament. He played all six matches. Throughout his career, he played a total of 35 games for Poland.

After World War II, in which he fought in the Polish Army, Sabiński emigrated to the United Kingdom, where he took on the name Norman. He died in Manchester in 1978.
