= Albert Mauer =

Polish ice hockey player

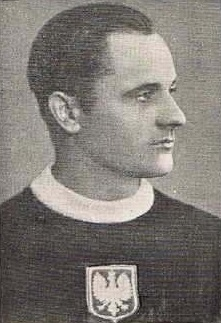
- Albert Mauer
- Born: 12 February 1907; Peuerbach, Austria-Hungary
- Died: 10 May 1999 (aged 92); Bytom, Poland
- Spouse: Eugenia Józefa Konopacka
- Children: 2
Association football career
- Position: Defender
Senior career*
Years	Team	Apps	(Gls)
1921–1931	Pogoń Lwów	83	
- * Club domestic league appearances and goals
Ice hockey career
- Height: 170 cm (5 ft 7 in)
- Weight: 68 kg (150 lb; 10 st 10 lb)
- Position: Defenseman
- Played for: Poland national team (1928–1932)
- National team: Poland
- Military career
- Allegiance: Poland
- Conflicts: World War II

Albert Mauer (12 February 1907 – 10 May 1999) was a Polish football and ice hockey player who competed in the 1932 Winter Olympics. After returning from forced labour in 1947, he was a tennis, hockey, and football coach for teams including Polonia Bytom, Start Katowice, Górnik Katowice, KS Baildon Katowice, and Chemik Kędzierzyn.

== Biography ==
Mauer was initially a footballer, playing for Pogoń Lwów youth and regular teams. He later began to focus on ice hockey, representing the Polish national team 14 times. In 1932, he was part of the team that finished fourth in the Olympic tournament. He played one match. During World War II, he was sent by Nazis to forced labour in Austria and was only permitted to return to Poland in 1947. From there, he focused on coaching tennis, hockey, and football.

== Honours ==
=== Football ===
Polonia Lwów

- Polish Football Championship: 1925
