= Włodzimierz Krygier =

Polish ice hockey player and footballer

Personal information
- Full name: Włodzimierz Lucjan Krygier
- Date of birth: 29 January 1900
- Place of birth: Ekaterinoslav, Russian Empire
- Date of death: 17 September 1975 (aged 75)
- Place of death: London, England
- Height: 1.69 m (5 ft 7 in)
- Position: Forward

Senior career*
| Years | Team | Apps | (Gls) |
| 1916 | Sitius Jekaterynosław | | |
| 1917 | Stadion Jekaterynosław | | |
| 1920–1923 | AZS Warsaw | | |
| 1923–1929 | Polonia Warsaw | 68 | (21) |

International career
| 1928 | Poland | 1 | (0) |
Ice hockey career
- Weight: 64 kg (141 lb; 10 st 1 lb)
- Position: Forward
- Played for: AZS Warsaw
- National team: Poland
- Playing career: 1922–1932
- * Club domestic league appearances and goals

Włodzimierz Lucjan Krygier (29 January 1900 – 17 September 1975) was a Polish ice hockey and football player. For hockey, he competed in the 1928 and 1932 Winter Olympics.

He was born in Yekaterinoslav, Russian Empire and died in London, Great Britain.

In 1928, he participated with the Poland ice hockey team at the Olympic tournament.

Four years later, he was a member of the Polish team which finished fourth at the 1932 Olympic tournament. He played five matches.

He fought in the September Campaign of World War II.
