= Kazimierz Materski =

Polish ice hockey player

- Born: 23 September 1906; Warsaw, Poland
- Died: 3 February 1971 (aged 64); Warsaw, Poland
Association football career
- Positions: Striker; midfielder
Senior career*
Years	Team	Apps	(Gls)
–1925	Orkan Warsaw		
1925–1928	Legia Warsaw	3	(0)
1929–1934	KS Warszawianka	73	(12)
- * Club domestic league appearances and goals
Ice hockey career
- Position: Centre
- Played for: Legia Warsaw (1928–1936); AZS Warsaw (1936–1939)
- National team: Poland
- Military career
- Allegiance: Poland
- Rank: Officer
- Conflicts: September Campaign (World War II)

Kazimierz Ładysław Materski (23 September 1906 – 3 February 1971) was a Polish professional football and ice hockey player who represented Poland in the 1932 Winter Olympics.

== Biography ==
Materski studied law at the University of Warsaw in 1932, then spent the next two years at the Communication Reserve Cadet School in Zegrze. He started as a professional footballer, playing for Legia Warsaw from 1925 and 1928 and KS Warszawianka from 1929 to 1934. He played ice hockey with Legia Warsaw from 1928 to 1936 and AZS Warsaw from 1936–37 and 1938–39, broken up by one season with Polonia Warsaw. He was on the Polish national team 28 times between 1931 and 1936 at the World Championships and as part of the 1932 Polish Olympic team, which finished fourth. He played all six matches at the Olympics.

He fought in the September Campaign of World War II and later served in the corps of General Władysław Anders. He did not return to sport after returning from war in 1947.
