= Czesław Marchewczyk =

Polish ice hockey player (1912–2003)

- Born: 1 October 1912 Kraków, Austria-Hungary
- Died: 10 November 2003 (aged 91) Krakow, Poland
- Height: 5 ft 7 in (170 cm)
- Weight: 157 lb (71 kg; 11 st 3 lb)
- Position: Left wing
- Played for: KS Cracovia
- National team: Poland
- Playing career: 1927–1949

Czesław Karol Marchewczyk (1 October 1912 – 10 November 2003) was a Polish ice hockey player.

== Career ==
Marchewczyk played for KS Cracovia during his career, as well as the Polish national team at several world championships and the 1932, 1936, and 1948 Winter Olympics. He was awarded the Knight's Cross of the Order of Polonia Restituta.
