= Alfred Heinrich (ice hockey) =

German ice hockey player

Personal information
- Born: 21 February 1906 Berlin, German Empire
- Died: 31 October 1975 (aged 68) West Berlin, West Germany

Sport
- Sport: Ice hockey
Medal record
Men's Ice hockey
| Bronze medal – third place | 1932 Lake Placid | Team competition |

Alfred Heinrich (21 February 1906 – 31 October 1975) was a German ice hockey player who competed in the 1932 Winter Olympics.

In 1932, he was a member of the German ice hockey team, which won the bronze medal. He played all six matches.
