= Erich Herker =

German ice hockey player

Olympic medal record

Men's Ice hockey
Bronze medal – third place	1932 Lake Placid	Team competition

Erich Otto Friedrich Herker (25 September 1905 in Belleben – 2 September 1990 in Berlin) was a German ice hockey player who competed in the 1932 Winter Olympics.

In 1932 he was a member of the German ice hockey team, which won the bronze medal. He played two matches and scored one goal.
