= Werner Korff =

German ice hockey player

Olympic medal record

Men's Ice hockey
Bronze medal – third place	1932 Lake Placid	Team competition

Werner Korff (18 December 1911 – 11 February 1999) was a German ice hockey player, born in Berlin, who competed in the 1932 Winter Olympics.

In 1932 he was a member of the German ice hockey team, which won the bronze medal. He played all six matches.
