= Georg Strobl =

German ice hockey player

Olympic medal record

Men's Ice hockey
Bronze medal – third place	1932 Lake Placid	Team competition

Georg Strobl (9 February 1910 in Munich - 10 May 1991) was a German ice hockey player who competed in the 1932 Winter Olympics and 1936 Winter Olympics.

In 1932, he was a member of the German ice hockey team that won the bronze medal. He played in all six matches and scored one goal.

Four years later, he was again a member of the German ice hockey team, which finished in fifth place. He played in three matches and scored one goal.
