= Walter Leinweber =

German ice hockey player

Olympic medal record

Men's Ice hockey
Bronze medal – third place	1932 Lake Placid	Team Competition

Walter Leinweber (18 April 1907 in Füssen – 2 March 1997) was a German ice hockey player who competed in the 1932 Winter Olympics. In 1932 he was a member of the German ice hockey team, which won the bronze medal. He played all six matches as goalkeeper.
