= Martin Schröttle =

German ice hockey player

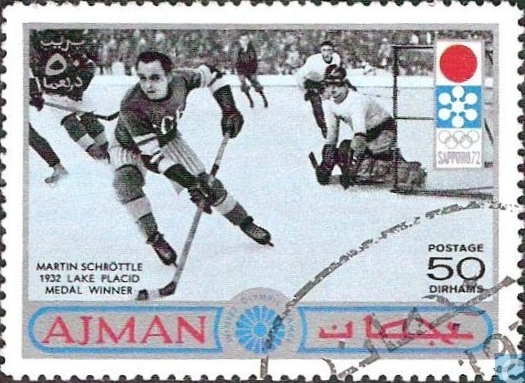

Personal information
- Born: 1 September 1901 Munich, Germany
- Died: 17 February 1972 (aged 70) Munich, West Germany

Sport
- Sport: Ice hockey
- Club: SC Riessersee; Garmisch-Partenkirchen
Medal record
Representing Germany
Olympic Games
Bronze medal – third place	1932 Lake Placid	Team competition

Martin Schröttle (1 September 1901 – 17 February 1972) was a German ice hockey player who competed in the 1928 Winter Olympics and 1932 Winter Olympics.

In 1928 he was a member of the German ice hockey team, which placed last in his preliminary group of the Olympic tournament and did not advance. Four years later his team won the bronze medal.

Schröttle was a European champion in 1930 and German champion in 1927, 1935 and 1938. He scored 8 goals in his 37 international matches. He was later inducted into the German Ice Hockey Hall of Fame. In 1955 he co-wrote the book Eishockey in Wort und Bild.
