= Norman Malloy =

Canadian ice hockey player

Olympic medal record

Men's ice hockey

Representing Canada
Gold medal – first place	1932 Lake Placid	Team competition

Joseph Norman Malloy (September 27, 1913 – December 16, 1964) was a Canadian ice hockey player who competed in the 1932 Winter Olympics.

He was born in Kinkora, Ontario.

In 1932 he was a member of the Winnipeg Hockey Club, the Canadian team which won the gold medal. He played five matches and scored three goals.
