= Joseph Fitzgerald (ice hockey) =

American ice hockey player

Medal record

Men's Ice hockey

Representing the United States
Silver medal – second place	1932 Lake Placid	Team competition

Joseph Francis Fitzgerald (October 10, 1904 – March 20, 1987) was an American ice hockey player who competed in the 1932 Winter Olympics.

He was born in Brighton, Massachusetts and died in Needham, Massachusetts. He played football, baseball and hockey for Boston College, graduating in 1928. In the summer of 1926, he played for the Hyannis town team in the Cape Cod Baseball League.

In 1932 he was a member of the American ice hockey team, which won the silver medal. He played one match.
