= John Cookman =

American ice hockey player (1909–1982)

Medal record

Men's ice hockey

Representing United States

Olympic Games
Silver medal – second place	1932 Lake Placid	Team competition

John Emory Cookman (September 2, 1909 – August 19, 1982) was an American ice hockey player who competed in the 1932 Winter Olympics, playing five matches and scoring two goals. The American ice hockey team won the silver medal that year. He graduated from Yale in 1931, and later became the CFO of Philip Morris USA.

He was born in Englewood, New Jersey and died in Plattsburgh, New York.
