= Robert Livingston (ice hockey) =

American ice hockey player

Personal information
- Born: Robert Cambridge Livingston; November 3, 1908 Lawrence, New York, US
- Died: April 2, 1974 (aged 65) New Canaan, Connecticut, US
- Education: St. Paul's School; Princeton University
- Spouse: Joan Ordway (m. 1942)
- Children: 4
- Relative: See Livingston family
Medal record
Men's Ice hockey
Representing the United States
Olympic Games
Silver medal – second place	1932 Lake Placid	Team competition

Robert Cambridge Livingston (November 3, 1908 – April 2, 1974) was an American ice hockey player who competed in the 1932 Winter Olympics.

== Early life ==
Livingston was born in Lawrence, New York on November 3, 1908 and was named after his paternal grandfather. He was a son of Clara Miller (née Dudley) Livingston and John Griswold Livingston (1872–1961). Among his siblings was brothers John G. Livingston Jr. and William Dudley Livingston. His father was the founder and president of J. Livingston & Co., electrical contractors in New York and the first civil governor of the province of Sorsogon in the Philippines in 1902.

His paternal grandparents were Robert Cambridge Livingston and Maria (née Whitney) Livingston (a granddaughter of merchant Stephen Whitney). His aunt, Maud Maria Livingston, was married to Henry Worthington Bull (a son of William L. Bull). He was a direct descendant of Philip Livingston, one of the signers of the Declaration of Independence, and Robert Livingston the Elder, the 1st Lord of Livingston Manor. His maternal grandparents were William Dudley and Maria (née Hunt) Dudley of Lexington, Kentucky.

He attended St. Paul's School in Concord, New Hampshire before Princeton University where he was captain of the Princeton hockey team and a member of Cap and Gown Club. He graduated from Princeton in 1931.

== Career ==
The year after his graduation from Princeton, he was a member of the American ice hockey team in 1932, which won the silver medal. He played one match.

For twelve years, he was a representative of the Grace Line in Peru and served four years as a Lieutenant commander in the U.S. Navy.

Livingston served as president of International Instruments, Inc. until 1969 when it was acquired by Sigma Instruments of Boston. He served on the board of the new firm which manufactured electronic components and devices.

== Personal life ==
On February 21, 1942, Livingston was married to Joan "Muguet" Ordway (1918–2018) in the chapel of St. George's Episcopal Church in Stuyvesant Square in Manhattan, with a reception at the Cosmopolitan Club. Joan, a graduate of the Chapin School and a member of the Junior League who made her debut in 1937, was a daughter of Samuel Gilman Ordway of 25 East End Avenue and East Hampton. Among her family was grandfather Lucius Pond Ordway (a founder of what became 3M) and great-grandfather John M. Gilman (who served in the Ohio and Minnesota House of Representatives). Together, they lived at 969 Park Avenue were the parents of four children, two girls and two boys, including:

- Robert Cambridge "Chico" Livingston Jr. (b. 1943), a doctor.
- Patricia Pond Livingston, who married Victor Conrad Stumpf III in 1969. She later married the artist Tom Gottsleben.
- Philip Livingston, a doctor who married Dr. Lucy Hann.
- Mildred Dudley "Millie" Livingston (b. 1955),

Livingston died at his home in New Canaan, Connecticut on April 2, 1974. After his death, his widow remarried to Richard Burr Tweedy, a former director of the Stamford Hospital and president of the Stamford Bar Association in 1982, before her death on December 22, 2018 at 100 years of age.
