= Gerard Hallock =

American ice hockey player

Medal record

Men's ice hockey

Representing the United States

Olympic Games
Silver medal – second place	1932 Lake Placid	Team competition

Gerard "Buzz" Hallock III (June 14, 1905 – May 26, 1996) was an American ice hockey player who competed in the 1932 Winter Olympics.

Born in Pottstown, Pennsylvania, in 1932 he was a member of the American ice hockey team, which won the silver medal. He played one match.

He died in Essex, Connecticut.
