= Edwin Frazier =

American ice hockey player

Medal record

Men's ice hockey

Representing United States

Olympic Games
Silver medal – second place	1932 Lake Placid	Team competition

Edwin Hartwell Frazier (May 5, 1907 – November 2, 1971) was an American ice hockey player who competed in the 1932 Winter Olympics as a goaltender. The team won the silver medal.

Frazier was born in Stoneham, Massachusetts, and died in Wilmington, Massachusetts.
