= Osborne Anderson =

American ice hockey player

- Born: October 15, 1908 Fredrikstad, Norway
- Died: January 31, 1989 (aged 80) Lynn, Massachusetts, U.S
- Height: 5 ft 9 in (175 cm)
- Weight: 170 lb (77 kg; 12 st 2 lb)
- Position: Defense
- Shot: Left
- Played for: Atlantic City Sea Gulls; Boston Olympics
- National team: United States
- Playing career: 1931–1947

Osborn "Ty" Anderson (October 15, 1908 – January 31, 1989) was an American ice hockey player who competed in the 1932 Winter Olympics.

In 1932, he was a member of the American ice hockey team, which won the silver medal. He played all six matches and scored one goal.

== Life and times ==
=== Early years ===
Ty Anderson was born in Norway and immigrated to Swampscott, Massachusetts with his parents at an early age. Anderson was an accomplished athlete as a young man standing out as the quarterback for the high school football team and as shortstop for the baseball team in addition to his accomplishments as a hockey player for Swampscott High School. It was his skills as a hockey player that allowed him to play for the Boston Hockey Club (a precursor to the EAHL's Boston Olympics.) and the United States National team.

=== Playing career ===
Medal record

Men's ice hockey

Representing the United States

Olympic Games
Silver medal – second place	1932 Lake Placid	Team competition

Anderson first played for the United States at the 1931 World Championships, winning his first international Medal. Team USA only lost a single game in the tournament, being shut out by Canada 2-0, giving the Americans second place and the Silver Medal. The next year Anderson represented the United States at the Olympic Games, where Team USA fell short against the Canadians again, giving Anderson his second Silver Medal, and lone Olympic Medal. After the Olympics, Anderson joined the Atlantic City Sea Gulls in the Tri-State Hockey league. The TSHL became the Eastern Amateur Hockey League for the 1933-1934 seasons and though it was a sort of minor league for the NHL, Anderson preferred to stay in the EAHL and remained there for 15 years. Anderson gained a reputation as one of the most gentlemanly players in the EAHL, averaging only 11 penalty minutes per season. He was so respected in the league that on March 9, 1941, he received a gold watch for his EAHL services on what was called "Ty Anderson Day", an event that was held by the New York Rovers while Anderson was a member of the visiting Boston Olympics.

=== Later life ===
After his playing career, Anderson moved back to Swampscott and became the high school's ice hockey head coach. Anderson coached the team from 1948 to 1972, leading them to three North Shore League championships (1958, 1959 and 1963). In the summers Anderson worked as a local golf pro. On January 31, 1989 at the age of 80, Ty Anderson died of pancreatic cancer in a medical center located in Lynn, Massachusetts.

== Career statistics ==
=== Regular season and playoffs ===
			Regular season					Playoffs
Season	Team	League	GP	G	A	Pts	PIM	GP	G	A	Pts	PIM
1929–30	Boston Hockey Club	Ind	—	—	—	—	—	—	—	—	—	—
1930–31	Boston Hockey Club	Ind	—	—	—	—	—	—	—	—	—	—
1931–32	Boston Hockey Club	Ind	—	—	—	—	—	—	—	—	—	—
1932–33	Atlantic City Sea Gulls	EAHL	15	2	5	7	6	3	0	0	0	0
1933–34	Atlantic City Sea Gulls	EAHL	16	3	6	9	2	4	0	2	2	0
1934–35	Atlantic City Sea Gulls	EAHL	21	2	0	2	4	10	1	0	1	6
1935–36	Atlantic City Sea Gulls	EAHL	39	6	3	9	10	8	1	1	2	0
1936–37	Atlantic City Sea Gulls	EAHL	47	6	12	18	8	4	0	0	0	2
1937–38	Atlantic City Sea Gulls	EAHL	57	5	7	12	26	—	—	—	—	—
1938–39	Atlantic City Sea Gulls	EAHL	53	6	15	21	2	—	—	—	—	—
1939–40	Boston Olympics	QPHL	35	1	3	4	6	5	0	1	1	0
1940–41	Boston Olympics	EAHL	65	7	14	21	12	3	0	0	0	0
1941–42	Boston Olympics	EAHL	58	12	13	25	27	8	1	2	3	0
1942–43	Boston Olympics	EAHL	38	7	19	26	36	8	2	2	4	4
1943–44	Boston Olympics	EAHL	38	3	21	24	4	8	1	5	6	@
1944–45	Boston Olympics	EAHL	38	10	19	29	0	10	0	2	2	0
1945–46	Boston Olympics	EAHL	41	1	11	12	6	12	1	0	1	0
1946–47	Boston Olympics	EAHL	37	0	1	1	4	9	0	0	0	0
EAHL totals			563	70	146	216	147	87	7	14	21	14

=== International ===
Year	Team	Event	GP	G	A	Pts	PIM
1931	United States	WC	6	3	0	3	0
1932	United States	OLY	6	1	1	2	5
Senior totals			12	4	1	5	5
