= Ice hockey at the 1932 Winter Olympics =

Tournament details
- Host country: United States
- Venues: 2 venues in Lake Placid (indoors and outdoors)
- Dates: 4–13 February 1932
- Teams: 4

Final positions
- Champions: Canada (4th title)
- Runners-up: United States
- Third place: Germany
- Fourth place: Poland

Tournament statistics
- Games played: 12
- Goals scored: 69 (5.75 per game)
- Scoring leader: (Canada) Walter Monson (11 points)

The men's ice hockey tournament at the 1932 Winter Olympics in Lake Placid, United States, was the fourth Olympic Championship, also serving as the sixth World Championships. Canada, represented by the Winnipeg Hockey Club, won its fourth consecutive Olympic gold medal and sixth consecutive World Championship. The United States secured the silver medal and Germany claimed one of its three all-time hockey medals by taking the bronze (West Germany would win a bronze medal in 1976, and Germany's men's team would win silver in 2018). Overall, four teams participated, with only two European associations (Germany and Poland) making the trip due to the worldwide Great Depression. The other European teams instead played at the 1932 European Championship.

== Medalists ==
Gold	Silver	Bronze
Canada William Cockburn; Clifford Crowley; Albert Duncanson; George Garbutt; Roy Henkel; Vic Lindquist; Norman Malloy; Walter Monson; Kenneth Moore; Romeo Rivers; Hack Simpson; Hugh Sutherland; Stanley Wagner; Alston Wise	United States Osborne Anderson; Johnny Bent; John Chase; John Cookman; Douglas Everett; Franklin Farrell; Joseph Fitzgerald; Edwin Frazier; John Garrison; Gerard Hallock; Robert Livingston; Francis Nelson; Winthrop Palmer; Gordon Smith	Germany Rudi Ball; Alfred Heinrich; Erich Herker; Gustav Jaenecke; Werner Korff; Walter Leinweber; Erich Römer; Martin Schröttle; Marquardt Slevogt; Georg Strobl

== Participating nations ==
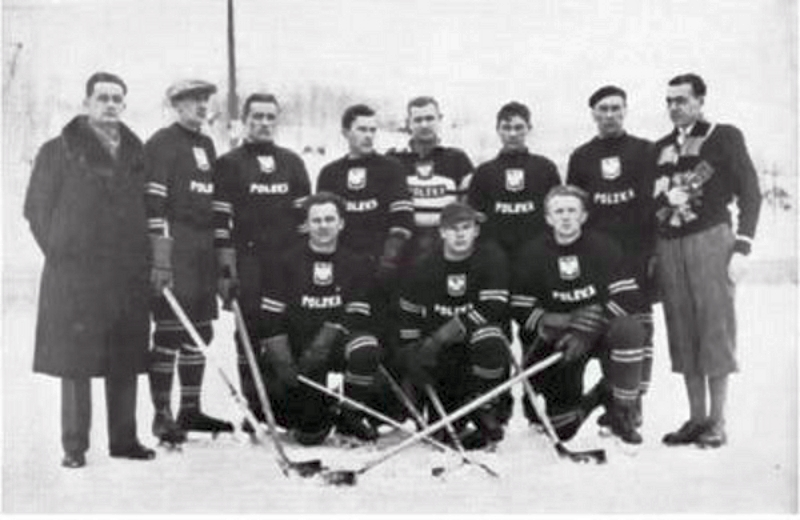
The Polish national team during the Olympics.

A total of 48(*) ice hockey players from four nations competed at the Lake Placid Games:

- Canada (14)
- Germany (10)
- Poland (10)
- United States (14)

(*) NOTE: Only players who participated in at least one game are counted.

== Final tournament ==
Pos	Team	Pld	W	D	L	GF	GA	GD	Pts
1	Canada	6	5	1	0	32	4	+28	11
2	United States	6	4	1	1	27	5	+22	9
3	Germany	6	2	0	4	7	26	−19	4
4	Poland	6	0	0	6	3	34	−31	0

Source: HockeyCanada.ca

Date		Result		P1	P2	P3	OT1	OT2	OT3	Stadium
04 Feb	Canada	2 - 1	United States	0 - 0	1 - 0	0 - 1	0 - 0	1 - 0		Lake Placid Rink, Lake Placid
04 Feb	Germany	2 - 1	Poland	0 - 0	1 - 1	1 - 0				Lake Placid Rink, Lake Placid
05 Feb	United States	4 - 1	Poland	1 - 0	2 - 0	1 - 1				Lake Placid Rink, Lake Placid
06 Feb	Canada	4 - 1	Germany	2 - 0	2 - 0	0 - 1				Lake Placid Rink, Lake Placid
07 Feb	Canada	9 - 0	Poland	2 - 0	5 - 0	2 - 0				Olympic Arena, Lake Placid
07 Feb	United States	7 - 0	Germany	3 - 0	2 - 0	2 - 0				Olympic Arena, Lake Placid
08 Feb	United States	5 - 0	Poland	1 - 0	1 - 0	3 - 0				Lake Placid Rink, Lake Placid
08 Feb	Canada	5 - 0	Germany	2 - 0	1 - 0	2 - 0				Olympic Arena, Lake Placid
09 Feb	Canada	10 - 0	Poland	5 - 0	1 - 0	4 - 0				Lake Placid Rink, Lake Placid
10 Feb	United States	8 - 0	Germany	2 - 0	2 - 0	4 - 0				Olympic Arena, Lake Placid
13 Feb	Germany	4 - 1	Poland	0 - 0	2 - 1	2 - 0				Olympic Arena, Lake Placid
13 Feb	Canada	2 - 2	United States	1 - 1	0 - 1	1 - 0	0 - 0	0 - 0	0 - 0	Olympic Arena, Lake Placid

== Statistics ==
=== Average age ===
Team Germany was the oldest team in the tournament, averaging 25 years and 6 months. Gold medalists team Canada was the youngest team in the tournament, averaging 24 years and 5 months. Tournament average was 24 years and 9 months.

=== Top scorer ===
Team	GP	G	A	Pts
(Canada) Walter Monson	6	7	4	11

== Final ranking ==
1	Canada
2	United States
3	Germany
4	Poland
