= Francis Nelson (ice hockey, born 1910) =

American ice hockey player

Personal information
- Born: January 24, 1910 New York City, U.S.
- Died: March 9, 1973 (aged 63) Montclair, New Jersey, U.S.
Medal record
Men's Ice hockey
Representing the United States
Olympic Games
Silver medal – second place	1932 Lake Placid	Team competition

Francis Augustus Nelson, Jr. (January 24, 1910 – March 9, 1973) was an American ice hockey player who competed in the 1932 Winter Olympics. He was born in New York City, New York and died in Montclair, New Jersey.

In 1932 he was a member of the United States ice hockey team, who won the silver medal. He played five games in which he scored one goal.
