= Douglas Everett (ice hockey) =

American ice hockey player (1905–1996)

Medal record

Men's ice hockey

Representing the United States

Olympic Games
Silver medal – second place	1932 Lake Placid	Team competition

Douglas Newton Everett (April 3, 1905 – September 14, 1996) was an American ice hockey player. He was a star for the Dartmouth College hockey team in 1922-26 and a member of Sigma Chi Fraternity. After graduating, Everett received professional offers from the Boston Bruins, New York Rangers and Toronto Maple Leafs of the National Hockey League but opted to pursue a career in the insurance business in Concord, New Hampshire instead while continuing to play amateur hockey.

Everett competed in the 1932 Winter Olympics as a member of the American ice hockey team, which won the silver medal. He played five matches and scored four goals. He was inducted into the United States Hockey Hall of Fame in 1974.

He was born in Cambridge, Massachusetts, United States, and died in Concord, New Hampshire.
