= William Cockburn (ice hockey) =

Canadian ice hockey player (1902–1975)

Personal information
- Born: March 1, 1902 Toronto, Ontario, Canada
- Died: March 21, 1975 (aged 73) Winnipeg, Manitoba, Canada
Medal record
Men's ice hockey Competitor for Canada
Gold medal – first place	1932 Lake Placid	Team competition

William George Cockburn (March 1, 1902 – March 21, 1975) was a Canadian ice hockey player who competed in the 1932 Winter Olympics. He later became a coach in the Winnipeg area.

== Early life ==
Cockburn was born in Toronto, Ontario and grew up in Winnipeg, Manitoba. He played junior hockey for the Winnipeg Tigers from 1918 to 1922. In 1922, he graduated to senior hockey with the Winnipeg Tammany Tigers. He played until 1926 with several Winnipeg senior teams.

== Career ==
In 1926, Cockburn moved to Montreal, Quebec, where he worked as a grain merchant. Cockburn played for various senior teams in Montreal, including the Montreal Victorias which went to the 1928 Allan Cup final. In 1928, Cockburn return to Winnipeg. He played the next four seasons of senior hockey, including the Winnipeg Hockey Club, which won the 1931 Allan Cup. As Allan Cup champions, the team was selected to represent Canada at the 1932 Winter Olympics. The club won the gold medal for Canada. He played five matches as goaltender. Cockburn retired from ice hockey after the Olympics, though he is recorded as playing the occasional game. He became an ice hockey coach in the Winnipeg area.

== Awards and achievements ==
- Allan Cup Championship (1931)
- Honoured Member of the Manitoba Hockey Hall of Fame
