= Walter Monson =

Canadian ice hockey player

- Born: November 29, 1908 Winnipeg, Manitoba, Canada
- Died: January 9, 1988 (aged 79) Winnipeg, Manitoba, Canada
- Position: Centre
- Played for: Harringay Racers
- National team: Canada
- Playing career: 1936–1940

Olympic medal record

Men's ice hockey

Representing Canada
Gold medal – first place	1932 Lake Placid	Team competition

Walter George "Wally, Pop" Monson (November 29, 1908 – January 9, 1988) was a Canadian ice hockey player who competed in the 1932 Winter Olympics.

In 1932 he was a member of the Winnipeg Hockey Club, which won the Olympic gold medal for Canada. He played all six matches and scored seven goals.

After playing amateur ice hockey with the Saint John Beavers and the Pittsburgh Yellow Jackets, Monson went to the United Kingdom to play professional ice hockey with the Harringay Racers between 1936 and 1940. After World War II, Monson returned to Winnipeg where he coached the Winnipeg Monarchs to the Memorial Cup in 1946.

He was inducted into the British Ice Hockey Hall of Fame in 1955.

== Awards and achievements ==
- Olympic Gold Metalist (1932)
- MJHL First All-Star Team Coach (1953)
- Inducted into the British Ice Hockey Hall of Fame in 1955
- Honoured Member of the Manitoba Hockey Hall of Fame
