= Vic Lindquist =

Canadian ice hockey player

Personal information
- Born: March 22, 1908 Gold Rock, Ontario
- Died: November 30, 1983 (aged 75) St. Vital, Winnipeg
Medal record
Men's ice hockey
Representing Canada
Gold medal – first place	1932 Lake Placid	Team

Victor Carl Lindquist (March 22, 1908 – November 30, 1983) was a Canadian ice hockey player who competed in the 1932 Winter Olympics. Lindquist was born in Gold Rock, Ontario.

Lindquist led the Winnipeg Hockey Club, the Canadian team which won the gold medal at the 1932 Winter Olympics. He played five matches and scored three goals.

He was inducted into the International Ice Hockey Federation Hall of Fame in 1997. He has been inducted into the North Western Ontario Sports Hall of Fame. He coached Sweden at the 1936 Winter Olympics.

Lindquist was nominated by Canadian Amateur Hockey Association president Jack Roxburgh to represent Canada as a referee at the 1962 Ice Hockey World Championships.

== Awards and achievements ==
- Allan Cup Championship (1931)
- Olympic Gold Medalist (1932)
- World Championship Gold Medalist (1935)
- Inducted into the IIHF Hall of Fame in 1997
- Inducted into the Manitoba Sports Hall of Fame and Museum in 2004
- Honoured Member of the Manitoba Hockey Hall of Fame
