= Clifford Crowley =

Canadian ice hockey player (1906–1948)

- Born: June 13, 1906 Winnipeg, Manitoba, Canada
- Died: April 27, 1948 (aged 41) Winnipeg, Manitoba, Canada
- Height: 5 ft 9 in (175 cm)
- Weight: 160 lb (73 kg; 11 st 6 lb)
- Position: Left Wing
- Shoots: Left
- Played for: Winnipeg Hockey Club (1932)
- National team: Canada
Medal record
Men's ice hockey Competitor for Canada
Gold medal – first place	1932 Lake Placid	Team competition

Clifford Thomas Crowley (June 13, 1906 – April 27, 1948) was a Canadian ice hockey player who competed in the 1932 Winter Olympics.

He was born in and died in Winnipeg, Manitoba.

In 1932 he was a member of the Winnipeg Hockey Club, the Canadian team which won the gold medal. He played one match.
