= Hugh Sutherland (ice hockey) =

Canadian ice hockey player

Personal information
- Born: Hugh Robert Sutherland; February 2, 1907 Winnipeg, Manitoba, Canada
- Died: September 9, 1990 (aged 83)

Sport
- Sport: Ice hockey
- Team: Winnipeg Hockey Club
Medal record
Men's ice hockey
Representing Canada
Gold medal – first place	1932 Lake Placid	Team competition

Hugh Robert Sutherland (February 2, 1907 – September 9, 1990) was a Canadian ice hockey player who competed in the 1932 Winter Olympics. He was born in Winnipeg, Manitoba.

In 1932, Sutherland was a member of the Winnipeg Hockey Club, which won the World Championships and Olympic gold medal for Canada. He played all six matches and scored one goal.
