= Romeo Rivers =

Canadian ice hockey player

Olympic medal record

Men's ice hockey

Representing Canada
Gold medal – first place	1932 Lake Placid	Team competition

Norman Romeo Rivers (March 28, 1907 – May 4, 1986) was a Canadian ice hockey player who competed in the 1932 Winter Olympics.

He was born in Winnipeg, Manitoba.

In 1932 he was a member of the Winnipeg Hockey Club, the Canadian team which won the gold medal. He played all six matches and scored five goals.

== Awards and achievements ==
- Allan Cup Championship (1931)
- Olympic Gold Metalist (1932)
- World Championship Gold Medalist (1935)
- Honoured Member of the Manitoba Hockey Hall of Fame
