= George Garbutt =

Canadian ice hockey player

Olympic medal record

Men's ice hockey

Representing Canada
Gold medal – first place	1932 Lake Placid	Team competition

George Frederick "Tic" Garbutt (June 18, 1903 – September 21, 1967) was a Canadian ice hockey player who competed in the 1932 Winter Olympics.

In 1932 he was a member of the Winnipeg Hockey Club, the Canadian team that won the gold medal. He played one match and scored one goal.

Garbutt was also a member of the Winnipeg Grads club that represented Canada at the 1931 IIHF world championship tournament in Poland. Canada, in a thoroughly dominant performance, won the gold medal. The Canadians went undefeated in their six games and outscored their opponents by an aggregate of 24–0. (Sweden managed a 0–0 tie versus the Canadians to deprive Canada of a perfect record.)

He is buried in Brookside Cemetery in Winnipeg.
