= Stanley Wagner (ice hockey) =

Canadian ice hockey player

- Born: March 2, 1908 Pueblo, Colorado, U.S.
- Died: October 11, 2002 (aged 94) Winnipeg, Manitoba, Canada
- Position: Goaltender
- Played for: Winnipeg Hockey Club
Medal record
Men's ice hockey
Representing Canada
Gold medal – first place	1932 Lake Placid	Team competition

Ulysses Stanley Wagner (March 2, 1908 – October 11, 2002) was an American-born Canadian ice hockey player who competed in the 1932 Winter Olympics.

== Early life and education ==
The son of Canadian parents, Wagner was born in Pueblo, Colorado, in 1908. His parents had briefly moved to Colorado with the hope that the climate would cure his father’s tuberculosis. After his birth, Wagner's parents returned to Plum Coulee in Manitoba, and his father died of consumption when he was eight months old. Wagner played hockey as a child and studied accounting at the University of Manitoba for one year.

== Career ==
In 1932, he was a member of the Winnipeg Hockey Club, the Canadian team that won the gold medal at the 1932 Winter Olympics in Lake Placid, New York. He played one match as goaltender. Wagner became a pilot in 1934. During his career, he flew for Canadian Airways and Northern Air.
