= Alston Wise =

Canadian ice hockey player

Olympic medal record

Men's ice hockey

Representing Canada
| Gold medal – first place | 1932 Lake Placid | Team |

Joseph Alston "Stoney" Wise (October 29, 1904 – September 23, 1984) was a Canadian ice hockey player who competed in the 1932 Winter Olympics.

In 1932 Wise was a member of the Winnipeg Hockey Club which won the World Championships and Olympic gold medal for Canada. He played five matches and scored two goal.
