= Roy Henkel =

Canadian ice hockey player

- Born: Reinhold Henkel; August 22, 1905; Briesen, German Empire (present-day Poland)
- Died: October 6, 1981 (aged 76); Vancouver, British Columbia, Canada
Ice hockey career
- Played for: Winnipeg Hockey Club (1932)
- National team: Canada
Medal record
Men's ice hockey
Representing Canada
Gold medal – first place	1932 Lake Placid	Team

Reinhold "Roy" Henkel (Note: Most sources spell his surname "Hinkel", but his listing in the British Columbia Death Index, death certificate, as well as the obituaries for him and his father, spell it "Henkel".) (August 22, 1905 in Briesen, German Empire – October 6, 1981 in Vancouver) was a Canadian ice hockey player who competed in the 1932 Winter Olympics.

== Career ==
In 1932 Henkel was a member of the Winnipeg Hockey Club which won the World Championships and Olympic gold medal for Canada. He played all six matches and scored two goals. He played with the Winnipeg Monarchs through 1935, when the team won the World Championships. He was inducted into the Manitoba Sports Hall of Fame in 2004 for being part of the Winnipeg Hockey Club roster that won the 1931 championship.
