= Kenneth Moore (ice hockey) =

Canadian ice hockey player

- Born: February 17, 1910 Balcarres, Saskatchewan, Canada
- Died: December 8, 1981 (aged 71) Winnipeg, Manitoba, Canada
- Position: Right wing
- Shoots: Right
- Played for: Winnipeg Hockey Club Kimberley Dynamiters
- Coached for: St. Boniface Athletics St. James Canadiens
Medal record
Men's ice hockey
Representing Canada
Gold medal – first place	1932 Lake Placid	Team

Kenneth Strath Moore (February 17, 1910 – December 8, 1981) was a Canadian ice hockey player who competed in the 1932 Winter Olympics, winning gold. He was the first First Nations athlete to win an Olympic Gold Medal at the Winter Olympics.

== Biography ==
Moore was born in Balcarres, Saskatchewan, Canada in 1910 to James Linklater Moore and Edith Gibson. He was a citizen of the Peepeekisis Cree Nation. His two older brothers were taken from the family and forced to attend the Brandon Indian Residential School, over 330km away from their home. His eldest brother Oliver died in a sanatorium after falling ill at the school, and his brother Chester died there. Moore's family moved to Regina to prevent their other children from being taken to a residential school.

Moore played hockey, baseball, lacrosse, rugby, basketball, speed skating, and cycling, but loved hockey the most. Playing for the Regina Junior Hockey Association, he was awarded the Eilers' Medal for the player who demonstrated the best sportsmanship.

Moore received scholarships from American universities, but instead attended Region College and Campion College in Regina on scholarship. This was at a time when few First Nations students were accepted into higher education. He captained varsity hockey and rugby teams, along with playing baseball and basketball and was described as "the most versatile athlete".

Moore signed to play with the Regina Pats of the junior level Western Hockey League. He won the Canadian Junior Hockey Championship in 1930, scoring the game winning goal in the Memorial Cup with 40 seconds left to play. He then moved to a senior-level amateur team, the Winnipeg Hockey Club. They won the 1931 national championship, the Allan Cup. The team, known as the Winnipegs, were chosen to represent Canada at the 1932 Olympics.

In the 1932 Olympics, Moore played one game, in which he scored a goal against Poland in a 10-0 victory. He received a gold medal. His participation meant he was the first indigenous athlete to represent Canada at a Winter Olympics, and the first to win an Olympic Gold. The Winnipegs were later inducted into the Manitoba Sports Hall of Fame and the Manitoba Hockey Hall of Fame.

Following the Olympics, Moore played for the Kimberley Dynamiters. He won a second Allen Cup with the team in 1936. He assisted on the winning overtime goal to defeat the Sudbury Falcons. It was the first time a British Columbia team won the Allen Cup. They were later inducted into the British Columbia Sports Hall of Fame.

After retiring due to a badly broken arm, Moore became a coach. He coached the St. Boniface Athletics to the 1942 and 1943 Manitoba Amateur Hockey Association’s Junior North Division championships. In 1944, he coached the St. James Canadiens, who won the Junior South championship and the Manitoba Provincial Junior Hockey championship. He also served on the board of the Manitoba Amateur Hockey Association.

Beginning in the 1950s, Moore continued to volunteer with minor hockey. He worked for the City of Winnipeg as a fire alarm operator.

Moore married Edith Mae McDougall. They had a daughter, two granddaughters, and a great-grandson. He died at age 71 in Winnipeg and is buried at Elmwood Cemetery.

== Legacy ==
Moore's granddaughter Jennifer Moore Rattray found his 1932 gold medal and his Olympics jersey. She nominated Moore for induction in the Canada Sports Hall of Fame twice, but both nominations were unsuccessful. In 2015, Canada's Sports Hall of Fame inducted Shirley and Sharon Firth, claiming that they were the first Indigenous athletes to represent Canada at the Winter Olympics. Rattray contacted the Hall of Fame, and they specified that the sisters were the first Inuit athletes to hold the honor -- but they were actually Dinjii Zhuh.

Rattray and Stacy Dainard created the Kenneth Strath Moore Award endowment in 2024 to celebrate Moore's legacy. The endowment generates an annual scholarship for first-year students at the First Nations University of Canada.

Moore was inducted into the North American Indigenous Athletics Hall of Fame in 2024. He also featured in a 2018 museum exhibit at the Manitoba Museum. He is recognized in both the Manitoba Sports Hall of Fame, the Manitoba Hockey Hall of Fame, and British Columbia Sports Hall of Fame.
