= Hack Simpson =

Canadian ice hockey player

Medal record

Men's ice hockey

Representing Canada

Olympic Games
Gold medal – first place	1932 Lake Placid	Team competition

Harold Alfred "Hack" Simpson (June 26, 1910 – March 30, 1978) was a Canadian ice hockey player who competed in the 1932 Winter Olympics. He was born in Winnipeg. In 1932 he was a member of the Canadian ice hockey team, which won the gold medal. He played in five matches and scored six goals.
