= Sweden at the 1952 Winter Olympics =

- IOC code: SWE
- NOC: Swedish Olympic Committee
- Website: www.sok.se (in Swedish and English)

in Oslo
- Competitors: 65 (55 men, 9 women) in 8 sports
- Flag bearer: Erik Elmsäter (Nordic combined)
- Medals Ranked 10th: Gold 0 Silver 0 Bronze 4 Total 4

Winter Olympics appearances (overview)
- 1924; 1928; 1932; 1936; 1948; 1952; 1956; 1960; 1964; 1968; 1972; 1976; 1980; 1984; 1988; 1992; 1994; 1998; 2002; 2006; 2010; 2014; 2018; 2022; 2026

Sweden competed at the 1952 Winter Olympics in Oslo, Norway.

== Medalists ==
Medal	Name	Sport	Event
Bronze	Nils Täpp; Sigurd Andersson; Enar Josefsson; Martin Lundström	Cross-country skiing	Men's 4 × 10 km relay
Bronze	Sweden men's national ice hockey team: Göte Almqvist; Hans Andersson; Stig Andersson; Åke Andersson; Lasse Björn; Göte Blomqvist; Thord Flodqvist; Erik Johansson; Gösta Johansson; Rune Johansson; Sven "Tumba" Johansson; Åke Lassas; Holger Nurmela; Lars Pettersson; Lars Svensson; Sven Thunman; Hans Öberg	Ice hockey	Men's competition
Bronze	Karl Holmström	Ski jumping	Men's normal hill
Bronze	Carl-Erik Asplund	Speed skating	Men's 10 000 m

== Alpine skiing ==
Men

Athlete	Event	Race 1		Race 2		Total	
Athlete	Event	Time	Rank	Time	Rank	Time	Rank
Stig Sollander	Downhill					DSQ	–
Sixten Isberg	Downhill					2:53.4	34
Åke Nilsson	Downhill					2:47.0	27
John Fredriksson	Downhill					2:44.5	23
John Fredriksson	Giant Slalom					2:55.9	49
Sixten Isberg	Giant Slalom					2:42.3	30
Åke Nilsson	Giant Slalom					2:37.0	21
Stig Sollander	Giant Slalom					2:32.6	6
Åke Nilsson	Slalom	1:06.1	28 Q	1:03.4	12	2:09.5	18
John Fredriksson	Slalom	1:06.0	27 Q	1:05.9	21	2:11.9	24
Olle Dalman	Slalom	1:04.3	21 Q	1:04.5	16	2:08.8	15
Stig Sollander	Slalom	1:00.4	4 Q	1:02.2	8	2:02.6	5

Women

Athlete	Event	Race 1		Race 2		Total	
Athlete	Event	Time	Rank	Time	Rank	Time	Rank
Ingrid Englund	Downhill					2:01.3	29
Margareta Jacobsson	Downhill					1:58.2	25
Sarah Thomasson	Downhill					1:55.5	18
Margareta Jacobsson	Giant Slalom					DSQ	–
Ingrid Englund	Giant Slalom					2:29.9	32
Kerstin Ahlqvist	Giant Slalom					2:21.4	26
Sarah Thomasson	Giant Slalom					2:18.4	21
Ingrid Englund	Slalom	1:14.8	27	1:13.9	29	2:28.7	27
Kerstin Ahlqvist	Slalom	1:10.8	18	1:12.5	26	2:23.3	20
Margareta Jacobsson	Slalom	1:10.4	17	1:10.2	20	2:20.6	16
Sarah Thomasson	Slalom	1:09.9	15	1:08.4	13	2:18.3	12

== Bobsleigh ==
Sled	Athletes	Event	Run 1		Run 2		Run 3		Run 4		Total	
Sled	Athletes	Event	Time	Rank	Time	Rank	Time	Rank	Time	Rank	Time	Rank
SWE-1	Olle Axelsson; Jan Lapidoth	Two-man	1:24.30	11	1:23.92	7	1:23.46	8	1:24.09	9	5:35.77	8
SWE-2	Kjell Holmström; Nils Landgren	Two-man	1:25.76	14	1:25.84	15	1:25.65	15	1:25.57	15	5:42.82	15

Sled	Athletes	Event	Run 1		Run 2		Run 3		Run 4		Total	
Sled	Athletes	Event	Time	Rank	Time	Rank	Time	Rank	Time	Rank	Time	Rank
SWE-1	Kjell Holmström; Felix Fernström; Nils Landgren; Jan Lapidoth	Four-man	1:19.11	7	1:19.90	7	1:17.28	3	1:18.72	5	5:15.01	6
SWE-2	Gunnar Åhs; Börje Ekedahl; Lennart Sandin; Gunnar Garpö	Four-man	1:18.84	5	1:19.93	9	1:18.66	7	1:20.43	9	5:17.86	7

== Cross-country skiing ==
Men

Event	Athlete	Race	
Event	Athlete	Time	Rank
18 km	Lars-Erik Efverström	1'14:19	58
18 km	Erik Elmsäter	1'13:46	56
18 km	Enar Josefsson	1'05:10	13
18 km	Gunnar Östberg	1'03:44	9
18 km	Nils Täpp	1'03:35	7
18 km	Nils Karlsson	1'02:56	5
50 km	Arthur Herrdin	3'57:46	13
50 km	Gunnar Eriksson	3'55:45	12
50 km	Anders Törnqvist	3'49:22	10
50 km	Nils Karlsson	3'39:30	6

Men's 4 × 10 km relay

Athletes	Race	
Athletes	Time	Rank
Nils Täpp; Sigurd Andersson; Enar Josefsson; Martin Lundström	2'24:13	3rd place, bronze medalist(s)

Women

Event	Athlete	Race	
Event	Athlete	Time	Rank
10 km	Sonja Ruthström-Edström	45:41	11
10 km	Eivor Alm	45:20	9
10 km	Margit Albrechtsson	45:05	8
10 km	Märta Norberg	42:53	4

== Figure skating ==
Pairs

Athletes	Points	Places	Rank
Britta Lindmark; Ulf Berendt	8.756	106	12

== Ice hockey ==
Summary

Team	Event	Round robin								Tiebreaker	Rank
Team	Event	Opposition Score	Opposition Score	Opposition Score	Opposition Score	Opposition Score	Opposition Score	Opposition Score	Opposition Score	Opposition Score	Rank
Sweden men's	Men's tournament	Finland; W 9–2	Poland; W 17–1	Norway; W 4–2	West Germany; W 7–3	United States; W 4–2	Canada; L 2–3	Switzerland; W 5–2	Czechoslovakia; L 0–4	Czechoslovakia; W 5–3	3rd place, bronze medalist(s)

The tournament was run in a round-robin format with nine teams participating.

Team	Pld	W	L	T	GF	GA	Pts
Canada	8	7	0	1	71	14	15
United States	8	6	1	1	43	21	13
Sweden (bronze)	9	7	2	0	53	22	14
Czechoslovakia	9	6	3	0	50	23	12
Switzerland	8	4	4	0	40	40	8
Poland	8	2	5	1	21	56	5
Finland	8	2	6	0	21	60	4
West Germany	8	1	6	1	21	53	3
Norway	8	0	8	0	15	46	0

- Sweden 9–2 Finland
- Sweden 17–1 Poland
- Norway 2–4 Sweden
- Sweden 7–3 Germany FR
- Sweden 4–2 USA
- Canada 3–2 Sweden
- Sweden 5–2 Switzerland
- Czechoslovakia 4–0 Sweden
- Sweden 5–3 Czechoslovakia ^{1}

^{1} Sweden and Czechoslovakia were tied with identical record and goal differentials, so a tie breaker game was played.

Bronze:
Sweden

Göte Almqvist
Hans Andersson
Stig Andersson
Åke Andersson
Lasse Björn
Göte Blomqvist
Thord Flodqvist
Erik Johansson
Gösta Johansson
Rune Johansson
Sven "Tumba" Johansson
Åke Lassas
Holger Nurmela
Lars Pettersson
Lars Svensson
Sven Thunman
Hans Öberg

== Nordic combined ==
Events:

- 18 km cross-country skiing
- normal hill ski jumping

The cross-country skiing part of this event was combined with the main medal event, meaning that athletes competing here were skiing for two disciplines at the same time. Details can be found above in this article, in the cross-country skiing section.

The ski jumping (normal hill) event was held separate from the main medal event of ski jumping, results can be found in the table below (athletes were allowed to perform three jumps, the best two jumps were counted and are shown here).

Athlete	Event	Cross-country		Ski jumping				Total	
Athlete	Event	Points	Rank	Distance 1	Distance 2	Points	Rank	Points	Rank
Lars-Erik Efverström	Individual	196.667	17	59.5	60.5	193.0	15	389.667	17
Erik Elmsäter	Individual	198.667	16	61.0	62.0	199.0	11	397.667	13

== Ski jumping ==
Athlete	Event	Jump 1			Jump 2			Total	
Athlete	Event	Distance	Points	Rank	Distance	Points	Rank	Points	Rank
Thure Lindgren	Normal hill	63.0 (fall)	72.0	40	62.5	103.5	10	175.5	40
Hans Nordin	Normal hill	63.5	104.5	12	61.5	102.0	13	206.5	11
Karl Holmström	Normal hill	67.0	110.0	5	65.5	109.5	2	219.5	3rd place, bronze medalist(s)
Bror Östman	Normal hill	66.5	110.0	5	65.0 (fall)	77.0	43	187.0	32

== Speed skating ==
Men

Event	Athlete	Race	
Event	Athlete	Time	Rank
500 m	Bengt Malmsten	46.6	31
500 m	Stig H Lindberg	45.9	25
500 m	Gunnar Ström	45.6	23
500 m	Mats Bolmstedt	44.8	12
1500 m	John Wickström	2:27.6	26
1500 m	Gunnar Ström	2:25.8	19
1500 m	Sigvard Ericsson	2:23.4	8
1500 m	Carl-Erik Asplund	2:22.6	4
5000 m	John Wickström	8:47.2	18
5000 m	Sigvard Ericsson	8:40.0	14
5000 m	Göthe Hedlund	8:39.2	11
5000 m	Carl-Erik Asplund	8:30.7	6
10,000 m	Gunnar Hallkvist	18:20.9	20
10,000 m	Sigvard Ericsson	17:52.8	13
10,000 m	Göthe Hedlund	17:39.2	9
10,000 m	Carl-Erik Asplund	17:16.6	3rd place, bronze medalist(s)
