= List of Olympic medalists for Sweden =

The following is a list of Swedish athletes who won medals at the Olympic Games.

== Summer Olympics ==
Medal	Name	Games	Sport	Event
Bronze	Ernst Fast	1900 Paris	Athletics	Men's marathon
Gold	Frithiof Mårtensson	1908 London	Wrestling (Greco-Roman)	Men's middleweight
Gold	Swedish men's team	1908 London	Gymnastics	Men's team
Gold	Hjalmar Johansson	1908 London	Diving	Men's 10 m platform
Gold	Ulrich Salchow	1908 London	Figure skating	Men's singles
Gold	Oscar Swahn	1908 London	Shooting	Men's single-shot running deer
Gold	Arvid Knöppel; Ernst Rosell; Alfred Swahn; Oscar Swahn	1908 London	Shooting	Men's team single-shot running deer
Gold	Eric Lemming	1908 London	Athletics	Men's javelin throw
Gold	Eric Lemming	1908 London	Athletics	Men's freestyle javelin
Silver	Mauritz Andersson	1908 London	Wrestling (Greco-Roman)	Men's middleweight
Silver	Karl Malmström	1908 London	Diving	Men's 10 m platform
Silver	Richard Johansson	1908 London	Figure skating	Men's singles
Silver	Carl Hellström; Edmund Thormählen; Erik Wallerius; Eric Sandberg; Harald Wallin	1908 London	Sailing	Men's 8 metre class
Silver	Per-Olof Arvidsson; Janne Gustafsson; Axel Jansson; Gustaf Adolf Jonsson; Claës Rundberg; Gustav-Adolf Sjöberg	1908 London	Shooting	Men's team free rifle
Silver	Eric Carlberg; Vilhelm Carlberg; Johan Hübner von Holst; Franz-Albert Schartau	1908 London	Shooting	Men's team small-bore rifle
Bronze	Robert Andersson; Erik Bergvall; Pontus Hanson; Harald Julin; Torsten Kumfeldt; Axel Runström; Gunnar Wennerström	1908 London	Water polo	Men's competition
Bronze	Märtha Adlerstråhle	1908 London	Tennis	Women's indoor singles
Bronze	Wollmar Boström; Gunnar Setterwall	1908 London	Tennis	Men's indoor doubles
Bronze	Harald Julin	1908 London	Swimming	Men's 100 m freestyle
Bronze	Pontus Hanson	1908 London	Swimming	Men's 200 m breaststroke
Bronze	Arvid Spångberg	1908 London	Diving	Men's 10 m platform
Bronze	Per Thorén	1908 London	Figure skating	Men's singles
Bronze	Oscar Swahn	1908 London	Shooting	Men's double-shot running deer
Bronze	Otto Nilsson	1908 London	Athletics	Men's freestyle javelin
Bronze	Bruno Söderström	1908 London	Athletics	Men's pole vault
Bronze	John Svanberg	1908 London	Athletics	Men's 5 miles
Gold	Hjalmar Andersson; John Eke; Josef Ternström	1912 Stockholm	Athletics	Men's team cross-country
Gold	Hugo Wieslander	1912 Stockholm	Athletics	Men's decathlon
Gold	Eric Lemming	1912 Stockholm	Athletics	Men's javelin
Gold	Gustaf Lindblom	1912 Stockholm	Athletics	Men's triple jump
Gold	Erik Friborg; Ragnar Malm; Axel Persson; Algot Lönn	1912 Stockholm	Cycling	Men's team time trial
Gold	Erik Adlerz	1912 Stockholm	Diving	Men's 10m Platform
Gold	Greta Johansson	1912 Stockholm	Diving	Women's 10 m Platform
Gold	Erik Adlerz	1912 Stockholm	Diving	Men's plain high diving
Gold	Carl Bonde	1912 Stockholm	Equestrian	Individual dressage
Gold	Axel Nordlander	1912 Stockholm	Equestrian	Individual eventing
Gold	Axel Nordlander; Nils Adlercreutz; Ernst Casparsson; Henric Horn af Åminne	1912 Stockholm	Equestrian	Team eventing
Gold	Gustaf Lewenhaupt; Gustaf Kilman; Hans von Rosen; Fredrik Rosencrantz	1912 Stockholm	Equestrian	Team jumping
Gold	Men's team: Per Bertilsson; Carl-Ehrenfried Carlberg; Nils Granfelt; Curt Hartzell; Oswald Holmberg; Anders Hylander; Axel Janse; Boo Kullberg; Sven Landberg; Per Nilsson; Benkt Norelius; Axel Norling; Daniel Norling; Sven Rosén; Nils Silfverskiöld; Carl Silfverstrand; John Sörenson; Yngve Stiernspetz; Carl-Erik Svensson; Karl Johan Svensson; Knut Torell; Edward Wennerholm; Claes Wersäll; David Wiman	1912 Stockholm	Gymnastics	Men's team (Swedish system)
Gold	Gösta Lilliehöök	1912 Stockholm	Modern pentathlon	Men's individual
Gold	Carl Hellström; Erik Wallerius; Harald Wallin; Humbert Lundén; Herman Nyberg; Harry Rosenswärd; Paul Isberg; Filip Ericsson	1912 Stockholm	Sailing	Men's 10 metre class
Gold	Åke Lundeberg	1912 Stockholm	Shooting	Men's 100 m running deer, double shots
Gold	Alfred Swahn	1912 Stockholm	Shooting	Men's 100 m running deer, single shot
Gold	Alfred Swahn; Oscar Swahn; Åke Lundeberg; Per-Olof Arvidsson	1912 Stockholm	Shooting	Men's team 100 m running deer, single shot
Gold	Johan von Holst; Eric Carlberg; Vilhelm Carlberg; Gustaf Boivie	1912 Stockholm	Shooting	Men's team 25 m small-bore rifle
Gold	Vilhelm Carlberg	1912 Stockholm	Shooting	Men's 25 m small-bore rifle
Gold	Eric Carlberg; Vilhelm Carlberg; Johan von Holst; Paul Palén	1912 Stockholm	Shooting	Men's team 30 m military pistol
Gold	Mauritz Eriksson; Hugo Johansson; Erik Blomqvist; Carl Björkman; Bernhard Larsson; Gustaf Jonsson	1912 Stockholm	Shooting	Men's team free rifle
Gold	Arvid Andersson; Adolf Bergman; Johan Edman; Erik Algot Fredriksson; Carl Jonsson; Erik Larsson; August Gustafsson; Herbert Lindström	1912 Stockholm	Tug of war	Men's team
Gold	Claes Johansson	1912 Stockholm	Wrestling (Greco-Roman)	Men's middleweight
Silver	Thorild Ohlsson; Ernst Wide; Bror Fock; Nils Frykberg; John Zander	1912 Stockholm	Athletics	Men's 3000 m team
Silver	Ivan Möller; Charles Luther; Ture Person; Knut Lindberg	1912 Stockholm	Athletics	Men's 4 × 100 m relay
Silver	Hjalmar Andersson	1912 Stockholm	Athletics	Men's individual cross-country
Silver	Charles Lomberg	1912 Stockholm	Athletics	Men's decathlon
Silver	Georg Åberg	1912 Stockholm	Athletics	Men's triple jump
Silver	Lisa Regnell	1912 Stockholm	Diving	Women's 10 m platform
Silver	Hjalmar Johansson	1912 Stockholm	Diving	Plain high diving
Silver	Gustaf Adolf Boltenstern	1912 Stockholm	Equestrian	Individual dressage
Silver	Gösta Åsbrink	1912 Stockholm	Modern pentathlon	Men's individual
Silver	Ture Rosvall; William Bruhn-Möller; Conrad Brunkman; Herman Dahlbäck; Leo Wilkens	1912 Stockholm	Rowing	Men's coxed fours, inriggers
Silver	Nils Persson; Hugo Clason; Richard Sällström; Nils Lamby; Kurt Bergström; Dick Bergström; Erik Lindqvist; Per Bergman; Sigurd Kander; Folke Johnson	1912 Stockholm	Sailing	Men's 12 metre class
Silver	Bengt Heyman; Emil Henriques; Herbert Westermark; Nils Westermark; Alvar Thiel	1912 Stockholm	Sailing	Men's metre class
Silver	Edward Benedicks	1912 Stockholm	Shooting	Men's 100 m running deer, double shots
Silver	Åke Lundeberg	1912 Stockholm	Shooting	Men's 100 m running deer, single shot
Silver	Paul Palén	1912 Stockholm	Shooting	Men's 25 m rapid fire pistol
Silver	Johan von Holst	1912 Stockholm	Shooting	Men's 25 m small-bore rifle
Silver	Georg de Laval; Eric Carlberg; Vilhelm Carlberg; Erik Boström	1912 Stockholm	Shooting	Men's team 50 m military pistol
Silver	Arthur Nordenswan; Eric Carlberg; Ruben Örtegren; Vilhelm Carlberg	1912 Stockholm	Shooting	Men's team 50 m small-bore rifle
Silver	Thor Henning	1912 Stockholm	Swimming	Men's 400 m breaststroke
Silver	Carl Kempe; Gunnar Setterwall	1912 Stockholm	Tennis	Men's doubles indoor
Silver	Sigrid Fick; Gunnar Setterwall	1912 Stockholm	Tennis	Mixed doubles outdoor
Silver	Torsten Kumfeldt; Harald Julin; Max Gumpel; Robert Andersson; Pontus Hanson; Vilhelm Andersson; Erik Bergqvist	1912 Stockholm	Water polo	Men's team
Silver	Gustaf Malmström	1912 Stockholm	Wrestling (Greco-Roman)	Men's lightweight
Silver	Anders Ahlgren	1912 Stockholm	Wrestling (Greco-Roman)	Men's light heavyweight
Bronze	John Eke	1912 Stockholm	Athletics	Men's individual cross-country
Bronze	Gosta Holmer	1912 Stockholm	Athletics	Men's decathlon
Bronze	Emil Magnusson	1912 Stockholm	Athletics	Men's two handed discus throw
Bronze	Georg Åberg	1912 Stockholm	Athletics	Men's long jump
Bronze	Bertil Uggla	1912 Stockholm	Athletics	Men's pole vault
Bronze	Erik Almlöf	1912 Stockholm	Athletics	Men's triple jump
Bronze	Gustaf Blomgren	1912 Stockholm	Diving	Men's 10 m platform
Bronze	John Jansson	1912 Stockholm	Diving	Men's plain high diving
Bronze	Hans von Blixen-Finecke	1912 Stockholm	Equestrian	Individual dressage
Bronze	Georg de Laval	1912 Stockholm	Modern pentathlon	Men's individual
Bronze	Eric Sandberg; Harald Sandberg; Otto Aust	1912 Stockholm	Sailing	Men's 6 metre class
Bronze	Oscar Swahn	1912 Stockholm	Shooting	Men's 100 m running deer, double shots
Bronze	Johan von Holst	1912 Stockholm	Shooting	Men's 25 m rapid fire pistol
Bronze	Gideon Ericsson	1912 Stockholm	Shooting	Men's 25 m small-bore rifle
Bronze	Mauritz Eriksson; Verner Jernström; Tönnes Björkman; Carl Björkman; Bernhard Larsson; Carl Johansson	1912 Stockholm	Shooting	Men's team military rifle
Bronze	Sigrid Fick; Gunnar Setterwall	1912 Stockholm	Tennis	Mixed doubles indoor
Bronze	Edvin Mattiasson	1912 Stockholm	Wrestling (Greco-Roman)	Men's lightweight
Gold	William Petersson	1920 Antwerp	Athletics	Men's long jump
Gold	Harry Stenqvist	1920 Antwerp	Cycling	Men's individual time trial
Gold	Arvid Wallman	1920 Antwerp	Diving	Plain high diving
Gold	Janne Lundblad	1920 Antwerp	Equestrian	Individual dressage
Gold	Helmer Morner	1920 Antwerp	Equestrian	Individual eventing
Gold	Helmer Mörner; Åge Lundström; Georg von Braun; Gustaf Dyrsch	1920 Antwerp	Equestrian	Team eventing
Gold	Hans von Rosen; Claës König; Daniel Norling; Frank Martin	1920 Antwerp	Equestrian	Team jumping
Gold	Gillis Grafström	1920 Antwerp	Figure skating	Men's singles
Gold	Magda Julin	1920 Antwerp	Figure skating	Women's singles
Gold	Men's Team (Swedish system)	1920 Antwerp	Gymnastics	Men's team
Gold	Gustaf Dyrssen	1920 Antwerp	Modern pentathlon	Men's individual
Gold	Gösta Lundqvist; Rolf Steffenburg; Gösta Bengtsson; Axel Calvert	1920 Antwerp	Sailing	Men's 30 m^{2} class
Gold	Tore Holm; Yngve Holm; Axel Rydin; Georg Tengwall	1920 Antwerp	Sailing	Men's 40 m^{2} class
Gold	Hugo Johansson	1920 Antwerp	Shooting	Men's 600 m free rifle
Gold	Håkan Malmrot	1920 Antwerp	Swimming	Men's 200 m breaststroke
Gold	Håkan Malmrot	1920 Antwerp	Swimming	Men's 400 m breaststroke
Gold	Anders Larsson	1920 Antwerp	Wrestling (freestyle)	Men's light heavyweight
Gold	Carl Westergren	1920 Antwerp	Wrestling (Greco-Roman)	Men's middleweight
Gold	Claes Johanson	1920 Antwerp	Wrestling (Greco-Roman)	Men's light heavyweight
Silver	Erik Backman	1920 Antwerp	Athletics	Men's individual cross-country
Silver	Carl Johan Lind	1920 Antwerp	Athletics	Men's hammer throw
Silver	Folke Jansson	1920 Antwerp	Athletics	Men's triple jump
Silver	Harry Stenqvist; Ragnar Malm; Axel Persson; Sigfrid Lundberg	1920 Antwerp	Cycling	Men's team time trial
Silver	Erik Adlerz	1920 Antwerp	Diving	Men's 10 m platform
Silver	Nils Skoglund	1920 Antwerp	Diving	Plain high diving
Silver	Åge Lundström	1920 Antwerp	Equestrian	Individual eventing
Silver	Bertil Sandström	1920 Antwerp	Equestrian	Individual dressage
Silver	Svea Norén	1920 Antwerp	Figure skating	Women's singles
Silver	Erik de Laval	1920 Antwerp	Modern pentathlon	Men's individual
Silver	Gustaf Svensson; Ragnar Svensson; Percy Almstedt; Erik Mellbin	1920 Antwerp	Sailing	Men's 40 m^{2} class
Silver	Fredric Landelius	1920 Antwerp	Shooting	Men's 100 m running deer, double shots
Silver	Alfred Swahn; Oscar Swahn; Fredric Landelius; Bengt Lagercrantz; Edward Benedicks	1920 Antwerp	Shooting	Men's Team 100 m running deer, double shots
Silver	Alfred Swahn	1920 Antwerp	Shooting	Men's 100 m running deer, single shot
Silver	Anders Andersson; Casimir Reuterskiöld; Gunnar Gabrielsson; Sigvard Hultcrantz; Anders Johnson	1920 Antwerp	Shooting	Men's team 50 m army pistol
Silver	Sigvard Hultcrantz; Erik Ohlsson; Leon Lagerlöf; Ragnar Stare; Olle Ericsson	1920 Antwerp	Shooting	Men's team 50 m small bore rifle
Silver	Mauritz Eriksson	1920 Antwerp	Shooting	Men's 600 m free rifle
Silver	Thor Henning	1920 Antwerp	Swimming	Men's 200 m breaststroke
Silver	Thor Henning	1920 Antwerp	Swimming	Men's 400 m breaststroke
Silver	Gottfrid Svensson	1920 Antwerp	Wrestling (freestyle)	Men's lightweight
Bronze	Erik Backman; Sven Lundgren; Edvin Wide	1920 Antwerp	Athletics	Men's 3000 m team
Bronze	Nils Engdahl	1920 Antwerp	Athletics	Men's 400 m
Bronze	Agne Holmström; William Petersson; Sven Malm; Nils Sandström	1920 Antwerp	Athletics	Men's 4×100 m relay
Bronze	Erik Backman	1920 Antwerp	Athletics	Men's 5000 m
Bronze	Carl Johan Lind	1920 Antwerp	Athletics	Men's 56 lb weight throw
Bronze	Erik Backman; Gustaf Mattsson; Hilding Ekman	1920 Antwerp	Athletics	Men's team cross-country
Bronze	Bertil Ohlson	1920 Antwerp	Athletics	Men's decathlon
Bronze	Bo Ekelund	1920 Antwerp	Athletics	Men's high jump
Bronze	Erik Abrahamsson	1920 Antwerp	Athletics	Men's long jump
Bronze	Erik Almlöf	1920 Antwerp	Athletics	Men's triple jump
Bronze	Eva Olliwier	1920 Antwerp	Diving	Women's 10 m platform
Bronze	John Jansson	1920 Antwerp	Diving	Men's plain high diving
Bronze	Carl Gustaf Lewenhaupt	1920 Antwerp	Equestrian	Individual jumping
Bronze	Hans von Rosen	1920 Antwerp	Equestrian	Individual dressage
Bronze	Anders Mårtensson; Oskar Nilsson; Carl Green	1920 Antwerp	Equestrian	Team vaulting
Bronze	Gösta Runö	1920 Antwerp	Modern pentathlon	Men's Individual
Bronze	Olle Ericsson; Hugo Johansson; Leon Lagerlöf; Walfrid Hellman; Mauritz Eriksson	1920 Antwerp	Shooting	Men's team 300 m army rifle, standing
Bronze	Mauritz Eriksson; Hugo Johansson; Gustaf Jonsson; Erik Blomqvist; Erik Ohlsson	1920 Antwerp	Shooting	Men's team 600 m free rifle
Bronze	Erik Lundquist; Per Kinde; Fredric Landelius; Alfred Swahn; Karl Richter; Erik Sökjer-Petersén	1920 Antwerp	Shooting	Men's team clay pigeons
Bronze	Aina Berg; Emy Machnow; Carin Nilsson; Jane Gylling	1920 Antwerp	Swimming	Women's 4×100 m freestyle relay
Bronze	National water polo team	1920 Antwerp	Water polo	Men's Team competition
Bronze	Albert Pettersson	1920 Antwerp	Weightlifting	Men's middleweight
Bronze	Erik Pettersson	1920 Antwerp	Weightlifting	Men's light heavyweight
Bronze	Ernst Nilsson	1920 Antwerp	Wrestling (freestyle)	Men's heavyweight
Bronze	Fritiof Svensson	1920 Antwerp	Wrestling (Greco-Roman)	Men's featherweight
Gold	Ernst Linder	1924 Paris	Equestrian	Individual dressage
Gold	Åke Thelning; Axel Ståhle; Åge Lundström	1924 Paris	Equestrian	Team jumping
Gold	Bo Lindman	1924 Paris	Modern pentathlon	Men's individual
Gold	Carl Westergren	1924 Paris	Wrestling (Greco-Roman)	Men's light heavyweight
Silver	Edvin Wide	1924 Paris	Athletics	Men's 10000 m
Silver	Erik Bylehn; Nils Engdahl; Arthur Svensson; Gustaf Weijnarth	1924 Paris	Athletics	Men's 4×400 m relay
Silver	Gunnar Lindström	1924 Paris	Athletics	Men's javelin throw
Silver	John Jansson	1924 Paris	Diving	Men's plain high diving
Silver	Bertil Sandström	1924 Paris	Equestrian	Individual dressage
Silver	Claës König; Gustaf Hagelin; Carl Gustaf Lewenhaupt; Torsten Sylvan	1924 Paris	Equestrian	Team eventing
Silver	Gustaf Dyrssen	1924 Paris	Modern pentathlon	Men's individual
Silver	Otto Hultberg; Mauritz Johansson; Fredric Landelius; Karl Richter; Karl-Gustaf Svensson; Alfred Swahn	1924 Paris	Shooting	Men's team 100 m running deer, single shot
Silver	Vilhelm Carlberg	1924 Paris	Shooting	Men's 25 m rapid fire pistol
Silver	Arne Borg	1924 Paris	Swimming	Men's 1500 m freestyle
Silver	Arne Borg	1924 Paris	Swimming	Men's 400 m freestyle
Silver	Rudolf Svensson	1924 Paris	Wrestling (freestyle)	Men's light heavyweight
Silver	Rudolf Svensson	1924 Paris	Wrestling (Greco-Roman)	Men's light heavyweight
Bronze	Sten Pettersson	1924 Paris	Athletics	Men's 110 m hurdles
Bronze	Edvin Wide	1924 Paris	Athletics	Men's 5000 m
Bronze	Gunnar Sköld; Erik Bohlin; Ragnar Malm	1924 Paris	Cycling	Men's team road race
Bronze	Hjördis Töpel	1924 Paris	Diving	Women's 10 m platform
Bronze	Nils Hellsten	1924 Paris	Fencing	Men's individual épée
Bronze	National men's football team: Axel Alfredsson; Charles Brommesson; Gustaf Carlsson; Albin Dahl; Sven Friberg; Karl Gustafsson; Fritjof Hillén; Konrad Hirsch; Gunnar Holmberg; Per Kaufeldt; Tore Keller; Rudolf Kock; Sigfrid Lindberg; Vigor Lindberg; Sven Lindqvist; Evert Lundqvist; Sten Mellgren; Gunnar Olsson; Sven Rydell; Harry Sundberg; Thorsten Svensson; Robert Zander	1924 Paris	Football	Men's competition
Bronze	Bertil Uggla	1924 Paris	Modern pentathlon	Men's individual
Bronze	Alfred Swahn	1924 Paris	Shooting	Men's 100 m running deer, double shots
Bronze	Edward Benedicks; Axel Ekblom; Mauritz Johansson; Fredric Landelius; Karl-Gustaf Svensson; Alfred Swahn	1924 Paris	Shooting	Men's team 100 m running deer, double shots
Bronze	Aina Berg; Gurli Ewerlund; Jane Gylling; Wivian Pettersson; Hjördis Töpel	1924 Paris	Swimming	Women's 4×100 m freestyle relay
Bronze	Åke Borg; Arne Borg; Thor Henning; Gösta Persson, Orvar Trolle; Georg Werner	1924 Paris	Swimming	Men's 4×200 m freestyle relay
Bronze	Eric Malmberg	1924 Paris	Wrestling (Greco-Roman)	Men's featherweight
Gold	Erik Lundqvist	1928 Amsterdam	Athletics	Men's javelin throw
Gold	Sven Thofelt	1928 Amsterdam	Modern pentathlon	Men's individual
Gold	Sven Thorell	1928 Amsterdam	Sailing	Men's 12 foot dinghy
Gold	Arne Borg	1928 Amsterdam	Swimming	Men's 1500 m freestyle
Gold	Johan Richthoff	1928 Amsterdam	Wrestling (freestyle)	Men's heavyweight
Gold	Thure Sjöstedt	1928 Amsterdam	Wrestling (freestyle)	Men's light heavyweight
Gold	Rudolf Svensson	1928 Amsterdam	Wrestling (Greco-Roman)	Men's heavyweight
Silver	Erik Byléhn	1928 Amsterdam	Athletics	Men's 800 m
Silver	Ossian Skiöld	1928 Amsterdam	Athletics	Men's hammer throw
Silver	Nils Ramm	1928 Amsterdam	Boxing	Men's heavyweight
Silver	Carl Bonde; Janne Lundblad; Ragnar Olson	1928 Amsterdam	Equestrian	Team dressage
Silver	Bo Lindman	1928 Amsterdam	Modern pentathlon	Men's individual
Silver	Eric Malmberg	1928 Amsterdam	Wrestling (Greco-Roman)	Men's featherweight
Bronze	Edvin Wide	1928 Amsterdam	Athletics	Men's 10000 m
Bronze	Edvin Wide	1928 Amsterdam	Athletics	Men's 5000 m
Bronze	Inga Gentzel	1928 Amsterdam	Athletics	Women's 800 m
Bronze	Ruth Svedberg	1928 Amsterdam	Athletics	Women's discus throw
Bronze	Gunnar Berggren	1928 Amsterdam	Boxing	Men's lightweight
Bronze	Gösta Carlsson	1928 Amsterdam	Cycling	Men's Individual time trial
Bronze	Erik Jansson; Georg Johnsson; Gösta Carlsson	1928 Amsterdam	Cycling	Men's Team time trial
Bronze	Laura Sjöqvist	1928 Amsterdam	Diving	Women's 10 m platform
Bronze	Ragnar Olson	1928 Amsterdam	Equestrian	Individual dressage
Bronze	Karl Hansén; Carl Bjornstjerna; Ernst Hallberg	1928 Amsterdam	Equestrian	Team jumping
Bronze	Carl Sandblom; John Sandblom; Philip Sandblom; Tore Holm; Clarence Hammar; Wilhelm Törsleff	1928 Amsterdam	Sailing	Men's 8 metre class
Bronze	Arne Borg	1928 Amsterdam	Swimming	Men's 400m freestyle
Gold	Bertil Rönnmark	1932 Los Angeles	Shooting	Men's 50 metre rifle, prone
Gold	Johan Gabriel Oxenstierna	1932 Los Angeles	Modern pentathlon	Men's individual
Gold	Eric Malmberg	1932 Los Angeles	Wrestling (Greco-Roman)	Men's lightweight
Gold	Ivar Johansson	1932 Los Angeles	Wrestling (Greco-Roman)	Men's welterweight
Gold	Rudolf Svensson	1932 Los Angeles	Wrestling (Greco-Roman)	Men's heavyweight
Gold	Carl Westergren	1932 Los Angeles	Wrestling (Greco-Roman)	Men's light heavyweight
Gold	Ivar Johansson	1932 Los Angeles	Wrestling (freestyle)	Men's middleweight
Gold	Johan Richthoff	1932 Los Angeles	Wrestling (freestyle)	Men's heavyweight
Gold	Tore Holm; Martin Hindorff; Olle Åkerlund; Åke Bergqvist	1932 Los Angeles	Sailing	Men's 6 metre class
Silver	Erik Svensson	1932 Los Angeles	Athletics	Men's triple jump
Silver	Thure Ahlqvist	1932 Los Angeles	Boxing	Men's lightweight
Silver	Bo Lindman	1932 Los Angeles	Modern pentathlon	Men's individual
Silver	Thure Sjöstedt	1932 Los Angeles	Wrestling (freestyle)	Men's light heavyweight
Silver	Bertil Sandström; Thomas Byström; Gustaf Adolf Boltenstern, Jr.	1932 Los Angeles	Equestrian	Team dressage
Bronze	Allan Carlsson	1932 Los Angeles	Boxing	Men's featherweight
Bronze	Axel Cadier	1932 Los Angeles	Wrestling (Greco-Roman)	Men's middleweight
Bronze	Einar Karlsson	1932 Los Angeles	Wrestling (freestyle)	Men's featherweight
Bronze	Gustaf Klarén	1932 Los Angeles	Wrestling (freestyle)	Men's lightweight
Bronze	Gunnar Asther; Daniel Sundén-Cullberg	1932 Los Angeles	Sailing	Men's Star class
Bronze	Clarence von Rosen, Jr.	1932 Los Angeles	Equestrian	Individual jumping
Bronze	Clarence von Rosen, Jr.	1932 Los Angeles	Equestrian	Individual eventing
Bronze	Bernhard Britz	1932 Los Angeles	Cycling	Men's individual time trial
Bronze	Arne Berg; Bernhard Britz; Sven Höglund	1932 Los Angeles	Cycling	Men's team time trial
Gold	Erik Bladström; Sven Johansson	1936 Berlin	Canoeing	Men's F2 10000 m
Gold	Torsten Ullman	1936 Berlin	Shooting	Men's free pistol
Gold	Rudolf Svedberg	1936 Berlin	Wrestling (Greco-Roman)	Men's welterweight
Gold	Ivar Johansson	1936 Berlin	Wrestling (Greco-Roman)	Men's middleweight
Gold	Axel Cadier	1936 Berlin	Wrestling (Greco-Roman)	Men's light-heavyweight
Gold	Knut Fridell	1936 Berlin	Wrestling (freestyle)	Men's light-Heavyweight
Silver	Gösta Almgren; Birger Cederin; Hans Drakenberg; Gustaf Dyrssen; Hans Granfelt; Sven Thofelt	1936 Berlin	Fencing	Men's team épée
Silver	Egon Svensson	1936 Berlin	Wrestling (Greco-Roman)	Men's bantamweight
Silver	John Nyman	1936 Berlin	Wrestling (Greco-Roman)	Men's heavyweight
Silver	Thure Andersson	1936 Berlin	Wrestling (freestyle)	Men's welterweight
Silver	Arvid Laurin; Uno Wallentin	1936 Berlin	Sailing	Men's star class
Bronze	Henry Jonsson	1936 Berlin	Athletics	Men's 5000 m
Bronze	Fred Warngård	1936 Berlin	Athletics	Men's Hammer throw
Bronze	Erik Ågren	1936 Berlin	Boxing	Men's lightweight
Bronze	Tage Fahlborg; Helge Larsson	1936 Berlin	Canoeing	Men's K2 10000 m
Bronze	Gregor Adlercreutz; Sven Colliander; Folke Sandström	1936 Berlin	Equestrian	Team dressage
Bronze	Torsten Ullman	1936 Berlin	Shooting	Men's rapid-fire pistol
Bronze	Einar Karlsson	1936 Berlin	Wrestling (Greco-Roman)	Men's featherweight
Bronze	Gösta Jönsson	1936 Berlin	Wrestling (freestyle)	Men's featherweight
Bronze	Lennart Ekdahl; Martin Hindorff; Torsten Lord; Dagmar Salén; Sven Salén	1936 Berlin	Sailing	Men's 6 metre class
Gold	Henry Eriksson	1948 London	Athletics	Men's 1500 m
Gold	Tore Sjöstrand	1948 London	Athletics	Men's 3000 m steeplechase
Gold	John Mikaelsson	1948 London	Athletics	Men's 10 km walk
Gold	John Ljunggren	1948 London	Athletics	Men's 50 km walk
Gold	Arne Ahman	1948 London	Athletics	Men's triple jump
Gold	National men's football team: Sune Andersson; Henry Carlsson; Gunnar Gren; Barje Leander; Nils Liedholm; Torsten Lindberg; Erik Nilsson; Bertil Nordahl; Gunnar Nordahl; Knut Nordahl; Kjell Rosen; Birger Rosengren; Karl Svensson	1948 London	Football	Men's competition
Gold	William Grut	1948 London	Modern pentathlon	Men's individual
Gold	Kurt Pettersén	1948 London	Wrestling (Greco-Roman)	Men's bantamweight
Gold	Gustav Freij	1948 London	Wrestling (Greco-Roman)	Men's lightweight
Gold	Gösta Andersson	1948 London	Wrestling (Greco-Roman)	Men's welterweight
Gold	Axel Grönberg	1948 London	Wrestling (Greco-Roman)	Men's light-heavyweight
Gold	Karl-Erik Nilsson	1948 London	Wrestling (Greco-Roman)	Men's bantamweight
Gold	Gert Fredriksson	1948 London	Canoeing	Men's K-1 1000 m
Gold	Gert Fredriksson	1948 London	Canoeing	Men's K-1 10000 m
Gold	Gunnar Åkerlund; Hans Wetterström	1948 London	Canoeing	Men's K-2 10000 m
Gold	Hans Berglund; Lennart Klingström	1948 London	Canoeing	Men's K-2 1000 m
Silver	Folke Bohlin; Hugo Johnson; Gösta Brodin	1948 London	Sailing	Men's dragon class
Silver	Gunnar Nilsson	1948 London	Boxing	Men's heavyweight
Silver	Olle Anderberg	1948 London	Wrestling (Greco-Roman)	Men's featherweight
Silver	Tor Nilsson	1948 London	Wrestling (Greco-Roman)	Men's heavyweight
Silver	Ivar Sjölin	1948 London	Wrestling (freestyle)	Men's featherweight
Silver	Gösta Frändfors	1948 London	Wrestling (freestyle)	Men's lightweight
Silver	Bertil Antonsson	1948 London	Wrestling (freestyle)	Men's heavyweight
Silver	Robert Selfelt; Olof Stahre; Sigurd Svensson	1948 London	Equestrian	Team eventing
Silver	Lennart Strand	1948 London	Athletics	Men's 1500 m
Silver	Ingemar Johansson	1948 London	Athletics	Men's 10 km walk
Silver	Erik Elmsäter	1948 London	Athletics	Men's 3000 m steeplechase
Bronze	Gösta Magnusson	1948 London	Weightlifting	Men's light-heavyweight
Bronze	Frank Cervell; Carl Forssell; Bengt Ljungquist; Sven Thofelt; Per Hjalmar Carleson; Arne Tollbom	1948 London	Fencing	Men's team épée
Bronze	Gösta Gärdin	1948 London	Modern pentathlon	Men's individual
Bronze	Tore Holm; Torsten Lord; Martin Hindorff; Carl Robert Ameln; Gösta Salén	1948 London	Sailing	Men's 6 metre class
Bronze	Thure Johansson	1948 London	Wrestling (freestyle)	Men's flyweight
Bronze	Erik Lindén	1948 London	Wrestling (freestyle)	Men's middleweight
Bronze	Bengt Fahlqvist	1948 London	Wrestling (freestyle)	Men's light-heavyweight
Bronze	Jonas Jonsson	1948 London	Shooting	Men's 50 m rifle, prone position
Bronze	Torsten Ullman	1948 London	Shooting	Men's 50 m pistol
Bronze	Sven Lundquist	1948 London	Shooting	Men's 25 m rapid fire pistol
Bronze	Gustaf Adolf Boltenstern, Jr.	1948 London	Equestrian	Individual dressage
Bronze	Robert Selfelt	1948 London	Equestrian	Individual eventing
Bronze	Bertil Albertsson	1948 London	Athletics	Men's 10000 m
Bronze	Rune Larsson	1948 London	Athletics	Men's 400 m hurdles
Bronze	Rune Larsson; Kurt Lundquist; Lars-Erik Wolfbrandt; Folke Alnevik	1948 London	Athletics	Men's 4×400 m relay
Bronze	Göte Hagström	1948 London	Athletics	Men's 3000 m steeplechase
Bronze	Ann-Britt Leyman	1948 London	Athletics	Women's long jump
Gold	John Mikaelsson	1952 Helsinki	Athletics	Men's 10 km Walk
Gold	Gert Fredriksson	1952 Helsinki	Canoeing	Men's K1 1000 m
Gold	Hans von Blixen-Finecke Jr	1952 Helsinki	Equestrian	Individual eventing
Gold	Folke Frölén; Olof Stahre; Hans von Blixen-Finecke Jr	1952 Helsinki	Equestrian	Team eventing
Gold	Henri Saint Cyr	1952 Helsinki	Equestrian	Individual dressage
Gold	Gustaf Adolf Boltenstern, Jr. Gehnäll Persson; Henri Saint Cyr	1952 Helsinki	Equestrian	Team dressage
Gold	William Thoresson	1952 Helsinki	Gymnastics	Men's Floor
Gold	Gun Röring; Ingrid Sandahl; Hjördis Nordin; Ann-Sofi Pettersson; Göta Pettersson; Evy Berggren; Vanja Blomberg; Karin Lindberg	1952 Helsinki	Gymnastics	Women's Team Portable Apparatus
Gold	Lars Hall	1952 Helsinki	Modern pentathlon	Men's Individual
Gold	Axel Grönberg	1952 Helsinki	Wrestling (Greco-Roman)	Men's Middleweight
Gold	Olle Anderberg	1952 Helsinki	Wrestling (freestyle)	Men's lightweight
Gold	Viking Palm	1952 Helsinki	Wrestling (freestyle)	Men's light-heavyweight
Silver	Ingemar Johansson	1952 Helsinki	Boxing	Men's Heavyweight
Silver	Lars Glassér; Ingemar Hedberg	1952 Helsinki	Canoeing	Men's K2 1000 m
Silver	Gert Fredriksson	1952 Helsinki	Canoeing	Men's K1 10000 m
Silver	Gunnar Åkerlund; Hans Wetterström	1952 Helsinki	Canoeing	Men's K2 10000 m
Silver	Bengt Ljungquist; Lennart Magnusson; Berndt-Otto Rehbinder; Per Hjalmar Carleson; Sven Fahlman; Carl Forssell	1952 Helsinki	Fencing	Men's épée team
Silver	Claes Egnell; Lars Hall; Thorsten Lindqvist	1952 Helsinki	Modern pentathlon	Men's team
Silver	Knut Holmqvist	1952 Helsinki	Shooting	Men's trap
Silver	Olof Sköldberg	1952 Helsinki	Shooting	Men's running deer, single & double shot
Silver	Gustav Freij	1952 Helsinki	Wrestling (Greco-Roman)	Men's lightweight
Silver	Gösta Andersson	1952 Helsinki	Wrestling (Greco-Roman)	Men's welterweight
Silver	Per Gunnar Berlin	1952 Helsinki	Wrestling (freestyle)	Men's welterweight
Silver	Bertil Antonsson	1952 Helsinki	Wrestling (freestyle)	Men's heavyweight
Silver	Erland Almqvist; Sidney Boldt-Christmas; Per Gedda	1952 Helsinki	Sailing	Men's Dragon
Bronze	Gustaf Jansson	1952 Helsinki	Athletics	Men's Marathon
Bronze	Ragnar Lundberg	1952 Helsinki	Athletics	Men's pole vault
Bronze	Stig Sjölin	1952 Helsinki	Boxing	Men's middleweight
Bronze	National football team	1952 Helsinki	Football	Men's team
Bronze	Hans Liljedahl	1952 Helsinki	Shooting	Men's trap
Bronze	Göran Larsson	1952 Helsinki	Swimming	Men's 100m freestyle
Bronze	Per Olof Östrand	1952 Helsinki	Swimming	Men's 400m freestyle
Bronze	Karl-Erik Nilsson	1952 Helsinki	Wrestling (Greco-Roman)	Men's light-heavyweight
Bronze	Rickard Sarby	1952 Helsinki	Sailing	Men's finn
Bronze	Magnus Wassén; Carl-Erik Ohlson; Folke Wassén	1952 Helsinki	Sailing	Men's 5 1/2 m class
Gold	Gert Fredriksson	1956 Melbourne	Canoeing	Men's K1 1000 m
Gold	Gert Fredriksson	1956 Melbourne	Canoeing	Men's K1 10000 m
Gold	Petrus Kastenman	1956 Melbourne	Equestrian	Individual eventing
Gold	Henri Saint Cyr	1956 Melbourne	Equestrian	Individual dressage
Gold	Gustaf Adolf Boltenstern, Jr. Gehnäll Persson; Henri Saint Cyr	1956 Melbourne	Equestrian	Team dressage
Gold	Lars Hall	1956 Melbourne	Modern pentathlon	Men's Individual
Gold	Hjalmar Karlsson; Sture Stork; Lars Thörn	1956 Melbourne	Sailing	Men's 5 1/2 m class
Gold	Leif Wikström; Folke Bohlin; Bengt Palmquist	1956 Melbourne	Sailing	Men's dragon class
Silver	Karin Lindberg; Ann-Sofi Pettersson; Eva Rönström; Evy Berggren; Doris Hedberg; Maud Karlén	1956 Melbourne	Gymnastics	Women's team exercise with portable apparatus
Silver	Sven Gunnarsson; Olle Larsson; Ivar Aronsson; Gösta Eriksson; Bertil Göransson	1956 Melbourne	Rowing	Men's coxed fours
Silver	Olof Sköldberg	1956 Melbourne	Shooting	Men's running deer, single & double shot
Silver	Edvin Vesterby	1956 Melbourne	Wrestling (Greco-Roman)	Men's bantamweight
Silver	William Thoresson	1956 Melbourne	Gymnastics	Men's floor
Bronze	John Ljunggren	1956 Melbourne	Athletics	Men's 50 km walk
Bronze	Ann-Sofi Pettersson	1956 Melbourne	Gymnastics	Women's side horse vault
Bronze	John Sundberg	1956 Melbourne	Shooting	Men's small-bore rifle, three positions
Bronze	Per Gunnar Berlin	1956 Melbourne	Wrestling (Greco-Roman)	Men's welterweight
Bronze	Rune Jansson	1956 Melbourne	Wrestling (Greco-Roman)	Men's middleweight
Bronze	Karl-Erik Nilsson	1956 Melbourne	Wrestling (Greco-Roman)	Men's light-heavyweight
Gold	Sven-Olof Sjödelius; Gert Fredriksson	1960 Rome	Canoeing	Men's K2 1000 m
Silver	John Ljunggren	1960 Rome	Athletics	Men's 50 km walk
Silver	Jane Cederqvist	1960 Rome	Swimming	Women's 400 m freestyle
Bronze	Gert Fredriksson	1960 Rome	Canoeing	Men's K1 1000 m
Bronze	Gustav Freij	1960 Rome	Wrestling (Greco-Roman)	Men's Lightweight
Bronze	Hans Antonsson	1960 Rome	Wrestling (freestyle)	Men's middleweight
Gold	Rolf Peterson	1964 Tokyo	Canoeing	Men's K1 1000 m
Gold	Sven-Olov Sjödelius; Gunnar Utterberg	1964 Tokyo	Canoeing	Men's K2 1000 m
Silver	Per Svensson	1964 Tokyo	Wrestling (Greco-Roman)	Men's light heavyweight
Silver	Arne Karlsson; Sture Stork; Lars Thörn	1964 Tokyo	Sailing	Men's 5 1/2 metre class
Bronze	Ingvar Pettersson	1964 Tokyo	Athletics	Men's 50 km walk
Bronze	Sven Hamrin; Erik Pettersson; Gösta Pettersson; Sture Pettersson	1964 Tokyo	Cycling	Men's team road race
Bronze	Bertil Nyström	1964 Tokyo	Wrestling (Greco-Roman)	Men's welterweight
Bronze	Pelle Pettersson; Holger Sundström	1964 Tokyo	Sailing	Men's star class
Gold	Björn Ferm	1968 Mexico City	Modern pentathlon	Men's individual
Gold	Jörgen Sundelin; Peter Sundelin; Ulf Sundelin	1968 Mexico City	Sailing	Men's 5 1/2 metre Class
Silver	Gösta Pettersson; Tomas Pettersson; Erik Pettersson; Sture Pettersson	1968 Mexico City	Cycling	Men's team time trial
Bronze	Gösta Pettersson	1968 Mexico City	Cycling	Men's road race
Gold	Ulrika Knape	1972 Munich	Diving	Women's 10 m platform
Gold	Ragnar Skanåker	1972 Munich	Shooting	Men's free pistol
Gold	Gunnar Larsson	1972 Munich	Swimming	Men's 200 m individual medley
Gold	Gunnar Larsson	1972 Munich	Swimming	Men's 400 m individual medley
Silver	Gunnar Jervill	1972 Munich	Archery	Men's individual
Silver	Ulrika Knape	1972 Munich	Diving	Women's 3 m springboard
Silver	Rolf Peterson	1972 Munich	Canoeing	Men's K1 1000 m
Silver	Jan Karlsson	1972 Munich	Wrestling (freestyle)	Men's welterweight
Silver	Pelle Pettersson; Stellan Westerdahl	1972 Munich	Sailing	Men's star class
Silver	Bo Knape; Stefan Krook; Lennart Roslund; Stig Wennerström	1972 Munich	Sailing	Men's soling class
Bronze	Rickard Bruch	1972 Munich	Athletics	Men's discus throw
Bronze	Hasse Thomsén	1972 Munich	Boxing	Men's heavyweight
Bronze	Jan Jönsson	1972 Munich	Equestrian	Individual eventing
Bronze	Ulla Håkanson; Ninna Swaab; Maud von Rosen	1972 Munich	Equestrian	Team dressage
Bronze	Hans Bettembourg	1972 Munich	Weightlifting	Men's middle heavyweight
Bronze	Jan Karlsson	1972 Munich	Wrestling (Greco-Roman)	Men's welterweight
Gold	Anders Gärderud	1976 Montreal	Athletics	Men's 3000 m steeplechase
Gold	Bernt Johansson	1976 Montreal	Cycling	Men's individual road race
Gold	Hans Jacobson; Carl von Essen; Rolf Edling; Göran Flodström; Leif Högström	1976 Montreal	Fencing	Men's team épée
Gold	John Albrechtson; Ingvar Hansson	1976 Montreal	Sailing	Tempest class
Silver	Ulrika Knape	1976 Montreal	Diving	Women's 10 m platform
Gold	Johan Harmenberg	1980 Moscow	Fencing	Men's épée individual
Gold	Bengt Baron	1980 Moscow	Swimming	Men's 100 m backstroke
Gold	Pär Arvidsson	1980 Moscow	Swimming	Men's 100 m butterfly
Silver	Per Holmertz	1980 Moscow	Swimming	Men's 100 m freestyle
Silver	Lars-Göran Carlsson	1980 Moscow	Shooting	Men's skeet
Silver	Agneta Eriksson; Tina Gustafsson; Carina Ljungdahl; Agneta Mårtensson	1980 Moscow	Swimming	Women's 4x100 m freestyle relay
Bronze	Per Johansson	1980 Moscow	Swimming	Men's 100 m freestyle
Bronze	Sven Johansson	1980 Moscow	Shooting	Men's small-bore rifle, three positions
Bronze	Benni Ljungbeck	1980 Moscow	Wrestling (Greco-Roman)	Men's Bantamweight
Bronze	Lars-Erik Skiöld	1980 Moscow	Wrestling (Greco-Roman)	Men's Lightweight
Bronze	Göran Marström; Jörgen Ragnarsson	1980 Moscow	Sailing	Men's Tornado Team Competition
Bronze	George Horvath; Svante Rasmuson; Lennart Pettersson	1980 Moscow	Modern pentathlon	Men's Team Competition
Gold	Agneta Andersson	1984 Los Angeles	Canoeing	Women's K1 500 m
Gold	Agneta Andersson; Anna Olsson	1984 Los Angeles	Canoeing	Women's K2 500 m
Silver	Svante Rasmuson	1984 Los Angeles	Modern pentathlon	Men's individual
Silver	Bo Gustafsson	1984 Los Angeles	Athletics	Men's 50 km Walk
Silver	Patrik Sjöberg	1984 Los Angeles	Athletics	Men's High Jump
Silver	Lars-Erik Moberg	1984 Los Angeles	Canoeing	Men's K1 500 m
Silver	Per-Inge Bengtsson; Lars-Erik Moberg	1984 Los Angeles	Canoeing	Men's K2 500 m
Silver	Per-Inge Bengtsson; Tommy Karls; Thomas Ohlsson; Lars-Erik Moberg	1984 Los Angeles	Canoeing	Men's K4 1000 m
Silver	Agneta Andersson; Susanne Gunnarsson-Wiberg; Eva Karlsson; Anna Olsson	1984 Los Angeles	Canoeing	Women's K4 500 m
Silver	Björne Väggö	1984 Los Angeles	Fencing	Men's Épée Individual
Silver	Ragnar Skanåker	1984 Los Angeles	Shooting	Men's Free Pistol
Silver	Kent-Olle Johansson	1984 Los Angeles	Wrestling (Greco-Roman)	Men's Featherweight
Silver	Roger Tallroth	1984 Los Angeles	Wrestling (Greco-Roman)	Men's Welterweight
Bronze	Kenth Eldebrink	1984 Los Angeles	Athletics	Men's Javelin Throw
Bronze	Ingamay Bylund; Ulla Håkanson; Louise Nathhorst	1984 Los Angeles	Equestrian	Team dressage
Bronze	Per Johansson	1984 Los Angeles	Swimming	Men's 100 m freestyle
Bronze	Bengt Baron; Per Johansson; Thomas Lejdström; Mikael Örn	1984 Los Angeles	Swimming	Men's 4 × 100 m freestyle relay
Bronze	Sören Claeson	1984 Los Angeles	Wrestling (Greco-Roman)	Men's Middleweight
Bronze	Frank Andersson	1984 Los Angeles	Wrestling (Greco-Roman)	Men's Light Heavyweight
Silver	George Cramne	1988 Seoul	Boxing	Men's lightweight
Silver	Ragnar Skanåker	1988 Seoul	Shooting	Men's free pistol
Silver	Anders Holmertz	1988 Seoul	Swimming	Men's 200 m freestyle
Silver	Birgitta Bengtsson; Marit Söderström	1988 Seoul	Sailing	Women's 470 class
Bronze	Patrik Sjöberg	1988 Seoul	Athletics	Men's high jump
Bronze	Lars Myrberg	1988 Seoul	Boxing	Men's light welterweight
Bronze	Michel Lafis; Anders Jarl; Björn Johansson; Jan Karlsson	1988 Seoul	Cycling	Men's Team Road Race
Bronze	Erik Lindh	1988 Seoul	Table tennis	Men's Singles
Bronze	Stefan Edberg	1988 Seoul	Tennis	Men's Singles
Bronze	Stefan Edberg; Anders Järryd	1988 Seoul	Tennis	Men's Doubles
Bronze	Tomas Johansson	1988 Seoul	Wrestling (Greco-Roman)	Men's Super Heavyweight
Gold	Jan-Ove Waldner	1992 Barcelona	Table tennis	Men's singles
Silver	Patrick Sjöberg	1992 Barcelona	Athletics	Men's high jump
Silver	Gunnar Olsson; Karl Sundqvist	1992 Barcelona	Canoeing	Men's K-2 1000 m
Silver	Handball team	1992 Barcelona	Handball	Men's competition
Silver	Anders Holmertz	1992 Barcelona	Swimming	Men's 200 m freestyle
Silver	Lars Frölander; Anders Holmertz; Christer Wallin; Tommy Werner	1992 Barcelona	Swimming	Men's 4x200 m freestyle relay
Silver	Tomas Johansson	1992 Barcelona	Wrestling (Greco-Roman)	Men's super heavyweight
Silver	Agneta Andersson; Susanne Gunnarsson	1992 Barcelona	Canoeing	Women's K-2 500 m
Bronze	Agneta Andersson; Maria Haglund; Anna Olsson; Susanne Rosenqvist	1992 Barcelona	Canoeing	Women's K-4 500 m
Bronze	Ragnar Skanåker	1992 Barcelona	Shooting	Men's 50m pistol (60 shots)
Bronze	Anders Holmertz	1992 Barcelona	Swimming	Men's 400 m freestyle
Bronze	Torbjörn Kornbakk	1992 Barcelona	Wrestling (Greco-Roman)	Men's welterweight
Gold	Ludmila Engquist	1996 Atlanta	Athletics	Women's 100 m hurdles
Gold	Susanne Gunnarsson; Agneta Andersson	1996 Atlanta	Canoeing	Women's K-2 500 m
Silver	Magnus Petersson	1996 Atlanta	Archery	Men's individual competition
Silver	Lars Frölander; Anders Holmertz; Anders Lyrbring; Christer Wallin	1996 Atlanta	Swimming	Men's 4 × 200 m freestyle relay
Silver	Handball team	1996 Atlanta	Handball	Men's competition
Bronze	Agneta Andersson; Ingela Ericsson; Anna Olsson; Susanne Rosenqvist	1996 Atlanta	Canoeing	Women's K-4 500 m
Bronze	Mikael Ljungberg	1996 Atlanta	Wrestling (Greco-Roman)	Men's heavyweight
Gold	Jonas Edman	2000 Sydney	Shooting	Men's 50 m rifle prone (60 shots)
Gold	Pia Hansen	2000 Sydney	Shooting	Women's double trap (120 targets)
Gold	Lars Frölander	2000 Sydney	Swimming	Men's 100 m butterfly
Gold	Mikael Ljungberg	2000 Sydney	Wrestling (Greco-Roman)	Men's 85–97 kg
Silver	Henrik Nilsson; Markus Oscarsson	2000 Sydney	Canoeing	Men's K-2 1000 m
Silver	Handball team	2000 Sydney	Handball	Men's competition
Silver	Therese Alshammar	2000 Sydney	Swimming	Women's 50 m freestyle
Silver	Therese Alshammar	2000 Sydney	Swimming	Women's 100 m freestyle
Silver	Jan-Ove Waldner	2000 Sydney	Table tennis	Men's singles
Bronze	Kajsa Bergqvist	2000 Sydney	Athletics	Women's high jump
Bronze	Fredrik Lööf	2000 Sydney	Sailing	Men's finn class
Bronze	Therese Alshammar; Louise Jöhncke; Anna-Karin Kammerling; Josefin Lillhage; Johanna Sjöberg; Malin Svahnström	2000 Sydney	Swimming	Women's 4x100 m freestyle relay
Gold	Stefan Holm	2004 Athens	Athletics	Men's high jump
Gold	Christian Olsson	2004 Athens	Athletics	Men's triple jump
Gold	Carolina Klüft	2004 Athens	Athletics	Women's heptathlon
Gold	Henrik Nilsson; Markus Oscarsson	2004 Athens	Canoeing	Men's K-2 1000 m
Silver	Ara Abrahamian	2004 Athens	Wrestling (Greco-Roman)	Men's 74–84 kg
Silver	Rolf-Göran Bengtsson; Malin Baryard; Peter Eriksson; Peder Fredricson	2004 Athens	Equestrian	Team jumping
Bronze	Therese Torgersson; Vendela Zachrisson	2004 Athens	Sailing	Women's 470 class
Silver	Emma Johansson	2008 Beijing	Cycling	Women's road race
Silver	Gustav Larsson	2008 Beijing	Cycling	Men's road time trial
Silver	Rolf-Göran Bengtsson	2008 Beijing	Equestrian	Individual jumping
Silver	Simon Aspelin; Thomas Johansson	2008 Beijing	Tennis	Men's Doubles
Bronze	Anders Ekström; Fredrik Lööf	2008 Beijing	Sailing	Star class
Gold	Fredrik Lööf; Max Salminen	2012 London	Sailing	Star class
Silver	Sara Algotsson Ostholt	2012 London	Equestrian	Individual eventing
Silver	Håkan Dahlby	2012 London	Shooting	Men's double trap
Silver	Lisa Nordén	2012 London	Triathlon	Women's
Silver	Men's handball team	2012 London	Handball	Men's tournament
Bronze	Rasmus Myrgren	2012 London	Sailing	Men's Laser class
Bronze	Johan Eurén	2012 London	Wrestling (Greco-Roman)	Men's Greco-Roman 120 kg
Bronze	Jimmy Lidberg	2012 London	Wrestling (Greco-Roman)	Men's Greco-Roman 96 kg
Gold	Sarah Sjöström	2016 Rio de Janeiro	Swimming	Women's 100 m butterfly
Gold	Jenny Rissveds	2016 Rio de Janeiro	Cycling	Women's cross-country
Silver	Emma Johansson	2016 Rio de Janeiro	Cycling	Women's road race
Silver	Sarah Sjöström	2016 Rio de Janeiro	Swimming	Women's 200 m freestyle
Silver	Marcus Svensson	2016 Rio de Janeiro	Shooting	Men's skeet
Silver	Henrik Stenson	2016 Rio de Janeiro	Golf	Men's individual
Silver	Peder Fredricson	2016 Rio de Janeiro	Equestrian	Individual jumping
Silver	Sweden women's national football team: Hedvig Lindahl; Jonna Andersson; Linda Sembrant; Emma Berglund; Nilla Fischer; Magdalena Eriksson; Lisa Dahlkvist; Lotta Schelin; Kosovare Asllani; Sofia Jakobsson; Stina Blackstenius; Olivia Schough; Fridolina Rolfö; Emilia Appelqvist; Jessica Samuelsson; Elin Rubensson; Caroline Seger; Hilda Carlén; Pauline Hammarlund	2016 Rio de Janeiro	Football	Women's tournament
Bronze	Sarah Sjöström	2016 Rio de Janeiro	Swimming	Women's 100 m freestyle
Bronze	Jenny Fransson	2016 Rio de Janeiro	Wrestling (freestyle)	Women's freestyle 69 kg
Bronze	Sofia Mattsson	2016 Rio de Janeiro	Wrestling (freestyle)	Women's freestyle 53 kg
Gold	Armand Duplantis	2020 Tokyo	Athletics	Men's pole vault
Gold	Daniel Ståhl	2020 Tokyo	Athletics	Men's discus throw
Gold	Malin Baryard-Johnsson; Henrik von Eckermann; Peder Fredricson	2020 Tokyo	Equestrian	Team jumping
Silver	Simon Pettersson	2020 Tokyo	Athletics	Men's discus throw
Silver	Sarah Sjöström	2020 Tokyo	Swimming	Women's 50 metre freestyle
Silver	Josefin Olsson	2020 Tokyo	Sailing	Women's Laser Radial
Silver	Peder Fredricson	2020 Tokyo	Equestrian	Individual jumping
Silver	Sweden women's national football team: Hedvig Lindahl; Jonna Andersson; Emma Kullberg; Hanna Glas; Hanna Bennison; Magdalena Eriksson; Madelen Janogy; Lina Hurtig; Kosovare Asllani; Sofia Jakobsson; Stina Blackstenius; Jennifer Falk; Amanda Ilestedt; Nathalie Björn; Olivia Schough; Filippa Angeldal; Caroline Seger; Fridolina Rolfö; Anna Anvegård; Julia Roddar; Rebecka Blomqvist; Zećira Mušović	2020 Tokyo	Football	Women's tournament

== Winter Olympics ==
Medal	Name	Games	Sport	Event
Gold	Gillis Grafström	1924 Chamonix	Figure skating	Men's singles
Silver	Sweden men's national curling team: Carl August Kronlund; Carl Wilhelm Petersén; Carl Axel Petterson; Erik Severin; Karl Wahlberg; Victor Wetterström; Johan Petter Åhlén; Ture Ödlund	1924 Chamonix	Curling	Men's competition
Gold	Per-Erik Hedlund	1928 St. Moritz	Cross-country skiing	Men's 50 km
Gold	Gillis Grafström	1928 St. Moritz	Figure skating	Men's singles
Silver	Gustaf Jonsson	1928 St. Moritz	Cross-country skiing	Men's 50 km
Silver	Sweden men's national ice hockey team: Carl Abrahamsson; Emil Bergman; Birger Holmqvist; Gustaf Johansson; Henry Johansson; Nils Johansson; Ernst Karlberg; Erik Larsson; Bertil Linde; Wilhelm Petersén; Kurt Sucksdorff; Sigfrid Öberg	1928 St. Moritz	Ice hockey	Men's competition
Bronze	Volger Andersson	1928 St. Moritz	Cross-country skiing	Men's 50 km
Gold	Sven Utterström	1932 Lake Placid	Cross-country skiing	Men's 18 km
Silver	Axel Wikström	1932 Lake Placid	Cross-country skiing	Men's 18 km
Silver	Gillis Grafström	1932 Lake Placid	Figure skating	Men's singles
Gold	Erik August Larsson	1936 Garmisch-Partenkirchen	Cross-country skiing	Men's 18 km
Gold	Elis Wiklund	1936 Garmisch-Partenkirchen	Cross-country skiing	Men's 50 km
Silver	Axel Wikström	1936 Garmisch-Partenkirchen	Cross-country skiing	Men's 50 km
Silver	Sven Eriksson	1936 Garmisch-Partenkirchen	Ski jumping	Large hill
Bronze	Nils-Joel Englund	1936 Garmisch-Partenkirchen	Cross-country skiing	Men's 50 km
Bronze	John Berger; Arthur Häggblad; Erik August Larsson; Martin Matsbo	1936 Garmisch-Partenkirchen	Cross-country skiing	Men's 4 × 10 km relay
Bronze	Vivi-Anne Hultén	1936 Garmisch-Partenkirchen	Figure skating	Ladies' singles
Gold	Martin Lundström	1948 St. Moritz	Cross-country skiing	Men's 18 km
Gold	Nils Karlsson	1948 St. Moritz	Cross-country skiing	Men's 50 km
Gold	Gunnar Eriksson; Martin Lundström; Nils Östensson; Nils Täpp	1948 St. Moritz	Cross-country skiing	Men's 4 × 10 km relay
Gold	Åke Seyffarth	1948 St. Moritz	Speed skating	Men's 10000 m
Silver	Harald Eriksson	1948 St. Moritz	Cross-country skiing	Men's 50 km
Silver	Nils Östensson	1948 St. Moritz	Cross-country skiing	Men's 18 km
Silver	Åke Seyffarth	1948 St. Moritz	Speed skating	Men's 1500 m
Bronze	Gunnar Eriksson	1948 St. Moritz	Cross-country skiing	Men's 18 km
Bronze	Sven Israelsson	1948 St. Moritz	Nordic combined	Individual competition
Bronze	Göthe Hedlund	1948 St. Moritz	Speed skating	Men's 5000 m
Bronze	Nils Täpp; Sigurd Andersson; Enar Josefsson; Martin Lundström	1952 Oslo	Cross-country skiing	Men's 4 × 10 km relay
Bronze	Sweden men's national ice hockey team: Göte Almqvist; Hans Andersson; Stig Andersson; Åke Andersson; Lasse Björn; Göte Blomqvist; Thord Flodqvist; Erik Johansson; Gösta Johansson; Rune Johansson; Sven "Tumba" Johansson; Åke Lassas; Holger Nurmela; Lars Pettersson; Lars Svensson; Sven Thunman; Hans Öberg	1952 Oslo	Ice hockey	Men's competition
Bronze	Karl Holmström	1952 Oslo	Ski jumping	Individual large hill
Bronze	Carl-Erik Asplund	1952 Oslo	Speed skating	Men's 10000 m
Gold	Sixten Jernberg	1956 Cortina d'Ampezzo	Cross-country skiing	Men's 50 km
Gold	Sigvard Ericsson	1956 Cortina d'Ampezzo	Speed skating	Men's 10000 m
Silver	Sixten Jernberg	1956 Cortina d'Ampezzo	Cross-country skiing	Men's 15 km
Silver	Sixten Jernberg	1956 Cortina d'Ampezzo	Cross-country skiing	Men's 30 km
Silver	Bengt Eriksson	1956 Cortina d'Ampezzo	Nordic combined	Men's Individual
Silver	Sigvard Ericsson	1956 Cortina d'Ampezzo	Speed skating	Men's 5000 m
Bronze	Stig Sollander	1956 Cortina d'Ampezzo	Alpine skiing	Men's slalom
Bronze	Lennart Larsson; Gunnar Samuelsson; Per-Erik Larsson; Sixten Jernberg	1956 Cortina d'Ampezzo	Cross-country skiing	Men's 4 × 10 km relay
Bronze	Sonja Edström	1956 Cortina d'Ampezzo	Cross-country skiing	Women's 10 km
Bronze	Irma Johansson; Anna-Lisa Eriksson; Sonja Edström	1956 Cortina d'Ampezzo	Cross-country skiing	Women's 3 × 5 km relay
Gold	Klas Lestander	1960 Squaw Valley	Biathlon	Men's 20 km
Gold	Sixten Jernberg	1960 Squaw Valley	Cross-country skiing	Men's 30 km
Gold	Irma Johansson; Britt Strandberg; Sonja Ruthström-Edström	1960 Squaw Valley	Cross-country skiing	Women's 3 × 5 km relay
Silver	Sixten Jernberg	1960 Squaw Valley	Cross-country skiing	Men's 15 km
Silver	Rolf Rämgård	1960 Squaw Valley	Cross-country skiing	Men's 30 km
Bronze	Rolf Rämgård	1960 Squaw Valley	Cross-country skiing	Men's 50 km
Bronze	Kjell Bäckman	1960 Squaw Valley	Speed skating	Men's 10000 m
Gold	Sixten Jernberg	1964 Innsbruck	Cross-country skiing	Men's 50 km
Gold	Karl-Åke Asph; Sixten Jernberg; Janne Stefansson; Assar Rönnlund	1964 Innsbruck	Cross-country skiing	Men's 4 × 10 km relay
Gold	Jonny Nilsson	1964 Innsbruck	Speed skating	Men's 10000 m
Silver	Assar Rönnlund	1964 Innsbruck	Cross-country skiing	Men's 50 km
Silver	Barbro Martinsson; Britt Strandberg; Toini Gustafsson	1964 Innsbruck	Cross-country skiing	Women's 3 × 5 km relay
Silver	Sweden men's national ice hockey team: Anders Andersson; Gert Blomé; Lennart Häggroth; Lennart Johansson; Nils Johansson; Sven "Tumba" Johansson; Lars-Eric Lundvall; Hans Mild; Eilert Määttä; Nils Nilsson; Bert-Ola Nordlander; Ronald Pettersson; Ulf Sterner; Roland Stoltz; Kjell Svensson; Carl-Göran Öberg; Uno Öhrlund	1964 Innsbruck	Ice hockey	Men's tournament
Bronze	Sixten Jernberg	1964 Innsbruck	Cross-country skiing	Men's 15 km
Gold	Toini Gustafsson	1968 Grenoble	Cross-country skiing	Women's 5 km
Gold	Toini Gustafsson	1968 Grenoble	Cross-country skiing	Women's 10 km
Gold	Johnny Höglin	1968 Grenoble	Speed skating	Men's 10000 m
Silver	Jan Halvarsson; Bjarne Andersson; Gunnar Larsson; Assar Rönnlund	1968 Grenoble	Cross-country skiing	Men's 4 × 10 km relay
Silver	Britt Strandberg; Toini Gustafsson; Barbro Martinsson	1968 Grenoble	Cross-country skiing	Women's 3 × 5 km relay
Bronze	Lars-Göran Arwidson; Tore Eriksson; Olle Petrusson; Holmfrid Olsson	1968 Grenoble	Biathlon	Men's 4 × 7,5 km relay
Bronze	Gunnar Larsson	1968 Grenoble	Cross-country skiing	Men's 15 km
Bronze	Örjan Sandler	1968 Grenoble	Speed skating	Men's 10000 m
Gold	Sven-Åke Lundbäck	1972 Sapporo	Cross-country skiing	Men's 15 km
Silver	Hasse Börjes	1972 Sapporo	Speed skating	Men's 500 m
Bronze	Lars-Göran Arwidson	1972 Sapporo	Biathlon	Men's 20 km
Bronze	Göran Claeson	1972 Sapporo	Speed skating	Men's 1500 m
Bronze	Ingemar Stenmark	1976 Innsbruck	Alpine skiing	Men's giant slalom
Bronze	Benny Södergren	1976 Innsbruck	Cross-country skiing	Men's 50 km
Gold	Ingemar Stenmark	1980 Lake Placid	Alpine skiing	Men's giant slalom
Gold	Ingemar Stenmark	1980 Lake Placid	Alpine skiing	Men's slalom
Gold	Thomas Wassberg	1980 Lake Placid	Cross-country skiing	Men's 15 km
Bronze	Sweden men's national ice hockey team: Sture Andersson; Bo Berglund; Håkan Eriksson; Jan Eriksson; Thomas Eriksson; Leif Holmgren; Tomas Jonsson; Pelle Lindbergh; Bengt Lundholm; Per Lundqvist; Harald Lückner; William Löfqvist; Lars Molin; Lennart Norberg; Mats Näslund; Tommy Samuelsson; Dan Söderström; Mats Waltin; Ulf Weinstock; Mats Åhlberg	1980 Lake Placid	Ice hockey	Men's competition
Gold	Gunde Svan	1984 Sarajevo	Cross-country skiing	Men's 15 km
Gold	Thomas Wassberg	1984 Sarajevo	Cross-country skiing	Men's 50 km
Gold	Thomas Wassberg; Benny Kohlberg; Jan Ottosson; Gunde Svan	1984 Sarajevo	Cross-country skiing	Men's 4 × 10 km relay
Gold	Tomas Gustafson	1984 Sarajevo	Speed skating	Men's 5000 m
Silver	Gunde Svan	1984 Sarajevo	Cross-country skiing	Men's 50 km
Silver	Tomas Gustafson	1984 Sarajevo	Speed skating	Men's 10000 m
Bronze	Gunde Svan	1984 Sarajevo	Cross-country skiing	Men's 30 km
Bronze	Sweden men's national ice hockey team: Pelle Eklund; Thom Eklund; Bo Ericson; Håkan Eriksson; Peter Gradin; Mats Hessel; Michael Hjälm; Göran Lindblom; Tommy Mörth; Håkan Nordin; Rolf Ridderwall; Thomas Rundqvist; Tomas Sandström; Håkan Södergren; Mats Thelin; Michael Thelvén; Mats Waltin; Göte Wälitalo; Thomas Åhlén; Jens Öhling	1984 Sarajevo	Ice hockey	Men's competition
Gold	Gunde Svan	1988 Calgary	Cross-country skiing	Men's 50 km freestyle
Gold	Jan Ottosson; Thomas Wassberg; Gunde Svan; Torgny Mogren	1988 Calgary	Cross-country skiing	Men's 4 × 10 km relay
Gold	Tomas Gustafson	1988 Calgary	Speed skating	Men's 5000 m
Gold	Tomas Gustafson	1988 Calgary	Speed skating	Men's 10000 m
Bronze	Lars-Börje Eriksson	1988 Calgary	Alpine skiing	Men's Super G
Bronze	Sweden men's national ice hockey team: Mikael Andersson; Peter Andersson; Bo Berglund; Anders Bergman; Jonas Bergqvist; Thom Eklund; Anders Eldebrink; Peter Eriksson; Thomas Eriksson; Michael Hjälm; Lars Ivarsson; Mikael Johansson; Lars Karlsson; Mats Kihlström; Peter Lindmark; Lars Molin; Lars-Gunnar Pettersson; Thomas Rundqvist; Tommy Samuelsson; Ulf Sandström; Håkan Södergren; Peter Åslin; Jens Öhling	1988 Calgary	Ice hockey	Men's competition
Gold	Pernilla Wiberg	1992 Albertville	Alpine skiing	Women's giant slalom
Bronze	Mikael Löfgren	1992 Albertville	Biathlon	Men's 20 km
Bronze	Ulf Johansson; Leif Andersson; Tord Wiksten; Mikael Löfgren	1992 Albertville	Biathlon	Men's 4 × 7,5 km relay
Bronze	Christer Majbäck	1992 Albertville	Cross-country skiing	Men's 10 km classical
Gold	Pernilla Wiberg	1994 Lillehammer	Alpine skiing	Women's combined
Gold	Sweden men's national ice hockey team: Charles Berglund; Jonas Bergqvist; Andreas Dackell; Christian Due-Boje; Niklas Eriksson; Peter Forsberg; Roger Hansson; Roger Johansson; Tomas Jonsson; Patrik Juhlin; Jörgen Jönsson; Kenny Jönsson; Håkan Loob; Mats Näslund; Leif Rohlin; Daniel Rydmark; Tommy Salo; Fredrik Stillman; Michael Sundlöv; Magnus Svensson; Stefan Örnskog	1994 Lillehammer	Ice hockey	Men's competition
Silver	Marie Lindgren	1994 Lillehammer	Freestyle skiing	Women's aerial
Silver	Pernilla Wiberg	1998 Nagano	Alpine skiing	Women's downhill
Silver	Niklas Jonsson	1998 Nagano	Cross-country skiing	Men's 50 km freestyle
Bronze	Sweden women's national curling team: Elisabet Gustafson; Margaretha Lindahl; Louise Marmont; Katarina Nyberg; Elisabeth Persson	1998 Nagano	Curling	Women's competition
Silver	Anja Pärson	2002 Salt Lake City	Alpine skiing	Women's giant slalom
Silver	Richard Richardsson	2002 Salt Lake City	Snowboarding	Men's parallel giant slalom
Bronze	Anja Pärson	2002 Salt Lake City	Alpine skiing	Women's slalom
Bronze	Magdalena Forsberg	2002 Salt Lake City	Biathlon	Women's 7.5 km sprint
Bronze	Magdalena Forsberg	2002 Salt Lake City	Biathlon	Women's 10 km pursuit
Bronze	Per Elofsson	2002 Salt Lake City	Cross-country skiing	Men's 20 km pursuit
Bronze	Sweden women's national ice hockey team: Lotta Almblad; Anna Andersson; Gunilla Andersson; Emelie Berggren; Kristina Bergstrand; Ann-Louise Edstrand; Joa Elfsberg; Erika Holst; Nanna Jansson; Maria Larsson; Ylva Lindberg; Ulrica Lindström; Kim Martin; Josefin Pettersson; Maria Rooth; Danijela Rundqvist; Evelina Samuelsson; Therese Sjölander; Anna Vikman; Annica Åhlén	2002 Salt Lake City	Ice hockey	Women's competition
Gold	Anja Pärson	2006 Turin	Alpine skiing	Women's slalom
Gold	Anna Carin Olofsson	2006 Turin	Biathlon	Women's mass start
Gold	Ulrika Bergman; Cathrine Lindahl; Eva Lund; Anette Norberg; Anna Svärd	2006 Turin	Curling	Women's competition
Gold	Thobias Fredriksson; Björn Lind	2006 Turin	Cross-country skiing	Men's team sprint, classical style
Gold	Björn Lind	2006 Turin	Cross-country skiing	Men's individual sprint
Gold	Lina Andersson; Anna Dahlberg	2006 Turin	Cross-country skiing	Women's team sprint, classical style
Gold	Sweden men's national ice hockey team: Daniel Alfredsson; Per-Johan Axelsson; Christian Bäckman; Peter Forsberg; Mika Hannula; Tomas Holmström; Niclas Hävelid; Jörgen Jönsson; Kenny Jönsson; Niklas Kronwall; Nicklas Lidström; Stefan Liv; Henrik Lundqvist; Fredrik Modin; Samuel Påhlsson; Mikael Samuelsson; Daniel Sedin; Henrik Sedin; Mats Sundin; Ronnie Sundin; Mikael Tellqvist; Daniel Tjärnqvist; Henrik Zetterberg; Mattias Öhlund	2006 Turin	Ice hockey	Men's competition
Silver	Anna Carin Olofsson	2006 Turin	Biathlon	Women's sprint
Silver	Sweden women's national ice hockey team: Cecilia Andersson; Gunilla Andersson; Jenni Asserholt; Ann-Louise Edstrand; Joa Elfsberg; Emma Eliasson; Erika Holst; Nanna Jansson; Jenny Lindqvist; Kristina Lundberg; Kim Martin; Frida Nevalainen; Emilie O'Konor; Maria Rooth; Danijela Rundqvist; Therese Sjölander; Katarina Timglas; Anna Vikman; Pernilla Winberg	2006 Turin	Ice hockey	Women's competition
Bronze	Anja Pärson	2006 Turin	Alpine skiing	Women's downhill
Bronze	Anja Pärson	2006 Turin	Alpine skiing	Women's combined
Bronze	Anna Ottosson	2006 Turin	Alpine skiing	Women's giant slalom
Bronze	Mathias Fredriksson; Mats Larsson; Johan Olsson; Anders Södergren	2006 Turin	Cross-country skiing	Men's 4 × 10 km relay
Bronze	Thobias Fredriksson	2006 Turin	Cross-country skiing	Men's individual sprint
Gold	Björn Ferry	2010 Vancouver	Biathlon	Men's pursuit
Gold	Charlotte Kalla	2010 Vancouver	Cross-country skiing	Women's 10 km freestyle
Gold	Marcus Hellner	2010 Vancouver	Cross-country skiing	Men's 30 kilometre pursuit
Gold	Daniel Richardsson; Johan Olsson; Anders Södergren; Marcus Hellner	2010 Vancouver	Cross-country skiing	Men's 4 × 10 km relay
Gold	Kajsa Bergström; Cathrine Lindahl; Eva Lund; Anette Norberg; Anna Le Moine	2010 Vancouver	Curling	Women's competition
Silver	Anna Haag	2010 Vancouver	Cross-country skiing	Women's 15 kilometre pursuit
Silver	Anna Haag; Charlotte Kalla	2010 Vancouver	Cross-country skiing	Women's team sprint, freestyle
Bronze	Anja Pärson	2010 Vancouver	Alpine skiing	Women's combined
Bronze	André Myhrer	2010 Vancouver	Alpine skiing	Men's slalom
Bronze	Johan Olsson	2010 Vancouver	Cross-country skiing	Men's 30 kilometre pursuit
Bronze	Johan Olsson	2010 Vancouver	Cross-country skiing	Men's 50 kilometre classical
Gold	Anna Haag; Ida Ingemarsdotter; Charlotte Kalla; Emma Wikén	2014 Sochi	Cross-country skiing	Women's 4 × 5 km relay
Gold	Marcus Hellner; Lars Nelson; Johan Olsson; Daniel Richardsson	2014 Sochi	Cross-country skiing	Men's 4 × 10 km relay
Silver	Charlotte Kalla	2014 Sochi	Cross-country skiing	Women's 15 km skiathlon
Silver	Marcus Hellner	2014 Sochi	Cross-country skiing	Men's 30 km skiathlon
Silver	Teodor Peterson	2014 Sochi	Cross-country skiing	Men's sprint
Silver	Charlotte Kalla	2014 Sochi	Cross-country skiing	Women's 10 km classical
Silver	Johan Olsson	2014 Sochi	Cross-country skiing	Men's 15 km classical
Silver	Christina Bertrup; Agnes Knochenhauer; Maria Prytz; Margaretha Sigfridsson; Maria Wennerström	2014 Sochi	Curling	Women's tournament
Silver	Sweden men's national ice hockey team: Daniel Alfredsson; Nicklas Bäckström; Patrik Berglund; Alexander Edler; Oliver Ekman-Larsson; Jhonas Enroth; Jimmie Ericsson; Jonathan Ericsson; Loui Eriksson; Jonas Gustavsson; Carl Hagelin; Niklas Hjalmarsson; Marcus Johansson; Erik Karlsson; Niklas Kronwall; Marcus Krüger; Gabriel Landeskog; Henrik Lundqvist; Gustav Nyquist; Johnny Oduya; Daniel Sedin; Jakob Silfverberg; Alexander Steen; Henrik Tallinder; Henrik Zetterberg	2014 Sochi	Ice hockey	Men's tournament
Bronze	Emil Jönsson	2014 Sochi	Cross-country skiing	Men's sprint
Bronze	Daniel Richardsson	2014 Sochi	Cross-country skiing	Men's 15 km classical
Bronze	Ida Ingemarsdotter; Stina Nilsson	2014 Sochi	Cross-country skiing	Women's team sprint
Bronze	Emil Jönsson; Teodor Peterson	2014 Sochi	Cross-country skiing	Men's team sprint
Bronze	Anna Holmlund	2014 Sochi	Freestyle skiing	Women's ski cross
Bronze	Niklas Edin; Oskar Eriksson; Sebastian Kraupp; Viktor Kjäll; Fredrik Lindberg	2014 Sochi	Curling	Men's tournament
Gold	Charlotte Kalla	2018 Pyeongchang	Cross-country skiing	Women's 15 km skiathlon
Gold	Stina Nilsson	2018 Pyeongchang	Cross-country skiing	Women's sprint
Gold	Hanna Öberg	2018 Pyeongchang	Biathlon	Women's individual
Gold	Frida Hansdotter	2018 Pyeongchang	Alpine skiing	Women's slalom
Gold	André Myhrer	2018 Pyeongchang	Alpine skiing	Men's slalom
Gold	Peppe Femling; Fredrik Lindström; Jesper Nelin; Sebastian Samuelsson	2018 Pyeongchang	Biathlon	Men's relay
Gold	Anna Hasselborg; Agnes Knochenhauer; Sofia Mabergs; Sara McManus; Jennie Wåhlin	2018 Pyeongchang	Curling	Women's tournament
Silver	Sebastian Samuelsson	2018 Pyeongchang	Biathlon	Men's pursuit
Silver	Charlotte Kalla	2018 Pyeongchang	Cross-country skiing	Women's 10 km freestyle
Silver	Ebba Andersson; Anna Haag; Charlotte Kalla; Stina Nilsson	2018 Pyeongchang	Cross-country skiing	Women's 4×5 km relay
Silver	Charlotte Kalla; Stina Nilsson	2018 Pyeongchang	Cross-country skiing	Women's team sprint
Silver	Mona Brorsson; Linn Persson; Anna Magnusson; Hanna Öberg	2018 Pyeongchang	Biathlon	Women's relay
Silver	Niklas Edin; Oskar Eriksson; Henrik Leek; Christoffer Sundgren; Rasmus Wranå	2018 Pyeongchang	Curling	Men's tournament
Bronze	Stina Nilsson	2018 Pyeongchang	Cross-country skiing	Women's 30 km classical

== Summer Youth Olympics ==
Medal	Name	Games	Sport	Event
Gold	Angelica Bengtsson	2010 Singapore	Athletics	Girls' pole vault
Gold	Khadijatou Sagnia	2010 Singapore	Athletics	Girls' triple jump
Bronze	Jennifer Ågren	2010 Singapore	Taekwondo	Girls' 55kg
Bronze	Heidi Schmidt	2010 Singapore	Athletics	Girls' discus throw
Bronze	Jonna Adlerteg	2010 Singapore	Gymnstics	Girls' uneven bars
Gold	Marcus Kinhult; Linnea Ström	2014 Nanjing	Golf	Mixed team
Silver	Linus Islas Flygare	2014 Nanjing	Fencing	Boys' individual épée
Silver	Marcus Kinhult	2014 Nanjing	Golf	Boys' individual
Bronze	Åsa Linde	2014 Nanjing	Fencing	Girls' individual épée
Bronze	Women's national U18 team	2014 Nanjing	Handball	Girls' tournament
Bronze	Agnes Alexiusson	2014 Nanjing	Boxing	Girls' 60 kg
Gold	Sara Junevik	2018 Buenos Aires	Swimming	Girls' 50 m butterfly
Gold	Jonna Malmgren	2018 Buenos Aires	Wrestling	Girls' freestyle 49 kg
Gold	Jonatan Hellvig; David Åhman	2018 Buenos Aires	Beach volleyball	Boys' tournament
Silver	Robin Hanson	2018 Buenos Aires	Swimming	Boys' 200 m freestyle
Silver	Elin Lindroth	2018 Buenos Aires	Rowing	Girls' single sculls
Bronze	Robin Hanson	2018 Buenos Aires	Swimming	Boys' 100 m freestyle

== Winter Youth Olympics ==
Medal	Name	Games	Sport	Event
Gold	Magdalena Fjällström	2012 Innsbruck	Alpine skiing	Girls' combined
Gold	Sweden women's national under-18 ice hockey team: Emmy Alasalmi; Kristin Andersson; Matildah Andersson; Sara Besseling; Lina Bäcklin; Johanna Eidensten; Wilma Ekström; Maria Fuhrberg; Jessica Hjort; Rebecca Höglund; Anna Johansson; Anna Kjellbin; Sabina Küller; Cajsa Lillbäck; Amanda Lindberg; Linn Petersson; Malin Wong	2012 Innsbruck	Ice hockey	Girls' tournament
Silver	Fredrik Bauer	2012 Innsbruck	Alpine skiing	Boys' super-G
Silver	Jonna Sundling	2012 Innsbruck	Cross-country skiing	Girls' sprint
