= List of ice hockey players awarded Stora Grabbars och Tjejers Märke =

Stora grabbars och tjejers märke (lit. Big Boys' and Girls' Badge) is an honorary award within Swedish sports, created in 1928 by Bo Ekelund. The recipients are called a 'Stor Grabb' (lit. Big Boy) and has to gather a certain number of points according to different rules depending on the sport in question. The title is awarded in several different sports, such as ice hockey, football, athletics, free diving, miniature golf, and others. Since 1989, women can also gain the title, then called Stora tjejers märke (lit. Big Girls' Badge), and the recipient is called a 'Stor tjej' (lit. Big Girl).

== Recipients ==
=== Men ===
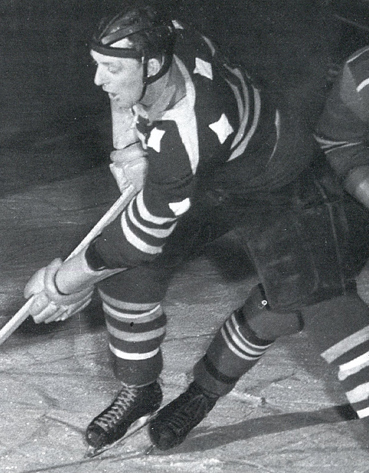
Åke Andersson was awarded Stor grabb number 24.

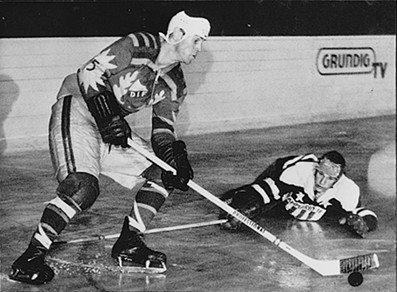
Sven Tumba was awarded Stor grabb number 36.

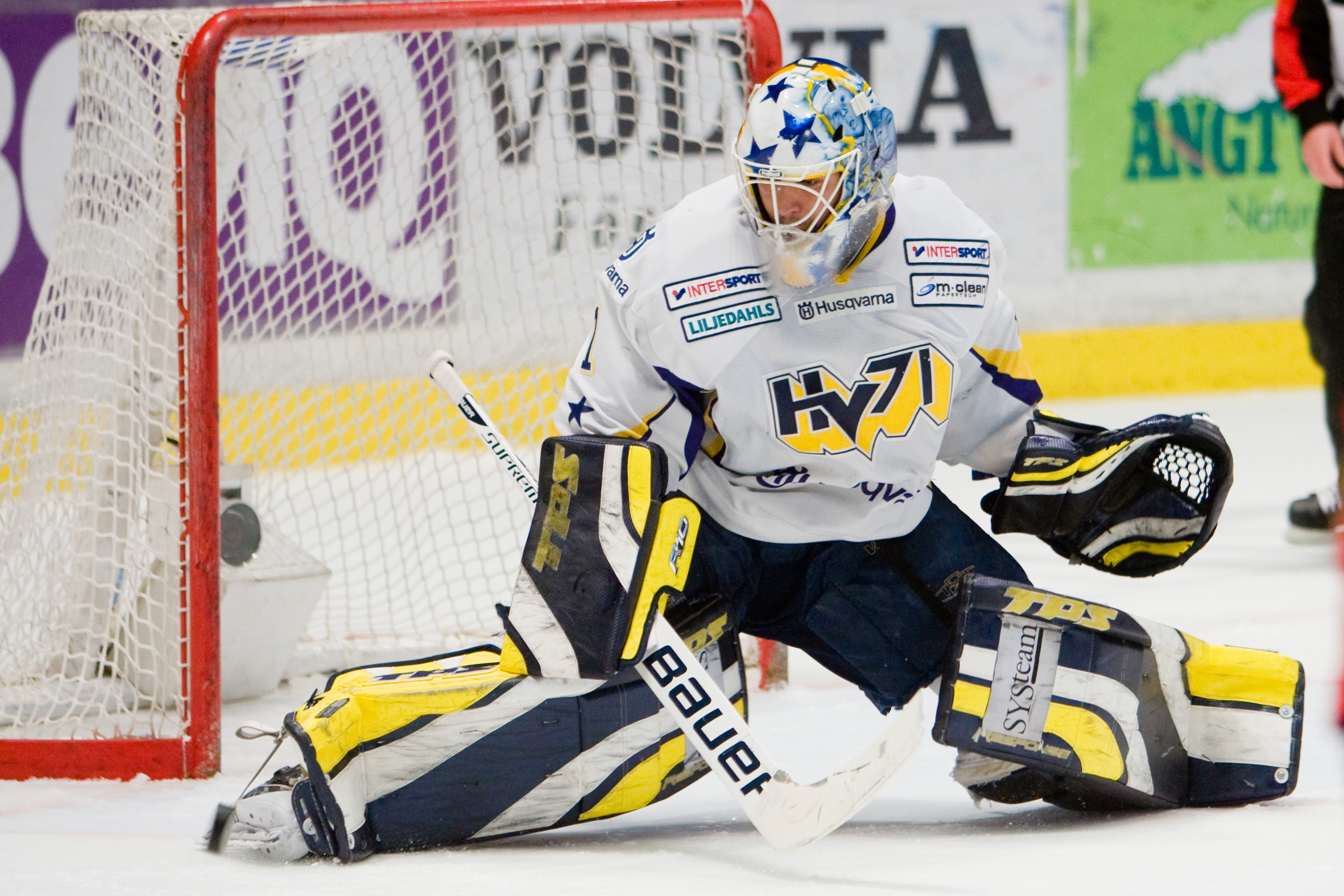
Stefan Liv was awarded Stor grabb number 164.

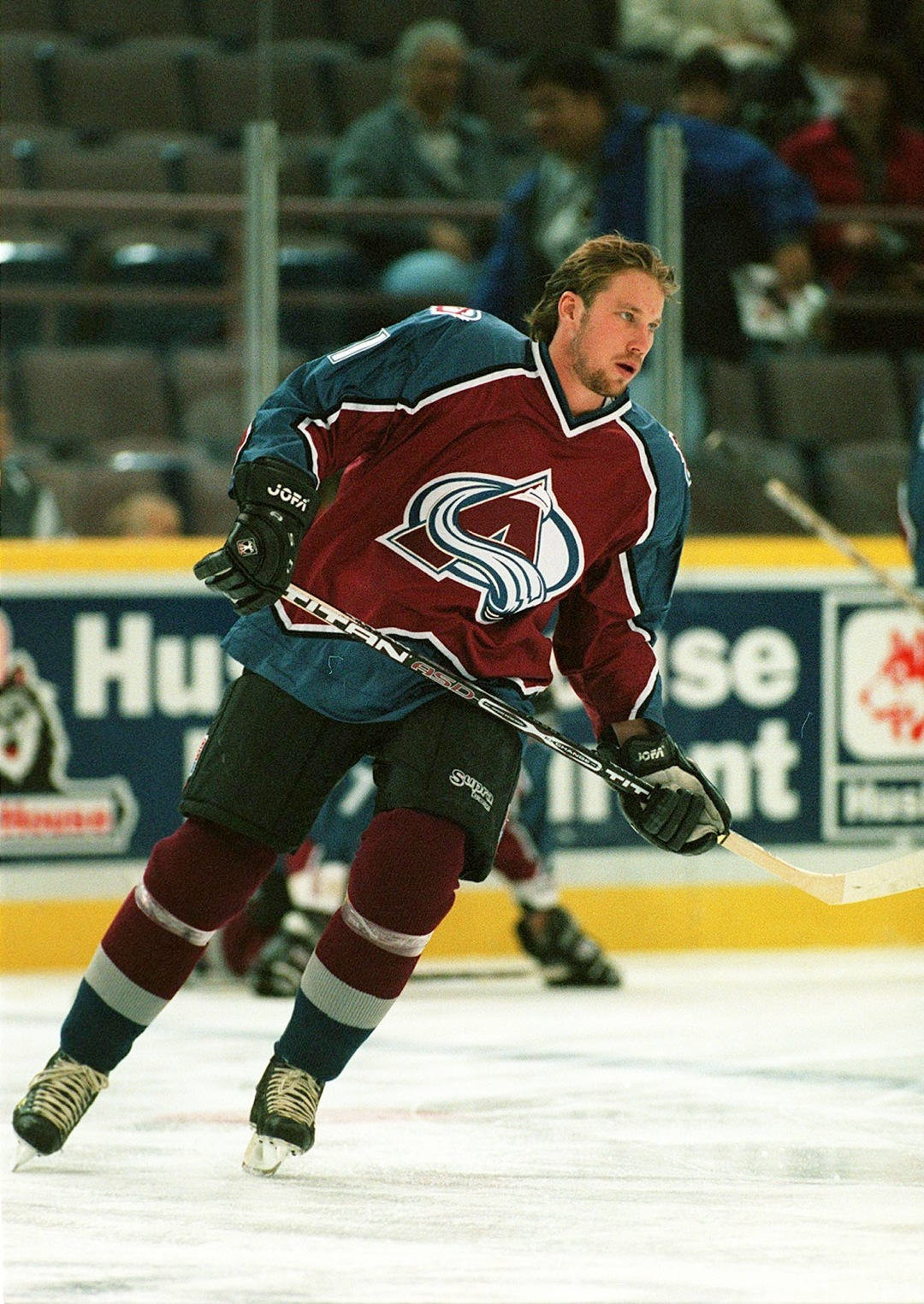
Peter Forsberg was awarded Stor grabb number 165.

As of 26 March 2023

No	Player	Year	Club(s)
1	Nils Molander		Berliner SC
2	Einar Svensson		Göta
3	Einar Lundell		Göta
4	Erik Burman		Göta
5	Georg Johansson		Göta
6	Wilhelm Arwe		Djurgården
7	Birger Holmqvist		Göta
8	Gustaf Johansson		Göta
9	Carl Abrahamsson		Södertälje
10	Sigfrid Öberg		Hammarby
11	Erik Larsson		Hammarby
12	Wilhelm Petersén		AIK
13	Herman Carlson		AIK
14	Bertil Lundell		Hammarby
15	Sven Bergqvist		Hammarby
16	Albin Jansson		Järva
17	Kurt Sucksdorff		Göta
18	Erik Lindgren		Djurgården
19	Yngve Liljeberg		Göta
20	Torsten Jöhncke		Göta
21	Åke Ericson		Göta
22	Stig Emanuel Andersson		Hammarby
23	Kurt Svanberg		AIK
24	Åke Andersson		Hammarby
25	Folke Jansson		Södertälje
26	Arne Johansson		Södertälje
27	Olle Andersson		Hermes
28	Holger Nurmela		Hammarby
29	Rune Johansson		Hammarby
30	Sven Thunman		Södertälje
31	Erik Johansson		Södertälje
32	Gösta Johansson		Djurgården
33	Stig Carlsson		Södertälje
34	Hans Öberg		Gävle Godtemplare
35	Lasse Björn		Djurgården
36	Sven Tumba		Djurgården
37	Thord Flodqvist		Södertälje
38	Sigurd Bröms		Leksand
39	Göte Blomqvist		Södertälje
40	Hans Isaksson		Gävle Godtemplare
41	Åke Lassas		Leksand
42	Rolf Pettersson		Hammarby
43	Lars Svensson		Matteuspojkarna
44	Hans Andersson-Tvilling		Djurgården
45	Stig Andersson-Tvilling		Djurgården
46	Göte Almqvist		Skellefteå
47	Lars-Eric Lundvall		Västra Frölunda
48	Vilgot Larsson		Leksand
49	Nils Nilsson		Leksand
50	Ronald Pettersson		Västra Frölunda
51	Hans Svedberg		Skellefteå
52	Roland Stoltz		Djurgården
53	Eje Lindström		Wifsta/Östrand
54	Acka Andersson		Skellefteå
55	Gert Blomé		Västra Frölunda
56	Bertil Karlsson		Strömsbro
57	Eilert Määttä		Södertälje
58	Bert-Ola Nordlander		AIK
59	Ulf Sterner		Färjestad
60	Kjell Svensson		Södertälje
61	Carl-Göran Öberg		Djurgården
62	Uno Öhrlund		Västerås IK
63	Hans Mild		Djurgården
64	Lennart Häggroth		Skellefteå
65	Nils Johansson		MoDo
66	Leif Holmqvist		AIK
67	Björn Palmqvist		Djurgården
68	Folke Bengtsson		Leksand
69	Lars-Göran Nilsson		Brynäs
70	Tord Lundström		Brynäs
71	Lennart Svedberg		Timrå
72	Arne Carlsson		Södertälje
73	Leif Henriksson		Västra Frölunda
74	Håkan Wickberg		Brynäs
75	Lars-Erik Sjöberg		Västra Frölunda
76	Hans Lindberg		Brynäs
77	Stefan Karlsson		Brynäs
78	Stig-Göran Johansson		Södertälje
79	Kjell-Rune Milton		MoDo
80	Thommy Abrahamsson		Leksand
81	Håkan Nygren		MoDo
82	Rolf Eriksson-Hemlin		Södertälje
83	Inge Hammarström		Brynäs
84	Christer Abrahamsson		Leksand
85	Anders Hedberg		New York Rangers
86	Karl-Johan Sundqvist		Färjestad
87	Björn Johansson		Södertälje
88	Mats Åhlberg		Leksand
89	Dan Söderström		Leksand
90	William Löfqvist		Brynäs
91	Håkan Pettersson		Timrå
92	Stig Östling		Brynäs
93	Dan Labraaten		Leksand
94	Per-Olov Brasar		Leksand
95	Lars Pettersson		Västerås SK
96	Per-Olov Härdin		Strömsbro
97	Mats Waltin		Lugano
98	Göran Högosta		Västra Frölunda
99	Stig Salming		Brynäs
100	Hans Jax		Leksand
101	Ulf Weinstock		Leksand
102	Roland Eriksson		Leksand
103	Lars-Erik Ericsson		AIK
104	Lars-Gunnar Lundberg		Örebro IK
105	Martin Karlsson		Skellefteå
106	Leif Holmgren		AIK
107	Bengt Lundholm		Winnipeg Jets
108	Lennart Norberg		Björklöven
109	Mats Näslund		Malmö
110	Tomas Jonsson		Leksand
111	Ulf Nilsson		New York Rangers
112	Börje Salming		Toronto Maple Leafs
113	Göran Lindblom		Skellefteå
114	Tommy Samuelsson		Färjestad
115	Thomas Eriksson		Djurgården
116	Ulf Isaksson		AIK
117	Lars Molin		Modo
118	Göte Wälitalo		Björklöven
119	Peter Lindmark		Färjestad
120	Patrik Sundström		Vancouver Canucks
121	Mats Thelin		Boston Bruins
122	Bo Ericson		Södertälje
123	Anders Eldebrink		Kloten
124	Thomas Rundqvist		Feldkirch
125	Håkan Södergren		Djurgården
126	Thom Eklund		Södertälje
127	Pelle Eklund		Philadelphia Flyers
128	Thomas Steen		Winnipeg Jets
129	Michael Hjälm		Modo
130	Bengt-Åke Gustafsson		Feldkirch
131	Tommy Mörth		Djurgården
132	Peter Andersson		Björklöven
133	Peter Sundström		Washington Capitals
134	Håkan Loob		Färjestad
135	Åke Liljebjörn		AIK
136	Tommy Albelin		New Jersey Devils
137	Jonas Bergqvist		Leksand
138	Mats Kihlström		Södertälje
139	Lars-Gunnar Pettersson		Luleå
140	Matti Pauna		Björklöven
141	Anders Carlsson		Leksand
142	Mikael Andersson		Västra Frölunda
143	Lars Karlsson		Björklöven
144	Tomas Sandström		Malmö
145	Kent Nilsson		Kloten
146	Rolf Ridderwall		AIK
147	Peter Åslin		HV71
148	Magnus Svensson		Leksand
149	Mikael Johansson		Djurgården
150	Patrik Erickson		Djurgården
151	Fredrik Stillman		HV71
152	Anders Huss		Brynäs
153	Kenneth Kennholt		Djurgården
154	Johan Garpenlöv		San Jose Sharks
155	Charles Berglund		Djurgården
156	Jörgen Jönsson		Färjestad
157	Michael Nylander		New York Rangers
158	Tommy Salo		Modo
159	Mats Sundin		Toronto Maple Leafs
160	Daniel Alfredsson		Ottawa Senators
161	Ronnie Sundin		Frölunda
162	Henrik Zetterberg		Detroit Red Wings
163	Kenny Jönsson		Rögle
164	Stefan Liv		HV71
165	Peter Forsberg		Modo
166	Joel Lundqvist		Frölunda

=== Women ===
As of 26 March 2023

No	Player	Year	Club(s)
1	Annica Åhlén		Brynäs
2	Lotta Almblad		Mälarhöjden/Bredäng
3	Gunilla Andersson		Mälarhöjden/Bredäng
4	Erika Holst		Segeltorp
5	Ann-Louise Edstrand		Segeltorp

== See also ==
- List of athletes awarded Stora grabbars och tjejers märke
- List of bandy players awarded Stora Grabbars och Tjejers Märke
- List of footballers awarded Stora Grabbars och Tjejers Märke
- List of skiers awarded Stora grabbars och tjejers märke
