= Alpine skiing at the 1952 Winter Olympics – Women's giant slalom =

Women's giant slalom at the VI Olympic Winter Games
- Alpine skiing
- Venue: Norefjell Ski Resort, Krødsherad, Norway
- Date: 14 February 1952
- Competitors: 45 from 15 nations
- Winning time: 2:06.8

Medalists
1st place, gold medalist(s)		Andrea Mead Lawrence	United States
2nd place, silver medalist(s)		Dagmar Rom	Austria
3rd place, bronze medalist(s)		Annemarie Buchner	Germany

The women's alpine skiing giant slalom event was part of the alpine skiing at the 1952 Winter Olympics programme. It was the first appearance of the event at the Olympics. The competition was held on Thursday, 14 February 1952 at Norefjell ski area and started at 1 p.m. Forty-five alpine skiers from 15 nations competed.

== Results ==
Thursday, 14 February 1952

Rank	Bib #	Competitor	Time	Difference
1st place, gold medalist(s)	12	Andrea Mead Lawrence (USA)	2:06.8	—
2nd place, silver medalist(s)	11	Dagmar Rom (AUT)	2:09.0	+2.2
3rd place, bronze medalist(s)	6	Annemarie Buchner (GER)	2:10.0	+3.2
4	18	Trude Klecker (AUT)	2:11.4	+4.6
5	28	Katy Rodolph (USA)	2:11.7	+4.9
6	7	Borghild Niskin (NOR)	2:11.9	+5.1
7	2	Celina Seghi (ITA)	2:12.5	+5.7
8	15	Ossi Reichert (GER)	2:13.2	+6.4
9	1	Rhoda Wurtele-Eaves (CAN)	2:14.0	+7.2
10	20	Marianne Seltsam (GER)	2:14.1	+7.3
11	13	Jacqueline Martel (FRA)	2:14.3	+7.5
11	5	Trude Jochum-Beiser (AUT)	2:14.3	+7.5
13	11	Andrée Bermond (FRA)	2:15.2	+8.4
14	17	Evi Lanig (GER)	2:15.6	+8.8
15	29	Imogene Opton (USA)	2:15.8	+9.0
16	6	Ida Schöpfer (SUI)	2:16.6	+9.8
17	12	Erika Mahringer (AUT)	2:16.8	+10.0
18	30	Margit Hvammen (NOR)	2:17.7	+10.9
19	34	Marysette Agnel (FRA)	2:18.0	+11.2
20	19	Giuliana Minuzzo (ITA)	2:18.2	+11.4
21	3	Sarah Thomasson (SWE)	2:18.4	+11.6
22	10	Jannette Burr (USA)	2:19.2	+12.4
23	33	Rosemarie Schutz (CAN)	2:19.7	+12.9
24	35	Hilary Laing (GBR)	2:20.7	+13.9
25	31	Idly Walpoth (SUI)	2:20.8	+14.0
26	26	Kerstin Ahlqvist (SWE)	2:21.4	+14.6
27	40	Lucille Wheeler (CAN)	2:22.2	+15.4
28	27	Sheena Mackintosh (GBR)	2:22.5	+15.7
29	32	Silvia Glatthard (SUI)	2:23.1	+16.3
30	23	Joanne Hewson (CAN)	2:23.9	+17.1
31	37	Ana María Dellai (ARG)	2:29.7	+22.9
32	41	Ingrid Englund (SWE)	2:29.9	+23.1
33	39	Dagny Jørgensen (NOR)	2:31.1	+24.3
34	45	Teresa Kodelska (POL)	2:32.6	+25.8
35	22	Tull Gasmann (NOR)	2:34.3	+27.5
36	43	Fiona Campbell (GBR)	2:39.8	+33.0
37	42	Ildikó Szendrődi (HUN)	2:41.7	+34.9
38	44	Vora Mackintosh (GBR)	2:57.1	+50.3
39	47	Annette Johnson (NZL)	2:57.7	+50.9
40	46	Margriet Prajoux-Bouma (NED)	3:31.0	+1:24.2
—	14	Barbara Grocholska (POL)	DSQ	
—	16	Margareta Jacobsson (SWE)	DSQ	
—	21	Madeleine Berthod (SUI)	DSQ	
—	25	Maria Grazia Marchelli (ITA)	DSQ	
—	36	Maria Kowalska (POL)	DSQ	
