= Rolf Pettersson (ice hockey) =

Swedish ice hockey player

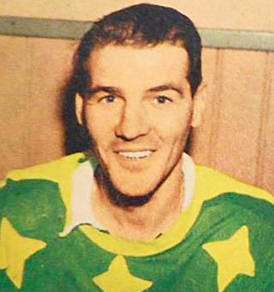
- Pettersson with Hammarby IF in 1960.
- Born: Rolf Harry Pettersson; 27 September 1926; Stockholm, Sweden
- Died: 9 November 2010 (aged 84); Stockholm, Sweden
Ice hockey career
- Position: Forward
- Played for: Hammarby IF
- National team: Sweden
- Playing career: 1946–1961
Medal record
Representing Sweden
World Championships
Silver medal – second place	Prague 1947	Team
Gold medal – first place	Zürich/Basel 1953	Team
Bronze medal – third place	Stockholm 1954	Team
Bandy career
- Playing position: Midfielder
Senior career*
Years	Team	Apps^{†}	(Gls)^{†}
1950–1962	Hammarby IF		
National team
1958–1959	Sweden	2	(0)
- * Senior club appearances and goals counted for the domestic league only. † Appearances (Goals).
Association football career
- Position: Forward
Senior career*
Years	Team	Apps	(Gls)
1949–1950	Hammarby IF	3	(0)
- * Club domestic league appearances and goals

Rolf "Mackan" Pettersson (27 September 1926 – 9 November 2010) was a Swedish ice hockey and bandy player, who represented Hammarby IF in both sports. He competed in six Ice Hockey World Championships, winning Sweden's first gold medal in 1953.

== Athletic career ==
=== Ice hockey ===
Born and raised in Stockholm, Pettersson started to play ice hockey with local club Karlbergs BK where he made his debut in Division 1, the domestic top league. In 1946, he moved to Hammarby IF. Playing as a forward, he got known as a good skater and sniper, initially forming a line with Holger Nurmela and Östen Johansson.

He won the Swedish championship with Hammarby IF in 1951. In total, he played 207 games for the club and scored 115 goals, before leaving in 1961 after 15 seasons. After leaving Hammarby IF, he finished his ice hockey career with Tranebergs SK, playing one season in the lower divisions.

Pettersson made 95 international appearances for the Swedish national team, scoring 22 goals, being part of their roster in six different World Championship tournaments. Most notably, he won Sweden's first gold medal in 1953, as well as winning the silver medal in 1947 and bronze medal in 1954. He also competed in the 1948 Winter Olympics in Garmisch-Partenkirchen, where his country finished in 4th place.

He is a recipient of the honorary award Stora Grabbars Märke, awarded by the Swedish Ice Hockey Association.

=== Bandy ===
Starting his bandy career with local clubs IF Ulvarna, Stockholms IF and Minnebergs IK, Pettersson moved to Hammarby IF in 1950. The club reached its first Swedish Championship final in 1957, but lost 1–2 to Örebro SK at Stockholms stadion, in which Pettersson assisted Leif Fredblad who scored the consolation goal for his side. He played ten seasons with Hammarby IF in Allsvenskan, the domestic top tier, and won two caps for the Swedish national team.

=== Football ===
In 1949–50, Pettersson also briefly played football with Hammarby IF, making three appearances in Division 3, Sweden's third tier.
