= Margriet Prajoux-Bouma =

Dutch alpine skier

Personal information
- Nationality: Dutch
- Born: 19 June 1912 Franeker? (Note: The birth place Prajoux-Bouma provided registering for the Olympics was "Hauswernich, Germany", while for the United States customs on her 1938 trip she wrote "Virnick, Holland". Neither match known locations. She told reporters in Oslo in 1952 that she originated from Franeker.)
- Died: 17 December 2005 (aged 93)

Sport
- Sport: Alpine skiing

Margriet "Grietje" Prajoux-Bouma (also Marguerite; 19 June 1912 – 17 December 2005) was a Dutch alpine skier living in France. She competed for the Netherlands in the women's giant slalom at the 1952 Winter Olympics.

Allegedly hailing from Franeker, she moved to France, where between 1936 (in Megève) and 1951 she participated in French skiing competitions. In May 1938, as a Dutch citizen and aged 25, she took a trip to the United States, accompanied by the 51-year-old hotel manager (Eugène Vincent) Emile Prajoux. The couple married 12 April 1940 in Paris. (Note: The Bouma and Prajoux families have a shared gravesite at the Passy Cemetery in Paris that appears to predate their marriage.) Emile Prajoux died before 1951 and Bouma became a Dutch citizenship again, though she remained in Paris. She won the 1951 and 1952 Dutch combined skiing competition, the latter apparently as sole competitor, and was selected as the female Dutch skiing participant in the 1952 Winter Olympics. At nearly 40 years old she has been the oldest Dutch Winter Olympics competitor.

On February 14, 1952, she competed in the women's giant slalom. She finished 40th and last in 3:31 minutes, 33 seconds behind the next competitor and 84 seconds behind the winner. She then withdrew from participation in the slalom and downhill races. Partially because of her poor results, the Dutch Olympic committee decided to tighten selection criteria for participation.
