= Karl-Gustaf Svensson =

Swedish sports shooter

Personal information
- Born: 3 October 1879 Stockholm, Sweden
- Died: 9 February 1962 (aged 82) Stockholm, Sweden

Sport
- Sport: Sports shooting

Karl-Gustaf Svensson (3 October 1879 – 9 February 1962) was a Swedish sports shooter. He competed in the running deer, double shot event at the 1924 Summer Olympics.
