= Hans Öberg =

Swedish ice hockey and bandy player

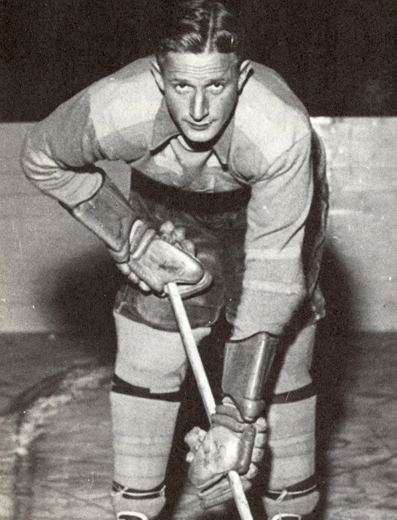
- Hans Öberg

Personal information
- Born: 21 November 1926 Gävle, Sweden
- Died: 9 March 2009 (aged 82) Gävle, Sweden

Sport
- Sport: Ice hockey
- Club: Gävle Godtemplares IK
Medal record
Representing Sweden
Olympic Games
Bronze medal – third place	1952 Oslo	Team
World Championships
Gold medal – first place	Zürich/Basel 1953	Team
Bronze medal – third place	Stockholm 1954	Team
Gold medal – first place	Moscow 1957	Team
Bronze medal – third place	Oslo 1958	Team

Hans Andreas "Stöveln" Öberg (21 November 1926 – 9 March 2009) was a Swedish ice hockey and bandy player. He represented his country at the 1952 Winter Olympics in Oslo, winning the bronze medal in the team competition. He also played on the Swedish team that finished fourth in the competition four years later at the 1956 Cortina d'Ampezzo Olympics. He was the brother of future Olympic silver medallist Carl-Göran Öberg. He played club hockey for Gävle Godtemplares IK, with whom he won the Guldpucken award in 1957, a year after his 1952 international teammate Åke Lassas. Öberg also played football and bandy, and won the Swedish bandy championship in 1959 with Skutskärs IF.
