= John Wickström (speed skater) =

Swedish speed skater

Personal information
- Nationality: Swedish
- Born: 23 April 1927; Gävle, Sweden
- Died: 10 December 1987 (aged 60); Norrköping, Sweden

Sport
- Sport: Speed skating

John Wickström (23 April 1927 – 10 December 1987) was a Swedish speed skater. He competed in two events at the 1952 Winter Olympics.
