= John Fredriksson =

Swedish alpine skier (1923–2012)

Personal information
- Nationality: Swedish
- Born: 30 August 1923; Åre, Sweden
- Died: 29 May 2012 (aged 88); Östersund, Sweden

Sport
- Sport: Alpine skiing

John Fredriksson (30 August 1923 – 29 May 2012) was a Swedish alpine skier. He competed in three events at the 1952 Winter Olympics.
