= Carl-Erik Asplund =

Swedish speed skater (1923–2024)

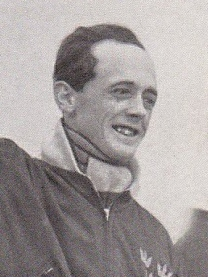

Personal information
- Born: 14 September 1923 Föllinge, Sweden
- Died: 8 January 2024 (aged 100)

Sport
- Sport: Speed skating
- Club: IF Castor, Östersund

Achievements and titles
- Personal best(s): 500 m – 45.1 (1954); 1500 m – 2:20.9 (1951); 5000 m – 8:21.8 (1951); 10000 m – 17:16.6 (1952)
Medal record
Representing Sweden
Olympic Games
Bronze medal – third place	1952 Oslo	10000 m

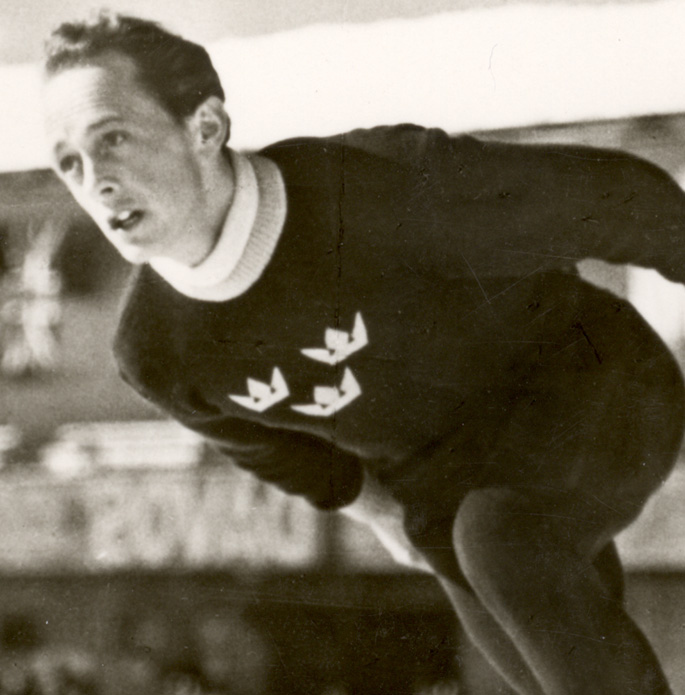

Carl-Erik Asplund (14 September 1923 – 8 January 2024) was a Swedish speed skater who won a bronze medal in the 10000 m event at the 1952 Olympics. In the 1500 metres event he finished fourth and in the 5000 metres competition he finished sixth.

Asplund specialised in long distances and won medals in the 5000 and 10000 m at European and world championships. He never finished within the podium overall; in 1951 he was fourth at the European Championships and sixth at the world championships. Nationally he won nine Swedish titles: 1500 m (1951–1953), 3000 m (1951–1952), 5000 m (1951–1952) and 10,000 m (1951, 1953). In 1953, he won the discontinued Nordic championship, having finished second in 1951.

Asplund turned 100 on 14 September 2023, and died on 8 January 2024.
