= Lars Svensson (ice hockey) =

Swedish ice hockey player (1926–1999)

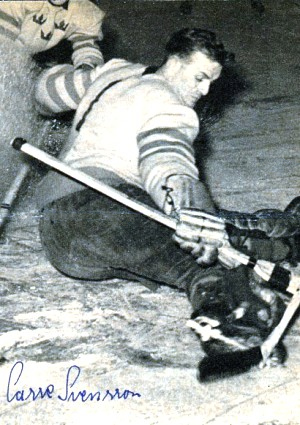
- Born: June 30, 1926 Stockholm, Sweden
- Died: June 25, 1999 (aged 72) Stockholm, Sweden
- Position: Goaltender
- Caught: Left
- National team: Sweden
- Playing career: 1944–1960
Medal record
Men's Ice hockey
Representing Sweden
Olympic Games
Bronze medal – third place	1952 Oslo	Team
World Championships
Silver medal – second place	1951 Paris	Team

Lars Åke Svensson (30 June 1926 – 25 June 1999) was a Swedish ice hockey goaltender. He competed at the 1952 and 1956 Winter Olympics and placed third and fourth, respectively.

In the early 1950s, Svensson was the backup goaltender for Thord Flodqvist. Between 1949 and 1956 he played 52 international matches and won European titles in 1951 and 1952, finishing second at the 1951 world and 1956 European championships, and third at Europeans in 1950 and 1955. Nationally, Svensson played with UoIF Matteuspojkarna in 1947–52, with AIK in 1952–55, and with Hammarby IF in 1955–56. He was awarded the Stora Grabbars Märke #43 in ice hockey, a Swedish sports honorary award created in 1928 by Bo Ekelund.
