= Gösta Johansson =

Swedish ice hockey player (1929–1997)

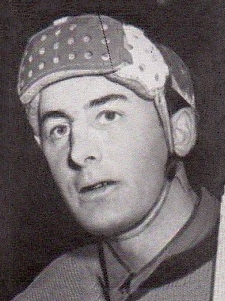
- Gösta Johansson in the 1950s
- Born: 2 March 1929 Stockholm, Sweden
- Died: 10 April 1997 (aged 68) Stockholm, Sweden
- Played for: IK Göta; Djurgårdens IF; Västerås IK
- Playing career: 1945–1963
Medal record
Representing Sweden
Olympic Games
Bronze medal – third place	1952 Oslo	Team
World Championships
Silver medal – second place	1951 Paris	Team
Gold medal – first place	1953 Zurich	Team
Bronze medal – third place	1954 Stockholm	Team

Gösta Rudolf Torsten "Lill-Lulle" Johansson (2 March 1929 – 10 April 1997) was a Swedish ice hockey player. Johansson played for IK Göta, Djurgårdens IF, KTSV Preussen Krefeld, Västerås IK, and Hammarby IF.

== Biography ==
Johansson was born in Stockholm to ice hockey player Gustaf Johansson.

In 1953 Johansson became world champion with the Swedish team. He was named one of the best players of 1949–1955 among Sven Tumba, Roland Stoltz and Lasse Björn. He was 32nd recipient of the Stor Grabb, an honorary award within Swedish sports. In 1952 Johansson finished third with the Swedish team in the Winter Olympics ice hockey tournament. He also won silver in 1951 and bronze in 1954 in the World Ice Hockey Championships. As a player of Djurgårdens IF, Johansson was Swedish champion a total of seven times.

Johansson was the first Swedish ice hockey player to play professionally. He won the German championship as a player of Krefeld in former Federal Republic of Germany. Besides working as a businessman, Johansson was a successful trainer in Sweden, Switzerland and Italy. He coached the team Bolzano to 3 times championship victory.

He became the second highest ranked Swedish ice hockey professional in Europe. He played in Zurich-Switzerland, and Krefeld in Germany during the 1950–1951 season.

After finishing his active career, Johansson worked as an ice hockey coach. He was also a businessman in Sweden, Switzerland and Italy. Johansson won the Italian championship three times.

== Personal life ==
In 1955 he married the German skater Gundi Busch. She was Germany's first World championship in ice skating, which she won in 1954. Later they moved to Stockholm with their son Peter Lulle Johansson. In Stockholm, Gundi worked as ice skating trainer for many years before she died in Chronic obstructive pulmonary disease 2014.

Johansson died from liver cancer at home in Stockholm in 1997.
