= Wilhelm Petersén (ice hockey) =

Swedish ice hockey and bandy player (1906–1988)

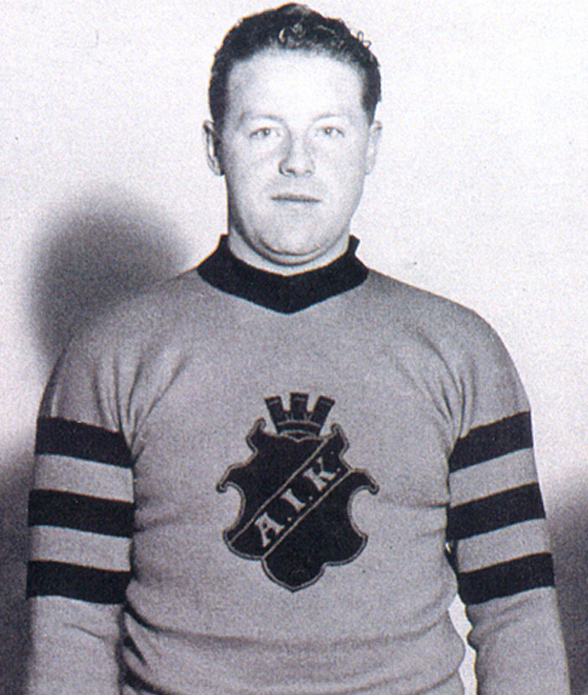

Personal information
- Born: 2 October 1906 Stockholm, Sweden
- Died: 11 December 1988 (aged 82) Nacka, Stockholm, Sweden

Sport
- Sport: Ice hockey
- Club: AIK (1924–26, 1929–37); Södertälje SK (1926–29)
- Retired: 1937
Medal record
Representing Sweden
Olympic Games
Silver medal – second place	1928 St. Moritz	Team
European Championships
Gold medal – first place	1932 Berlin	Team

Wilhelm Knut "Mulle" Petersén (2 October 1906 – 11 December 1988) was a Swedish ice hockey and bandy player. He competed in the 1928 and 1936 Winter Olympics and finished in second and fifth place, respectively. Between 1928 and 1936 he played 20 international matches and won a European title in 1932.

Petersén was one three people who competed internationally in association football, bandy and ice hockey, and won Swedish titles in all these sports. As an ice hockey player, he won national titles with AIK in 1934 and 1935, and was the best Swedish scorer in 1928, 1932, 1933 and 1937. In association football, he was a 1932 Swedish champion with AIK and twice played internationally in 1930. In bandy, Petersén won a Swedish title in 1931 and twice played internationally in 1931–32.

After retiring from competitions, Petersén ran his Mulle Coffee-Roastery in Duvbo, Stockholm.
