= Erik Johansson (ice hockey) =

Swedish ice hockey player (1927–1992)

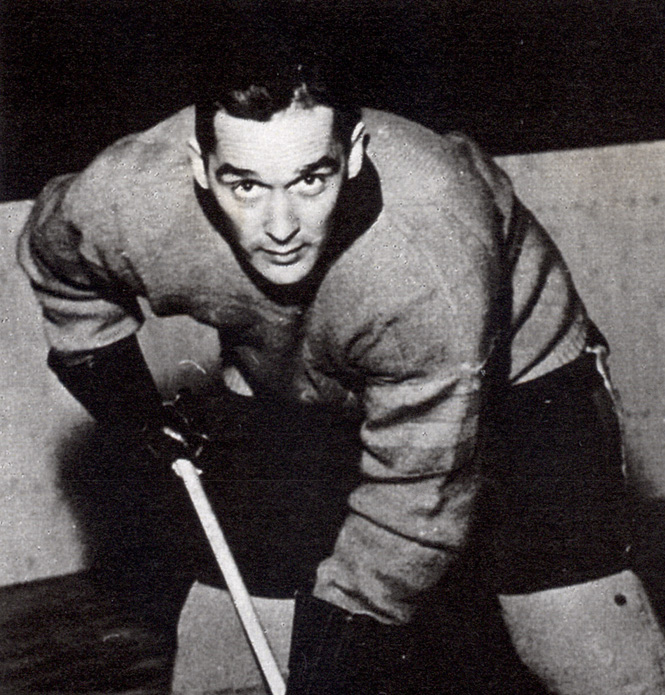

Personal information
- Born: 29 September 1927 Södertälje, Sweden
- Died: 16 December 1992 (aged 65) Södertälje, Sweden

Sport
- Sport: Ice hockey
- Club: Södertälje SK (1944–60)
Medal record
Representing Sweden
Olympic Games
Bronze medal – third place	1952 Oslo	Team
World Championships
Silver medal – second place	1947 Prague	Team
Silver medal – second place	1951 Paris	Team
Gold medal – first place	1953 Zürich/Basel	Team
Bronze medal – third place	1954 Stockholm	Team

Erik Gunnar "Epa" Johansson (29 September 1927 – 16 December 1992) was a Swedish ice hockey player. Between 1947 and 1959 he played 142 international matches and scored 73 goals. He won an Olympic bronze in 1952 and the world title in 1953, finishing second in 1947 and 1951 and third in 1954. He was also a Swedish champion with Södertälje SK in 1953 and 1956. After retiring from competitions he worked as an ice hockey coach with BK Remo.
