= Sven Thunman =

Swedish ice hockey player

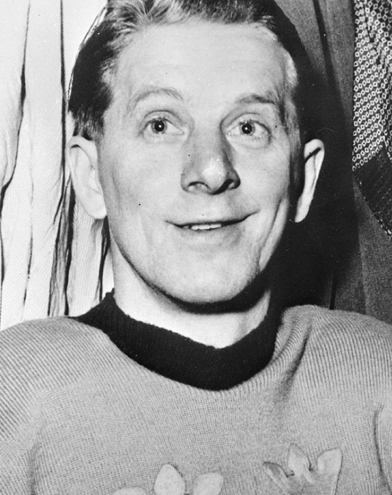

Personal information
- Born: 20 April 1920 Södertälje, Sweden
- Died: 8 July 2004 (aged 84) Södertälje, Sweden

Sport
- Sport: Ice hockey
- Club: Södertälje SK (1941–59)
Medal record
Representing Sweden
Olympic Games
Bronze medal – third place	1952 Oslo	Team
World Championships
Silver medal – second place	Paris 1951	Team
Gold medal – first place	Zürich/Basel 1953	Team
Bronze medal – third place	Stockholm 1954	Team

Sven Ragnar Thunman (20 April 1920 – 8 July 2004) was a Swedish ice hockey defenseman. Between 1946 and 1957 he capped 114 times with the Swedish national team and scored 14 goals. During that time he won a gold, a silver and a bronze medal at the 1952 Winter Olympics, finishing fourth in 1948.

Thunman won three Swedish titles with Södertälje, in 1944, 1953 and 1956. After retiring from competitions he first worked as a coach with Väsby IK in 1959–64. He then became an ice hockey and football referee in the 1960s and 1970s, and was a korpfotball referee until his death in 2004.
