= Göte Blomqvist =

Swedish ice hockey player

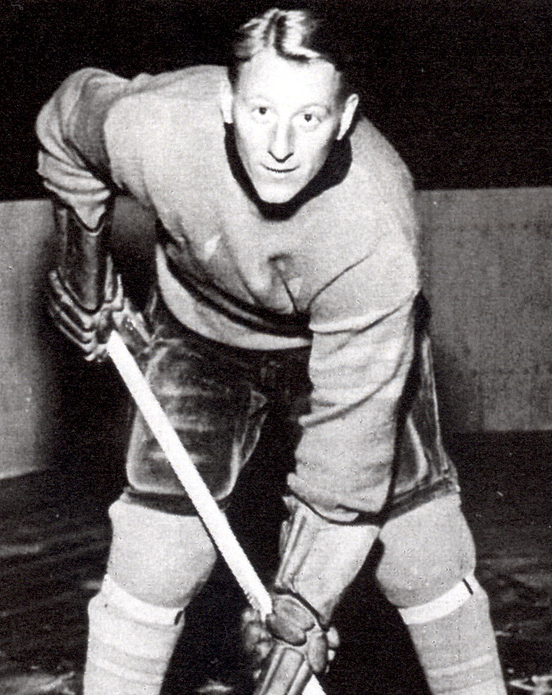
- Göte Blomqvist in the 1950's

Personal information
- Born: 11 January 1928 Södertälje, Sweden
- Died: 28 February 2003 (aged 75) Södertälje, Sweden

Sport
- Sport: Ice hockey
- Club: Södertälje SK (1946–62)
Medal record
Representing Sweden
Olympic Games
Bronze medal – third place	1952 Oslo	Team
World Championships
Gold medal – first place	1953 Zürich/Basel	Team
Bronze medal – third place	1954 Stockholm	Team

Göte Paulus "Vicke Hallon" Blomqvist (11 January 1928 – 28 February 2003) was a Swedish ice hockey player. Between 1947 and 1957 he capped 108 international matches and scored 68 goals. He won a world title in 1953 and bronze medals at the 1952 Winter Olympics and 1954 World Championships. He was also a Swedish champion with Södertälje SK in 1953 and 1956 and the best Swedish scorer in 1951–53. He holds the record of most goals scored during one match (8) at the Swedish Championships.

After retiring from competition he worked as an ice hockey coach with Morgårdshammars IF, BK Remo, Enhörna IF and Södertälje SK.
