= Göte Almqvist =

Swedish ice hockey player

Personal information
- Born: 25 June 1921 Skellefteå, Sweden
- Died: 21 December 1994 (aged 74) Skellefteå, Sweden

Sport
- Sport: Ice hockey
Medal record
Representing Sweden
World Championships
Gold medal – first place	Zürich/Basel 1953	Team
Bronze medal – third place	Stockholm 1954	Team
Olympic Games
Bronze medal – third place	1952 Oslo	Team

Göte Augustin Almqvist (25 June 1921 – 21 December 1994) was a Swedish ice hockey player who represented his country at the 1952 Winter Olympics in Oslo, winning the bronze medal in the team competition. He played his club hockey for Skellefteå AIK.
