= Sarah Thomasson =

Swedish alpine skier (1925–1996)

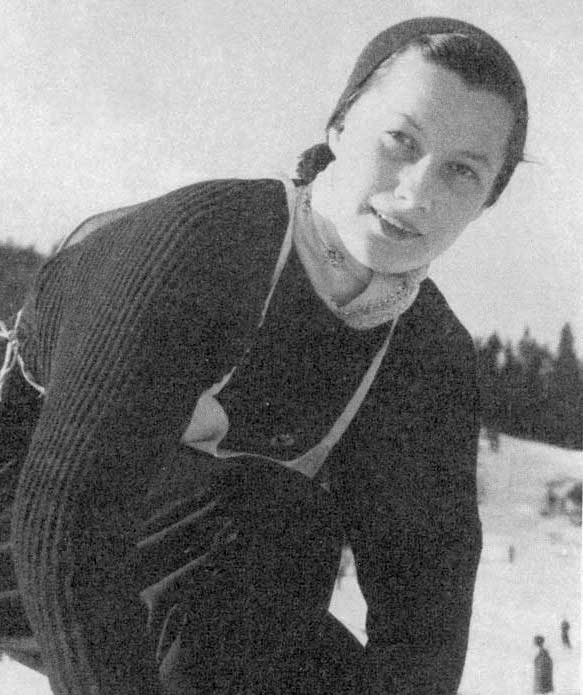
- Sarah Thomasson

Personal information
- Born: 20 July 1925 Åre, Jämtland, Sweden
- Died: 24 March 1996 (aged 70) Östersund, Sweden

Sport
- Sport: Alpine skiing
- Club: Åre SLK
Medal record
Representing Sweden
World Championships
Bronze medal – third place	1954 Åre	Slalom

Sarah Margareta Thomasson (later Voss; 20 July 1925 – 24 March 1996) was a Swedish-Southern Saami alpine skier who won a bronze medal in the slalom at the 1954 World Championships. She competed in the slalom, giant slalom and downhill at the 1952 Winter Olympics with the best result of 12th place in the slalom.
