= Ingrid Englund =

Swedish alpine skier (1926–1999)

Personal information
- Nationality: Swedish
- Born: 24 March 1926; Sundsvall, Sweden
- Died: 13 October 1999 (aged 73); Sundsvall, Sweden

Sport
- Sport: Alpine skiing

Ingrid Englund (24 March 1926 – 13 October 1999) was a Swedish alpine skier. She competed at the 1952 Winter Olympics and the 1956 Winter Olympics.
