= Kerstin Ahlqvist =

Swedish alpine skier (1927–2000)

Personal information
- Born: 11 July 1927; Frösön, Sweden
- Died: 2 October 2000 (aged 73); Gnesta, Sweden
- Occupation: Alpine skier

Skiing career
- Club: Djurgårdens IF

Kerstin Lucia Ahlqvist (married Winnberg) (11 July 1927 – 2 October 2000) was a Swedish alpine skier. She competed in two events at the 1952 Winter Olympics.

Ahlqvist represented Djurgårdens IF.
