= Margareta Jacobsson =

Swedish alpine skier (1929–2021)

Personal information
- Nationality: Swedish
- Born: 20 July 1929; Järvsö, Sweden
- Died: 27 January 2021 (aged 91); Kungsängen, Sweden

Sport
- Sport: Alpine skiing

Margareta Jacobsson (20 July 1929 – 27 January 2021) was a Swedish alpine skier. She competed in three events at the 1952 Winter Olympics.

Jacobsson was born in Järvsö, represented Sollefteå GIF, and died in Kungsängen.
