= Lars Pettersson (ice hockey) =

Swedish ice hockey and bandy player

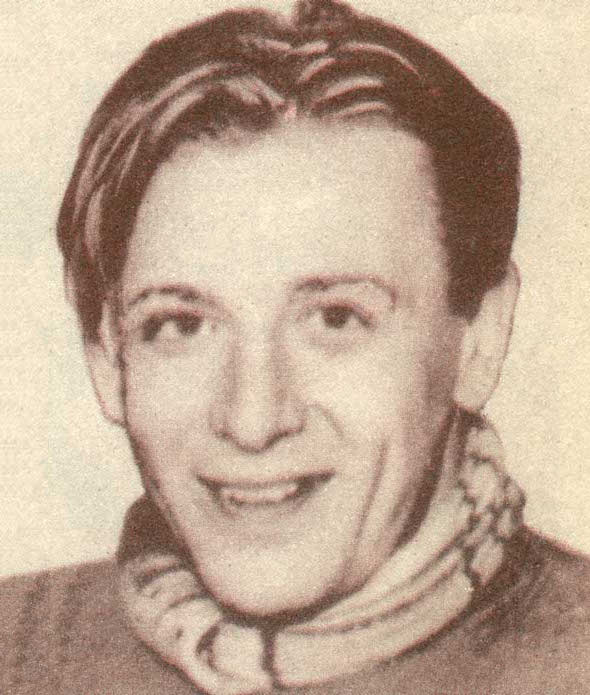

Personal information
- Born: 19 March 1925 Västerås, Sweden
- Died: 8 May 1971 (aged 46) Västerås, Sweden

Sport
- Sport: Ice hockey
- Club: Västerås SK (1945–50, 52–54); AIK IF (1950–52)
Medal record
Representing Sweden
Men's Ice hockey
Olympic Games
Bronze medal – third place	1952 Oslo	Team
World Championships
Silver medal – second place	1951 Paris	Team

Lars Erik Pettersson (19 March 1925 – 8 May 1971) was a Swedish ice hockey and bandy player. He represented his country at the 1952 Winter Olympics. He won a bronze medal in the team competition and scored six goals.
