= Thord Flodqvist =

Swedish ice hockey player

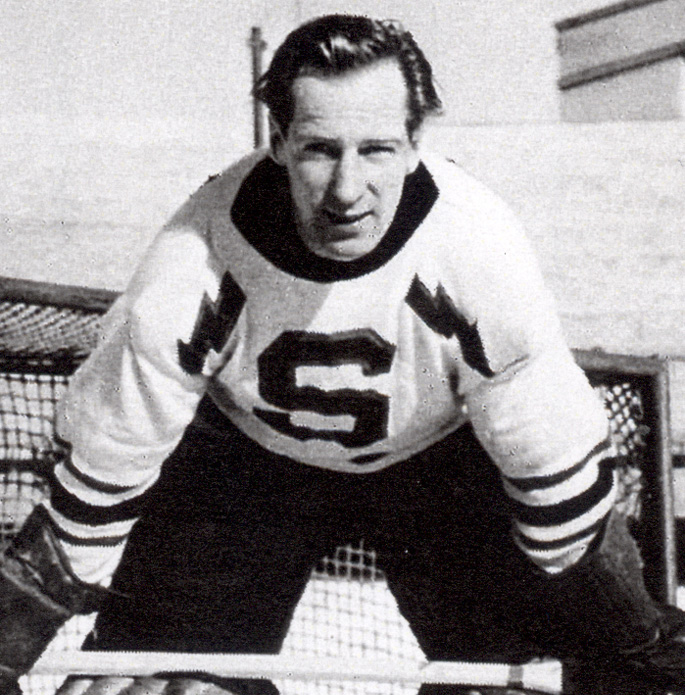
- Thord Flodqvist with Södertälje SK in the 1950's

Personal information
- Born: 5 August 1926 Södertälje, Sweden
- Died: 15 March 1988 (aged 61) Södertälje, Sweden

Sport
- Sport: Ice hockey
- Club: Södertälje SK (1944–60); AIK IF (1950–52)
Medal record
Representing Sweden
Olympic Games
Bronze medal – third place	1952 Oslo	Team
World Championships
Gold medal – first place	Zürich/Basel 1953	Team
Bronze medal – third place	Stockholm 1954	Team
Gold medal – first place	Moscow 1957	Team
Bronze medal – third place	Oslo 1958	Team

Thord Rubert "Flodan" Flodqvist (5 August 1926 – 15 March 1988) was a Swedish ice hockey goaltender who won a bronze medal at the 1952 Winter Olympics. He played 82 international matches with the Swedish national team between 1946 and 1958, and was the primary goaltender in 1952–57. He won the world title in 1953 and 1957, finishing third in 1954 and 1958. Nationally he became Swedish champion in 1953 and 1956 with Södertälje SK.

Flodqvist was instrumental in winning the 1957 world title in Moscow. In a final-round match against the Soviet Union, Sweden needed a tie to win the tournament. In the final minutes, with the score 4-4, the Soviets attacked heavily, and Flodqvist stopped one of the shots by his cheek. Goaltenders did not wear helmets then, and Flodqvist had a high fever throughout the game. He fell unconscious on the ice, yet continued the match. After retiring from competitions he worked as a coach with Södertälje SK junior teams.
