= Åke Lassas =

Swedish ice hockey player

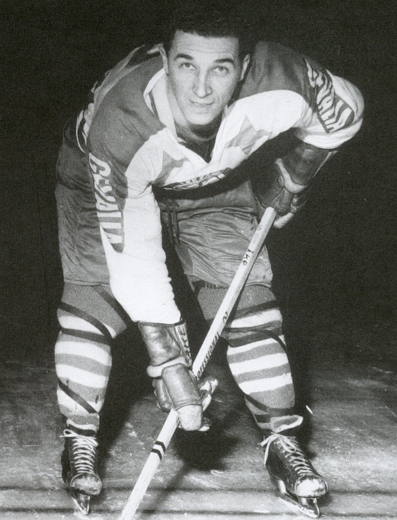
- Åke Lassas in the 1950s

Personal information
- Born: 21 August 1924 Leksand, Sweden
- Died: 16 April 2009 (aged 84) Leksand, Sweden

Sport
- Sport: Ice hockey
- Club: Leksands IF (1948–63)
Medal record
Representing Sweden
Olympic Games
Bronze medal – third place	1952 Oslo	Team
World Championships
Silver medal – second place	Paris 1951	Team
Bronze medal – third place	Stockholm 1954	Team

Åke Erik Lassas (21 August 1924 – 16 April 2009) was a Swedish ice hockey player. He competed at the 1952 and 1956 Winter Olympics and finished in third and fourth place, respectively. He played club hockey for Leksands IF and won the inaugural Guldpucken award in 1956 given to the best player in the Swedish league. He also competed in bandy and association football at the national level.
