= 1953 Ice Hockey World Championships =

1953 edition of the IIHF World Ice Hockey Championship

Tournament details
- Host country: Switzerland
- Dates: 7–15 March
- Teams: 4

Final positions
- Champions: Sweden (1st title)
- Runners-up: West Germany
- Third place: Switzerland
- Fourth place: Italy

Tournament statistics
- Games played: 6
- Goals scored: 64 (10.67 per game)
- Attendance: 53,000 (8,833 per game)

The 1953 Ice Hockey World Championships were the 20th World Championships and the 31st European Championships in ice hockey. The tournament took place between March 7 and March 15, 1953, in Basel and Zürich, Switzerland. Sweden won their first World Championship title and their seventh European Championship title.

This was the first world championship tournament with only European teams; on January 12, 1953, Canadian Amateur Hockey Association president W. B. George stated Canada would not be sending a team to the 1953 World Championships. He told the press: "Every year we spend C$10,000 to send a Canadian hockey team to Europe to play 40 exhibition games. All these games are played to packed houses that only enrich European hockey coffers. In return we are subjected to constant, unnecessary abuse over our Canadian style of play".

Also absent were the Soviet Union; it was hoped that the USSR would participate but they did not, but they sent observers, including coach Anatoli Tarasov, to scout the tournament. It is believed that injuries to their star players, including Vsevolod Bobrov, was the reason behind the decision.

Czechoslovakia were withdrawn from the tournament by General František Janda, the Chairman of the State Committee for the Physical Education and Sport, who ordered the team home when it became obvious their President, Klement Gottwald, was going to die from pneumonia he contracted at Stalin's funeral. Gottwald died the next day, March 14, 1953; subsequently, the team was disqualified, with their results being deleted from the records and their remaining games cancelled.

== World Championships Group A (Switzerland) ==
Date	Matches A World Championships 1953	Result	Period.
7 March	Czechoslovakia vs. West Germany	11–2 (annulled)	4–1, 5–0, 2–1
7 March	Switzerland vs. Sweden	2–9	1–2, 1–5, 0–2
8 March	Switzerland vs. Czechoslovakia	4–9 (annulled)	0–4, 1–2, 3–3
8 March	Sweden vs. West Germany	8–6	4–1, 3–3, 1–2
10 March	Sweden vs. Czechoslovakia	5–3 (annulled)	5–1, 0–1, 0–1
10 March	West Germany vs. Switzerland	2–3	0–1, 2–1, 0–1
12 March	Sweden vs. Switzerland	9–1	5–1, 1–0, 3–0
12 March	West Germany vs. Czechoslovakia	4–9 (annulled)	2–4, 1–2, 1–3
13 March	Czechoslovakia vs. Switzerland	Cancelled	
13 March	West Germany vs. Sweden	2–12	0–2, 1–5, 1–5
15 March	Czechoslovakia vs. Sweden	Cancelled	
15 March	Switzerland vs. West Germany	3–7	2–4, 0–1, 1–2

=== Table ===
Pos	Team	Pld	W	D	L	GF	GA	GD	Pts
1	Sweden	4	4	0	0	38	11	+27	8
2	West Germany	4	1	0	3	17	26	−9	2
3	Switzerland	4	1	0	3	9	27	−18	2
NC	Czechoslovakia	0	0	0	0	0	0	0	0

== World Championships Group B (Switzerland) ==
Also participating was a Swiss 'B' team who (if their games counted) would have finished third.

Date	Matches B World Championships 1953	Result	Period.
7 March	Italy vs. Austria	9–5	3–1, 4–3, 2–1
7 March	Switzerland B vs. Great Britain	1–3	1–0, 0–1, 0–2
8 March	Austria vs. Netherlands	5–3	2–0, 2–3, 1–0
8 March	Switzerland B vs. France	7–1	4–1, 1–0, 2–0
10 March	Great Britain vs. Netherlands	8–4	4–2, 1–2, 3–0
10 March	Switzerland B vs. Italy	1–2	1–0, 0–0, 0–2
11 March	Austria vs. France	8–1	2–1, 2–0, 4–0
11 March	Italy vs. Netherlands	7–0	4–0, 1–0, 2–0
12 March	Great Britain vs. France	8–3	3–0, 3–1, 2–2
13 March	Great Britain vs. Austria	3–0	1–0, 1–0, 1–0
13 March	Switzerland B vs. Netherlands	7–5	1–1, 5–2, 1–2
14 March	Italy vs. France	5–2	2–1, 1–0, 2–1
14 March	Switzerland B vs. Austria	8–2	2–0, 1–1, 5–1
15 March	Netherlands vs. France	8–3	4–1, 2–1, 2–1
15 March	Italy vs. Great Britain	3–2	3–0, 0–0, 0–2

=== Table ===
Pos	Team	Pld	W	D	L	GF	GA	GD	Pts
4	Italy	5	5	0	0	26	10	+16	10
5	Great Britain	5	4	0	1	24	11	+13	8
NC	Switzerland B	5	3	0	2	24	13	+11	6
6	Austria	5	2	0	3	20	24	−4	4
7	Netherlands	5	1	0	4	20	30	−10	2
8	France	5	0	0	5	10	36	−26	0
