= List of 1952 Winter Olympics medal winners =

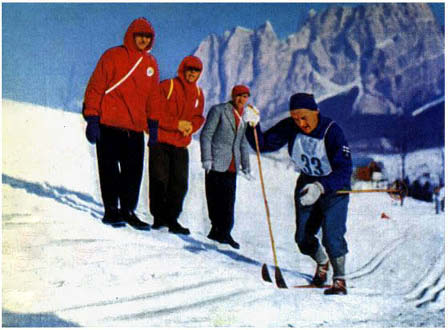
Sverre Stenersen, the 1952 bronze medallist in Nordic combined, pictured here at the 1956 Winter Olympics in Cortina d'Ampezzo, Italy where he won gold in the same event

The 1952 Winter Olympics, officially known by the International Olympic Committee as the VI Olympic Winter Games, were a multi-sport event held in Oslo, Norway, from February 14–25, 1952. A total of 694 athletes representing 30 National Olympic Committees (NOCs) participated at the Games in 22 events across 8 disciplines. Of the 30 participating NOCs, Portugal and New Zealand made their Winter Olympic Games debuts in Oslo—neither delegation secured a medal.

The Olympic programme changed only slightly from that of the 1948 St. Moritz Olympics, with the addition of women's cross-country skiing, and changes to the alpine skiing line-up where the combined was replaced by the giant slalom. Bandy was held as the sole demonstration event at the Games. Both men and women participated at these Games; aside from cross-country skiing, women also took part in alpine skiing and figure skating. The Games were officially opened by a woman for the first time; Princess Ragnhild of Norway did the honours in the absence of both her father Crown Prince Olav and grandfather King Haakon VII, away in London for the funeral of George VI of the United Kingdom who had died just days before the Games opened.

A total of 115 athletes won at least one medal at the Games. On home soil, athletes from Norway won sixteen medals, including seven golds, the most of any country at the Games. The United States (eleven medals, four golds) and Finland (nine medals, three golds) finished second and third in the medal table respectively. Athletes from 13 of the 30 participating NOCs won at least one medal; athletes from eight countries won at least one gold. Of the 13 NOCs which won medals, 10 won more than one. Germany made their return to the Olympics after being barred from both the 1948 Winter and Summer Games for their involvement in World War II. As a result of the war, Germany had been divided into two nations, the Federal Republic of Germany (FRG), and the German Democratic Republic. Only the FRG competed at these Games, where they won both the two-man and four-man bobsleigh events by taking advantage of a not-yet implemented rule by the Fédération Internationale de Bobsleigh et de Tobogganing that imposed a weight limit on bobsleigh teams.

Dick Button of the United States successfully defended the Olympic title he won in St. Moritz for men's singles figure skating, in the process becoming the first skater to be unanimously ranked first by judges in every round of an Olympic competition. Finland's Lydia Wideman won the first gold medal awarded in women's cross-country skiing, with Mirja Hietamies and Siiri Rantanen completing an all-Finnish podium in the event. Finland won three of the four golds and eight of the twelve medals on offer in the sport. Hjalmar Andersen was the most successful athlete at the Games, winning three gold medals in speed skating. In two of the three events he won, the 5000 m and 10000 m, he set new Olympic records and won by the largest margins in those events' Olympic history: 11 seconds in the 5000 m and nearly 25 seconds in the 10000 m. Mirl Buchner of Germany also won three medals at the Games, with one silver and two bronzes won in alpine skiing. A total of 18 athletes won more than one medal at the Games. However, only four of them won more than one gold medal: Andersen; Andrea Mead Lawrence of the United States; and Lorenz Nieberl and Andreas Ostler of Germany.

== Alpine skiing ==
| Event | Gold | Silver | Bronze |
|---|---|---|---|
| Men's downhill | Zeno Colò; Italy | Othmar Schneider; Austria | Christian Pravda; Austria |
| Women's downhill | Trude Jochum-Beiser; Austria | Annemarie Buchner; Germany | Giuliana Minuzzo; Italy |
| Men's giant slalom | Stein Eriksen; Norway | Christian Pravda; Austria | Toni Spiß; Austria |
| Women's giant slalom | Andrea Mead Lawrence; United States | Dagmar Rom; Austria | Annemarie Buchner; Germany |
| Men's slalom | Othmar Schneider; Austria | Stein Eriksen; Norway | Guttorm Berge; Norway |
| Women's slalom | Andrea Mead Lawrence; United States | Ossi Reichert; Germany | Annemarie Buchner; Germany |

== Bobsleigh ==
| Event | Gold | Silver | Bronze |
|---|---|---|---|
| Two-man | Germany; Germany I Andreas Ostler; Lorenz Nieberl | United States; USA I Stanley Benham; Patrick Martin | Switzerland; Switzerland I Fritz Feierabend; Stephan Waser |
| Four-man | Germany; Germany I Andreas Ostler; Friedrich Kuhn; Lorenz Nieberl; Franz Kemser | United States; USA I Stanley Benham; Patrick Martin; Howard Crossett; James Atkinson | Switzerland; Switzerland I Fritz Feierabend; Albert Madörin; André Filippini; Stephan Waser |

== Cross-country skiing ==
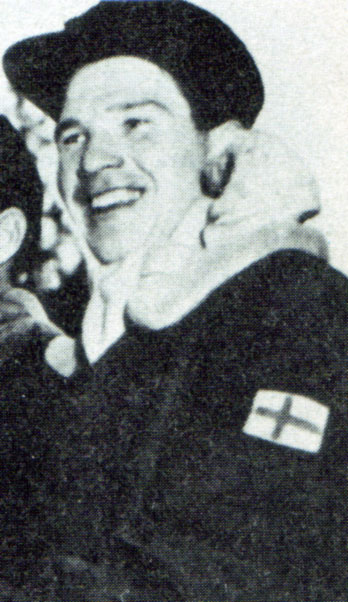
Heikki Hasu was part of Finland's gold medal-winning cross-country relay team at the 1952 Winter Olympics. Hasu also won a silver medal at the same Games in Nordic combined.

| Event | Gold | Silver | Bronze |
|---|---|---|---|
| Women's 10 km | Lydia Wideman; Finland | Mirja Hietamies; Finland | Siiri Rantanen; Finland |
| Men's 18 km | Hallgeir Brenden; Norway | Tapio Mäkelä; Finland | Paavo Lonkila; Finland |
| Men's 50 km | Veikko Hakulinen; Finland | Eero Kolehmainen; Finland | Magnar Estenstad; Norway |
| Men's 4×10 km relay | Finland; Heikki Hasu; Paavo Lonkila; Urpo Korhonen; Tapio Mäkelä | Norway; Magnar Estenstad; Mikal Kirkholt; Martin Stokken; Hallgeir Brenden | Sweden; Nils Täpp; Sigurd Andersson; Enar Josefsson; Martin Lundström |

== Figure skating ==
| Event | Gold | Silver | Bronze |
|---|---|---|---|
| Men's singles | Dick Button; United States | Helmut Seibt; Austria | James Grogan; United States |
| Ladies' singles | Jeannette Altwegg; Great Britain | Tenley Albright; United States | Jacqueline du Bief; France |
| Pairs | Germany; Ria Falk; Paul Falk | United States; Karol Kennedy; Peter Kennedy | Hungary; Marianna Nagy; László Nagy |

== Ice hockey ==
| Event | Gold | Silver | Bronze |
|---|---|---|---|
| Men's team | Canada; Eric Paterson; Ralph Hansch; John Davies; Don Gauf; Robert Meyers; Thomas Pollock; Al Purvis; Billy Gibson; David Miller; George Abel; Billy Dawe; Robert Dickson; Gordon Robertson; Louis Secco; Francis Sullivan; Robert Watt | United States; Alfred Van Allen; André Gambucci; Arnold Oss; Clifford Harrison; Donald Whiston; Gerald Kilmartin; James Sedin; John Mulhern; John Noah; Joseph Czarnota; Kenneth Yackel; Len Ceglarski; Richard Desmond; Robert Rompre; Ruben Bjorkman | Sweden; Göte Almqvist; Hans Andersson; Stig Andersson; Åke Andersson; Lasse Björn; Göte Blomqvist; Thord Flodqvist; Erik Johansson; Gösta Johansson; Rune Johansson; Sven "Tumba" Johansson; Åke Lassas; Holger Nurmela; Lars Pettersson; Lars Svensson; Sven Thunman; Hans Öberg |

== Nordic combined ==
| Event | Gold | Silver | Bronze |
|---|---|---|---|
| Men's individual | Simon Slåttvik; Norway | Heikki Hasu; Finland | Sverre Stenersen; Norway |

== Ski jumping ==
| Event | Gold | Silver | Bronze |
|---|---|---|---|
| Men's individual | Arnfinn Bergmann; Norway | Torbjørn Falkanger; Norway | Karl Holmström; Sweden |

== Speed skating ==
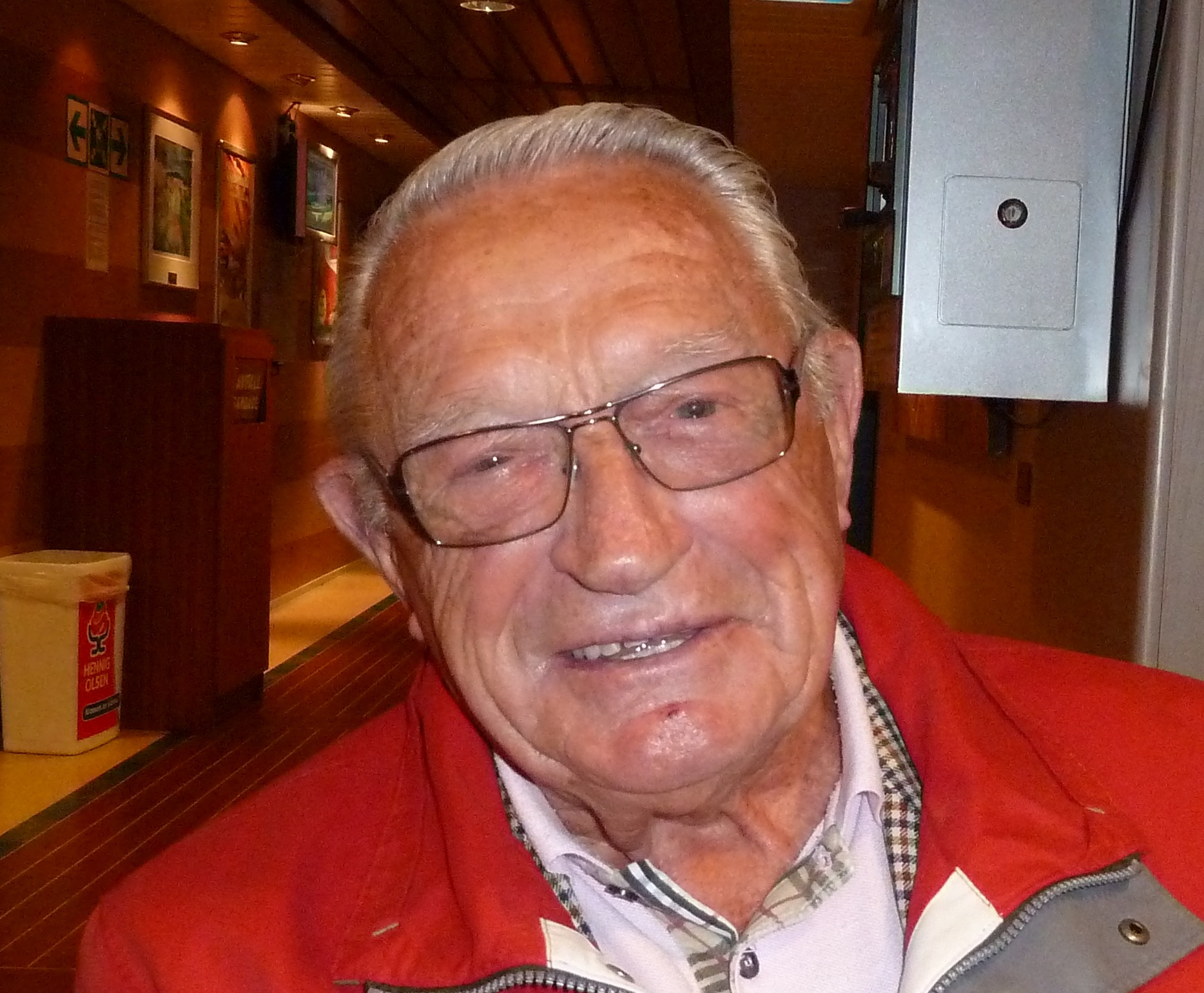
Hjalmar Andersen, the Norwegian speed skater who won three gold medals at the 1952 Winter Olympics, pictured in October 2010

| Event | Gold | Silver | Bronze |
|---|---|---|---|
| 500 metres | Ken Henry; United States | Don McDermott; United States | Gordon Audley; Canada |
| 500 metres | Ken Henry; United States | Don McDermott; United States | Arne Johansen; Norway |
| 1500 metres | Hjalmar Andersen; Norway | Wim van der Voort; Netherlands | Roald Aas; Norway |
| 5000 metres | Hjalmar Andersen; Norway | Kees Broekman; Netherlands | Sverre Haugli; Norway |
| 10000 metres | Hjalmar Andersen; Norway | Kees Broekman; Netherlands | Carl-Erik Asplund; Sweden |

== Multiple medallists ==
Athletes who won multiple medals at these Games are listed below by the number of medals won.

| Athlete | Nation | Sport | Gold | Silver | Bronze | Total |
|---|---|---|---|---|---|---|
| Hjalmar Andersen | Norway | Speed skating | 3 | 0 | 0 | 3 |
| Annemarie Buchner | Germany | Alpine skiing | 0 | 1 | 2 | 3 |
| Andrea Mead Lawrence | United States | Alpine skiing | 2 | 0 | 0 | 2 |
| Lorenz Nieberl | Germany | Bobsleigh | 2 | 0 | 0 | 2 |
| Andreas Ostler | Germany | Bobsleigh | 2 | 0 | 0 | 2 |
| Hallgeir Brenden | Norway | Cross-country skiing | 1 | 1 | 0 | 2 |
| Stein Eriksen | Norway | Alpine skiing | 1 | 1 | 0 | 2 |
| Heikki Hasu | Finland | Cross-country skiing | 1 | 1 | 0 | 2 |
| Tapio Mäkelä | Finland | Cross-country skiing | 1 | 1 | 0 | 2 |
| Othmar Schneider | Austria | Alpine skiing | 1 | 1 | 0 | 2 |
| Paavo Lonkila | Finland | Cross-country skiing | 1 | 0 | 1 | 2 |
| Stanley Benham | United States | Bobsleigh | 0 | 2 | 0 | 2 |
| Kees Broekman | Netherlands | Speed skating | 0 | 2 | 0 | 2 |
| Patrick Martin | United States | Bobsleigh | 0 | 2 | 0 | 2 |
| Magnar Estenstad | Norway | Cross-country skiing | 0 | 1 | 1 | 2 |
| Christian Pravda | Austria | Alpine skiing | 0 | 1 | 1 | 2 |
| Fritz Feierabend | Switzerland | Bobsleigh | 0 | 0 | 2 | 2 |
| Stephan Waser | Switzerland | Bobsleigh | 0 | 0 | 2 | 2 |

== See also ==
- 1952 Winter Olympics medal table
