= Canada at the 1952 Winter Olympics =

- IOC code: CAN
- NOC: Canadian Olympic Committee
- Website: www.olympic.ca (in English and French)

in Oslo. Norway 14 February 1952 – 25 February 1952
- Competitors: 39 (31 men, 8 women) in 6 sports
- Flag bearer: Gordon Audley
- Medals Ranked 6th: Gold 1 Silver 0 Bronze 1 Total 2

Winter Olympics appearances (overview)
- 1924; 1928; 1932; 1936; 1948; 1952; 1956; 1960; 1964; 1968; 1972; 1976; 1980; 1984; 1988; 1992; 1994; 1998; 2002; 2006; 2010; 2014; 2018; 2022; 2026

Canada competed at the 1952 Winter Olympics in Oslo, Norway. Canada has competed at every Winter Olympic Games.

== Medalists ==
Medal	Name	Sport	Event
Gold	Canada men's national ice hockey team (Edmonton Mercurys): George Abel; John Davies; Billy Dawe; Robert Dickson; Donald Gauf; William Dickson; Ralph Hansch; Robert Meyers; David Miller; Eric Paterson; Thomas Pollock; Allan Purvis; Gordon Robertson; Louis Secco; Francis Sullivan; Bob Watt	Ice hockey	Men's competition
Bronze	Gordon Audley	Speed skating	Men's 500m

== Alpine skiing ==
Men

Athlete	Event	Race 1		Race 2		Total	
Athlete	Event	Time	Rank	Time	Rank	Time	Rank
André Bertrand	Downhill					2:56.0	41
John Griffin	Downhill					2:52.2	32
Gordon Morrison	Downhill					2:51.1	31
Robert Richardson	Downhill					2:43.2	18
Gordon Morrison	Giant Slalom					2:54.2	46
John Griffin	Giant Slalom					2:49.9	37
André Bertrand	Giant Slalom					2:49.3	36
Robert Richardson	Giant Slalom					2:48.2	34
George Merry	Slalom	1:09.4	41	did not advance			
John Griffin	Slalom	1:07.2	34	did not advance			
André Bertrand	Slalom	1:07.0	32 Q	1:06.2	22	2:13.2	25
Robert Richardson	Slalom	1:06.8	31 Q	1:07.0	25	2:13.8	26

Women

Athlete	Event	Race 1		Race 2		Total	
Athlete	Event	Time	Rank	Time	Rank	Time	Rank
Lucille Wheeler	Downhill					1:59.5	27
Rhoda Wurtele-Eaves	Downhill					1:56.4	20
Rosemarie Schutz	Downhill					1:54.6	14
Joanne Hewson	Downhill					1:51.3	8
Joanne Hewson	Giant Slalom					2:23.9	30
Lucille Wheeler	Giant Slalom					2:22.2	27
Rosemarie Schutz	Giant Slalom					2:19.7	23
Rhoda Wurtele-Eaves	Giant Slalom					2:14.0	9
Rosemarie Schutz	Slalom	1:56.7	37	1:12.2	25	3:08.9	37
Lucille Wheeler	Slalom	1:12.2	21	1:16.2	34	2:28.4	26
Rhoda Wurtele-Eaves	Slalom	1:12.0	20	1:09.9	17	2:21.9	19
Joanne Hewson	Slalom	1:09.2	12	1:10.7	22	2:19.9	13

== Cross-country skiing ==
Men

Event	Athlete	Race	
Event	Athlete	Time	Rank
18 km	Jacques Carbonneau	1'17:37	70
18 km	Claude Richer	1'13:17	52

== Figure skating ==
Men

Athlete	CF	FS	Points	Places	Rank
Peter Firstbrook	4	4	173.122	43	5

Women

Athlete	CF	FS	Points	Places	Rank
Vera Smith	13	15	138.220	117	13
Marlene Smith	11	9	143.289	92	9
Suzanne Morrow	6	7	149.333	56	6

Pairs

Athletes	Points	Places	Rank
Frances Dafoe; Norris Bowden	10.489	48	5

== Ice hockey ==
The tournament was run in a round-robin format with nine teams participating.

Team	Pld	W	L	T	GF	GA	Pts
Canada (gold)	8	7	0	1	71	14	15
United States	8	6	1	1	43	21	13
Sweden	9	7	2	0	53	22	14
Czechoslovakia	9	6	3	0	50	23	12
Switzerland	8	4	4	0	40	40	8
Poland	8	2	5	1	21	56	5
Finland	8	2	6	0	21	60	4
West Germany	8	1	6	1	21	53	3
Norway	8	0	8	0	15	46	0

- Canada 15-1 Germany FR
- Canada 13-3 Finland
- Canada 11-0 Poland
- Canada 4-1 Czechoslovakia
- Canada 11-2 Switzerland
- Canada 3-2 Sweden
- Norway 2-11 Canada
- Canada 3-3 USA

Top scorers

Team	GP	G	A	Pts
(Canada) Billy Gibson	8	15	7	22
(Canada) David Miller	8	10	2	12

Gold:
Canada

Eric Paterson
Ralph Hansch
John Davies
Don Gauf
Robert Meyers
Thomas Pollock
Al Purvis
Billy Gibson
David Miller
George Abel
Billy Dawe
Robert Dickson
Gordon Robertson
Louis Secco
Francis Sullivan
Bob Watt

== Ski jumping ==
Athlete	Event	Jump 1			Jump 2			Total	
Athlete	Event	Distance	Points	Rank	Distance	Points	Rank	Points	Rank
Lucien Laferte	Normal hill	61.0 (fall)	64.5	42	59.5	98.0	21	162.5	41
Jacques Charland	Normal hill	62.5	95.5	28	61.0	94.5	25	190.0	25

== Speed skating ==
Men

Event	Athlete	Race	
Event	Athlete	Time	Rank
500 m	Ralf Olin	46.5	30
500 m	Craig Mackay	44.9	15
500 m	Frank Stack	44.8	12
500 m	Gordon Audley	44.0	3rd place, bronze medalist(s)
1500 m	Ralf Olin	2:29.3	29
1500 m	Craig MacKay	2:25.0	16
5000 m	Ralf Olin	8:54.2	25
5000 m	Craig MacKay	8:52.5	23
10,000 m	Craig MacKay	18:27.4	24
10,000 m	Ralf Olin	18:22.8	21
