= List of Olympic medallists for Canada =

This is a list of Canadians who have won Olympic medals in the Olympics Games:

== Gold medallists ==
=== Summer Olympics ===
==== 2024 ====
- Summer McIntosh - 200 m Butterfly - Women, 200 m Individual Medley - Women, 400 m Individual Medley - Women
- Aaron Brown, Andre De Grasse, Brendon Rodney, Jerome Blake - 4 × 100 m Relay - Men
- Christa Deguchi - 57kg Judo - Women
- Philip Kim (Phil Wizard) - Breakdancing
- Katie Vincent - Canoe/Kayak
- Ethan Katzberg - Hammer Throw - Men
- Camryn Rogers - Hammer Throw - Women

==== 2020 ====
- Maggie Mac Neil – Swimming, Women's 100 m butterfly
- Maude Charron - Weightlifting, Women's 64kg
- Susanne Grainger, Lisa Roman, Christine Roper, Sydney Payne, Madison Mailey, Kasia Gruchalla-Wesierski, Avalon Wasteneys, Andrea Proske, Kristen Kit (cox) - Rowing, Women's eight
- Andre De Grasse – Athletics, Men's 200 m
- Damian Warner – Athletics, Men's decathlon
- Canada women's national soccer team: Janine Beckie, Kadeisha Buchanan, Gabrielle Carle, Jessie Fleming, Vanessa Gilles, Julia Grosso, Jordyn Huitema, Stephanie Labbé, Ashley Lawrence, Adriana Leon, Erin McLeod, Nichelle Prince, Quinn, Jayde Riviere, Deanne Rose, Sophie Schmidt, Desiree Scott, Kailen Sheridan, Christine Sinclair, Évelyne Viens, and Shelina Zadorsky- Soccer, Women's team
- Kelsey Mitchell - Cycling, Women's track cycling sprint

==== 2016 ====
- Penny Oleksiak – Swimming, Women's 100 m freestyle
- Rosannagh MacLennan – Trampoline
- Derek Drouin – Athletics, Men's high jump
- Erica Wiebe - Wrestling, Women's freestyle 75 kg

==== 2012 ====
- Rosannagh MacLennan – Trampoline
- Christine Girard – Weightlifting

==== 2008 ====
- Carol Huynh – Wrestling, Women's Freestyle 48 kg
- Andrew Byrnes, Kyle Hamilton, Malcolm Howard, Adam Kreek, Kevin Light, Brian Price (cox), Ben Rutledge, Dominic Sieterle and Jake Wetzel – Rowing, Men's eight
- Eric Lamaze on Hickstead – Equestrian, Individual jumping

==== 2004 ====
- Kyle Shewfelt – Gymnastics, Men's Floor Exercises
- Lori-Ann Muenzer – Cycling, Women's Sprint
- Adam van Koeverden – Canoeing, Men's K-1 500 m

==== 2000 ====
- Simon Whitfield – Triathlon, Men's Competition
- Daniel Igali – Wrestling, Men's Freestyle Lightweight (69 kg)
- Sébastien Lareau and Daniel Nestor – Tennis, Men's Doubles

==== 1996 ====
- Donovan Bailey – Athletics, Men's 100 m
- Robert Esmie, Glenroy Gilbert, Bruny Surin, Carlton Chambers, Donovan Bailey – Athletics, Men's 4 × 100 m Relay
- Marnie McBean and Kathleen Heddle – Rowing, Women's Double Sculls

==== 1992 ====
- Mark McKoy – Athletics, Men's 110 m Hurdles
- John Wallace, Bruce Robertson, Michael Forgeron, Darren Barber, Robert Marland, Michael Rascher, Andy Crosby, Derek Porter and Terrence Paul – Rowing, Men's Eights with Coxswain
- Kathleen Heddle and Marnie McBean – Rowing, Women's Pairs
- Kay Worthington, Kirsten Barnes, Jessica Monroe, and Brenda Taylor – Rowing, Women's Coxless Fours
- Marnie McBean, Kathleen Heddle, Kirsten Barnes, Brenda Taylor, Jessica Monroe, Kay Worthington, Megan Delehanty, Shannon Crawford and Lesley Thompson – Rowing, Women's Eights with Coxswain
- Mark Tewksbury – Swimming, Men's 100 m Backstroke
- Sylvie Fréchette – Synchronized Swimming, Women's Solo

==== 1988 ====
- Lennox Lewis – Boxing, Men's Super Heavyweight
- Carolyn Waldo and Michelle Cameron – Synchronized Swimming, Women's Duet
- Carolyn Waldo – Synchronized Swimming, Women's Solo

==== 1984 ====
- Larry Cain – Canoeing, Men's C-1 500 m
- Alwyn Morris and Hugh Fisher – Canoeing, Men's K-2 1000 m
- Sylvie Bernier – Diving, Women's 3 m Springboard
- Lori Fung – Rhythmic Gymnastics, Women's Individual All-round
- Pat Turner, Kevin Neufeld, Mark Evans, Grant Main, Paul Steele, J. Michael Evans, Dean Crawford, Blair Horn, and Brian McMahon – Rowing, Men's Eight with Coxswain (see also 1984 Canadian Mens Rowing Eight)
- Linda Thom – Shooting, Women's 25 m Pistol
- Alex Baumann – Swimming, Men's 200 m Individual Medley
- Alex Baumann – Swimming, Men's 400 m Individual Medley
- Victor Davis – Swimming, Men's 200 m Breaststroke
- Anne Ottenbrite – Swimming, Women's 200 m Breaststroke

==== 1980 ====
Canada was one of the 64 nations to boycott the Moscow games, and did not compete in the summer games for the first time since 1896.

==== 1976 ====
Canada did not win any gold medals at the Montreal games; this was the only time that a host country for the summer Olympics failed to win at least one gold medal.

==== 1972 ====
Canada did not win any gold medals at the Munich games.

==== 1968 ====
- Jim Day, Thomas Gayford, James Elder – Equestrian, Team Jumping Grand Prix

==== 1964 ====
- Roger Jackson and George Hungerford – Rowing, Men's Coxless Pair

==== 1960 ====
Canada did not win any gold medals at the Rome games.

==== 1956 ====
- Archibald MacKinnon, Lorne Loomer, Walter D'Hondt, and Donald Arnold – Rowing, Men's Coxless Four
- Raymond Ouellette – Shooting, Men's 50 m Rifle Prone

==== 1952 ====
- George Genereux – Shooting, Men's Trap

==== 1948 ====
Canada did not win any gold medals at the London games.

==== 1936 ====
- Frank Amyot – Canoeing, Men's C-1 1000 m

==== 1932 ====
- Duncan McNaughton – Athletics, Men's High Jump
- Horace Gwynne – Boxing, Men's Bantamweight

==== 1928 ====
- Percy Williams – Athletics, Men's 100 m
- Percy Williams – Athletics, Men's 200 m
- Ethel Catherwood – Athletics, Women's High Jump
- Ethel Smith, Bobbie Rosenfeld, Myrtle Cook, Jane Bell – Athletics, Women's 4 × 100 m Relay

==== 1924 ====
Canada did not win any gold medals at the Paris games.

==== 1920 ====
- Winnipeg Falcons – Ice Hockey
- Earl Thomson – Athletics, Men's 110 m Hurdles
- Bert Schneider – Boxing, Men's Welterweight

==== 1912 ====
- George Goulding – Athletics, Men's 10 km Walk
- George Hodgson – Swimming, Men's 400 m Freestyle
- George Hodgson – Swimming, Men's 1500 m Freestyle

==== 1908 ====
- Robert Kerr – Athletics, Men's 200 m
- Canada – Lacrosse
- Walter Ewing – Shooting, Men's Trap

==== 1906 ====
- Billy Sherring – Athletics, Men's Marathon

The 1906 games in Athens are no longer considered official by the IOC.

==== 1904 ====
- Etienne Desmarteau – Athletics, Men's 56 lb Weight Throw
- George Lyon – Golf, Individual
- Galt Football Club – Football
- Winnipeg Shamrocks – Lacrosse

==== 1900 ====
- ~~George Orton – Athletics, 2500 m Steeplechase~~
  Notes: Orton competed at the 1900 Summer Olympics, winning a gold medal and a bronze medal in athletics. As he represented the American University of Pennsylvania, his results are attributed to the United States.

==== 1896 ====
Canada did not participate in the Athens games

=== Winter Olympics ===
==== 2026 ====
- Mikaël Kingsbury – Freestyle skiing, Men's dual moguls
- Megan Oldham – Freestyle skiing, Women's big air
- Ivanie Blondin, Valérie Maltais, Isabelle Weidemann – Speed skating, Women's team pursuit
- Steven Dubois – Short track speed skating, Men's 500 metres
- Brad Jacobs, Marc Kennedy, Brett Gallant, Ben Hebert, Tyler Tardi – Curling, Men's tournament

==== 2022 ====
- Max Parrot – Snowboarding, Men's slopestyle
- Ivanie Blondin, Valérie Maltais, Isabelle Weidemann – Speed skating, Women's team pursuit
- Pascal Dion, Steven Dubois, Jordan Pierre-Gilles, Charles Hamelin, Maxime Laoun – Short track speed skating, Men's 5000 metre relay
- Canada women's national ice hockey team: Erin Ambrose, Ashton Bell, Kristen Campbell, Emily Clark, Mélodie Daoust, Ann-Renée Desbiens, Renata Fast, Sarah Fillier, Brianne Jenner, Rebecca Johnston, Jocelyne Larocque, Emma Maltais, Emerance Maschmeyer, Sarah Nurse, Marie-Philip Poulin, Jamie Lee Rattray, Jill Saulnier, Ella Shelton, Natalie Spooner, Laura Stacey, Claire Thompson|Blayre Turnbull, Micah Zandee-Hart – Ice hockey, Women's tournament

==== 2018 ====
- Patrick Chan, Kaetlyn Osmond, Gabrielle Daleman, Meagan Duhamel, Eric Radford, Tessa Virtue, Scott Moir – Figure skating, Team event
- Mikaël Kingsbury, Freestyle, Men's moguls
- Kaitlyn Lawes, John Morris – Curling, Mixed doubles
- Ted-Jan Bloemen – Speed skating, Men's 10,000 metres
- Samuel Girard – Short track speed skating, Men's 1000 metres
- Justin Kripps, Alexander Kopacz – Bobsleigh, Two-man
- Cassie Sharpe – Freestyle skiing, Women's halfpipe
- Tessa Virtue, Scott Moir – Figure skating, Ice dancing
- Brady Leman – Freestyle skiing, Men's ski cross
- Kelsey Serwa – Freestyle skiing, Women's ski cross
- Sébastien Toutant – Snowboarding, Men's big air

==== 2014 ====
- Justine Dufour-Lapointe – Freestyle skiing, Women's moguls
- Alexandre Bilodeau – Freestyle skiing, Men's moguls
- Charles Hamelin – Short track, Men's 1500 m
- Dara Howell – Freestyle skiing, women's slopestyle
- Kaillie Humphries, Heather Moyse – Bobsleigh, two woman
- Jennifer Jones, Kaitlyn Lawes, Jill Officer, Dawn McEwen, Kirsten Wall – Curling, Women's tournament
- Canada women's national ice hockey team: Meghan Agosta-Marciano, Gillian Apps, Mélodie Daoust, Laura Fortino, Jayna Hefford, Haley Irwin, Brianne Jenner, Rebecca Johnston, Charline Labonté, Geneviève Lacasse, Jocelyne Larocque, Meaghan Mikkelson, Caroline Ouellette, Marie-Philip Poulin, Lauriane Rougeau, Natalie Spooner, Shannon Szabados, Jenn Wakefield, Catherine Ward, Tara Watchorn, Hayley Wickenheiser – Ice hockey, Women's tournament
- Marielle Thompson – Freestyle skiing, women's ski cross
- Brad Jacobs, Ryan Fry, E. J. Harnden, Ryan Harnden, Caleb Flaxey – Curling, Men's tournament
- Canada men's national ice hockey team: Jamie Benn, Patrice Bergeron, Jay Bouwmeester, Jeff Carter, Sidney Crosby, Drew Doughty, Matt Duchene, Ryan Getzlaf, Dan Hamhuis, Duncan Keith, Chris Kunitz, Roberto Luongo, Patrick Marleau, Rick Nash, Corey Perry, Alex Pietrangelo, Carey Price, Patrick Sharp, Mike Smith, Martin St. Louis, P. K. Subban, John Tavares, Jonathan Toews, Marc-Édouard Vlasic, Shea Weber – Ice hockey, men's tournament

==== 2010 ====
- Alexandre Bilodeau – Freestyle skiing, Men's moguls
- Maëlle Ricker – Snowboarding, Women's snowboard cross
- Christine Nesbitt – Speed skating, Women's 1000 metres
- Jon Montgomery – Skeleton, Men's
- Scott Moir, Tessa Virtue – Figure skating, Ice dancing
- Ashleigh McIvor – Freestyle skiing, Women's ski cross
- Kaillie Humphries, Heather Moyse – Bobsleigh, Two-woman
- Canada women's national ice hockey team: Meghan Agosta, Gillian Apps, Tessa Bonhomme, Jennifer Botterill, Jayna Hefford, Haley Irwin, Rebecca Johnston, Becky Kellar, Gina Kingsbury, Charline Labonté, Carla MacLeod, Meaghan Mikkelson, Caroline Ouellette, Cherie Piper, Marie-Philip Poulin, Colleen Sostorics, Kim St-Pierre, Shannon Szabados, Sarah Vaillancourt, Catherine Ward, Hayley Wickenheiser – Ice hockey, Women's tournament
- Charles Hamelin – Short track, Men's 500 metres
- Guillaume Bastille, Charles Hamelin, François Hamelin, Olivier Jean, François-Louis Tremblay – Short track, Men's 5000 metre relay
- Mathieu Giroux, Lucas Makowsky, Denny Morrison – Speed Skating, Men's team pursuit
- Jasey-Jay Anderson – Snowboarding, Men's parallel giant slalom
- Adam Enright, Ben Hebert, Marc Kennedy, Kevin Martin, John Morris – Curling, Men's
- Canada men's national ice hockey team: Patrice Bergeron, Dan Boyle, Martin Brodeur, Sidney Crosby, Drew Doughty, Marc-André Fleury, Ryan Getzlaf, Dany Heatley, Jarome Iginla, Duncan Keith, Roberto Luongo, Patrick Marleau, Brenden Morrow, Rick Nash, Scott Niedermayer, Corey Perry, Chris Pronger, Mike Richards, Brent Seabrook, Eric Staal, Joe Thornton Jonathan Toews, Shea Weber – Ice hockey, Men's tournament

==== 2006 ====
- Jennifer Heil – Freestyle skiing, Women's moguls
- Duff Gibson – Skeleton, Men's
- Canada women's national ice hockey team: Meghan Agosta, Gillian Apps, Jennifer Botterill, Cassie Campbell, Gillian Ferrari, Danielle Goyette, Jayna Hefford, Becky Kellar, Gina Kingsbury, Charline Labonté, Carla MacLeod, Caroline Ouellette, Cherie Piper, Cheryl Pounder, Colleen Sostorics, Kim St-Pierre, Vicky Sunohara, Sarah Vaillancourt, Katie Weatherston, Hayley Wickenheiser – Ice hockey, Women's
- Cindy Klassen – Speed skating, Women's 1500 m
- Chandra Crawford – Cross-country skiing, Women's sprint
- Brad Gushue, Jamie Korab, Russ Howard, Mark Nichols, Mike Adam – Curling, Men's
- Clara Hughes – Speed skating, Women's 5000 m

==== 2002 ====
- Beckie Scott – Cross-country skiing, Women's 2 × 5 kilometre pursuit
- Jamie Salé, David Pelletier – Figure skating, Pairs
- Canada men's national ice hockey team: Ed Belfour, Rob Blake, Eric Brewer, Martin Brodeur, Theoren Fleury, Adam Foote, Simon Gagné, Jarome Iginla, Curtis Joseph, Ed Jovanovski, Paul Kariya, Mario Lemieux, Eric Lindros, Al MacInnis, Scott Niedermayer, Joe Nieuwendyk, Owen Nolan, Michael Peca, Chris Pronger, Joe Sakic, Brendan Shanahan, Ryan Smyth, Steve Yzerman – Ice hockey || Men's tournament
- Canada women's national ice hockey team: Dana Antal, Kelly Béchard, Jennifer Botterill, Thérèse Brisson, Cassie Campbell, Isabelle Chartrand, Lori Dupuis, Danielle Goyette, Geraldine Heaney, Jayna Hefford, Becky Kellar, Caroline Ouellette, Cherie Piper, Cheryl Pounder, Tammy Lee Shewchuk, Sami Jo Small, Colleen Sostorics, Kim St-Pierre, Vicky Sunohara, Hayley Wickenheiser – Ice hockey, Women's tournament
- Marc Gagnon – Short track speed skating, Men's 500 m
- Éric Bédard, Marc Gagnon, Jonathan Guilmette, François-Louis Tremblay, Mathieu Turcotte – Short track speed skating, Men's 5000 m relay
- Catriona Le May Doan – Speed skating, Women's 500 m

==== 1998 ====
- Pierre Lueders, David MacEachern – Bobsleigh, two-man
- Jan Betker, Atina Ford, Marcia Gudereit, Joan McCusker, Sandra Schmirler – Curling, Women's competition
- Eric Bedard, Derrick Campbell, François Drolet, Marc Gagnon – Short track speed skating, Men's 5000 m relay
- Annie Perreault – Short track speed skating, Women's 500 m
- Ross Rebagliati – Snowboarding, Men's giant slalom
- Catriona Le May Doan – Speed skating, Women's 500 m

==== 1994 ====
- Jean-Luc Brassard – Freestyle skiing, Men's moguls
- Myriam Bédard – Biathlon, Women's individual and Women's sprint

==== 1992 ====
- Kerrin Lee-Gartner – Alpine skiing, Women's downhill
- Angela Cutrone, Sylvie Daigle, Nathalie Lambert, Annie Perreault – Short track speed skating, Women's 3000 metre relay

==== 1988 ====
Canada won no gold medals at the Calgary games

==== 1984 ====
- Gaétan Boucher – Speed skating, Men's 1000 metres and Men's 1500 metres

==== 1980 ====
Canada won no gold medals at the Lake Placid games

==== 1976 ====
- Kathy Kreiner – Alpine skiing, Women's giant slalom

==== 1972 ====
Canada won no gold medals at the Sapporo games

==== 1968 ====
- Nancy Greene – Alpine skiing, Women's giant slalom

==== 1964 ====
- Vic Emery, Peter Kirby, Douglas Anakin, John Emery – Bobsleigh, Four-man

==== 1960 ====
- Anne Heggtveit – Alpine skiing, Women's slalom
- Barbara Wagner, Robert Paul – Figure skating, Pairs

==== 1956 ====
Canada won no gold medals at the Cortina d'Ampezzo games

==== 1952 ====
- Canada men's national ice hockey team: George Abel, John Davies, Billy Dawe, Robert Dickson|Donald Gauf, William Dickson, Ralph Hansch, Robert Meyers, David Miller, Eric Paterson, Thomas Pollock, Allan Purvis, Gordon Robertson, Louis Secco, Francis Sullivan|Bob Watt – Ice hockey, men's competition

==== 1948 ====
- Barbara Ann Scott – Figure skating, Women's singles
- Canada men's national ice hockey team: Hubert Brooks, Murray Dowey, Bernard Dunster, R.A. Forbes, A. Gilpin, Jean Gravelle, Patrick Guzzo, Walter Halder, Thomas Hibberd, Ross King, Henri-André Laperriere, John Lecompte, J. Leichnitz, George Mara, Albert Renaud, Reginald Schroeter, Irving Taylor – Ice hockey, Men's competition

==== 1936 ====
Canada won no gold medals at the Garmisch-Partenkirchen games

==== 1932 ====
- Canada men's national ice hockey team: William Cockburn, Clifford Crowley, Albert Duncanson, George Garbutt, Roy Henkel, Victor Lindquist, Norman Malloy, Walter Monson, Kenneth Moore, Romeo Rivers, Hack Simpson, Hugh Sutherland, Stanley Wagner, Alston Wise – Ice hockey, Men's competition

==== 1928 ====
- Canada men's national ice hockey team: Charles Delahaye, Frank Fisher, Grant Gordon, Louis Hudson, Norbert Mueller, Herbert Plaxton, Hugh Plaxton, Roger Plaxton, John Porter, Frank Sullivan, Joseph Sullivan, Ross Taylor, Dave Trottier – Ice hockey, Men's competition

==== 1924 ====
- Canada men's national ice hockey team: Jack Cameron, Ernie Collett, Bert McCaffrey, Harold McMunn, Duncan Munro, Beattie Ramsay, Cyril Slater, Reginald "Hooley" Smith, Harry Watson – Ice hockey, Men's competition

== Silver medallists ==
=== Summer Olympics ===
==== 2024 ====
- Summer McIntosh – Swimming, Women's 400 m freestyle
- Canada women's national rugby sevens team
  Caroline Crossley, Olivia Apps, Alysha Corrigan, Asia Hogan-Rochester, Chloe Daniels, Charity Williams, Florence Symonds, Carissa Norsten, Krissy Scurfield, Fancy Bermudez, Piper Logan, Keyara Wardley – Rugby sevens, Women's tournament
- Abigail Dent, Caileigh Filmer, Kasia Gruchalla-Wesierski, Maya Meschkuleit, Sydney Payne, Jessica Sevick, Kristina Walker, Avalon Wasteneys, Kristen Kit – Rowing, Women's eight
- Josh Liendo – Swimming, Men's 100 m butterfly
- Maude Charron – Weightlifting Women's 59 kg
- Melissa Humana-Paredes, Brandie Wilkerson – Beach volleyball, Women's tournament
- Marco Arop – Athletics, Men's 800 m

==== 2020 ====
- Kayla Sanchez, Maggie Mac Neil, Taylor Ruck, Rebecca Smith, Penny Oleksiak – Swimming, Women's 4 × 100 m freestyle relay
- Jennifer Abel, Melissa Citrini-Beaulieu – Diving, Women's synchronized 3 metre springboard
- Kylie Masse – Swimming, Women's 100 m backstroke and Women's 200 m backstroke
- Laurence Vincent Lapointe – Canoeing, Women's C-1 200 metres
- Mohammed Ahmed – Athletics, Men's 5000 m
- Jerome Blake, Aaron Brown, Andre De Grasse, Brendon Rodney – Athletics, Men's 4 × 100 m relay

==== 2016 ====
- Penny Oleksiak – Swimming, Women's 100 m butterfly
- Lindsay Jennerich, Patricia Obee – Rowing, Women's lightweight double sculls
- Andre De Grasse – Athletics, Men's 200 m

==== 2012 ====
- Gabriel Bergen, Jeremiah Brown, Andrew Byrnes, Will Crothers, Douglas Csima, Robert Gibson, Malcolm Howard, Conlin McCabe, Brian Price – Rowing, Men's eight
- Ashley Brzozowicz, Janine Hanson, Krista Guloien, Darcy Marquardt, Natalie Mastracci, Andréanne Morin, Lesley Thompson, Rachelle Viinberg, Lauren Wilkinson – Rowing, Women's eight
- Ryan Cochrane – Swimming, Men's 1500 m freestyle
- Derek Drouin – Athletics, Men's high jump
- Adam van Koeverden – Canoeing, Men's K-1 1000 m
- Tonya Verbeek – Wrestling, Women's freestyle 55 kg

==== 2008 ====
- David Calder, Scott Frandsen – Rowing, Men's coxless pair
- Karen Cockburn – Gymnastics, Women's trampoline
- Mac Cone, Jill Henselwood, Eric Lamaze, Ian Millar – Equestrian, Team jumping
- Simon Whitfield – Triathlon, Men's event
- Jason Burnett – Gymnastics, Men's trampoline
- Alexandre Despatie – Diving, Men's 3 m springboard
- Emilie Heymans – Diving, Women's 10 m platform
- Karine Sergerie – Taekwondo, Women's 67 kg
- Adam van Koeverden – Canoeing, Men's K-1 500 m

==== 2004 ====
- Karen Cockburn – Gymnastics, Women's trampoline
- Cameron Baerg, Thomas Herschmiller, Jake Wetzel, Barney Williams – Rowing, Men's four
- Tonya Verbeek – Wrestling, Women's freestyle 55 kg
- Alexandre Despatie – Diving, Men's 3 m springboard
- Marie-Hélène Prémont – Cycling, Women's cross-country
- Ross MacDonald – Sailing, Star class

==== 2000 ====
- Caroline Brunet – Canoeing, Women's K-1 500 metres
- Nicolas Gill – Judo, Men's 100 kg
- Anne Montminy, Émilie Heymans – Diving, Women's synchronized 10 metre platform

==== 1996 ====
- Marianne Limpert – Swimming, Women's 200 metre individual medley
- Silken Laumann – Rowing, Women's single sculls
- Derek Porter – Rowing, Men's single sculls
- Brian Walton – Cycling, Men's points race
- Lesley Thompson, Tosha Tsang, Anna van der Kamp, Heather McDermid, Jessica Monroe, Emma Robinson, Alison Korn, Theresa Luke, Maria Maunder – Rowing, Women's eight
- Brian Peaker, Dave Boyes, Gavin Hassett, Jeffrey Lay – Rowing, Men's lightweight coxless four
- Alison Sydor – Cycling, Women's cross-country
- Guivi Sissaouri – Wrestling, Men's freestyle 57 kg
- Lisa Alexander, Janice Bremner, Karen Clark, Karen Fonteyne, Sylvie Fréchette, Valerie Hould-Marchand, Kasia Kulesza, Christine Larsen, Cari Read, Erin Woodley – Synchronized swimming, Women's Team
- Caroline Brunet – Canoeing, Women's K-1 500 metres
- David Defiagbon – Boxing, Men's heavyweight

==== 1992 ====
- Guillaume LeBlanc – Athletics, Men's 20 kilometres walk
- Penny Vilagos, Vicky Vilagos – Synchronized swimming, Women's duet
- Jeffrey Thue – Wrestling, Men's freestyle 130 kg
- Mark Leduc – Boxing, Light welterweight

==== 1988 ====
- Victor Davis, Sandy Goss, Tom Ponting, Mark Tewksbury – Swimming, Men's 4 × 100 metre medley relay
- Egerton Marcus – Boxing, Middleweight

==== 1984 ====
- Steve Bauer – Cycling, Men's individual road race
- Victor Davis – Swimming, Men's 100 metre breaststroke
- Curt Harnett – Cycling, Men's 1 km time trial
- Anne Ottenbrite – Swimming, Women's 100 metre breaststroke
- Jacques Demers – Weightlifting, Men's 75 kg
- Betty Craig, Tricia Smith – Rowing, Women's coxless pair
- Barbara Armbrust, Marilyn Brain, Angela Schneider, Lesley Thompson-Willie, Jane Tregunno – Rowing, Women's coxed four
- Victor Davis, Sandy Goss, Tom Ponting, Mike West – Swimming, Men's 4 × 100 metre medley relay
- Evert Bastet, Terry McLaughlin – Sailing, Flying Dutchman
- Sharon Hambrook, Kelly Kryczka – Synchronized swimming, Women's duet
- Robert Molle – Wrestling, Men's freestyle +100 kg
- Alexandra Barré, Sue Holloway – Canoeing, Women's K-2 500 metres
- Larry Cain – Canoeing, Men's C-1 1000 metres
- Angela Bailey, France Gareau, Marita Payne, Angella Taylor – Athletics, Women's 4 × 100 metres relay
- Charmaine Crooks, Molly Killingbeck, Marita Payne, Jillian Richardson, Dana Wright – Athletics, Women's 4 × 400 metres relay
- Shawn O'Sullivan – Boxing, Men's light middleweight
- Willie deWit – Boxing, Men's heavyweight
- Carolyn Waldo – Synchronized swimming, Women's solo

==== 1980 ====
Canada was one of the 64 nations to boycott the Moscow games, and did not compete in the summer games for the first time since 1896.

==== 1976 ====
- Clay Evans, Gary MacDonald, Steve Pickell, Graham Smith – Swimming, Men's 4 × 100 metre medley relay
- Cheryl Gibson – Swimming, Women's 400 metre individual medley
- Michel Vaillancourt – Equestrian, Individual jumping
- John Wood – Canoeing, Men's C-1 500 metres
- Greg Joy – Athletics, Men's high jump

==== 1972 ====
- Bruce Robertson – Swimming, Men's 100 m butterfly
- Leslie Cliff – Swimming, Women's 400 m individual medley

==== 1968 ====
- Elaine Tanner – Swimming, Women's 100 m backstroke and Women's 200 m backstroke
- Ralph Hutton – Swimming, Men's 400 m freestyle

==== 1964 ====
- Bill Crothers – Athletics, Men's 800 m
- Doug Rogers – Judo, Men's +80 kg

==== 1960 ====
- Donald Arnold, Walter D'Hondt, Nelson Kuhn, John Lecky, Kenneth Loomer, Bill McKerlich, Archibald MacKinnon, Glenn Mervyn, and Sohen Biln – Rowing, Men's eight with coxswain

==== 1956 ====
- Philip Kueber, Richard McClure, Robert Wilson, David Helliwell, Wayne Pretty, Bill McKerlich, Douglas McDonald, Lawrence West, Carlton Ogawa – Rowing, Men's eight with coxswain

==== 1952 ====
- Kenneth Lane, Donald Hawgood – Canoeing, Men's C-2 10000 m
- Gerry Gratton – Weightlifting, Men's 75 kg (middleweight)

==== 1948 ====
- Douglas Bennett – Canoeing, Men's C-1 1000 metres

==== 1936 ====
- Gordon Aitchison, Ian Allison, Arthur Chapman, Chuck Chapman, Edward Dawson, Irving Meretsky, Stanley Nantais, James Stewart, Malcolm Wiseman, Doug Peden – Basketball
- John Loaring – Athletics, Men's 400 m hurdles
- Frank Saker and Harvey Charters – Canoeing, Men's C-2 10000 m

==== 1932 ====
- Alex Wilson – Athletics, Men's 800 m
- Hilda Strike – Athletics, women's 100 m
- Mildred Fizzell, Lillian Palmer, Mary Frizzel and Hilda Strike – Athletics, women's 4 × 100 m relay
- Ernest Cribb, Harry Jones, Peter Gordon, Hubert Wallace, Ronald Maitland, and George Gyles – Sailing, 8 m class
- Daniel MacDonald – Wrestling, Men's freestyle welterweight (66–72 kg)

==== 1928 ====
- Jimmy Ball – Athletics, Men's 400 m
- Bobbie Rosenfeld – Athletics, Women's 100 m
- Jack Guest, Joseph Wright Jr. – Rowing, Men's double sculls
- Donald Stockton – Wrestling, Men's freestyle middleweight

==== 1924 ====
- Archibald Black, Colin Finlayson, George MacKay, William Wood – Rowing, Men's coxless four
- Arthur Bell, Ivor Campbell, Robert Hunter, William Langford, Harold Little, John Smith, Warren Snyder, Norman Taylor, William Wallace – Rowing, Men's eight
- William Barnes, George Beattie, John Black, Robert Montgomery, Samuel Newton, Samuel Vance – Shooting, Men's team clay pigeons

==== 1920 ====
- Clifford Graham – Boxing, Men's bantamweight
- Georges Prud'Homme – Boxing, Men's middleweight
- George Vernot – Swimming, Men's 1500 m freestyle

==== 1912 ====
- Duncan Gillis – Athletics, Men's hammer throw
- Calvin Bricker – Athletics, Men's long jump

==== 1908 ====
- Garfield MacDonald – Athletics, Men's triple jump
- George Beattie – Shooting, Men's trap
- George Beattie, Walter Ewing, Mylie Fletcher, David McMackon, George Vivian, Arthur Westover – Shooting, Men's team trap

==== 1904 ====
- Alan Bailey, Phil Boyd, Thomas Loudon, Don MacKenzie, George Reiffenstein, William Rice, George Strange, William Wadsworth, Joseph Wright – Rowing, Men's eight

==== 1900 ====
Canada won no silver medals at the Paris games

==== 1896 ====
Canada did not participated in the Athens games

=== Winter Olympics ===
==== 2022 ====
- Mikaël Kingsbury – Freestyle skiing, Men's moguls
- Steven Dubois – Short track speed skating, Men's 1500 metres
- Éliot Grondin – Snowboarding, Men's snowboard cross
- Isabelle Weidemann – Speed skating, Women's 5000 metres
- Marielle Thompson – Freestyle skiing, Women's ski cross
- Cassie Sharpe – Freestyle skiing, Women's halfpipe
- Laurent Dubreuil – Speed skating, Men's 1000 metres
- Ivanie Blondin – Speed skating, Women's mass start

==== 2018 ====
- Max Parrot – Snowboarding, Men's Slopestyle
- Ted-Jan Bloemen – Speed Skating, Men's 5000m
- Justine Dufour-Lapointe – Skiing, Women's moguls
- Laurie Blouin – Snowboarding, Women's Slopestyle
- Alex Gough, Sam Edney, Tristan Walker, Justin Snith – Luge, Team relay
- Canada women's national ice hockey team: Shannon Szabados, Geneviève Lacasse, Ann-Renée Desbiens, Jocelyne Larocque, Brigette Lacquette, Lauriane Rougeau, Laura Fortino, Meaghan Mikkelson, Renata Fast, Meghan Agosta, Rebecca Johnston, Laura Stacey, Jennifer Wakefield, Jillian Saulnier, Mélodie Daoust, Bailey Bram, Brianne Jenner, Sarah Nurse, Haley Irwin, Natalie Spooner, Emily Clark, Marie-Philip Poulin, Blayre Turnbull – Ice hockey, Women's tournament
- Kim Boutin – Speed skating, Women's 1000m
- Brittany Phelan – Skiing, Women's ski cross

==== 1952 ====
Canada won no silver medals at the Oslo games

==== 1948 ====
Canada won no silver medals at the St. Moritz games

==== 1928 ====
Canada won no silver medals at the St. Moritz games

==== 1924 ====
Canada won no silver medals at the Chamonix games

== Bronze medallists ==
=== Summer Olympics ===
==== 2024 ====
- Eleanor Harvey – Fencing, Women's individual foil
- Rylan Wiens, Nathan Zsombor-Murray – Diving, Men's 10m synchro
- Ilya Kharun – Swimming, Men's 200m butterfly, Men's 100m butterfly
- Sophiane Méthot – Women's Trampoline
- Gabriela Dabrowski, Félix Auger-Aliassime – Tennis, Mixed doubles
- Kylie Masse – Swimming, Women's 200m backstroke
- Wyatt Sanford – Boxing, Men's 63.5kg
- Alysha Newman – Athletics, Women's Pole Vault
- Skylar Park – Taekwondo, Women's 57kg
- Sloan MacKenzie, Katie Vincent – Canoe/Kayak Sprint, Women's C-2 500m

==== 2020 ====
- Jessica Klimkait – Judo, Women's 57 kg
- Canada women's national softball team: Jenna Caira, Emma Entzminger, Larissa Franklin, Jennifer Gilbert, Sara Groenewegen, Kelsey Harshman, Victoria Hayward, Danielle Lawrie, Janet Leung, Joey Lye, Erika Polidori, Kaleigh Rafter, Lauren Regula, Jennifer Salling, Natalie Wideman – Softball, Women's tournament
- Catherine Beauchemin-Pinard – Judo, Women's 63 kg
- Penny Oleksiak – Swimming, Women's 200 m freestyle
- Caileigh Filmer, Hillary Janssens – Rowing, Women's coxless pair
- Kayla Sanchez, Maggie Mac Neil, Kylie Masse, Sydney Pickrem, Taylor Ruck, Penny Oleksiak – Swimming||Women's 4 × 100 m medley relay
- Andre De Grasse – Athletics, Men's 100 m
- Lauriane Genest – Cycling, Women's keirin
- Evan Dunfee – Athletics, Men's 50 kilometres walk
- Katie Vincent, Laurence Vincent Lapointe – Canoeing, Women's C-2 500 metres

==== 1980 ====
Canada was one of the 64 nations to boycott the Moscow games, and did not compete in the summer games for the first time since 1896.

==== 1960 ====
Canada won no bronze medals at the Rome games

==== 1952 ====
Canada won no bronze medals at the Helsinki games

==== 1896 ====
Canada did not participated in the Athens games

=== Winter Olympics ===
==== 2022 ====
- Isabelle Weidemann – Long Track Speed Skating – Women's 3000m
- Mark McMorris – Snowboard – Men's Slopestyle
- Kim Boutin – Short Track Speed Skating – Women's 500m
- Mackenzie Boyd-Clowes, Alexandria Loutitt, Matthew Soukup, Abigail Strate – Ski Jumping – Mixed Team
- Maryeta O'Dine – Snowboard – Women's Snowboard Cross
- Jack Crawford – Alpine Skiing – Men's Alpine Combined
- Marion Thénault, Miha Fontaine, Lewis Fontaine, Lewis Irving – Freestyle Skiing – Mixed Team Aerials
- Eliot Grondin, Meryeta O'Dine – Snowboard – Mixed Team Snowboard Cross
- Steven Dubois – Short Track Speed Skating – Men's 500m
- Christine de Bruin – Bobsleigh – Women's Monobob
- Max Parrot – Snowboard – Men's Big Air
- Rachel Karker – Freestyle Skiing – Women's Halfpipe
- Brad Gushue, Mark Nichols, Brett Gallant, Geoff Walker, Marc Kennedy – Curling – Men's Curling
- Justin Kripps, Ryan Sommer, Cam Stones, Ben Coakwell – Bobsleigh – Four-Man

==== 1972 ====
Canada won no bronze medals at the Sapporo games

==== 1936 ====
Canada won no bronze medals at the Garmisch-Partenkirchen games

==== 1928 ====
Canada won no bronze medals at the St. Moritz games

==== 1924 ====
Canada won no bronze medals at the Chamonix games

== See also ==
- Canada at the Summer Olympics
- Canada at the Winter Olympics
