= Russell McNutt =

Russell McNutt may refer to:

- Clarence Russell McNutt (1907–1972), American Olympic canoeist
- Russell Alton McNutt (1914–2008), American engineer and alleged spy
