= Robert Graf =

Robert Graf may refer to:

- Robert Graf (actor) (1923–1966), German actor
- Robert Graf (canoeist) (1906–1988), American Olympic canoer
- Robert Graf (politician) (1929–1996), Austrian politician
