= Hans Wedemann =

German canoeist (1912–1989)

Hans Wedemann (June 25, 1912 – May 31, 1989) was a German canoeist, born in Hamburg, who competed in the 1936 Summer Olympics. In 1936, he finished fourth together with his partner Heinrich Sack in the C-2 1000 metre event.
