= Vladimír Syrovátka =

Czech canoeist and speed canoeist

Medal record

Men's flatwater canoeing

Representing Czechoslovakia

Olympic Games
Gold medal – first place	1936 Berlin	C-2 1000 m

Vladimír Syrovátka (19 June 1908, Zdolbuniv – 14 September 1973, Prague) was a Czech flatwater canoeist who competed for Czechoslovakia in the 1930s. With Jan Brzák-Felix, he won a gold medal at the 1936 Summer Olympics in the canoe double (C2) 1000 m event.
