= Canoeing at the 1936 Summer Olympics – Men's C-2 1000 metres =

These are the results of the men's C-2 1000 metres competition in canoeing at the 1936 Summer Olympics. The C-2 event is raced by two-man sprint canoes and was held on Saturday, August 8, 1936.

Ten canoeists from five nations competed.

== Medalists ==
Gold	Silver	Bronze
Jan Brzák-Felix and Vladimír Syrovátka (TCH)	Rupert Weinstabl and Karl Proisl (AUT)	Frank Saker and Harvey Charters (CAN)

== Final ==
With only five teams competing, a final was held.

Place	Canoeists	Time
1	Vladimír Syrovátka and Jan Brzák-Felix (TCH)	4:50.1
2	Rupert Weinstabl and Karl Proisl (AUT)	4:53.8
3	Frank Saker and Harvey Charters (CAN)	4:56.7
4	Hans Wedemann and Heinrich Sack (GER)	5:00.2
5	Clarence McNutt and Robert Graf (USA)	5:14.0
