= Heinrich Sack =

Heinrich Sack (10 December 1909 – 13 September 1941) was a German canoeist, born in Hamburg, who competed in the 1936 Summer Olympics.

In 1936 he finished fourth together with his partner Hans Wedemann in the C-2 1000 metre event. Sack was killed in action during World War II on the Eastern front in 1941. He is buried in a military cemetery in Kyiv.
