= Ice hockey at the 1952 Winter Olympics =

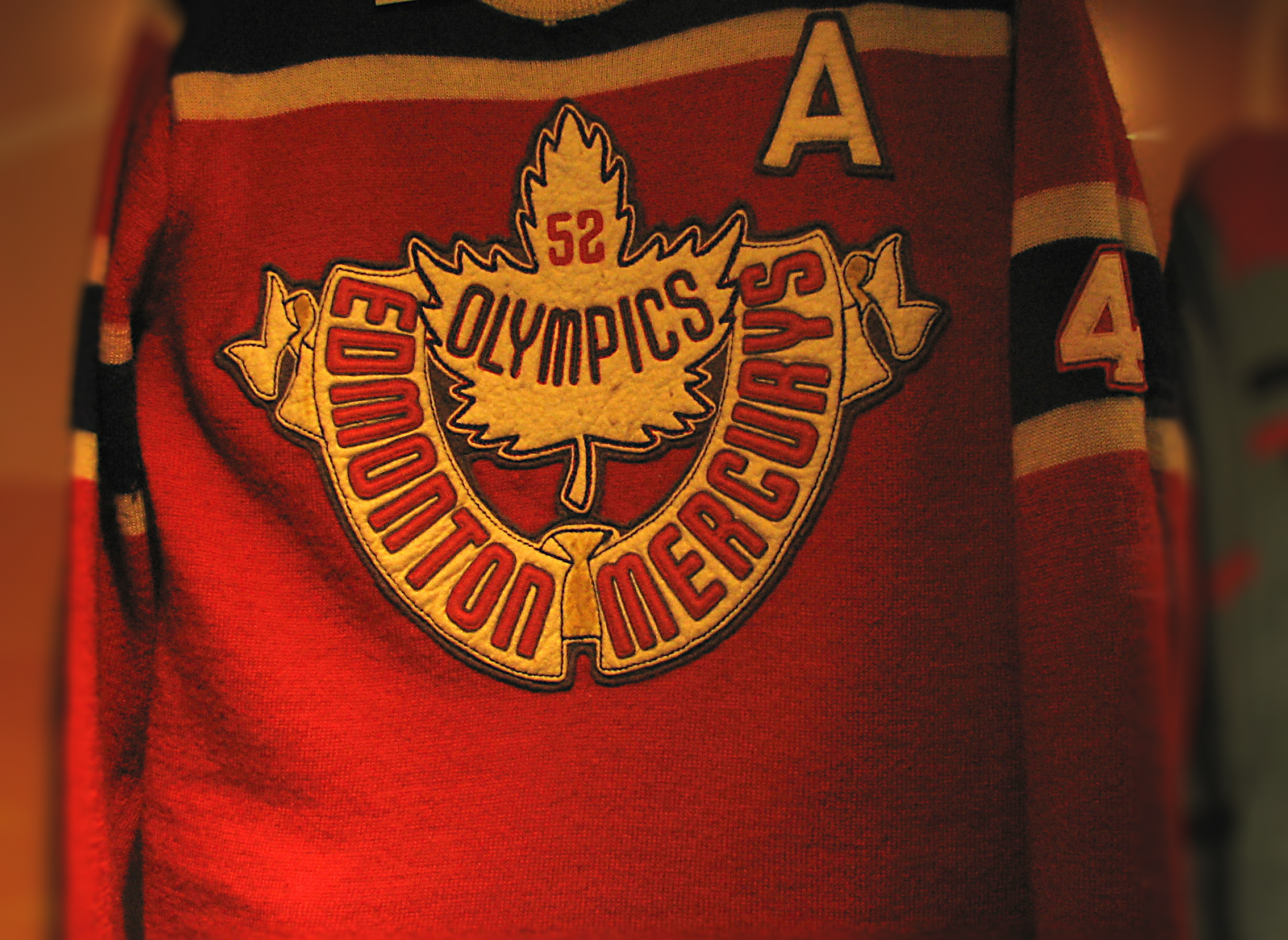
- Jersey of Canada's 1952 Olympic Gold Medal team, the Edmonton Mercurys

Tournament details
- Host country: Norway
- Venue(s): Jordal Amfi Arena, Dælenenga, Kadettangen, Marienlyst and Lillestrøm
- Dates: 15–25 February 1952
- Teams: 9

Final positions
- Champions: Canada (6th title)
- Runners-up: United States
- Third place: Sweden
- Fourth place: Czechoslovakia

Tournament statistics
- Games played: 37
- Goals scored: 335 (9.05 per game)
- Scoring leader: (Canada) Billy Gibson (19 points)

The men's ice hockey tournament at the 1952 Winter Olympics in Oslo, Norway, was the seventh Olympic Championship, also serving as the 19th World Championships and the 30th European Championships. The tournament was mainly played at the Jordal Amfi Arena, as well as the stadiums at Dælenenga (in Oslo), Kadettangen (Sandvika), Marienlyst (Drammen) and Lillestrøm (Lillestrøm). Canada, represented by the Edmonton Mercurys, won its sixth Olympic gold medal and 15th World Championship. Highest finishing European team Sweden won the bronze medal and its sixth European Championship.

The tournament was nearly not played at all. Discussions began in 1950, whether or not ice hockey would be included in the 1952 Winter Olympics. The International Olympic Committee (IOC) sought assurance that participating teams would adhere to its amateur code rather than the International Ice Hockey Federation (IIHF) code, and also wanted to exclude IIHF president Fritz Kraatz from negotiations. IIHF past-president W. G. Hardy, and secretary George Dudley agreed there would be no negotiations on those terms, nor would they repudiate Kraatz. Dudley expected the IIHF to discuss having its own 1952 Ice Hockey World Championships instead, and stated that the Olympics would be a financial failure without the inclusion of hockey. In 1951 it was decided to drop hockey from the Olympic programme because of the controversies surrounding the 1948 Games. However, at the IOC congress in Romania the same year, it was reinstated. W. G. Hardy advocated for the inclusion of the Soviet Union national ice hockey team, provided there is no political interference. Despite his advocacy the Soviet authorities did not apply in time to be included in the tournament.

Teams from Germany and Czechoslovakia rejoined the top level of international hockey this year. Nine nations played a round-robin with the top three nations receiving medals at the end. Swiss newspapers criticized the rough play by Canada and the United States team, and questioned whether hockey should be part of the Olympics. Canadian Amateur Hockey Association president Doug Grimston felt the games were tame compared to North American standards and that the Olympics would suffer without hockey which was its biggest attraction.

After Canada and the United States played to a draw in the final game of the round-robin, which placed the teams first and second respectively in the standings for the gold and silver medals. Had Canada won, the United States would have placed fourth. A newspaper in Moscow charged that a deal had been made to predetermine the outcome and assure the United States of a silver medal and to exclude the Czechoslovakia team from a medal. Canada won their sixth Olympic title, and fifteenth World title. The USA finished one point ahead of both Sweden and Czechoslovakia who both finished with six wins and two losses, additionally, they had an equal goal differential of +29. The Czechoslovaks had defeated the Swedes four to nothing on the final day, and believed that they had won the Olympic bronze, and the European Championship. However, organizers decided that they should play a final tie-breaking game, in which the Swedes overcame a three-goal deficit to win five to three.

== Qualification ==
The 1952 Olympic tournament, also the 1952 World Championship, "Category A," was open to all teams assigned by the IIHF to Category A for 1952. This was the first Olympic tournament with any type of qualification procedure.

For the purpose of maximizing fan interest and minimizing lopsided games, the IIHF announced in September 1950 a new system to separate teams into Categories A and B for the World Championships, starting in 1951. If not otherwise qualified, the Olympic host nation was guaranteed assignment to Category A for 1951 and 1952.

Teams were assigned to Category A for 1951 that

- Earned a minimum of three points at both the 1949 and 1950 World Championships.
- Earned a minimum of three points at either the 1949 or 1950 World Championships and did not play in the other.
- Did not play at the 1949 and 1950 World Championships, but were selected at IIHF discretion upon entering the 1951 World Championship.

All other teams that played at any of the World Championships from 1949 to 1951 were assigned to Category B for 1951. Because of a rule that required a team to win two consecutive Category B tournaments to earn promotion to Category A, all of these 1951 Category B teams were eliminated from Olympic qualification.

Teams were assigned to Category A for 1952 that

- Earned a minimum of two points at the 1951 World Championship, Category A.
- Earned entry into the 1951 World Championship, Category A, but did not play.
- Did not play at the 1949, 1950 or 1951 World Championships, but were selected at IIHF discretion upon entering the 1952 World Championship.

Teams were assigned to Category B for 1952 that

- Were assigned to Category B for 1951.
- Earned less than two points at the 1951 World Championship, Category A.
- Did not play at the 1949, 1950 and 1951 World Championships and were not selected for Category A at IIHF discretion upon entering the 1952 World Championship.

Great Britain qualified for the 1952 Olympic tournament according to this procedure, but announced they would not play in late 1951, and instead requested entry into the Category B tournament. They planned to enter a team composed of English players only and did not expect them to be competitive at the Olympics.

== Medalists ==
Gold	Silver	Bronze
Canada Eric Paterson; Ralph Hansch; John Davies; Don Gauf; Robert Meyers; Thomas Pollock; Al Purvis; Billy Gibson; David Miller; George Abel; Billy Dawe; Robert Dickson; Gordon Robertson; Louis Secco; Francis Sullivan; Robert Watt	United States Alfred Van Allen; André Gambucci; Arnold Oss; Clifford Harrison; Donald Whiston; Gerald Kilmartin; James Sedin; Jack Mulhern; John Noah; Joseph Czarnota; Ken Yackel; Len Ceglarski; Richard Desmond; Robert Rompre; Rube Bjorkman	Sweden Göte Almqvist; Hans Andersson-Tvilling; Stig Andersson-Tvilling; Åke Andersson; Lasse Björn; Göte Blomqvist; Thord Flodqvist; Erik Johansson; Gösta Johansson; Rune Johansson; Sven "Tumba" Johansson; Åke Lassas; Holger Nurmela; Lars Pettersson; Lars Svensson; Sven Thunman; Hans Öberg

== Participating nations ==
- Canada (16)
- Czechoslovakia (17)
- Finland (17)
- Germany (15)
- Poland (16)
- Norway (17)
- Sweden (17)
- Switzerland (17)
- United States (15)

== World Championships Group A (Norway) ==
February 15, 1952; 17:00	United States	3–2 (0–1, 2–0, 1–1)	Norway	Jordal Amfi, Oslo

February 15, 1952; 19:00	Sweden	9–2 (2–0, 5–2, 2–0)	Finland	Dæhlenenga, Oslo

February 15, 1952; 19:00	Czechoslovakia	8–2 (3–1, 2–1, 3–0)	Poland	Marienlyst, Drammen

February 15, 1952; 21:00	Canada	15–1 (6–1, 7–0, 2–0)	Germany	Jordal Amfi, Oslo

February 16, 1952; 17:00	Switzerland	12–0 (2–0, 2–0, 8–0)	Finland	Jordal Amfi, Oslo

February 16, 1952; 19:00	Czechoslovakia	6–0 (2–0, 2–0, 2–0)	Norway	Dæhlenenga, Oslo

February 16, 1952; 19:00	United States	8–2 (1–0, 3–1, 4–1)	Germany	Kadettangen, Sandvika

February 16, 1952; 21:00	Sweden	17–1 (1–0, 9–1, 7–0)	Poland	Jordal Amfi, Oslo

February 17, 1952; 17:00	Sweden	4–2 (2–1, 1–0, 1–1)	Norway	Jordal Amfi, Oslo

February 17, 1952; 19:00	Switzerland	6–3 (4–1, 2–2, 0–0)	Poland	Dæhlenenga, Oslo

February 17, 1952; 19:00	Canada	13–3 (6–2, 5–0, 2–1)	Finland	Marienlyst, Drammen

February 17, 1952; 21:00	Czechoslovakia	6–1 (0–0, 2–0, 4–1)	Germany	Jordal Amfi, Oslo

February 18, 1952; 17:00	United States	8–2 (1–0, 6–0, 1–2)	Finland	Jordal Amfi, Oslo

February 18, 1952; 19:00	Canada	11–0 (6–0, 3–0, 2–0)	Poland	Dæhlenenga, Oslo

February 18, 1952; 19:00	Switzerland	7–2 (4–0, 2–2, 1–0)	Norway	Kadettangen, Sandvika

February 18, 1952; 21:00	Sweden	7–3 (3–2, 0–0, 4–1)	Germany	Jordal Amfi, Oslo

February 19, 1952; 17:00	Canada	4–1 (1–1, 1–0, 2–0)	Czechoslovakia	Jordal Amfi, Oslo

February 19, 1952; 21:00	United States	8–2 (4–1, 3–0, 1–1)	Switzerland	Jordal Amfi, Oslo

February 20, 1952; 17:00	Poland	4–4 (1–1, 3–1, 0–2)	Germany	Jordal Amfi, Oslo

February 20, 1952; 21:00	Finland	5–2 (2–0, 2–2, 1–0)	Norway	Jordal Amfi, Oslo

February 21, 1952; 17:00	Sweden	4–2 (1–0, 0–0, 3–2)	United States	Jordal Amfi, Oslo

February 21, 1952; 19:00	Canada	11–2 (4–0, 5–0, 2–2)	Switzerland	Dæhlenenga, Oslo

February 21, 1952; 19:00	Czechoslovakia	11–2 (4–1, 3–0, 4–1)	Finland	Kadettangen, Sandvika

February 21, 1952; 21:00	Germany	6–2 (0–0, 1–1, 5–1)	Norway	Jordal Amfi, Oslo

February 22, 1952; 14:00	Finland	5–1 (1–0, 2–0, 2–1)	Germany	Jordal Amfi, Oslo

February 22, 1952; 17:00	Czechoslovakia	8–3 (0–2, 2–1, 6–0)	Switzerland	Jordal Amfi, Oslo

February 22, 1952; 19:00	United States	5–3 (1–0, 2–0, 2–3)	Poland	Dæhlenenga, Oslo

February 22, 1952; 21:00	Canada	3–2 (1–2, 1–0, 1–0)	Sweden	Jordal Amfi, Oslo

February 23, 1952; 17:00	Sweden	5–2 (1–1, 4–0, 0–1)	Switzerland	Jordal Amfi, Oslo

February 23, 1952; 19:00	Canada	11–2 (5–2, 3–0, 3–0)	Norway	Dæhlenenga, Oslo

February 23, 1952; 19:00	Poland	4–2 (2–2, 0–0, 2–1)	Finland	Lillestrøm Stadion, Lillestrøm

February 23, 1952; 21:00	United States	6–3 (2–1, 4–0, 0–2)	Czechoslovakia	Jordal Amfi, Oslo

February 24, 1952; 16:00	Switzerland	6–3 (1–1, 3–1, 2–1)	Germany	Dæhlenenga, Oslo

February 24, 1952; 17:00	Czechoslovakia	4–0 (2–0, 2–0, 0–0)	Sweden	Jordal Amfi, Oslo

February 24, 1952; 21:00	Canada	3–3 (2–0, 1–2, 0–1)	United States	Jordal Amfi, Oslo

February 25, 1952; 11:00	Poland	4–3 (1–2, 1–1, 2–0)	Norway	Jordal Amfi, Oslo

An additional game was played between Sweden and Czechoslovakia because they finished tied for a medal place on points (12) and goal difference (+29).

February 25, 1952; 17:00	Sweden	5–3 (0–2, 1–1, 4–0)	Czechoslovakia	Jordal Amfi, Oslo

== Final round ==
Team	Pld	W	L	D	GF	GA	GD	Pts
Canada	8	7	0	1	71	14	+57	15
United States	8	6	1	1	43	21	+22	13
Sweden	8	6	2	0	48	19	+29	12
Czechoslovakia	8	6	2	0	47	18	+29	12
Switzerland	8	4	4	0	40	40	0	8
Poland	8	2	5	1	21	56	−35	5
Finland	8	2	6	0	21	60	−39	4
Germany	8	1	6	1	21	53	−32	3
Norway	8	0	8	0	15	46	−31	0

Source: HockeyCanada.ca

== World Championship Group B (Belgium) ==
Played in Liege 15–22 March 1952. British manager Johnny Murray won with a roster composed entirely with English players; no Scots or Canadians.

Date	Game	Result	Periods
15 March	France vs. Netherlands	7–3	1–0, 3–1, 3–2
16 March	Belgium vs. Italy	1–3	1–0, 0–0, 0–3
16 March	Austria vs. Netherlands	5–5	1–2, 4–1, 0–2
17 March	Belgium vs. Great Britain	5–1	4–1, 0–0, 1–0
17 March	Austria vs. Italy	5–1	1–1, 0–0, 4–0
18 March	Great Britain vs. Netherlands	8–1	3–0, 3–0, 2–1
18 March	Belgium vs. France	3–3	0–2, 2–0, 1–1
19 March	Italy vs. Netherlands	5–3	1–2, 1–0, 3–1
20 March	Great Britain vs. France	10–0	4–0, 5–0, 1–0
20 March	Belgium vs. Austria	7–10	2–2, 2–6, 3–2
21 March	Italy vs. France	14–5	4–1, 5–1, 5–3
21 March	Great Britain vs. Austria	2–1	0–0, 2–1, 0–0
22 March	Austria vs. France	11–4	3–0, 0–4, 8–0
22 March	Great Britain vs. Italy	7–3	2–1, 1–1, 3–1
22 March	Belgium vs. Netherlands	1–7	1–3, 0–3, 0–1

=== Table ===
Pos	Team	Pld	W	L	D	GF	GA	GD	Pts
10	Great Britain	5	4	1	0	28	10	+18	8
11	Austria	5	3	1	1	32	19	+13	7
12	Italy	5	3	2	0	26	21	+5	6
13	Netherlands	5	1	3	1	19	26	−7	3
14	Belgium	5	1	3	1	17	24	−7	3
15	France	5	1	3	1	19	41	−22	3

Source: HockeyCanada.ca

== Statistics ==
=== Average age ===
Team Germany was the oldest team in the tournament, averaging 27 years and 10 months. Team Norway was the youngest team in the tournament, averaging 23 years and 9 months. Gold medalists Team Canada averaged 26 years and 5 months. Tournament average was 25 years and 8 months.

=== Top scorers ===
Team	GP	G	A	Pts
(Canada) Billy Gibson	8	12	7	19

== European Championship medal table ==
1st place, gold medalist(s)	Sweden
2nd place, silver medalist(s)	Czechoslovakia
3rd place, bronze medalist(s)	Switzerland
4	Poland
5	Finland
6	Germany
7	Norway
