= Robert Richardson (alpine skier) =

Canadian alpine skier (1927–2004)

Robert Richardson (21 December 1927 – 12 April 2004) was a Canadian alpine skier who competed in the 1952 Winter Olympics.
