= Hans Andersson-Tvilling =

Swedish ice hockey player and footballer (1928–2026)

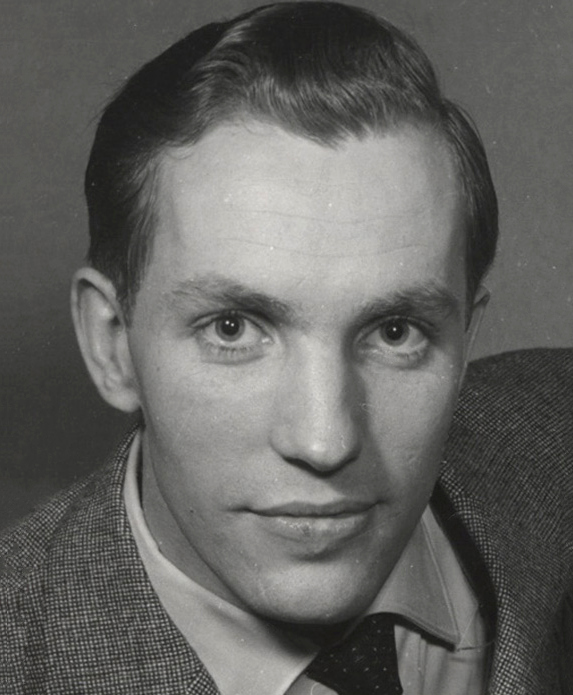
- Andersson-Tvilling in the 1950s
- Born: Hans Lennart Andersson; 15 July 1928; Stockholm, Sweden
- Died: 16 September 2026 (aged 98)
Ice hockey career
- Played for: Djurgårdens IF
- Playing career: 1947–1961
Association football career
- Position: Forward
Youth career
- Komet
Senior career*
Years	Team	Apps	(Gls)
–1947	IF Ulvarna		
1947–1957	Djurgårdens IF		
1957–1959	Sundbybergs IK		
1959–1960	Djurgårdens IF		
1961–1962	Nyköpings AIK		
1963	BK Vargarna		
1964	Nyköpings AIK		
1964	BK Vargarna		
International career
1951–1953	Sweden	4	(0)
Medal record
Representing Sweden
Olympic Games
Bronze medal – third place	1952 Oslo	Team
World Championships
Silver medal – second place	Paris 1951	Team
Gold medal – first place	Zürich/Basel 1953	Team
Bronze medal – third place	Stockholm 1954	Team
- * Club domestic league appearances and goals

Hans Lennart Andersson-Tvilling (15 July 1928 – 16 September 2026) was a Swedish ice hockey player and footballer. He competed at the 1952 and 1956 Winter Olympics, winning a bronze medal in 1952 and finishing fourth in 1956 alongside his twin brother Stig. In addition to hockey, he also played four international matches for the Swedish team. Andersson-Tvilling died on 16 September 2026, at the age of 98.

== Honours ==
Djurgårdens IF

- Division 2 Nordöstra: 1948–49
- Allsvenskan: 1954–55
