= Gerald Kilmartin =

American ice hockey player

Personal information
- Born: July 7, 1927 Providence, Rhode Island, United States
- Died: June 16, 1970 (aged 42)
Medal record
Men's Ice Hockey
Silver medal – second place	1952 Oslo	Team

Gerald Walsh "Gerry" Kilmartin (July 7, 1927 – June 16, 1970) was an American ice hockey player. He won a silver medal at the 1952 Winter Olympics.

Kilmartin was born in Providence, Rhode Island. Kilmartin attended Bryant College (now Bryant University) where he played on the hockey team. He never played professionally but instead was with several amateur clubs in the Boston area. In addition to playing at the 1952 Olympics he was on the U.S. National team which competed at the 1947 and 1949 World Championships. He later became a salesman which led to the establishment of his own company, International Packaging, in Providence. In 1970, he was assaulted at a marina in Newport. Two days later, Kilmartin died of the injuries sustained in the attack.
