= Åke Andersson (ice hockey) =

Swedish ice hockey player

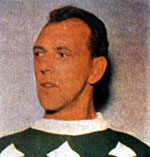
- Andersson in 1948
- Born: 8 June 1918; Stockholm, Sweden
- Died: 11 May 1982 (aged 63); Södertälje, Sweden
Ice hockey career
- Position: Defenceman, forward
- Played for: Hammarby IF
- National team: Sweden
- Playing career: 1934–1958
Medal record
Representing Sweden
Olympic Games
| Bronze medal – third place | 1952 Oslo | Team |
World Championships
| Silver medal – second place | Prague 1947 | Team |
| Silver medal – second place | Paris 1951 | Team |
| Gold medal – first place | Zürich/Basel 1953 | Team |
| Bronze medal – third place | Stockholm 1954 | Team |
Association football career
- Position: Midfielder
Youth career
- Hammarby IF
Senior career*
| Years | Team | Apps | (Gls) |
| 1937–1951 | Hammarby IF | 231 | (40) |
Managerial career
- 1951: Hammarby IF
- * Club domestic league appearances and goals
Bandy career
- Playing position: Midfielder
Senior career*
| Years | Team | Apps^{†} | (Gls)^{†} |
| 1934–1958 | Hammarby IF | | |
- * Senior club appearances and goals counted for the domestic league only. † Appearances (Goals).

Åke Gustav "Plutten" Andersson (8 June 1918 – 11 May 1982) was a Swedish ice hockey, football and bandy player and manager, known for representing Hammarby IF in all three sports.

He represented his country at two Winter Olympic games, finishing fourth in 1948 and winning a bronze medal in 1952. He was the captain of the Sweden national team from 1945 until his retirement in 1954.

== Early life ==
Andersson grew up in a working-class home in a southern part of Stockholm known as Södermalm. His father was working as a groundskeeper at Hammarby Idrottsplats, the home of local club Hammarby IF which he joined at age 14.

== Athletic career ==
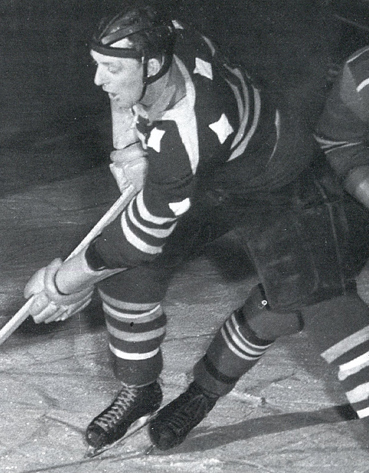
Andersson was the club captain for Hammarby IF.

=== Ice hockey ===
In 1934, Andersson started to play hockey with Hammarby IF in Elitserien, Sweden's top tier.

He won six Swedish championships – in 1936, 1937, 1942, 1943, 1946 and 1951 – with the club. In total, Andersson made 351 competitive appearances for Hammarby, scoring 150 goals. He played 23 seasons in the Swedish top league, a domestic record.

He was known as a hard-working player with an abundancy of stamina, possessing a tactical mind and a sense of play. He was also known for positioning himself and had positive offensive qualities. Andersson was, among other awards and prizes, crowned as "Sweden's best hockey player" seven consecutive years. Andersson formed a strong defensive pairing with the physical defenseman Rune Johansson for several seasons.

Andersson decided to stay with Hammarby during his whole career, even though he had frequent offers from other teams in Sweden. About his love for Hammarby, Andersson said the following in November 1957:

A club that has done so much for me, given me so much joy, I would never be able to disappoint. I would have felt like a criminal if I had done that.

He won 62 competitive caps for the Sweden national team, scoring a total of 18 goals, and regularly captained the side. Andersson represented his country at six major tournaments, and his biggest achievements were winning the bronze medal in the 1952 Winter Olympics and Sweden's first ever World Championship win in 1953.

He is a recipient of the honorary award Stora Grabbars Märke and was inducted into the Swedish Hockey Hall of Fame in 2012; both awards are handed out by the Swedish Ice Hockey Association. In total, he made 134 appearances for Sweden, including friendlies and exhibition matches, between 1937 and 1954.

Andersson retired from hockey at the end of 1958, at age 40, due to a fracture. He was the head coach of Hammarby between 1960 and 1962.

=== Football ===
In 1937, at age 19, Andersson debuted in the senior football team of Hammarby IF. Up until 1951, Andersson made 231 league appearances for Hammarby, mostly in the Swedish second tier Division 2, scoring 40 goals, playing as a midfielder.

In 1939–40, Hammarby competed for one season in Allsvenskan, the domestic top league, with Andersson playing 13 of 22 fixtures, but was relegated immediately.

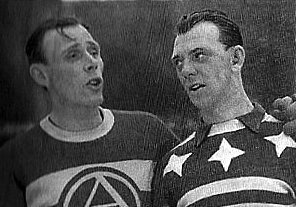
Åke Andersson (right) with his brother Stig Emanuel Andersson (left), who played in different teams in 1949, Hammarby IF and Atlas Diesels IF.

He was the player-manager of Hammarby for one season in 1950–51 together with Folke Adamsson, after which he decided to retire from football.

=== Bandy ===
Andersson was also a prominent bandy player for Hammarby IF between 1932 and 1947. He was a member of the Sweden national team and won a total of seven caps for his country. As well as in ice hockey, Andersson is a recipient of the honorary award Stora Grabbars Märke in bandy, an award that is handed out by the Swedish Bandy Association.

== Personal life ==
He was the younger brother of Stig Emanuel Andersson, who also was a celebrated sportsman. His nephew Börje Andersson also played hockey and made one season with Hammarby IF in 1968–69.
