= Clarence McNutt =

American canoeist (1907–1972)

Clarence Russell McNutt (November 9, 1907 – February 2, 1972) was an American canoeist who competed in the 1936 Summer Olympics.

He was born in Philadelphia.

In 1936 he finished fifth together with his partner Robert Graf in the C-2 1000 metre event.
