= Stig Andersson-Tvilling =

Swedish ice hockey player (1928–1989)

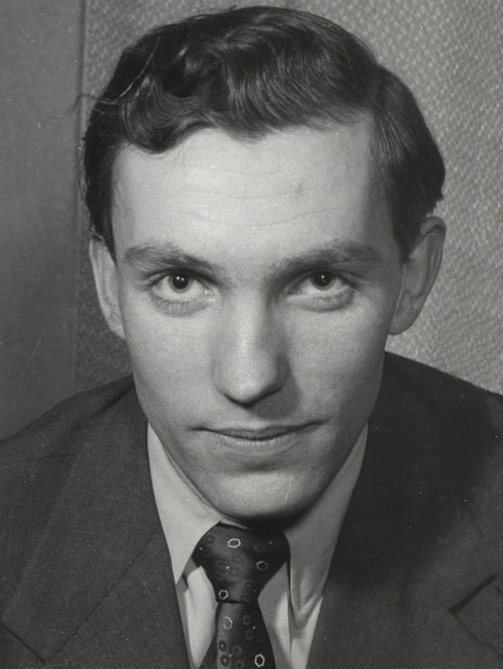
- Stig Andersson-Tvilling in the 1950's
- Born: Stig Gunnar Andersson; 15 July 1928; Stockholm, Sweden
- Died: 20 September 1989 (aged 61); Stockholm, Sweden
Ice hockey career
- Played for: Djurgårdens IF
- Playing career: 1947–1961
Association football career
- Positions: Halfback; inside forward
Youth career
- Komet
Senior career*
Years	Team	Apps	(Gls)
–1947	IF Ulvarna		
1947–1957	Djurgårdens IF		
1957–1960	Sundbybergs IK		
1961–1962	Nyköpings AIK		
1962–1963	BK Vargarna		
1964	Nyköpings AIK		
- Övergrans IF
International career
1951	Sweden	1	(0)
Medal record
Representing Sweden
Bronze medal – third place	1952 Oslo	Team
World Championships
Silver medal – second place	Paris 1951	Team
Gold medal – first place	Zürich/Basel 1953	Team
Bronze medal – third place	Stockholm 1954	Team
Olympic Games
- * Club domestic league appearances and goals

Stig Gunnar Andersson-Tvilling (15 July 1928 — 20 September 1989) was a Swedish ice hockey player. He competed at the 1952 and 1956 Winter Olympics, winning a bronze medal in 1952 and finishing fourth in 1956 alongside his twin brother Hans. Besides hockey he also played one international match for the Swedish association football team.
