= Harvey Charters =

Canadian canoeist

Olympic medal record

Men's flatwater canoeing
Silver medal – second place	1936 Berlin	C-2 10000 m
Bronze medal – third place	1936 Berlin	C-2 1000 m

Harvey Blashford Charters (born May 8, 1912, in North Bay, Ontario, Canada - died July 17, 1995, in North Bay, Ontario, Canada) was a Canadian flatwater canoeist who competed in the 1930s.

At the 1936 Summer Olympics in Berlin, he won two medals with Frank Saker with a silver in the C-2 10000 m and a bronze in the C-2 1000 m events
