= Robert Rompre =

American ice hockey player

Medal record

Representing United States

Men's Ice Hockey
| Silver medal – second place | 1952 Oslo | Team |

Robert Edward Rompre (April 11, 1929 – September 13, 2010) was an American ice hockey player who won a silver medal with the United States men's national ice hockey team at the 1952 Winter Olympics in Oslo, Norway.

He was born on April 11, 1929, in International Falls, Minnesota to Elmer and Martha Rompre. He had been offered an athletic scholarship by Colorado College but was drafted by the United States Marine Corps. He would have served in the Korean War, though the Marines allowed him to play hockey when he made the 1952 U.S. Olympic team.

In a game played outdoors under steady snowfall on February 18, 1952, Rompre scored four goals in an 8–2 American victory over the Finnish team, scoring three goals in the second period and another goal in the third period. Two of the goals Rompre scored were tallied in a ten-second span in the second period. After completing his military service he was offered the opportunity to play for the New York Rangers, but turned down the opportunity to play in the National Hockey League in order to finish college. He played minor league hockey with the Oakland Knaves and Los Angeles Cardinals of the Pacific Coast Hockey League during the 1952–53 season before returning to Colorado College, from which he graduated in 1956.

He settled in Waupun, Wisconsin, where he played for the Fond du Lac Bears. He led the team to two state championship's and led the team in goals scored. After his playing career ended he coached the team until 1975, after which the team retired his number 8 jersey. He served as a scout for the U.S. men's national ice hockey team and helped establish hockey halls of fame in both Minnesota and Wisconsin, and was later inducted into both. He was recognized by the United States Hockey Association with its William Thayer Tutt award for his service to the sport.

Rompre died at age 81 on September 13, 2010, at his son's home in Sun Prairie, Wisconsin. He was survived by a daughter, two sons, 13 grandchildren and 12 great-grandchildren.
