= Rosemarie Schutz =

Canadian alpine skier (born 1930)

Personal information
- Born: 15 November 1930 (age 94) Montreal, Quebec, Canada

Sport
- Country: Canada
- Sport: Alpine skiing

Rosemarie Schutz (born 15 November 1930) is a Canadian former alpine skier who competed in the 1952 Winter Olympics.
