= Rune Johansson =

Swedish ice hockey player

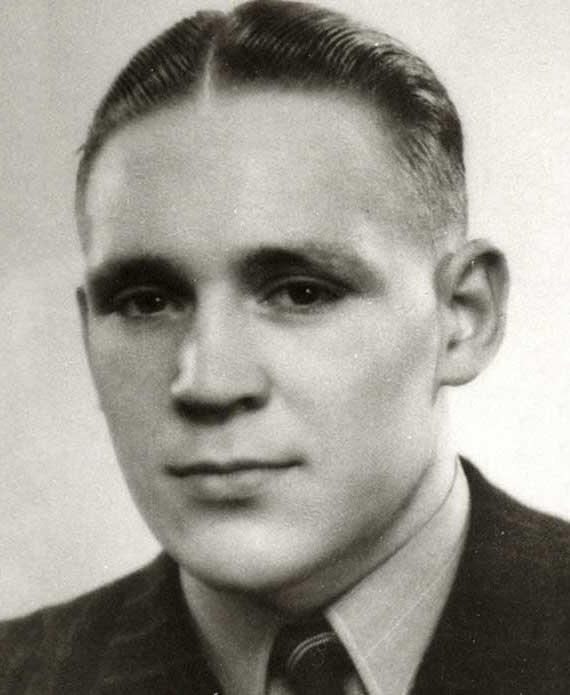
- Johansson in 1950.
- Born: 23 August 1920 Stockholm, Sweden
- Died: 30 December 1998 (aged 78) Stockholm, Sweden
- Position: Defenceman
- Played for: AIK; Hammarby IF
- National team: Sweden
- Playing career: 1940–1955
Medal record
Representing Sweden
Olympic Games
Bronze medal – third place	1952 Oslo	Team
World Championships
Silver medal – second place	1947 Prague	Team
Silver medal – second place	1951 Paris	Team
Gold medal – first place	1953 Zürich/Basel	Team

Rune Arnold Georg Johansson (23 August 1920 – 30 December 1998) was a Swedish ice hockey player, best known for representing Hammarby IF. He played 103 international games for Sweden and won the 1953 World Championships, as well as competing in the 1948 and 1952 Winter Olympics.

== Club career ==
Born and raised in Stockholm, Johansson started to play ice hockey with local clubs BK Nordia and IK Sture as a youngster. In 1940, he made his debut in the senior roster of AIK IF, competing in Svenska Serien. He played five seasons with the club in the domestic top division.

In 1945, Johansson joined rivals Hammarby IF. Known as a physical and reliable stay-at-home defenceman, he formed a strong defensive pairing with club legend Åke Andersson for several seasons. He won the Swedish championship with the club in 1951.

He stayed with Hammarby IF for 10 seasons, before retiring in 1955. In total, Johansson played 132 games for the club and scored 39 goals.

== International career ==
Johansson made 103 international appearances for the Swedish national team, making his debut in 1941.

Competing in five World Championships, Johansson most notably won the gold medal in 1953. He also won the silver medal with his country in 1947 and 1951.

Johansson competed in the 1948 Winter Olympics in St. Moritz where Sweden placed fourth, and won the bronze medal with his country at the 1952 Winter Olympics in Oslo.

He is a recipient of the honorary award Stora Grabbars Märke, handed out by the Swedish Ice Hockey Association.

== Coaching career ==
After retiring, Johansson worked as an ice hockey coach for Hammarby IF and as a sports administrator with local club Nordia HC, based in the Stockholm suburb of Bagarmossen.

== Other sports ==
He was also talented in athletics, competing in hammer throw at the highest domestic level and winning the Stockholm district championships. Like many other ice hockey players at the time, Johansson also played bandy with Hammarby IF. He was listed as a reserve player for the club in 1945 and 1946.
