= Craig Mackay =

Canadian speed skater (1927–2020)

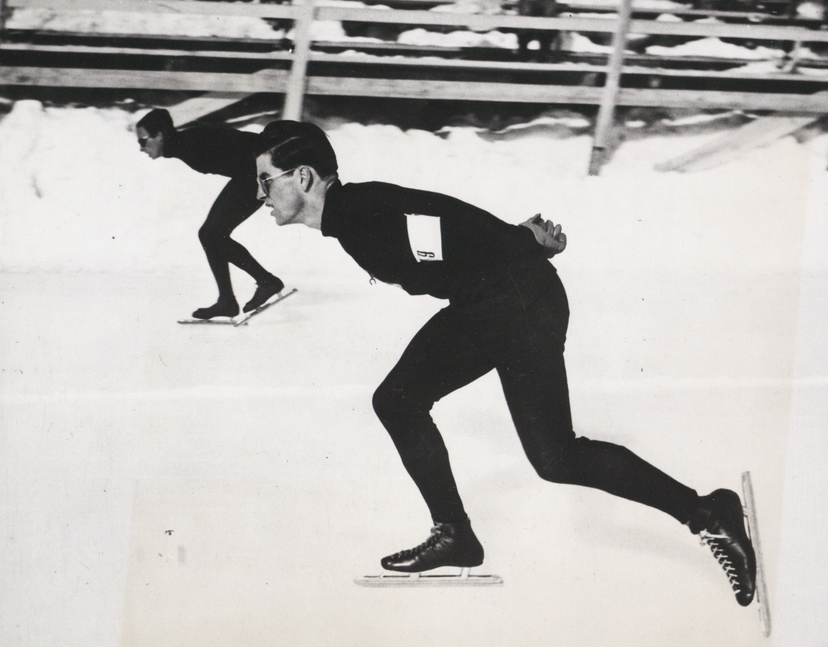

Personal information
- Full name: Craig Innis Mackay
- Born: April 1, 1927 Banff, Alberta, Canada
- Died: February 28, 2020 (aged 92)
- Years active: 1943–1960s

Sport
- Country: Canada
- Sport: Speed skating
- Club: Saskatoon Speed Skating Club

Craig Innis Mackay (April 1, 1927 – February 28, 2020) was a Canadian speed skater who competed at the 1948 Winter Olympics and 1952 Winter Olympics. He was born in Banff, Alberta and raised in Saskatoon, Saskatchewan, where he moved when he was three years old. He was a member of the Saskatchewan Sports Hall of Fame and Saskatoon Sports Hall of Fame.
