= Frank Saker =

Canadian flatwater canoeist

Medal record

Men's flatwater canoeing

Representing Canada

Olympic Games
Silver medal – second place	1936 Berlin	C-2 10000 m
Bronze medal – third place	1936 Berlin	C-2 1000 m

Frank Warren Saker (August 10, 1907 in Toronto – April 6, 1980) was a Canadian flatwater canoeist who competed in the 1930s.

At the 1936 Summer Olympics in Berlin, he won two medals with Harvey Charters with a silver in the C-2 10000 m and a bronze in the C-2 1000 m events.
