= Jacques Carbonneau =

Canadian cross-country skier

Jacques Carbonneau (May 11, 1928 – March 13, 2007) was a Canadian cross-country skier who competed in the 1950s. He finished 70th in the 18 km event at the 1952 Winter Olympics in Oslo.
