= Andy Gambucci =

American ice hockey player

Personal information
- Full name: Andre Peter Gambucci
- Born: November 12, 1928 Eveleth, Minnesota, U.S.
- Died: September 24, 2016 (aged 87) Colorado Springs, Colorado, U.S.
Medal record
Men's ice hockey
Representing the United States
Olympic Games
Silver medal – second place	1952 Oslo	Team

Andre Peter "Andy" Gambucci (November 12, 1928 – September 24, 2016) was an American ice hockey player. He won a silver medal at the 1952 Winter Olympics. He was born in Eveleth, Minnesota, and attended Colorado College.

Gambucci died on September 24, 2016, at the age 87 due to complications from congestive heart failure.
