= Edmonton Mercurys =

Canadian senior ice hockey team (1940s–1950s)

Medal record

Representing Canada

Men's ice hockey

Olympic Games/World Championship
| Gold medal – first place | 1952 Oslo | Team |

World Championship
| Gold medal – first place | 1950 London | Team |

The Edmonton Mercurys were a Canadian intermediate-level senior ice hockey team based in Edmonton, Alberta, during the 1940s and 1950s. The team represented the Canada men's national ice hockey team twice, winning the 1950 World Ice Hockey Championships in London and the 1952 Winter Olympics Gold Medal in Oslo.

== History ==
The Mercurys formed in 1949, and were named for the Mercury automobile sold by Danish-born dealer James A. Christiansen, who established and sponsored the team. A number of the players were employees of the dealership, Waterloo Mercury. In January 1950 the Mercurys, who had won the Western Intermediate League championships, played a round of exhibition games in Scotland.

=== 1950 World Championships ===
In August 1949, Canadian Amateur Hockey Association (CAHA) president Al Pickard announced that the Mercurys would represent Canada at the 1950 Ice Hockey World Championships in England. He conceded that Edmonton was not the strongest choice since it played at the intermediate level of senior hockey, but amateur requirements made it difficult to send a top flight team to the Ice Hockey World Championships. The CAHA scheduled a three-month European tour for the team and committed to finding the best available players as reinforcements. The Mercurys won all five games played at the 1950 World Championships in London, and outscored their opponents by 42 goals to 3 to become World Champions.

1950 World Championships roster

- Coach: Jimmy Graham
- Players: Harry Allen, Marsh Darling, Bob David, John Davies, Billie Dawe, Wilbert Delainey, Donald Gauf, Jimmy Kilburn, Leo Lucchini, Jack Manson, Doug MacAuley, Ab Newsome, Al Purvis, Don Stanley, Bob Watt, Pete Wright, Hassie Young

=== 1952 Winter Olympics ===
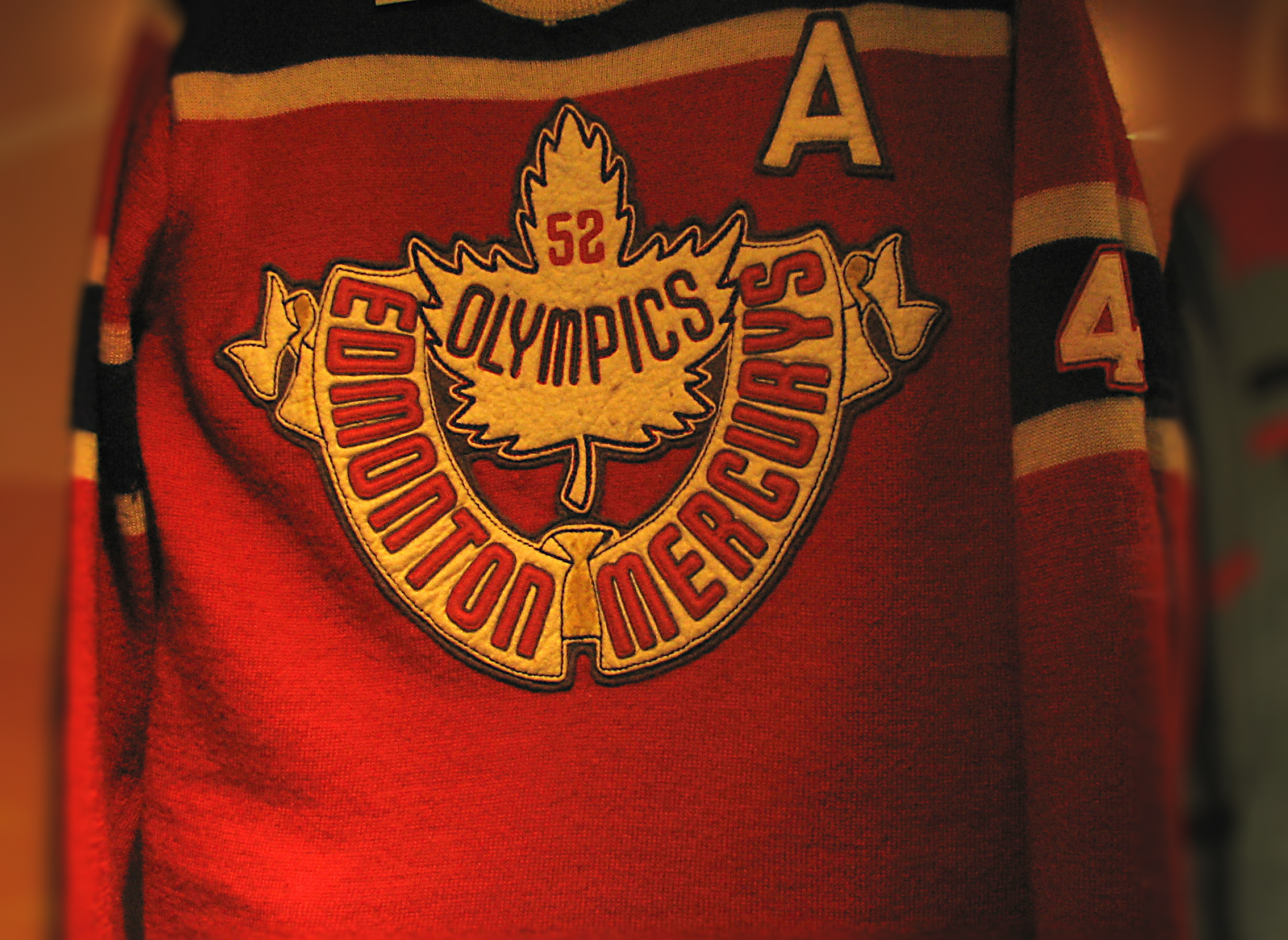
1952 Olympic jersey of the Edmonton Mercurys

In July 1951, CAHA president Doug Grimston announced that the Mercurys were chosen to represent Canada in ice hockey at the 1952 Winter Olympics in Oslo. Swiss newspapers criticized the rough play by Canada and the United States team, and questioned whether hockey should be part of the Olympics. Grimston felt the games were tame compared to North American standards and that the Olympics would suffer without hockey which was its biggest attraction. Canada and the United States played to a 3–3 draw in the final game of the round-robin, which placed the teams first and second respectively in the standings for the gold and silver medals. Had Canada won, the United States would have placed fourth.

The ice hockey tournament at the 1952 Winter Olympics also doubled as that year's World Championships, the second world title won by the Mercurys. The 1952 gold medal by the Mercurys was not repeated by a Canadian team until the 2002 Winter Olympics.

1952 Winter Olympics roster

- Coach: Louis Holmes
- Players: George Abel, John Davies, Billie Dawe, Bruce Dickson, Donald Gauf, William Gibson, Ralph Hansch, Robert Meyers, David Miller, Eric Paterson, Thomas Pollock, Al Purvis, Gordon Robertson, Louis Secco, Francis Sullivan, and Bob Watt

=== 1952 European tour ===
The CAHA booked European tours and accommodations for the national team through British travel agent Bunny Ahearne, who at the time was also the secretary of the British Ice Hockey Association and vice-president of the International Ice Hockey Federation. Grimston and Ahearne had a physical altercation in an Oslo hotel lobby on February 25, 1952, which was not publicized until two weeks later. Grimston stated that the perceived exploitation of the Edmonton Mercurys on their European tour by Ahearne led to the altercation, and that the players were given only five pounds per week for expenses, which he felt was "hardly enough to pay their laundry and some postage stamps".

The Edmonton Mercurys continued playing after "heated discussions" in which the team threatened to shorten the tour and accused Ahearne of "siphoning profits" beyond his 10 per cent cut. When the hockey tournament at the 1952 Winter Olympics ended on February 25, the Mercurys subsequently played in and won the inaugural Ahearne Cup tournament in Stockholm, played from February 27 to March 2. The Mercurys played three games and defeated the Stockholm Lions by a 12–2 score, the United States national team by a 7–1 score, and the Sweden national team by a 4–1 score.

== Hall of Fame recognition ==
The 1950 World Champion version of the Edmonton Mercurys team was inducted to the Alberta Sports Hall of Fame in 2011.

The 1952 Olympic and World Champion Edmonton Mercurys team was inducted to the Alberta Sports Hall of Fame in 1968, and was inducted to the Canadian Olympic Hall of Fame in 2002.

== See also ==
- List of Canadian national ice hockey team rosters
- List of ice hockey teams in Alberta

| Preceded by Ottawa RCAF Flyers | Canada men's Olympic ice hockey team 1952 | Succeeded by Kitchener-Waterloo Dutchmen |
