= Robert Graf (canoeist) =

American canoeist

Robert J. Graf (June 2, 1906 - May 26, 1988) was an American canoeist who competed in the 1936 Summer Olympics.

He was born in Philadelphia.

In 1936, he finished fifth together with his partner Clarence McNutt in the C-2 1000 metre event.
