= Joanne Hewson =

Canadian alpine skier (1930–2023)

Personal information
- Born: Joanne Selden Hewson; 23 August 1930 Montreal, Quebec, Canada
- Died: 1 December 2023 (aged 93) Westmount, Quebec, Canada

Sport
- Country: Canada
- Sport: Alpine skiing

Achievements and titles
- Olympic finals: 1 (1952)

Joanne Selden Hewson-Rees (23 August 1930 – 1 December 2023) was a Canadian alpine skier who competed in the 1952 Winter Olympics. She placed 8th in the downhill event, 13th in the slalom, and 30th in the giant slalom.

Hewson died in Westmount, Quebec on 1 December 2023, at the age of 93.
