= Joseph Czarnota =

American ice hockey player

Medal record

Men's Ice Hockey
Silver medal – second place	1952 Oslo	Team

Joseph John Czarnota (March 25, 1925 – October 9, 1968) was an American ice hockey player. He won a silver medal at the 1952 Winter Olympics in Oslo, Norway. After Czarnota graduated from high school he enlisted in the military and fought in World War II with the Marines. When he finished serving, he started school at Boston University playing hockey and worked his way to the Olympics.
