= John Noah =

American ice hockey player

- Born: November 21, 1927 Crookston, Minnesota, U.S.
- Died: September 3, 2015 (aged 87) Fargo, North Dakota, U.S.
- Position: Defense
- Shot: Right
- Played for: Fighting Sioux
- National team: United States
- Playing career: 1947–1952
Medal record
Men's ice hockey
Representing the United States
Olympic Games
Silver medal – second place	1952 Oslo	Team

John Michael Noah (November 21, 1927 – September 3, 2015) was an American ice hockey player. He won a silver medal at the 1952 Winter Olympics.

Noah, originally from Crookston, Minnesota, played at UND from 1947 through 1951 and earned All-America honors on defense as a senior in 1950–51. He finished his collegiate career with 29 goals and 44 assists for 73 points in 67 games.

== 1952 Winter Olympics ==
Noah went on to become UND's first men's hockey Olympian in 1952 when he represented the United States at the Winter Games in Oslo, Norway. Noah helped the US win a silver medal in the 1952 Winter Olympics

== UND Hockey Program ==
"He started the program in its infancy stages, built it from the ground up, and paved the way for the program to build it what it is today," UND men's hockey coach Brad Berry told the Fargo Forum. "He always had a smile on his face. His fondest memories came from UND hockey, and he told everyone that. He'll be sadly missed."

== Career statistics ==
Regular season and playoffs
			Regular season					Playoffs
Season	Team	League	GP	G	A	Pts	PIM	GP	G	A	Pts	PIM
1947–48	U. of North Dakota	NCAA	16	13	3	16	6	-	-	-	-	-
1948–49	U. of North Dakota	NCAA	22	3	9	12	10	—	—	—	—	—
1949–50	U. of North Dakota	NCAA	23	9	20	29	24	—	—	—	—	—
1950–51	U. of North Dakota	NCAA	26	4	12	16	10	—	—	—	—	—
1951-52	Team USA	OG	8	0	2	2	8	—	—	—	—	—

== Hall of Fame ==
Noah was inducted into the UND Athletics Hall of Fame in 1976. He was UND's first hockey All-American player in 1951. Lettered all four years of his college career as a defenseman. During this time, John Noah was also a member of the United States National Hockey Team, competing in the 1950 World Tournament and performing very well.

The University of North Dakota Letterwinners Hall of Fame recognizes the efforts and achievements of former UND student-athletes, coaches, and other supporters of UND athletics. Inductees are selected by the UND Letterwinners Association and representatives of the UND athletic department. The Hall of Fame induction ceremony, sponsored by the UND Letterwinners Association, is held each fall in conjunction with a football game. The Hall of Fame is located on the upper concourse at the south end of the Ralph Engelstad Arena.

== Awards and honors ==
Award	Year
AHCA First Team All-American	1950–51
UND Hall of Fame Inductee	1976
