= John Griffin (alpine skier) =

Canadian alpine skier (1930–2005)

John Griffin (3 January 1930 – 12 December 2005) was a Canadian alpine skier who competed in the 1952 Winter Olympics.
