= Allen Van =

American ice hockey player

Olympic medal record

Representing United States

Men's Ice Hockey
Silver medal – second place	1952 Oslo	Team

Allen Alfred Van (March 30, 1915 – August 27, 1995) was an American ice hockey player who competed in the 1952 Winter Olympics. He was a member of the American national team that won the silver medal in Oslo.
