= Billie Dawe =

Canadian ice hockey player

- Born: June 8, 1924 Cochrane, Alberta, Canada
- Died: May 20, 2013 (aged 88) Edmonton, Alberta, Canada
- Position: Left Wing
- Shot: Left
- Played for: Edmonton Mercurys
- National team: Canada
- Playing career: 1949–1952
Medal record
Men's ice hockey
Olympic Games
Gold medal – first place	1952 Oslo	Ice hockey
World Championship
Gold medal – first place	1950 London	Ice hockey

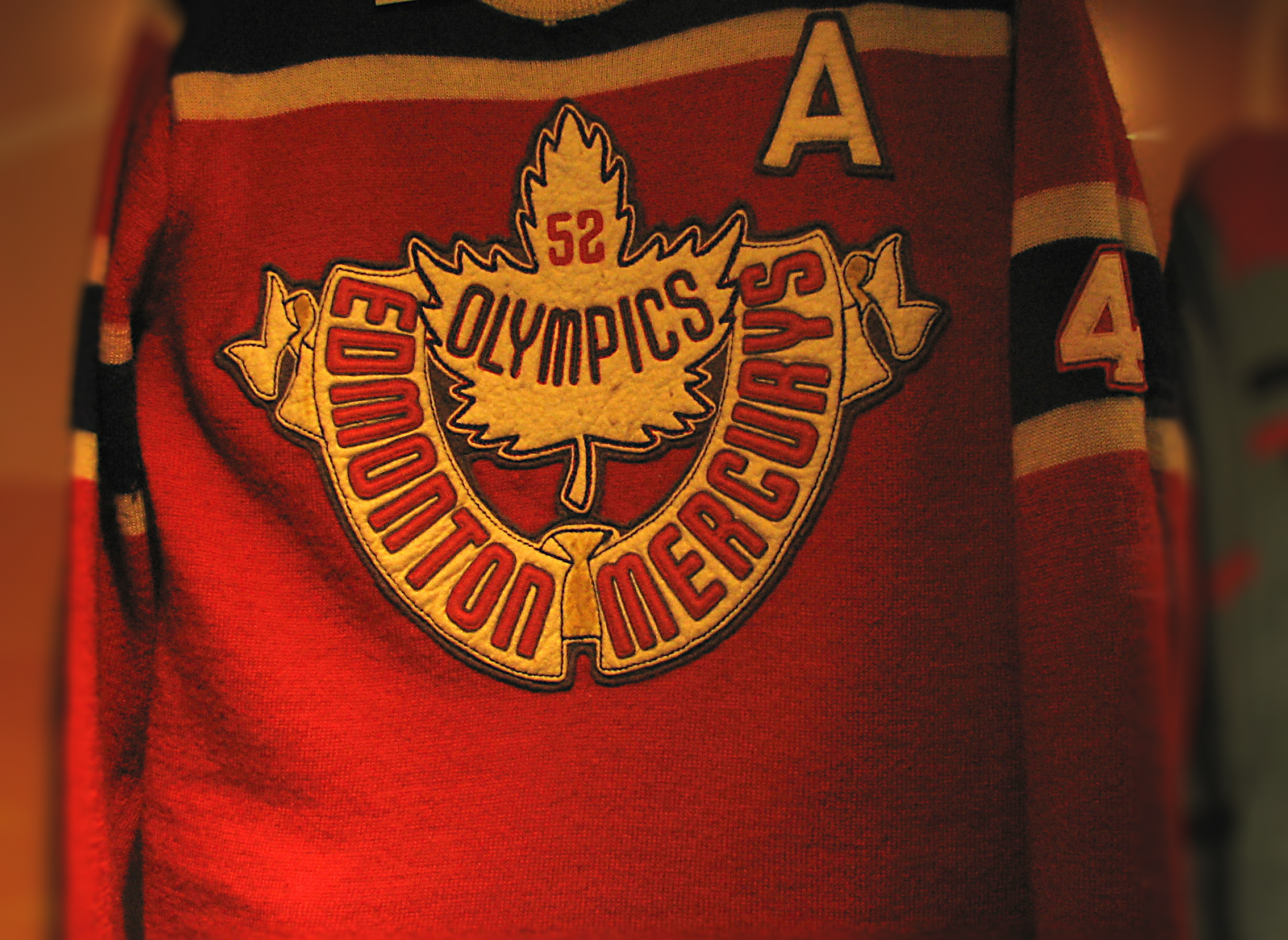
The 1952 Olympics jersey of the Edmonton Mercurys

Billie Dawe (June 8, 1924 – May 20, 2013) was a Canadian amateur ice hockey player. He was a member of the 1950 World Champion team, the Edmonton Mercurys (the Mercs), and captained that team to a gold medal at the 1952 Winter Olympics.

== Early life ==
Dawe was born in Cochrane, Alberta, but lived most of his life in Edmonton. His mother, Hilda, was a British war bride of his father, Bill, who met her while he was serving in the Canadian Expeditionary Force during World War I. The hockey-playing Dawe would meet his wife, Lee, in Manitoba, Canada, while training to be a pilot for the Royal Canadian Air Force at RCAF Station Gimli during World War II.

== Career ==
In 1949, Dawe joined the Edmonton Mercurys, a newly formed intermediate senior-A ice hockey team in Edmonton, Alberta. Dawe played with the Mercurys when they took part in exhibition games in Ayr, Scotland in 1950, and later helped them to win the 1950 World Ice Hockey Championships in London, England.

Two years later, Dawe was team captain when the Mercs won the gold medal at the 1952 Winter Olympics/1952 World Championship in Oslo, Norway. Dawe tied for second in team scoring, with 6 goals and 6 assists during 8 games, as the Mercurys outscored their opponents 71-14 en route to the gold medal.

Dawe retired from hockey following the 1952 Olympics, going to work at the Edmonton Waterloo Mercury car dealership, sponsor of the Edmonton Mercurys hockey team, for many decades. Dawe became parts manager at the dealership and a partner in the firm, along with four other Mercurys teammate, including eventual principal owner Al Purvis. He continued to be involved in sports, serving as president of the Canadian Athletic Club, coaching Little League baseball, and participating in curling.

Canada did not win the ice hockey Olympic gold medal again for 50 years following the win by the Mercurys. Dawe and a number of the surviving Mercury players were invited to Salt Lake City in 2002 to watch – then help Team Canada celebrate – their next gold medal win.

Dawe, as part of the 1952 Olympic/World Champion Edmonton Mercurys, was inducted to the Alberta Sports Hall of Fame in 1968. The 1952 Mercurys, including Dawe, was inducted to the Canadian Olympic Hall of Fame in 2002 - the same year that Team Canada finally broke its 50-year gold medal drought. Dawe, as part of the 1950 World Champion version of the Mercs, was inducted to the Alberta Sports Hall of Fame in 2011.

Dawe died in Edmonton on May 20, 2013, at age 88.

== See also ==
- Canada men's national ice hockey team
- Ice hockey at the 1952 Winter Olympics
- Ice hockey at the Olympic Games
- List of Canadian national ice hockey team rosters
- List of ice hockey teams in Alberta
