= Gordon Robertson (ice hockey) =

Canadian ice hockey player (1926–2019)

Gordie Robertson
- Born: June 25, 1926 Trail, British Columbia, Canada
- Died: October 10, 2019 (aged 93)
- Position: Right wing
- Played for: Trail Smoke Eaters; Edmonton Mercurys
- National team: Canada
- Playing career: 1946–1960
Medal record
Men's ice hockey
Gold medal – first place	1952 Oslo	Ice hockey

Gordon "Gordie" Robertson (June 25, 1926 – October 10, 2019) was a Canadian ice hockey player. He was a member of the Edmonton Mercurys team, which won a gold medal at the 1952 Winter Olympics in Oslo, Norway. Robertson died in October 2019 at the age of 93.
