= Francis Sullivan (ice hockey) =

Canadian ice hockey player

Frank Sullivan
- Born: July 7, 1917 Regina, Saskatchewan, Canada
- Died: January 5, 2007 (aged 89) Calgary, Alberta, Canada
- Height: 5 ft 8 in (173 cm)
- Weight: 145 lb (66 kg; 10 st 5 lb)
- Position: Center
- Shot: Left
- Played for: Regina Aces; Kimberley Dynamiters; Edmonton Mercurys
- National team: Canada
- Playing career: 1935–1957
Medal record
Men's ice hockey
Gold medal – first place	1952 Oslo	Ice hockey

Francis Cornelius Sullivan (June 7, 1917 – January 5, 2007) was a Canadian ice hockey player. He was a member of the Edmonton Mercurys that won a gold medal at the 1952 Winter Olympics.
