= Bruce Dickson (ice hockey) =

Canadian ice hockey player (1931–2023)

- Born: April 22, 1931 Edmonton, Alberta, Canada
- Died: December 1, 2023 (aged 92) Colorado, U.S.
- Height: 6 ft 0 in (183 cm)
- Weight: 175 lb (79 kg; 12 st 7 lb)
- Position: Right Wing
- Played for: Edmonton Mercurys; Denver Pioneers
- National team: Canada
- Playing career: 1951–1954
Medal record
Men's ice hockey
Gold medal – first place	1952 Oslo	Ice hockey

Robert Bruce Dickson (April 22, 1931 – December 1, 2023) was a Canadian ice hockey player. He was a member of the Edmonton Mercurys that won a gold medal at the 1952 Winter Olympics in Oslo, Norway. Dickson moved later to Littleton, Colorado in the United States. He died in Colorado on December 1, 2023, at the age of 92. At the time of his death, he was the last living member of 1952 Canadian Olympic ice hockey team.
