= Bob Watt (ice hockey) =

Canadian ice hockey player (1927–2010)

- Born: June 24, 1927 Innisfail, Alberta, Canada
- Died: May 11, 2010 (aged 82) Red Deer, Alberta, Canada
- Height: 5 ft 8 in (173 cm)
- Weight: 160 lb (73 kg; 11 st 6 lb)
- Position: Right wing
- Played for: Edmonton Mercurys
- National team: Canada
- Playing career: 1949–1959
Medal record
Men's ice hockey
Olympic Games
Gold medal – first place	1952 Oslo	Ice hockey
World Championship
Gold medal – first place	1950 London	Ice hockey

Robert McDonald Watt (June 24, 1927 – May 11, 2010) was a Canadian ice hockey player. He was a member of the Edmonton Mercurys that won a gold medal at the 1952 Winter Olympics.

== Awards and honors ==
Award	Year
All-WIHL Second Team	1957–58
AHCA West All-American	1958–59
