= William Gibson (ice hockey) =

Canadian ice hockey player

Bill Gibson
- Born: April 22, 1927 Merritt, BC, Canada
- Died: August 29, 2006 (aged 79) Lethbridge, Alberta, Canada
- Height: 6 ft 0 in (183 cm)
- Weight: 175 lb (79 kg; 12 st 7 lb)
- Position: Centre
- Shot: Right
- Played for: Lethbridge Maple Leafs; Edmonton Mercurys
- National team: Canada
- Playing career: 1947–1957
Medal record
Men's ice hockey
Gold medal – first place	1952 Oslo	Ice hockey

William James "Bill, Billy" Gibson (April 22, 1927 – August 29, 2006) was a Canadian ice hockey player.

He lived in Lethbridge, Alberta.

Gibson was a member of the Edmonton Mercurys that won a gold medal at the 1952 Winter Olympics in Oslo, Norway. During the tournament, he scored 15 goals and 7 assists in 8 games, making him the top scorer.
