= Robert Meyers (ice hockey) =

Canadian ice hockey player

Bob Meyers
- Born: August 11, 1924 Edmonton, Alberta, Canada
- Died: March 22, 2014 (aged 89) Edmonton, Alberta, Canada
- Position: Defence
- Played for: Edmonton Mercurys
- National team: Canada
- Playing career: 1941–1952
Medal record
Men's ice hockey
Gold medal – first place	1952 Oslo	Ice hockey

Robert Roderick Meyers (August 11, 1924 – March 22, 2014) was a Canadian ice hockey player. He was a member of the Edmonton Mercurys that won a gold medal at the 1952 Winter Olympics in Oslo, Norway.
