= Thomas Pollock (ice hockey) =

Canadian ice hockey player

Tom Pollock
- Born: August 1, 1925 Red Deer, Alberta, Canada
- Died: August 17, 1994 (aged 69) Red Deer, Alberta, Canada
- Position: Defenseman
- Played for: Edmonton Mercurys
- National team: Canada
- Playing career: 1942–1960
Medal record
Men's ice hockey
Gold medal – first place	1952 Oslo	Ice hockey

Thomas Allen Pollock (August 1, 1925 – August 17, 1994) was a Canadian ice hockey player. He was a member of the Edmonton Mercurys that won a gold medal at the 1952 Winter Olympics. Pollock died of a stroke in 1994; he was the first member of the 1952 Olympic team to die.
