= Louis Secco =

Canadian ice hockey player

- Born: January 18, 1927 Trail, British Columbia, Canada
- Died: October 27, 2008 (aged 81) British Columbia, Canada
- Position: Left Wing
- Played for: Trail Smoke Eaters; Edmonton Mercurys
- National team: Canada
- Playing career: 1946–1958
Medal record
Men's ice hockey
Gold medal – first place	1952 Oslo	Ice hockey

Louis John Secco (January 18, 1927 – October 27, 2008) was a Canadian ice hockey player. He was a member of the Edmonton Mercurys that won a gold medal at the 1952 Winter Olympics.
