= David Miller (ice hockey) =

Canadian ice hockey player

- Born: December 15, 1924 Wilkie, Saskatchewan, Canada
- Died: October 8, 1996 (aged 71) Victoria, British Columbia, Canada
- Position: Left wing
- Played for: Edmonton Mercurys; Streatham Redskins
- National team: Canada
- Playing career: 1945–1952
Medal record
Men's ice hockey
Gold medal – first place	1952 Oslo	Ice hockey

David Engelbert Miller (December 15, 1924 – October 8, 1996) was a Canadian ice hockey player. He was a member of the Edmonton Mercurys that won a gold medal at the 1952 Winter Olympics.
