= George Abel =

Canadian ice hockey player (1916–1996)

- Born: February 23, 1916 Melville, Saskatchewan, Canada
- Died: April 16, 1996 (aged 80) Melville, Saskatchewan, Canada
- Position: Centre
- Played for: Melville Millionaires; Edmonton Mercurys; Flin Flon Bombers
- National team: Canada
- Playing career: 1937–1954
Medal record
Men's ice hockey
Gold medal – first place	1952 Oslo	Ice hockey

George Gordon Abel (February 23, 1916 – April 16, 1996) was a Canadian ice hockey player. He played centre for the Edmonton Mercurys, and won the only Canadian gold medal playing in the 1952 Winter Olympics in Oslo, Norway.

== Biography ==
George was born and raised in Melville, Saskatchewan. Born into a true western Canadian hockey family, he played minor hockey while growing up and joined the Flin Flon Bombers in 1937. In 1946, choosing not to go professional, George returned to Melville to marry, start a family, and join his brothers Don and Lawrence in operating Abel's Cartage.

In 1950, George joined the Melville Millionaires. He played for Melville until 1952, gaining a provincial reputation as an exceptional stick-handler and prolific goal-scorer. For a time, he both coached the team and played simultaneously. At this time, George was known as "Mr. Hockey" in Saskatchewan.

In 1952, he accepted an invitation to join the Edmonton Mercurys to play for Canada's National hockey team in the 1952 Olympics. The team toured Europe for three months, playing 50 or 51 games, where George earned the nickname "Mr. Production". In Olympic competition at Oslo, Norway, he scored the winning goal in the final game, securing the only Canadian gold medal of the Olympics.

As an internationally renowned Canadian hockey player, George returned to life in Melville, where he remained active in hockey, fastball, softball, curling and fishing as a player or coach.

George's younger brother Sid Abel (February 22, 1918 – February 8, 2000) became a Canadian professional hockey player and later coach in the National Hockey League. His playing career spanned from the 1938–39 season until the 1953–54 season, playing for both the Detroit Red Wings and Chicago Black Hawks and was a member of three winning Stanley Cups in 1943, 1950, and 1952 with the Detroit Red Wings.

George Abel's nephew, Sid Abel's son, Gerry also briefly played in the NHL, and Sid's grandson Brent Johnson is a goaltender who last played for the Pittsburgh Penguins.
