= Al Purvis =

Canadian ice hockey player

- Born: January 9, 1929 Trochu, Alberta, Canada
- Died: August 13, 2009 (aged 80) Vancouver, British Columbia, Canada
- Position: Defence
- Played for: Calgary Buffaloes; Edmonton Mercurys
- National team: Canada
- Playing career: 1943–1952
Medal record
Men's ice hockey
Olympic Games
Gold medal – first place	1952 Oslo	Ice hockey
World Championship
Gold medal – first place	1950 London	Ice hockey

Allan Ruggles Purvis (January 9, 1929 – August 13, 2009) was a Canadian ice hockey player who played with the Edmonton Mercurys, a team which represented Canada and won a gold medal at the 1950 World Ice Hockey Championships and also won a gold medal at the 1952 Winter Olympics. He later became owner of Waterloo Ford, a local car dealership that had been the sponsor of his medal-winning hockey team.

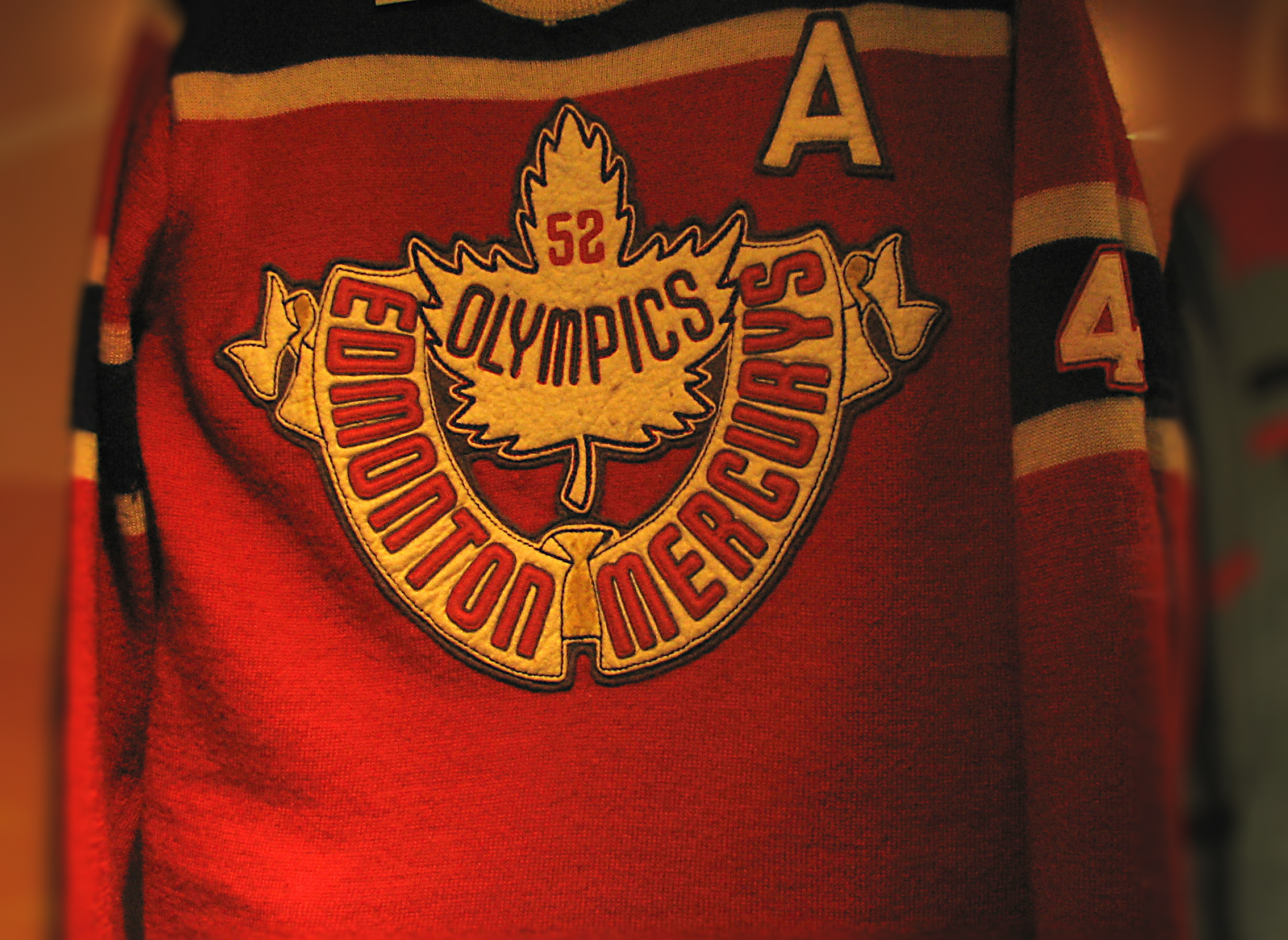
The #4 jersey Al Purvis wore as Assistant Captain of the Edmonton Mercurys ice hockey team in the 1952 Olympics

== Biography ==
Purvis was born in Trochu, Alberta. He moved with his family to Calgary and attended Western Canada High School there.

He was invited to join the Edmonton Mercurys when he was 19 years old, having played junior hockey for the Calgary Buffaloes. The Mercurys were sponsored by Waterloo Mercury, a local car dealership whose owner hired some of the team's players to work for his firm. Purvis, a defenceman, was the team's assistant captain. Though better known for his checking skills, Purvis was a goal scorer.

The Mercurys won the Western Intermediate League championship and were selected to represent Canada at the 1950 World Ice Hockey Championships held in London, England, where the Mercurys took the gold, winning all seven games they played in the tournament and outscoring their opponents by a margin of 88–5.

Two years later, the Canadian Amateur Hockey Association selected the Mercurys from among seven teams that had applied to represent Canada at the 1952 Winter Olympics held in Oslo, based on the strength of team's performance in the 1950 World Championships. Nine countries competed in Ice hockey at the 1952 Winter Olympics, with each team playing each other once. The Canadians played fast, tough hockey and won their first seven games by a margin of 68–11. The final game for the team was against the United States, who had lost one game to Sweden, meaning that the Canadians would win the gold medal if they didn't lose their last game. After jumping out to a 2–0 lead, the Americans tied the score. Donald Gauf scored to give the Canadians the lead, but the U.S. tied it again at 3–3 with minutes left in the game. A potential game winner for the U.S. ricocheted off the goal post and preserved the gold medal for Canada. Canada would not win another gold medal for another 50 years, when it won at the 2002 Winter Olympics in Salt Lake City.

Following the Olympic victory, Purvis went back to the dealership. He worked his way up the ladder in his 50 years at the firm, becoming sales manager and later the company's owner and chief executive. After Purvis retired in 2002, he was succeeded at the dealership by his son.

Purvis died at age 80 on August 13, 2009, at his home in the Victoria, British Columbia area due to heart disease. He had met his wife Jeanne while the two were in high school and they had two daughters and a son.
