= Ralph Hansch =

Canadian ice hockey player

- Born: May 20, 1924 Edmonton, Alberta, Canada
- Died: February 29, 2008 (aged 83) Edmonton, Alberta, Canada
- Position: Goaltender
- Caught: Left
- Played for: Edmonton Mercurys
- National team: Canada
- Playing career: 1948–1952
Medal record
Men's ice hockey
Gold medal – first place	1952 Oslo	Ice hockey

Ralph Lawrence Hansch (May 20, 1924 – February 29, 2008) was a Canadian ice hockey goaltender.

== Early life ==
He was born in Edmonton, Alberta. In 1950 and 1951, he played with the Edmonton Flyers.

== Career ==
Hansch was a member of the Edmonton Mercurys that won a gold medal at the 1952 Winter Olympics in Oslo, Norway. He is the only goaltender to wear number "0" at the Olympics. From 1949 to 1984, Hansch served as a firefighter in the Edmonton Fire Department.

== Personal life ==
Hansch and his wife, Bonnie, had three children. His son, Randy Hansch, played in the Western Hockey League and was general manager of the Edmonton Oil Kings.
