= John Davies (ice hockey) =

Canadian ice hockey player (1928–2009)

- Born: July 14, 1928 Edmonton, Alberta, Canada
- Died: January 19, 2009 (aged 80) Edmonton, Alberta, Canada
- Position: Defence
- Shot: Left
- Played for: Edmonton Mercurys
- National team: Canada
- Playing career: 1946–1952
Medal record
Men's ice hockey
Olympic Games
Gold medal – first place	1952 Oslo	Ice hockey
World Championship
Gold medal – first place	1950 London	Ice hockey

John Francis "Jack" Davies (July 14, 1928 – January 19, 2009) was a Canadian ice hockey player with the Edmonton Mercurys. He won a gold medal at the 1952 Winter Olympics. Davies, along with The Mercurys, were inducted into the Canadian Olympic Hall of Fame in 2002.
