= Eric Paterson =

Canadian ice hockey player

- Born: September 11, 1929 Edmonton, Alberta, Canada
- Died: January 14, 2014 (aged 84) Sherwood Park, Alberta, Canada
- Height: 5 ft 9 in (175 cm)
- Weight: 155 lb (70 kg; 11 st 1 lb)
- Position: Goaltender
- Caught: Left
- Played for: Edmonton Mercurys
- National team: Canada
- Playing career: 1950–1961
Medal record
Men's ice hockey
Gold medal – first place	1952 Oslo	Ice hockey

Eric Evan Paterson (September 11, 1929 – January 14, 2014) was a Canadian ice hockey player. He was a member of the Edmonton Mercurys that won a gold medal at the 1952 Winter Olympics in Oslo, Norway.
