= Donald Gauf =

Canadian ice hockey player

Don Gauf
- Born: January 1, 1927 Edmonton, Alberta, Canada
- Died: October 11, 2014 (aged 87) Edmonton, AB, CAN
- Position: Defenseman
- Played for: Edmonton Mercurys
- National team: Canada
- Playing career: 1949–1952
Medal record
Men's ice hockey
Olympic Games
Gold medal – first place	1952 Oslo	Ice hockey
World Championship
Gold medal – first place	1950 London	Ice hockey

Donald Valentine "Don" Gauf (January 1, 1927 – October 11, 2014) was a Canadian ice hockey player. He was a member of the Edmonton Mercurys that won a gold medal at the 1952 Winter Olympics in Oslo, Norway.
