= List of Canadian national ice hockey team rosters =

Below is a list of various national team ice hockey team rosters of Canada. The men's team, women's team and the junior team are included.

== Men's ==
=== 2026 Men's World Ice Hockey Championship ===
Head Coach: Misha Donskov.

No.	Pos.	Name	Height	Weight	Birthdate	Team
2	D	Dylan DeMelo	1.85 m (6 ft 1 in)	88 kg (194 lb)	1 May 1993 (aged 33)	(Canada) Winnipeg Jets
5	D	Denton Mateychuk	1.80 m (5 ft 11 in)	85 kg (188 lb)	12 July 2004 (aged 21)	(United States) Columbus Blue Jackets
6	D	Sam Dickinson	1.91 m (6 ft 3 in)	91 kg (200 lb)	7 June 2006 (aged 19)	(United States) San Jose Sharks
16	F	Connor Brown	1.83 m (6 ft 0 in)	83 kg (184 lb)	14 January 1994 (aged 32)	(United States) New Jersey Devils
18	F	Robert Thomas	1.83 m (6 ft 0 in)	94 kg (207 lb)	2 July 1999 (aged 26)	(United States) St. Louis Blues
22	D	Evan Bouchard	1.91 m (6 ft 3 in)	87 kg (192 lb)	20 October 1999 (aged 26)	(Canada) Edmonton Oilers
24	F	Dylan Cozens	1.91 m (6 ft 3 in)	93 kg (205 lb)	9 February 2001 (aged 25)	(Canada) Ottawa Senators
25	D	Darnell Nurse	1.93 m (6 ft 4 in)	98 kg (215 lb)	4 February 1995 (aged 31)	(Canada) Edmonton Oilers
28	D	Zach Whitecloud	1.88 m (6 ft 2 in)	95 kg (210 lb)	28 November 1996 (aged 29)	(Canada) Calgary Flames
29	D	Parker Wotherspoon	1.85 m (6 ft 1 in)	86 kg (190 lb)	24 August 1997 (aged 28)	(United States) Pittsburgh Penguins
33	G	Cam Talbot	1.91 m (6 ft 3 in)	92 kg (202 lb)	5 July 1987 (aged 38)	(United States) Detroit Red Wings
42	F	Gabriel Vilardi	1.91 m (6 ft 3 in)	98 kg (216 lb)	16 August 1999 (aged 26)	(Canada) Winnipeg Jets
44	D	Morgan Rielly	1.85 m (6 ft 1 in)	98 kg (216 lb)	9 March 1994 (aged 32)	(Canada) Toronto Maple Leafs
55	F	Mark Scheifele	1.91 m (6 ft 3 in)	94 kg (207 lb)	15 March 1993 (aged 33)	(Canada) Winnipeg Jets
58	F	Emmitt Finnie	1.85 m (6 ft 1 in)	88 kg (195 lb)	27 June 2005 (aged 20)	(United States) Detroit Red Wings
71	F	Macklin Celebrini – C	1.83 m (6 ft 0 in)	86 kg (190 lb)	13 June 2006 (aged 19)	(United States) San Jose Sharks
72	G	Jack Ivankovic	1.80 m (5 ft 11 in)	81 kg (179 lb)	22 May 2007 (aged 18)	(United States) Michigan Wolverines
73	G	Jet Greaves	1.83 m (6 ft 0 in)	85 kg (188 lb)	30 March 2001 (aged 25)	(United States) Columbus Blue Jackets
81	F	Dylan Holloway	1.85 m (6 ft 1 in)	94 kg (207 lb)	23 September 2001 (aged 24)	(United States) St. Louis Blues
87	F	Sidney Crosby – A	1.80 m (5 ft 11 in)	91 kg (201 lb)	7 August 1987 (aged 38)	(United States) Pittsburgh Penguins
90	F	Ryan O’Reilly – A	1.88 m (6 ft 2 in)	96 kg (212 lb)	7 February 1991 (aged 35)	(United States) Nashville Predators
91	F	John Tavares – A	1.85 m (6 ft 1 in)	98 kg (217 lb)	20 September 1990 (aged 35)	(Canada) Toronto Maple Leafs
93	F	Fraser Minten	1.88 m (6 ft 2 in)	93 kg (204 lb)	5 July 2004 (aged 21)	(United States) Boston Bruins

=== 2026 Winter Olympics ===
The first six players of Canada's roster were announced on June 16, 2025. The remainder of the team was named on December 31, 2025. On February 3, 2026, Anthony Cirelli was ruled out due to injury, with Sam Bennett named as his replacement. On February 5, Brayden Point was also ruled out and replaced by Seth Jarvis. On February 8, 2026, Canada named Sidney Crosby as team captain, with Connor McDavid and Cale Makar serving as alternate captains. Following an injury to Crosby in Canada's quarterfinal game against Czechia, McDavid served as captain for their semifinal game against Finland and the gold medal game against the United States, with Nathan MacKinnon serving as an additional alternate captain for both games.

Head coach: Jon Cooper

No.	Pos.	Name	Height	Weight	Birthdate	Team
6	D	Travis Sanheim	1.93 m (6 ft 4 in)	101 kg (223 lb)	29 March 1996 (aged 29)	(United States) Philadelphia Flyers
7	D	Devon Toews	1.85 m (6 ft 1 in)	87 kg (192 lb)	21 February 1994 (aged 31)	(United States) Colorado Avalanche
8	D	Cale Makar – A	1.83 m (6 ft 0 in)	85 kg (187 lb)	30 October 1998 (aged 27)	(United States) Colorado Avalanche
9	F	Sam Bennett	1.85 m (6 ft 1 in)	88 kg (194 lb)	20 June 1996 (aged 29)	(United States) Florida Panthers
10	F	Nick Suzuki	1.80 m (5 ft 11 in)	94 kg (207 lb)	10 August 1999 (aged 26)	(Canada) Montreal Canadiens
13	F	Sam Reinhart	1.85 m (6 ft 1 in)	89 kg (196 lb)	6 November 1995 (aged 30)	(United States) Florida Panthers
14	F	Bo Horvat	1.85 m (6 ft 1 in)	98 kg (216 lb)	5 April 1995 (aged 30)	(United States) New York Islanders
17	F	Macklin Celebrini	1.83 m (6 ft 0 in)	86 kg (190 lb)	13 June 2006 (aged 19)	(United States) San Jose Sharks
20	D	Thomas Harley	1.91 m (6 ft 3 in)	96 kg (212 lb)	19 August 2001 (aged 24)	(United States) Dallas Stars
24	F	Seth Jarvis	1.78 m (5 ft 10 in)	82 kg (181 lb)	1 February 2002 (aged 24)	(United States) Carolina Hurricanes
27	D	Shea Theodore	1.88 m (6 ft 2 in)	90 kg (198 lb)	3 August 1995 (aged 30)	(United States) Vegas Golden Knights
29	F	Nathan MacKinnon – A	1.83 m (6 ft 0 in)	91 kg (201 lb)	1 September 1995 (aged 30)	(United States) Colorado Avalanche
35	G	Darcy Kuemper	1.96 m (6 ft 5 in)	97 kg (214 lb)	5 May 1990 (aged 35)	(United States) Los Angeles Kings
38	F	Brandon Hagel	1.88 m (6 ft 2 in)	82 kg (181 lb)	27 August 1998 (aged 27)	(United States) Tampa Bay Lightning
43	F	Tom Wilson	1.93 m (6 ft 4 in)	103 kg (227 lb)	29 March 1994 (aged 31)	(United States) Washington Capitals
44	D	Josh Morrissey	1.83 m (6 ft 0 in)	89 kg (196 lb)	28 March 1995 (aged 30)	(Canada) Winnipeg Jets
48	G	Logan Thompson	1.93 m (6 ft 4 in)	94 kg (207 lb)	25 February 1997 (aged 28)	(United States) Washington Capitals
50	G	Jordan Binnington	1.88 m (6 ft 2 in)	78 kg (172 lb)	11 July 1993 (aged 32)	(United States) St. Louis Blues
55	D	Colton Parayko	1.98 m (6 ft 6 in)	104 kg (229 lb)	12 May 1993 (aged 32)	(United States) St. Louis Blues
61	F	Mark Stone	1.93 m (6 ft 4 in)	95 kg (209 lb)	13 May 1992 (aged 33)	(United States) Vegas Golden Knights
63	F	Brad Marchand	1.75 m (5 ft 9 in)	80 kg (176 lb)	11 May 1988 (aged 37)	(United States) Florida Panthers
87	F	Sidney Crosby – C	1.80 m (5 ft 11 in)	91 kg (201 lb)	7 August 1987 (aged 38)	(United States) Pittsburgh Penguins
89	D	Drew Doughty	1.85 m (6 ft 1 in)	95 kg (209 lb)	8 December 1989 (aged 36)	(United States) Los Angeles Kings
93	F	Mitch Marner	1.83 m (6 ft 0 in)	82 kg (181 lb)	5 May 1997 (aged 28)	(United States) Vegas Golden Knights
97	F	Connor McDavid – A / C	1.85 m (6 ft 1 in)	88 kg (194 lb)	13 January 1997 (aged 29)	(Canada) Edmonton Oilers

=== 2025 Men's World Ice Hockey Championship ===
- Head coach: (Manitoba) Dean Evason
- Assistant coach: (British Columbia) Ryan Huska
- Assistant coach: (Ontario) Andrew Brunette
- Assistant coach: (British Columbia) Steve McCarthy

Goaltender

- (Ontario) Jordan Binnington – St. Louis Blues
- (Quebec) Marc-Andre Fleury – Minnesota Wild
- (British Columbia) Dylan Garand – New York Rangers

Defence

- (Prince Edward Island) Noah Dobson – New York Islanders
- (Alberta) Ryker Evans – Seattle Kraken
- (Quebec) Mike Matheson – Montreal Canadiens
- (Ontario) Brandon Montour – Seattle Kraken
- (Manitoba) Travis Sanheim – Philadelphia Flyers
- (Alberta) Jared Spurgeon – Minnesota Wild
- (Ontario) MacKenzie Weegar – Calgary Flames

Forward

- (Nova Scotia) Sidney Crosby – Pittsburgh Penguins
- (British Columbia) Macklin Celebrini – San Jose Sharks
- (Ontario) Will Cuylle – New York Rangers
- (Quebec) Phillip Danault - Los Angeles Kings
- (Ontario) Adam Fantilli – Columbus Blue Jackets
- (Ontario) Tyson Foerster – Philadelphia Flyers
- (Ontario) Barrett Hayton – Utah Mammoth
- (Ontario) Bo Horvat – New York Islanders
- (British Columbia) Kent Johnson – Columbus Blue Jackets
- (Ontario) Travis Konecny – Philadelphia Flyers
- (Nova Scotia) Nathan MacKinnon – Colorado Avalanche
- (Ontario) Ryan O'Reilly – Nashville Predators
- (Manitoba) Brayden Schenn – St. Louis Blues

=== 2025 Four Nations Face-Off ===
- Head coach: Jon Cooper
- Assistant coach: Bruce Cassidy
- Assistant coach: Peter DeBoer
- Assistant coach: Rick Tocchet

No.	Pos.	Name	S/G	Birthplace	Birthdate	Team
5	D	Devon Toews	L	Abbotsford, British Columbia	April 21, 1994 (age 32)	Colorado Avalanche
6	D	Travis Sanheim	L	Elkhorn, Manitoba	March 29, 1996 (age 30)	Philadelphia Flyers
8	D	Cale Makar (A)	R	Calgary, Alberta	October 30, 1998 (age 27)	Colorado Avalanche
9	F	Sam Bennett	L	Holland Landing, Ontario	June 20, 1996 (age 30)	Florida Panthers
11	F	Travis Konecny	R	London, Ontario	March 11, 1997 (age 29)	Philadelphia Flyers
13	F	Sam Reinhart	R	North Vancouver, British Columbia	November 6, 1995 (age 30)	Florida Panthers
16	F	Mitch Marner	R	Markham, Ontario	May 5, 1997 (age 29)	Toronto Maple Leafs
21	F	Brayden Point	R	Calgary, Alberta	March 13, 1996 (age 30)	Tampa Bay Lightning
24	F	Seth Jarvis	R	Winnipeg, Manitoba	February 1, 2002 (age 24)	Carolina Hurricanes
27	D	Shea Theodore	L	Aldergrove, British Columbia	August 3, 1995 (age 31)	Vegas Golden Knights
29	F	Nathan MacKinnon	R	Halifax, Nova Scotia	September 1, 1995 (age 30)	Colorado Avalanche
33	G	Adin Hill	L	Comox, British Columbia	May 11, 1996 (age 30)	Vegas Golden Knights
35	G	Sam Montembeault	L	Bécancour, Quebec	October 30, 1996 (age 29)	Montreal Canadiens
38	F	Brandon Hagel	L	Saskatoon, Saskatchewan	August 27, 1998 (age 28)	Tampa Bay Lightning
44	D	Josh Morrissey	L	Calgary, Alberta	March 28, 1995 (age 31)	Winnipeg Jets
48	D	Thomas Harley	L	Syracuse, New York (Note: Harley was born in the United States to Canadian parents.)	August 19, 2001 (age 25)	Dallas Stars
50	G	Jordan Binnington	L	Richmond Hill, Ontario	July 11, 1993 (age 33)	St. Louis Blues
55	D	Colton Parayko	R	St. Albert, Alberta	May 12, 1993 (age 33)	St. Louis Blues
61	F	Mark Stone	R	Winnipeg, Manitoba	May 13, 1992 (age 34)	Vegas Golden Knights
63	F	Brad Marchand (A)	L	Hammonds Plains, Nova Scotia	May 11, 1988 (age 38)	Boston Bruins
71	F	Anthony Cirelli	L	Woodbridge, Ontario	July 15, 1997 (age 29)	Tampa Bay Lightning
87	F	Sidney Crosby (C)	L	Halifax, Nova Scotia	August 7, 1987 (age 39)	Pittsburgh Penguins
89	D	Drew Doughty	R	London, Ontario	December 8, 1989 (age 36)	Los Angeles Kings
97	F	Connor McDavid (A)	L	Richmond Hill, Ontario	January 13, 1997 (age 29)	Edmonton Oilers

=== 2024 Men's World Ice Hockey Championship ===
- Head coach: (Quebec) Andre Tourigny
- Assistant coach: (Manitoba) Dean Evason
- Assistant coach: (Ontario) Steve Ott
- Assistant coach: (Ontario) Jay Woodcroft

Goaltender

- (Ontario) Jordan Binnington – St. Louis Blues
- (Ontario) Nico Daws – New Jersey Devils
- (Manitoba) Joel Hofer – St. Louis Blues

Defence

- (British Columbia) Bowen Byram – Buffalo Sabres
- (Alberta) Kaiden Guhle – Montreal Canadiens
- (Ontario) Jamie Oleksiak – Seattle Kraken
- (Alberta) Colton Parayko (A) – St. Louis Blues
- (Ontario) Owen Power – Buffalo Sabres
- (Manitoba) Damon Severson (A) – Columbus Blue Jackets
- (Alberta) Olen Zellweger – Anaheim Ducks

Forward

- (British Columbia) Connor Bedard – Chicago Blackhawks
- (Ontario) Michael Bunting – Pittsburgh Penguins
- (Yukon) Dylan Cozens – Buffalo Sabres
- (Quebec) Pierre-Luc Dubois - Los Angeles Kings
- (Alberta) Ridly Greig – Ottawa Senators
- (Alberta) Dylan Guenther – Utah
- (Alberta) Brandon Hagel – Tampa Bay Lightning
- (Ontario) Andrew Mangiapane (A) – Calgary Flames
- (Ontario) Jack McBain – Utah
- (Ontario) Jared McCann – Seattle Kraken
- (Newfoundland and Labrador) Dawson Mercer – New Jersey Devils
- (Ontario) Nick Paul – Tampa Bay Lightning
- (Ontario) Brandon Tanev – Seattle Kraken
- (Ontario) John Tavares (C) - Toronto Maple Leafs

=== 2023 Men's World Ice Hockey Championship ===
- Head coach: (Quebec) Andre Tourigny
- Assistant coach: (Nova Scotia) Troy Ryan
- Assistant coach: (Ontario) D.J. Smith
- Assistant coach: (Quebec) Alex Tanguay

Goaltender

- (Manitoba) Joel Hofer – St. Louis Blues
- (Quebec) Devon Levi – Buffalo Sabres
- (Quebec) Sam Montembeault – Montreal Canadiens

Defence

- (Nova Scotia) Justin Barron – Montreal Canadiens
- (Saskatchewan) Ethan Bear – Vancouver Canucks
- (British Columbia) Brad Hunt – Colorado Avalanche
- (Quebec) Pierre-Olivier Joseph – Pittsburgh Penguins
- (Ontario) Jake Middleton – Minnesota Wild
- (Alberta) Tyler Myers – Vancouver Canucks
- (Ontario) MacKenzie Weegar (A) – Calgary Flames

Forward

- (Quebec) Sammy Blais – St. Louis Blues
- (Ontario) Michael Carcone – Tucson Roadrunners
- (Ontario) Lawson Crouse (A) – Arizona Coyotes
- (Ontario) Adam Fantilli – Michigan Wolverines
- (Manitoba) Cody Glass – Nashville Predators
- (Alberta) Peyton Krebs – Buffalo Sabres
- (Ontario) Scott Laughton (A) – Philadelphia Flyers
- (British Columbia) Milan Lucic (A) – Calgary Flames
- (Ontario) Jack McBain – Arizona Coyotes
- (Alberta) Jake Neighbours – St. Louis Blues
- (Ontario) Jack Quinn – Buffalo Sabres
- (Ontario) Tyler Toffoli (C) – Calgary Flames
- (Quebec) Joe Veleno – Detroit Red Wings

=== 2022 Men's World Ice Hockey Championship ===
- Head coach: (Ontario) Claude Julien
- Assistant coach: (Alberta) Nolan Baumgartner
- Assistant coach: (Ontario) D.J. Smith
- Assistant coach: (Quebec) Andre Tourigny

Goaltender

- (Manitoba) Chris Driedger – Seattle Kraken
- (Alberta) Logan Thompson – Vegas Golden Knights
- (Alberta) Matt Tomkins – Frölunda HC

Defence

- (Quebec) Thomas Chabot (C) – Ottawa Senators
- (Nova Scotia) Ryan Graves – New Jersey Devils
- (Alberta) Nick Holden – Ottawa Senators
- (British Columbia) Dysin Mayo – Arizona Coyotes
- (Manitoba) Travis Sanheim – Philadelphia Flyers
- (Saskatchewan) Damon Severson (A) – New Jersey Devils
- (Manitoba) Zach Whitecloud – Vegas Golden Knights

Forward

- (Ontario) Josh Anderson (A) – Montreal Canadiens
- (British Columbia) Mathew Barzal – New York Islanders
- (Nova Scotia) Drake Batherson – Ottawa Senators
- (Quebec) Maxime Comtois – Anaheim Ducks
- (Northwest Territories) Dylan Cozens – Buffalo Sabres
- (Quebec) Pierre-Luc Dubois (A) – Winnipeg Jets
- (Manitoba) Morgan Geekie – Seattle Kraken
- (Alberta) Noah Gregor – San Jose Sharks
- (British Columbia) Kent Johnson – Columbus Blue Jackets
- (Alberta) Adam Lowry (A) – Winnipeg Jets
- (Newfoundland and Labrador) Dawson Mercer – New Jersey Devils
- (Ontario) Eric O'Dell – Dynamo Moscow
- (Quebec) Nicolas Roy – Vegas Golden Knights
- (Saskatchewan) Cole Sillinger – Columbus Blue Jackets

=== 2022 Winter Olympics ===
Roster for the 2022 Winter Olympics. NHL players were not allowed to participate.

Head coach: Claude Julien

No.	Pos.	Name	Height	Weight	Birthdate	Team
1	G	Devon Levi	6 ft 0 in (183 cm)	185 lb (84 kg)	December 27, 2001 (aged 20)	(United States) Northeastern Huskies
3	D	Brandon Gormley	6 ft 2 in (188 cm)	196 lb (89 kg)	February 18, 1992 (aged 29)	(Russia) Lokomotiv Yaroslavl
7	F	Daniel Carr	6 ft 0 in (183 cm)	194 lb (88 kg)	November 1, 1991 (aged 30)	(Switzerland) HC Lugano
9	F	Corban Knight	6 ft 1 in (185 cm)	196 lb (89 kg)	September 10, 1990 (aged 31)	(Russia) Avangard Omsk
10	F	Ben Street	6 ft 0 in (183 cm)	190 lb (86 kg)	February 13, 1987 (aged 34)	(Germany) EHC Red Bull München
11	F	Jack McBain	6 ft 3 in (191 cm)	201 lb (91 kg)	January 6, 2000 (aged 22)	(United States) Boston College Eagles
12	F	Eric Staal (C)	6 ft 4 in (193 cm)	194 lb (88 kg)	October 29, 1984 (aged 37)	(United States) Iowa Wild
15	F	Adam Tambellini	6 ft 4 in (193 cm)	194 lb (88 kg)	November 1, 1994 (aged 27)	(Sweden) Rögle BK
19	F	Eric O'Dell	6 ft 0 in (183 cm)	205 lb (93 kg)	June 21, 1990 (aged 31)	(Russia) HC Dynamo Moscow
20	D	Alex Grant	6 ft 3 in (191 cm)	209 lb (95 kg)	January 20, 1989 (aged 33)	(Finland) Jokerit
22	D	Owen Power	6 ft 6 in (198 cm)	214 lb (97 kg)	November 22, 2002 (aged 19)	(United States) Michigan Wolverines
23	D	Tyler Wotherspoon	6 ft 2 in (188 cm)	207 lb (94 kg)	March 12, 1993 (aged 28)	(United States) Utica Comets
26	F	Daniel Winnik	6 ft 2 in (188 cm)	209 lb (95 kg)	March 6, 1985 (aged 36)	(Switzerland) Genève-Servette HC
27	F	Adam Cracknell	6 ft 3 in (191 cm)	209 lb (95 kg)	July 15, 1985 (aged 36)	(United States) Bakersfield Condors
32	F	Mason McTavish	6 ft 1 in (185 cm)	207 lb (94 kg)	January 30, 2003 (aged 19)	(Canada) Hamilton Bulldogs
37	D	Mat Robinson	5 ft 9 in (175 cm)	181 lb (82 kg)	January 20, 1986 (aged 36)	(Russia) SKA Saint Petersburg
39	F	Landon Ferraro	6 ft 0 in (183 cm)	176 lb (80 kg)	August 8, 1991 (aged 30)	(Germany) Kölner Haie
44	D	Mark Barberio	6 ft 1 in (185 cm)	207 lb (94 kg)	March 23, 1990 (aged 31)	(Russia) Ak Bars Kazan
51	F	David Desharnais (A)	5 ft 7 in (170 cm)	176 lb (80 kg)	September 14, 1986 (aged 35)	(Switzerland) HC Fribourg-Gottéron
56	D	Maxim Noreau (A)	5 ft 11 in (180 cm)	196 lb (89 kg)	May 24, 1987 (aged 34)	(Switzerland) ZSC Lions
60	D	Jason Demers	6 ft 1 in (185 cm)	194 lb (88 kg)	June 9, 1988 (aged 33)	(Russia) Ak Bars Kazan
80	G	Edward Pasquale	6 ft 3 in (191 cm)	218 lb (99 kg)	November 20, 1990 (aged 31)	(Russia) Lokomotiv Yaroslavl
90	G	Matt Tomkins	6 ft 3 in (191 cm)	194 lb (88 kg)	June 19, 1994 (aged 27)	(Sweden) Frölunda HC
91	F	Jordan Weal	5 ft 10 in (178 cm)	179 lb (81 kg)	April 15, 1992 (aged 29)	(Russia) Ak Bars Kazan
96	F	Josh Ho-Sang	6 ft 0 in (183 cm)	172 lb (78 kg)	January 22, 1996 (aged 26)	(Canada) Toronto Marlies

=== 2021 Men's World Ice Hockey Championship ===
- Head coach: (Prince Edward Island) Gerard Gallant
- Assistant coach: (Alberta) Michael Dyck
- Assistant coach: (Prince Edward Island) Mike Kelly
- Assistant coach: (Quebec) Andre Tourigny

Goaltender

- (Alberta) Adin Hill – Arizona Coyotes
- (Saskatchewan) Darcy Kuemper – Arizona Coyotes
- (Ontario) Michael DiPietro – Vancouver Canucks

Defence

- (Saskatchewan) Braden Schneider – Brandon Wheat Kings
- (Alberta) Jacob Bernard-Docker – Ottawa Senators
- (Ontario) Colin Miller – Buffalo Sabres
- (Ontario) Owen Power – University of Michigan
- (Ontario) Sean Walker – Los Angeles Kings
- (Ontario) Mario Ferraro – San Jose Sharks
- (British Columbia) Troy Stecher – Detroit Red Wings
- (Quebec) Nicolas Beaudin – Chicago Blackhawks

Forward

- (Ontario) Liam Foudy – Columbus Blue Jackets
- (Alberta) Jaret Anderson-Dolan – Los Angeles Kings
- (Ontario) Gabriel Vilardi – Los Angeles Kings
- (Ontario) Adam Henrique (C) – Anaheim Ducks
- (Ontario) Justin Danforth – Columbus Blue Jackets
- (Ontario) Nick Paul – Ottawa Senators
- (Alberta) Brandon Hagel – Chicago Blackhawks
- (Ontario) Michael Bunting – Arizona Coyotes
- (Ontario) Connor Brown (A) – Ottawa Senators
- (Quebec) Maxime Comtois – Anaheim Ducks
- (Ontario) Brandon Pirri – Chicago Blackhawks
- (Ontario) Andrew Mangiapane – Calgary Flames
- (Ontario) Cole Perfetti – Saginaw Spirit

=== 2019 Men's World Ice Hockey Championship ===
- Head coach: (Quebec) Alain Vigneault
- Assistant coach: (Ontario) Kirk Muller
- Assistant coach: (Alberta) Lindy Ruff
- Assistant coach: (Alberta) Dave Hakstol

Goaltender

- (Ontario) Matt Murray – Pittsburgh Penguins
- (Alberta) Carter Hart – Philadelphia Flyers
- (Ontario) Mackenzie Blackwood – New Jersey Devils

Defence

- (British Columbia) Dante Fabbro – Nashville Predators
- (British Columbia) Shea Theodore – Vegas Golden Knights
- (Saskatchewan) Damon Severson – New Jersey Devils
- (Ontario) Darnell Nurse – Edmonton Oilers
- (British Columbia) Troy Stecher – Vancouver Canucks
- (Quebec) Thomas Chabot – Ottawa Senators
- (Ontario) Brandon Montour – Buffalo Sabres
- (New Brunswick) Philippe Myers – Philadelphia Flyers

Forward

- (Manitoba) Mark Stone (A) – Vegas Golden Knights
- (British Columbia) Sam Reinhart – Buffalo Sabres
- (New Brunswick) Sean Couturier (A) – Philadelphia Flyers
- (Ontario) Adam Henrique – Anaheim Ducks
- (Ontario) Jared McCann – Pittsburgh Penguins
- (Ontario) Dylan Strome – Chicago Blackhawks
- (Quebec) Mathieu Joseph – Tampa Bay Lightning
- (Quebec) Anthony Mantha – Detroit Red Wings
- (Ontario) Tyler Bertuzzi – Detroit Red Wings
- (Ontario) Anthony Cirelli – Tampa Bay Lightning
- (Quebec) Jonathan Marchessault – Vegas Golden Knights
- (British Columbia) Kyle Turris (C) – Nashville Predators
- (Quebec) Pierre-Luc Dubois – Columbus Blue Jackets
- (British Columbia) Tyson Jost – Colorado Avalanche

=== 2018 Men's World Ice Hockey Championship ===
- Head coach: (Alberta) Bill Peters
- Assistant coach: (Ontario) Bob Boughner

Goaltender

- (Ontario) Michael DiPietro – Windsor Spitfires
- (Ontario) Curtis McElhinney – Carolina Hurricanes
- (Saskatchewan) Darcy Kuemper – Arizona Coyotes

Defence

- (Manitoba) Joel Edmundson – St. Louis Blues
- (Ontario) Aaron Ekblad – Florida Panthers
- (Manitoba) Ryan Pulock – New York Islanders
- (Ontario) Darnell Nurse – Edmonton Oilers
- (Saskatchewan) Ryan Murray – Columbus Blue Jackets
- (Quebec) Thomas Chabot – Ottawa Senators
- (Alberta) Colton Parayko – St. Louis Blues
- (Quebec) Marc–Édouard Vlasic – San Jose Sharks

Forward

- (Saskatchewan) Jordan Eberle – New York Islanders
- (Saskatchewan) Brayden Schenn (A) – St. Louis Blues
- (Ontario) Josh Bailey – New York Islanders
- (British Columbia) Mathew Barzal – New York Islanders
- (Saskatchewan) Jaden Schwartz – St. Louis Blues
- (Quebec) Pierre-Luc Dubois – Columbus Blue Jackets
- (British Columbia) Tyson Jost – Colorado Avalanche
- (Ontario) Jean-Gabriel Pageau – Ottawa Senators
- (Ontario) Bo Horvat – Vancouver Canucks
- (Quebec) Anthony Beauvillier – New York Islanders
- (Ontario) Ryan O'Reilly (A) – Buffalo Sabres
- (British Columbia) Ryan Nugent-Hopkins – Edmonton Oilers
- (Ontario) Connor McDavid (C) – Edmonton Oilers
- (British Columbia) Kyle Turris – Nashville Predators

=== 2018 Winter Olympics ===
Roster for the 2018 Winter Olympics. NHL players were not allowed to participate.

The following is the Canadian roster for the men's ice hockey tournament at the 2018 Winter Olympics.

Head coach: (Canada) Willie Desjardins Assistant coaches: (Canada) Dave King, (Canada) Scott Walker, (Canada) Craig Woodcroft

No.	Pos.	Name	Height	Weight	Birthdate	Birthplace	2017–18 team
3	D	Karl Stollery	5 ft 11 in (1.80 m)	181 lb (82 kg)	November 21, 1987	Camrose, Alberta	(Latvia) Dinamo Riga (KHL)
4	D	Chris Lee – A	6 ft 0 in (1.83 m)	185 lb (84 kg)	October 3, 1980	MacTier, Ontario	(Russia) Metallurg Magnitogorsk (KHL)
5	D	Chay Genoway	5 ft 9 in (1.75 m)	176 lb (80 kg)	December 20, 1986	Morden, Manitoba	(Russia) HC Lada Togliatti (KHL)
7	F	Gilbert Brulé	5 ft 10 in (1.78 m)	190 lb (86 kg)	January 1, 1987	Edmonton, Alberta	(China) Kunlun Red Star (KHL)
8	F	Wojtek Wolski	6 ft 3 in (1.91 m)	220 lb (100 kg)	February 24, 1986	Zabrze, Poland	(Russia) Metallurg Magnitogorsk (KHL)
9	F	Derek Roy – A	5 ft 9 in (1.75 m)	187 lb (85 kg)	May 4, 1983	Rockland, Ontario	(Sweden) Linköpings HC (SHL)
11	F	Chris Kelly – C	6 ft 0 in (1.83 m)	194 lb (88 kg)	November 11, 1980	Toronto, Ontario	(Canada) Belleville Senators (AHL)
12	F	Rob Klinkhammer	6 ft 2 in (1.88 m)	216 lb (98 kg)	August 12, 1986	Lethbridge, Alberta	(Russia) Ak Bars Kazan (KHL)
15	F	Brandon Kozun	5 ft 8 in (1.73 m)	172 lb (78 kg)	March 8, 1990	Los Angeles, California, United States	(Russia) Lokomotiv Yaroslavl (KHL)
16	F	Quinton Howden	6 ft 2 in (1.88 m)	190 lb (86 kg)	January 21, 1992	Oakbank, Manitoba	(Belarus) HC Dinamo Minsk (KHL)
17	F	Rene Bourque – A	6 ft 2 in (1.88 m)	216 lb (98 kg)	December 10, 1981	Lac La Biche, Alberta	(Sweden) Djurgårdens IF (SHL)
18	D	Marc-André Gragnani	6 ft 3 in (1.91 m)	205 lb (93 kg)	March 11, 1987	L'Île-Bizard, Quebec	(Belarus) HC Dinamo Minsk (KHL)
19	F	Andrew Ebbett – A	5 ft 9 in (1.75 m)	176 lb (80 kg)	January 2, 1983	Vernon, British Columbia	(Switzerland) SC Bern (NL)
21	F	Mason Raymond	6 ft 1 in (1.85 m)	179 lb (81 kg)	September 17, 1985	Cochrane, Alberta	(Switzerland) SC Bern (NL)
22	F	Eric O'Dell	6 ft 1 in (1.85 m)	201 lb (91 kg)	June 21, 1990	Ottawa, Ontario	(Russia) HC Sochi (KHL)
24	D	Stefan Elliott	6 ft 1 in (1.85 m)	190 lb (86 kg)	January 30, 1991	Vancouver, British Columbia	(Sweden) HV71 (SHL)
27	D	Cody Goloubef	6 ft 1 in (1.85 m)	201 lb (91 kg)	November 30, 1989	Oakville, Ontario	(United States) Stockton Heat (AHL)
30	G	Ben Scrivens	6 ft 2 in (1.88 m)	198 lb (90 kg)	September 11, 1986	Spruce Grove, Alberta	(Russia) Salavat Yulaev Ufa (KHL)
31	G	Kevin Poulin	6 ft 2 in (1.88 m)	205 lb (93 kg)	April 12, 1990	Montreal, Quebec	(Switzerland) EHC Kloten (NL)
35	G	Justin Peters	6 ft 1 in (1.85 m)	209 lb (95 kg)	August 30, 1986	Blyth, Ontario	(Germany) Kölner Haie (DEL)
37	D	Mat Robinson	5 ft 9 in (1.75 m)	185 lb (84 kg)	June 20, 1986	Calgary, Alberta	(Russia) CSKA Moscow (KHL)
40	F	Maxim Lapierre	6 ft 0 in (1.83 m)	216 lb (98 kg)	March 29, 1985	Saint-Leonard, Quebec	(Switzerland) HC Lugano (NL)
56	D	Maxim Noreau – A	6 ft 0 in (1.83 m)	198 lb (90 kg)	May 24, 1987	Montreal, Quebec	(Switzerland) SC Bern (NL)
91	F	Linden Vey	6 ft 0 in (1.83 m)	190 lb (86 kg)	July 17, 1991	Wakaw, Saskatchewan	(Switzerland) ZSC Lions (NL)
92	F	Christian Thomas	5 ft 9 in (1.75 m)	174 lb (79 kg)	May 26, 1992	Toronto, Ontario	(United States) Wilkes-Barre/Scranton Penguins (AHL)

=== 2017 Men's World Ice Hockey Championship ===
- Head coach: (British Columbia) Jon Cooper
- Assistant coach: (Prince Edward Island) Gerard Gallant
- Assistant coach: (Alberta) Dave Hakstol
- Assistant coach: (Saskatchewan) Dave King

Goaltender

- (Alberta) Eric Comrie – Manitoba Moose
- (Saskatchewan) Chad Johnson – Calgary Flames
- (Manitoba) Calvin Pickard – Colorado Avalanche

Defence

- (British Columbia) Tyson Barrie – Colorado Avalanche
- (Quebec) Jason Demers – Florida Panthers
- (Alberta) Josh Morrissey – Winnipeg Jets
- (Alberta) Colton Parayko – St. Louis Blues
- (Quebec) Mike Matheson – Florida Panthers
- (Ontario) Calvin de Haan – New York Islanders
- (Ontario) Chris Lee – Metallurg Magnitogorsk
- (Quebec) Marc–Édouard Vlasic (A) – San Jose Sharks

Forward

- (Ontario) Matt Duchene – Colorado Avalanche
- (Saskatchewan) Brayden Schenn – Philadelphia Flyers
- (Ontario) Travis Konecny – Philadelphia Flyers
- (New Brunswick) Sean Couturier – Philadelphia Flyers
- (Ontario) Mitch Marner – Toronto Maple Leafs
- (Ontario) Wayne Simmonds – Philadelphia Flyers
- (Alberta) Brayden Point – Tampa Bay Lightning
- (Ontario) Claude Giroux (C) – Philadelphia Flyers
- (Nova Scotia) Nathan MacKinnon – Colorado Avalanche
- (Ontario) Jeff Skinner – Carolina Hurricanes
- (Ontario) Mark Scheifele – Winnipeg Jets
- (Nova Scotia) Alexander Killorn – Tampa Bay Lightning
- (Ontario) Ryan O'Reilly (A)– Buffalo Sabres

=== 2016 World Cup of Hockey ===
Head coach: Mike Babcock

No.	Pos.	Name	Height	Weight	Birthdate	2016–17 Team
50	G	Corey Crawford	1.88 m (6 ft 2 in)	94 kg (207 lb)	December 31, 1984 (aged 31)	(United States) Chicago Blackhawks
70	G	Braden Holtby	1.88 m (6 ft 2 in)	92 kg (203 lb)	September 16, 1989 (aged 27)	(United States) Washington Capitals
31	G	Carey Price	1.91 m (6 ft 3 in)	98 kg (216 lb)	August 16, 1987 (aged 29)	(Canada) Montreal Canadiens
4	D	Jay Bouwmeester	1.93 m (6 ft 4 in)	96 kg (212 lb)	September 27, 1983 (aged 32)	(United States) St. Louis Blues
88	D	Brent Burns	1.96 m (6 ft 5 in)	105 kg (231 lb)	March 9, 1985 (aged 31)	(United States) San Jose Sharks
8	D	Drew Doughty	1.85 m (6 ft 1 in)	88 kg (194 lb)	December 8, 1989 (aged 26)	(United States) Los Angeles Kings
7	D	Jake Muzzin	1.91 m (6 ft 3 in)	98 kg (216 lb)	February 21, 1989 (aged 27)	(United States) Los Angeles Kings
27	D	Alex Pietrangelo	1.91 m (6 ft 3 in)	95 kg (209 lb)	January 18, 1990 (aged 26)	(United States) St. Louis Blues
44	D	Marc-Édouard Vlasic	1.85 m (6 ft 1 in)	91 kg (201 lb)	March 30, 1987 (aged 29)	(United States) San Jose Sharks
6	D	Shea Weber (A)	1.96 m (6 ft 5 in)	107 kg (236 lb)	August 14, 1985 (aged 31)	(Canada) Montreal Canadiens
37	C	Patrice Bergeron	1.88 m (6 ft 2 in)	88 kg (194 lb)	July 24, 1985 (aged 31)	(United States) Boston Bruins
39	C	Logan Couture	1.85 m (6 ft 1 in)	88 kg (194 lb)	March 28, 1989 (aged 27)	(United States) San Jose Sharks
87	C	Sidney Crosby (C)	1.80 m (5 ft 11 in)	91 kg (201 lb)	August 7, 1987 (aged 29)	(United States) Pittsburgh Penguins
9	C	Matt Duchene	1.80 m (5 ft 11 in)	91 kg (201 lb)	January 16, 1991 (aged 25)	(United States) Colorado Avalanche
15	C	Ryan Getzlaf	1.93 m (6 ft 4 in)	100 kg (220 lb)	May 10, 1985 (aged 31)	(United States) Anaheim Ducks
28	C	Claude Giroux	1.80 m (5 ft 11 in)	84 kg (185 lb)	January 12, 1988 (aged 28)	(United States) Philadelphia Flyers
63	LW	Brad Marchand	1.75 m (5 ft 9 in)	82 kg (181 lb)	May 11, 1988 (aged 28)	(United States) Boston Bruins
90	C	Ryan O'Reilly	1.83 m (6 ft 0 in)	91 kg (201 lb)	February 7, 1991 (aged 25)	(United States) Buffalo Sabres
24	RW	Corey Perry	1.91 m (6 ft 3 in)	95 kg (209 lb)	May 16, 1985 (aged 31)	(United States) Anaheim Ducks
91	C	Steven Stamkos	1.85 m (6 ft 1 in)	88 kg (194 lb)	February 7, 1990 (aged 26)	(United States) Tampa Bay Lightning
20	C	John Tavares	1.85 m (6 ft 1 in)	93 kg (205 lb)	September 20, 1990 (aged 25)	(United States) New York Islanders
97	C	Joe Thornton	1.93 m (6 ft 4 in)	100 kg (220 lb)	July 2, 1979 (aged 37)	(United States) San Jose Sharks
16	C	Jonathan Toews (A)	1.88 m (6 ft 2 in)	94 kg (207 lb)	April 29, 1988 (aged 28)	(United States) Chicago Blackhawks

Duncan Keith, Jeff Carter, Jamie Benn, and Tyler Seguin were all originally selected, but could not participate due to injury. They were replaced by Jay Bouwmeester, Corey Perry, Logan Couture, and Ryan O'Reilly, respectively.

=== 2016 Men's World Ice Hockey Championship ===
- Head coach: (Alberta) Bill Peters
- Assistant coach: (Prince Edward Island) Dave Cameron
- Assistant coach: (Ontario) Mike Yeo

Goaltender

- (Manitoba) Calvin Pickard – Colorado Avalanche
- (Ontario) Cam Talbot – New York Rangers

Defence

- (Ontario) Cody Ceci – Ottawa Senators
- (Ontario) Ryan Ellis – Nashville Predators
- (Quebec) Mike Matheson – Florida Panthers
- (Ontario) Christopher Tanev – Vancouver Canucks
- (Ontario) Ben Hutton – Vancouver Canucks
- (Saskatchewan) Matt Dumba – Minnesota Wild
- (Saskatchewan) Ryan Murray – Columbus Blue Jackets
- (British Columbia) Morgan Rielly – Toronto Maple Leafs

Forward

- (Alberta) Taylor Hall – Edmonton Oilers
- (Ontario) Matt Duchene (A) – Colorado Avalanche
- (Alberta) Brendan Gallagher – Montreal Canadiens
- (Manitoba) Max Domi – Arizona Coyotes
- (Quebec) Derick Brassard – New York Rangers
- (British Columbia) Sam Reinhart – Buffalo Sabres
- (Ontario) Corey Perry (C) – Anaheim Ducks
- (Ontario) Boone Jenner – Columbus Blue Jackets
- (Ontario) Mark Scheifele – Winnipeg Jets
- (Manitoba) Mark Stone – Ottawa Senators
- (Nova Scotia) Brad Marchand – Boston Bruins
- (Ontario) Ryan O'Reilly (A)– Buffalo Sabres
- (Ontario) Connor McDavid – Edmonton Oilers

=== 2015 Men's World Ice Hockey Championship ===
- Head coach: (Saskatchewan) Todd McLellan
- Assistant coach: (Ontario) Peter DeBoer
- Assistant coach: (Alberta) Bill Peters
- Assistant coach: (Ontario) Jay Woodcroft

Goaltender

- (British Columbia) Martin Jones – Los Angeles Kings
- (Ontario) Mike Smith – Arizona Coyotes

Defence

- (British Columbia) Dan Hamhuis (A) – Vancouver Canucks
- (Ontario) Aaron Ekblad – Florida Panthers
- (Ontario) Jake Muzzin – Los Angeles Kings
- (British Columbia) Tyson Barrie – Colorado Avalanche
- (British Columbia) Patrick Wiercioch – Ottawa Senators
- (Quebec) David Savard – Columbus Blue Jackets
- (Ontario) Brent Burns – San Jose Sharks

Forward

- (Ontario) Tyler Seguin – Dallas Stars
- (Alberta) Taylor Hall – Edmonton Oilers
- (New Brunswick) Sean Couturier – Philadelphia Flyers
- (Ontario) Matt Duchene – Colorado Avalanche
- (Saskatchewan) Brayden Schenn – Philadelphia Flyers
- (Saskatchewan) Jordan Eberle – Edmonton Oilers
- (Manitoba) Cody Eakin – Dallas Stars
- (Ontario) Claude Giroux – Philadelphia Flyers
- (Nova Scotia) Nathan MacKinnon – Colorado Avalanche
- (Alberta) Tyler Ennis – Buffalo Sabres
- (Ontario) Tyler Toffoli – Los Angeles Kings
- (Ontario) Ryan O'Reilly – Colorado Avalanche
- (Nova Scotia) Sidney Crosby (C) – Pittsburgh Penguins
- (Ontario) Jason Spezza (A) – Dallas Stars

=== 2014 Men's World Ice Hockey Championship ===
- Head coach: (Saskatchewan) Dave Tippett
- Assistant coach: (Ontario) Peter DeBoer
- Assistant coach: (Ontario) Paul Maurice

Goaltender

- (Alberta) Ben Scrivens – Edmonton Oilers
- (Manitoba) James Reimer – Toronto Maple Leafs
- (Ontario) Justin Peters – Carolina Hurricanes

Defence

- (Ontario) Marc Methot – Ottawa Senators
- (Ontario) Ryan Ellis – Nashville Predators
- (British Columbia) Jason Garrison – Vancouver Canucks
- (Ontario) Kevin Bieksa – Vancouver Canucks
- (British Columbia) Morgan Rielly – Toronto Maple Leafs
- (Ontario) Erik Gudbranson – Florida Panthers
- (Alberta) Tyler Myers – Buffalo Sabres

Forward

- (British Columbia) Kyle Turris – Ottawa Senators
- (Saskatchewan) Brayden Schenn – Philadelphia Flyers
- (Quebec) Jonathan Huberdeau – Florida Panthers
- (Quebec) Alex Burrows – Vancouver Canucks
- (Ontario) Cody Hodgson – Buffalo Sabres
- (British Columbia) Troy Brouwer – Washington Capitals
- (Ontario) Matt Read – Philadelphia Flyers
- (Ontario) Sean Monahan – Calgary Flames
- (Alberta) Jason Chimera – Washington Capitals
- (Nova Scotia) Nathan MacKinnon – Colorado Avalanche
- (Ontario) Joel Ward – Washington Capitals
- (Ontario) Nazem Kadri – Toronto Maple Leafs
- (Ontario) Mark Scheifele – Winnipeg Jets

=== 2014 Winter Olympics ===
Head coach: Mike Babcock

The following is the Canadian roster for the men's ice hockey tournament at the 2014 Winter Olympics.

No.	Pos.	Name	Height	Weight	Birthdate	Birthplace	2013–14 team
1	G	Roberto Luongo	191 cm (6 ft 3 in)	93 kg (205 lb)	4 April 1979	Montreal, QC	(Canada) Vancouver Canucks (NHL)
2	D	Duncan Keith	183 cm (6 ft 0 in)	85 kg (187 lb)	16 July 1983	Winnipeg, MB	(United States) Chicago Blackhawks (NHL)
5	D	Dan Hamhuis	185 cm (6 ft 1 in)	95 kg (209 lb)	13 December 1982	Smithers, BC	(Canada) Vancouver Canucks (NHL)
6	D	Shea Weber – A	191 cm (6 ft 3 in)	97 kg (214 lb)	14 August 1985	Sicamous, BC	(United States) Nashville Predators (NHL)
8	D	Drew Doughty	185 cm (6 ft 1 in)	92 kg (203 lb)	8 December 1989	London, ON	(United States) Los Angeles Kings (NHL)
9	F	Matt Duchene	180 cm (5 ft 11 in)	91 kg (201 lb)	16 January 1991	Haliburton, ON	(United States) Colorado Avalanche (NHL)
10	F	Patrick Sharp	185 cm (6 ft 1 in)	89 kg (196 lb)	27 December 1981	Winnipeg, MB	(United States) Chicago Blackhawks (NHL)
12	F	Patrick Marleau	188 cm (6 ft 2 in)	100 kg (220 lb)	15 December 1979	Aneroid, SK	(United States) San Jose Sharks (NHL)
14	F	Chris Kunitz	183 cm (6 ft 0 in)	90 kg (200 lb)	26 September 1979	Regina, SK	(United States) Pittsburgh Penguins (NHL)
15	F	Ryan Getzlaf	193 cm (6 ft 4 in)	100 kg (220 lb)	10 May 1985	Regina, SK	(United States) Anaheim Ducks (NHL)
16	F	Jonathan Toews – A	188 cm (6 ft 2 in)	96 kg (212 lb)	29 April 1988	Winnipeg, MB	(United States) Chicago Blackhawks (NHL)
19	D	Jay Bouwmeester	193 cm (6 ft 4 in)	98 kg (216 lb)	27 September 1983	Edmonton, AB	(United States) St. Louis Blues (NHL)
20	F	John Tavares	183 cm (6 ft 0 in)	90 kg (200 lb)	20 September 1990	Mississauga, ON	(United States) New York Islanders (NHL)
22	F	Jamie Benn	188 cm (6 ft 2 in)	93 kg (205 lb)	18 July 1989	Victoria, BC	(United States) Dallas Stars (NHL)
24	F	Corey Perry	191 cm (6 ft 3 in)	95 kg (209 lb)	16 May 1985	Peterborough, ON	(United States) Anaheim Ducks (NHL)
26	F	Martin St. Louis	172 cm (5 ft 8 in)	82 kg (181 lb)	18 June 1975	Laval, QC	(United States) Tampa Bay Lightning (NHL)
27	D	Alex Pietrangelo	191 cm (6 ft 3 in)	93 kg (205 lb)	10 October 1990	King City, ON	(United States) St. Louis Blues (NHL)
31	G	Carey Price	190 cm (6 ft 3 in)	99 kg (218 lb)	16 August 1987	Vancouver, BC	(Canada) Montreal Canadiens (NHL)
37	F	Patrice Bergeron	188 cm (6 ft 2 in)	88 kg (194 lb)	24 July 1985	L'Ancienne-Lorette, QC	(United States) Boston Bruins (NHL)
41	G	Mike Smith	191 cm (6 ft 3 in)	98 kg (216 lb)	22 March 1982	Kingston, ON	(United States) Phoenix Coyotes (NHL)
44	D	Marc-Édouard Vlasic	185 cm (6 ft 1 in)	91 kg (201 lb)	30 March 1987	Montreal, QC	(United States) San Jose Sharks (NHL)
61	F	Rick Nash	193 cm (6 ft 4 in)	99 kg (218 lb)	16 June 1984	Brampton, ON	(United States) New York Rangers (NHL)
76	D	P. K. Subban	183 cm (6 ft 0 in)	98 kg (216 lb)	13 May 1989	Toronto, ON	(Canada) Montreal Canadiens (NHL)
77	F	Jeff Carter	193 cm (6 ft 4 in)	95 kg (209 lb)	1 January 1985	London, ON	(United States) Los Angeles Kings (NHL)
87	F	Sidney Crosby – C	180 cm (5 ft 11 in)	90 kg (200 lb)	7 August 1987	Cole Harbour, NS	(United States) Pittsburgh Penguins (NHL)

Forward Steven Stamkos was also selected but was unable to participate due to injury. He was replaced by Martin St. Louis.

=== 2013 Men's World Ice Hockey Championship ===
- Head coach: (Alberta) Lindy Ruff
- Assistant coach: (Ontario) Doug Shedden
- Assistant coach: (Saskatchewan) Dave Tippett
- Assistant coach: (Manitoba) Barry Trotz

Goaltender

- (Saskatchewan) Devan Dubnyk – Edmonton Oilers
- (Saskatchewan) Michael Garnett – Traktor Chelyabinsk
- (Ontario) Mike Smith – Phoenix Coyotes

Defence

- (Ontario) T. J. Brodie – Calgary Flames
- (Ontario) Brian Campbell – Florida Panthers
- (British Columbia) Brenden Dillon – Dallas Stars
- (British Columbia) Dan Hamhuis – Vancouver Canucks
- (Ontario) Jay Harrison – Carolina Hurricanes
- (Quebec) Stéphane Robidas (A) – Dallas Stars
- (Saskatchewan) Luke Schenn – Philadelphia Flyers
- (British Columbia) Justin Schultz – Edmonton Oilers
- (Ontario) P. K. Subban – Montreal Canadiens

Forward

- (Ontario) Matt Duchene – Colorado Avalanche
- (Saskatchewan) Jordan Eberle – Edmonton Oilers
- (Ontario) Claude Giroux – Philadelphia Flyers
- (Alberta) Taylor Hall – Edmonton Oilers
- (British Columbia) Andrew Ladd (A) – Winnipeg Jets
- (Ontario) Ryan O'Reilly – Colorado Avalanche
- (Alberta) Matt Read – Philadelphia Flyers
- (Saskatchewan) Jaden Schwartz – St. Louis Blues
- (Ontario) Wayne Simmonds – Philadelphia Flyers
- (Ontario) Jeff Skinner – Carolina Hurricanes
- (Ontario) Eric Staal (C) – Carolina Hurricanes
- (Ontario) Jordan Staal – Carolina Hurricanes
- (Quebec) Martin St. Louis – Tampa Bay Lightning

=== 2012 Men's World Ice Hockey Championship ===
- Head coach: (Alberta) Brent Sutter
- Assistant coach: (Ontario) Kirk Muller
- Assistant coach: (Quebec) Guy Boucher

Goaltender

- (Saskatchewan) Devan Dubnyk – Edmonton Oilers
- (Ontario) Matt Hackett – Minnesota Wild
- (Saskatchewan) Cam Ward – Carolina Hurricanes

Defence

- (Alberta) Jay Bouwmeester – Calgary Flames
- (Ontario) Marc Methot – Columbus Blue Jackets
- (Manitoba) Duncan Keith – Chicago Blackhawks
- (Saskatchewan) Ryan Murray – Everett Silvertips
- (Alberta) Dion Phaneuf – Toronto Maple Leafs
- (Ontario) Kyle Quincey – Detroit Red Wings
- (Saskatchewan) Luke Schenn – Toronto Maple Leafs
- (Ontario) P. K. Subban – Montreal Canadiens
- (Quebec) Marc–Édouard Vlasic – San Jose Sharks

Forward

- (British Columbia) Jamie Benn – Dallas Stars
- (Quebec) Alexandre Burrows (A) – Vancouver Canucks
- (Saskatchewan) Jordan Eberle – Edmonton Oilers
- (Saskatchewan) Ryan Getzlaf (C) – Anaheim Ducks
- (British Columbia) Evander Kane – Winnipeg Jets
- (British Columbia) Andrew Ladd – Winnipeg Jets
- (British Columbia) Ryan Nugent–Hopkins – Edmonton Oilers
- (Ontario) Ryan O'Reilly – Colorado Avalanche
- (Ontario) Corey Perry – Anaheim Ducks
- (Newfoundland and Labrador) Teddy Purcell – Tampa Bay Lightning
- (Ontario) John Tavares – New York Islanders
- (Manitoba) Patrick Sharp (A) – Chicago Blackhawks
- (Ontario) Jeff Skinner – Carolina Hurricanes

=== 2011 Men's World Ice Hockey Championship ===
- Head coach: (Alberta) Ken Hitchcock
- Assistant coach: (Ontario) Scott Arniel
- Assistant coach: (Ontario) Peter DeBoer

Goaltender

- (Quebec) Jonathan Bernier – Los Angeles Kings
- (Saskatchewan) Devan Dubnyk – Edmonton Oilers
- (Manitoba) James Reimer – Toronto Maple Leafs

Defence

- (Ontario) Brent Burns – San Jose Sharks
- (Ontario) Carlo Colaiacovo – St. Louis Blues
- (Quebec) Marc–André Gragnani – Buffalo Sabres
- (Ontario) Marc Methot – Columbus Blue Jackets
- (Alberta) Dion Phaneuf (A) – Toronto Maple Leafs
- (Ontario) Alex Pietrangelo – St. Louis Blues
- (Quebec) Mario Scalzo – Adler Mannheim
- (Saskatchewan) Luke Schenn – Toronto Maple Leafs

Forward

- (Ontario) Cal Clutterbuck – Minnesota Wild
- (Ontario) Matt Duchene – Colorado Avalanche
- (Saskatchewan) Jordan Eberle – Edmonton Oilers
- (British Columbia) Evander Kane – Winnipeg Jets
- (British Columbia) Andrew Ladd (A) – Winnipeg Jets
- (Ontario) Rick Nash (C) – Columbus Blue Jackets
- (Ontario) James Neal – Dallas Stars
- (Ontario) Jason Spezza (A) – Ottawa Senators
- (Ontario) John Tavares – New York Islanders
- (Ontario) Jeff Skinner – Carolina Hurricanes
- (Ontario) Chris Stewart – St. Louis Blues
- (Quebec) Antoine Vermette – Phoenix Coyotes
- (Manitoba) Travis Zajac (A) – New Jersey Devils

=== 2010 Men's World Ice Hockey Championship ===
- Head coach: (Ontario) Craig MacTavish
- Assistant coach: (Ontario) Peter DeBoer
- Assistant coach: (Alberta) Billy Moores

Goaltender

- (Saskatchewan) Devan Dubnyk – Edmonton Oilers
- (Alberta) Chad Johnson – New York Rangers
- (Alberta) Chris Mason – St. Louis Blues

Defence

- (Quebec) François Beauchemin – Toronto Maple Leafs
- (Ontario) Brent Burns – Minnesota Wild
- (British Columbia) Kyle Cumiskey – Colorado Avalanche
- (Ontario) Michael Del Zotto – New York Rangers
- (Ontario) Mark Giordano – Calgary Flames
- (Alberta) Tyler Myers – Buffalo Sabres
- (Alberta) Kris Russell – Columbus Blue Jackets
- (Ontario) Marc Staal – New York Rangers

Forward

- (Alberta) Rene Bourque – Calgary Flames
- (Ontario) Steve Downie – Tampa Bay Lightning
- (Ontario) Matt Duchene – Colorado Avalanche
- (Saskatchewan) Jordan Eberle – Regina Pats
- (British Columbia) Evander Kane – Atlanta Thrashers
- (Saskatchewan) Brooks Laich – Washington Capitals
- (Prince Edward Island) Steve Ott – Dallas Stars
- (Ontario) Corey Perry – Anaheim Ducks
- (Alberta) Mason Raymond – Vancouver Canucks
- (Ontario) Rich Peverley – Atlanta Thrashers
- (Alberta) Ryan Smyth – Los Angeles Kings
- (Ontario) Steven Stamkos – Tampa Bay Lightning
- (Ontario) John Tavares – New York Islanders
- (Alberta) Ray Whitney – Carolina Hurricanes

=== 2010 Winter Olympics ===
Head coach: Mike Babcock

The following is the Canadian roster in the men's ice hockey tournament of the 2010 Winter Olympics.

No.	Pos.	Name	Height	Weight	Birthdate	Birthplace	2009–10 team
30	G	Martin Brodeur	188 cm (6 ft 2 in)	98 kg (216 lb)	6 May 1972	Montreal, QC	(United States) New Jersey Devils (NHL)
29	G	Marc-André Fleury	188 cm (6 ft 2 in)	82 kg (181 lb)	28 November 1984	Sorel-Tracy, QC	(United States) Pittsburgh Penguins (NHL)
1	G	Roberto Luongo	191 cm (6 ft 3 in)	93 kg (205 lb)	4 April 1979	Montreal, QC	(Canada) Vancouver Canucks (NHL)
22	D	Dan Boyle	180 cm (5 ft 11 in)	86 kg (190 lb)	12 July 1976	Ottawa, ON	(United States) San Jose Sharks (NHL)
8	D	Drew Doughty	185 cm (6 ft 1 in)	92 kg (203 lb)	8 December 1989	London, ON	(United States) Los Angeles Kings (NHL)
2	D	Duncan Keith	183 cm (6 ft 0 in)	85 kg (187 lb)	16 July 1983	Winnipeg, MB	(United States) Chicago Blackhawks (NHL)
27	D	Scott Niedermayer – C	185 cm (6 ft 1 in)	91 kg (201 lb)	31 August 1973	Cranbrook, BC	(United States) Anaheim Ducks (NHL)
20	D	Chris Pronger – A	198 cm (6 ft 6 in)	101 kg (223 lb)	10 October 1974	Dryden, ON	(United States) Philadelphia Flyers (NHL)
7	D	Brent Seabrook	191 cm (6 ft 3 in)	100 kg (220 lb)	20 April 1985	Richmond, BC	(United States) Chicago Blackhawks (NHL)
6	D	Shea Weber	193 cm (6 ft 4 in)	103 kg (227 lb)	14 August 1985	Sicamous, BC	(United States) Nashville Predators (NHL)
37	F	Patrice Bergeron	188 cm (6 ft 2 in)	88 kg (194 lb)	24 July 1985	L'Ancienne-Lorette, QC	(United States) Boston Bruins (NHL)
87	F	Sidney Crosby – A	180 cm (5 ft 11 in)	90 kg (200 lb)	7 August 1987	Cole Harbour, NS	(United States) Pittsburgh Penguins (NHL)
51	F	Ryan Getzlaf	193 cm (6 ft 4 in)	100 kg (220 lb)	10 May 1985	Regina, SK	(United States) Anaheim Ducks (NHL)
15	F	Dany Heatley	191 cm (6 ft 3 in)	100 kg (220 lb)	21 January 1981	Freiburg im Breisgau, West Germany	(United States) San Jose Sharks (NHL)
12	F	Jarome Iginla – A	185 cm (6 ft 1 in)	95 kg (209 lb)	1 July 1977	Edmonton, AB	(Canada) Calgary Flames (NHL)
11	F	Patrick Marleau	188 cm (6 ft 2 in)	100 kg (220 lb)	15 September 1979	Swift Current, SK	(United States) San Jose Sharks (NHL)
10	F	Brenden Morrow	180 cm (5 ft 11 in)	95 kg (209 lb)	16 January 1979	Carlyle, SK	(United States) Dallas Stars (NHL)
61	F	Rick Nash	193 cm (6 ft 4 in)	99 kg (218 lb)	16 June 1984	Brampton, ON	(United States) Columbus Blue Jackets (NHL)
18	F	Mike Richards	180 cm (5 ft 11 in)	91 kg (201 lb)	11 February 1985	Kenora, ON	(United States) Philadelphia Flyers (NHL)
24	F	Corey Perry	191 cm (6 ft 3 in)	95 kg (209 lb)	16 May 1985	Peterborough, ON	(United States) Anaheim Ducks (NHL)
21	F	Eric Staal	193 cm (6 ft 4 in)	93 kg (205 lb)	29 October 1984	Thunder Bay, ON	(United States) Carolina Hurricanes (NHL)
19	F	Joe Thornton	193 cm (6 ft 4 in)	107 kg (236 lb)	2 July 1979	London, ON	(United States) San Jose Sharks (NHL)
16	F	Jonathan Toews	188 cm (6 ft 2 in)	96 kg (212 lb)	29 April 1988	Winnipeg, MB	(United States) Chicago Blackhawks (NHL)

Defencemen Jay Bouwmeester and Stéphane Robidas, forwards Jeff Carter, Steven Stamkos and Martin St. Louis, and goaltender Chris Mason were selected as reserves in case of injury during the tournament.

=== 2009 Men's World Ice Hockey Championship ===
- Head coach: Lindy Ruff

Goaltender

- Josh Harding – Minnesota Wild
- Chris Mason – St. Louis Blues
- Dwayne Roloson – Edmonton Oilers

Defence

- Braydon Coburn – Philadelphia Flyers
- Drew Doughty – Los Angeles Kings
- Dan Hamhuis – Nashville Predators
- Joel Kwiatkowski – Severstal Cherepovets
- Chris Phillips – Ottawa Senators
- Luke Schenn – Toronto Maple Leafs
- Shea Weber – Nashville Predators
- Ian White – Toronto Maple Leafs
- Marc–Édouard Vlasic – San Jose Sharks

Forward

- Colby Armstrong – Atlanta Thrashers
- Shane Doan (C) – Phoenix Coyotes
- Mike Fisher – Ottawa Senators
- Dany Heatley – Ottawa Senators
- Shawn Horcoff – Edmonton Oilers
- Matthew Lombardi – Phoenix Coyotes
- James Neal – Dallas Stars
- Derek Roy – Buffalo Sabres
- Martin St. Louis – Tampa Bay Lightning
- Jason Spezza – Ottawa Senators
- Steven Stamkos – Tampa Bay Lightning
- Scottie Upshall – Phoenix Coyotes
- Travis Zajac – New Jersey Devils

=== 2008 Men's World Ice Hockey Championship ===
- Head coach: Ken Hitchcock

Goaltender

- Mathieu Garon – Edmonton Oilers
- Pascal Leclaire – Columbus Blue Jackets
- Cam Ward – Carolina Hurricanes

Defence

- Jay Bouwmeester – Florida Panthers
- Brent Burns – Minnesota Wild
- Mark Giordano – Dynamo Moscow
- Mike Green – Washington Capitals
- Dan Hamhuis – Nashville Predators
- Ed Jovanovski – Phoenix Coyotes
- Duncan Keith – Chicago Blackhawks
- Steve Staios – Edmonton Oilers

Forward

- Jason Chimera – Columbus Blue Jackets
- Shane Doan – Phoenix Coyotes
- Sam Gagner – Edmonton Oilers
- Ryan Getzlaf – Anaheim Ducks
- Dany Heatley – Ottawa Senators
- Chris Kunitz – Anaheim Ducks
- Jamal Mayers – St. Louis Blues
- Rick Nash – Columbus Blue Jackets
- Derek Roy – Buffalo Sabres
- Patrick Sharp – Chicago Blackhawks
- Jason Spezza – Ottawa Senators
- Martin St. Louis – Tampa Bay Lightning
- Eric Staal – Carolina Hurricanes
- Jonathan Toews – Chicago Blackhawks

=== 2007 Men's World Ice Hockey Championship ===
- Head coach: Andy Murray

Goaltenders

- 30 Cam Ward – Carolina Hurricanes
- 50 Dwayne Roloson – Edmonton Oilers

Defencemen

- 2 Dan Hamhuis – Nashville Predators
- 3 Dion Phaneuf – Calgary Flames
- 4 Eric Brewer (A) – St. Louis Blues
- 5 Barret Jackman – St. Louis Blues
- 6 Shea Weber – Nashville Predators
- 23 Cory Murphy – HIFK
- 55 Nick Schultz (A) – Minnesota Wild

Forwards

- 9 Jay McClement – St. Louis Blues
- 10 Jordan Staal – Pittsburgh Penguins
- 11 Justin Williams – Carolina Hurricanes
- 12 Eric Staal – Carolina Hurricanes
- 13 Michael Cammalleri (A) – Los Angeles Kings
- 16 Jonathan Toews – University of North Dakota
- 18 Matthew Lombardi – Calgary Flames
- 21 Shane Doan (C) – Phoenix Coyotes
- 20 Colby Armstrong – Pittsburgh Penguins
- 21 Jamal Mayers – St. Louis Blues
- 25 Jason Chimera – Columbus Blue Jackets
- 61 Rick Nash – Columbus Blue Jackets

=== 2006 Men's World Ice Hockey Championship ===
- Head coach: Marc Habscheid

Goaltenders

- 35 Alex Auld – Vancouver Canucks
- 30 Marc Denis – Columbus Blue Jackets

Defencemen

- 16 Trevor Daley – Dallas Stars
- 25 Micki DuPont – Eisbären Berlin
- 2 Dan Hamhuis – Nashville Predators
- 3 Stéphane Robidas (A) – Dallas Stars
- 55 Nick Schultz – Minnesota Wild
- 5 Brent Seabrook – Chicago Blackhawks
- 6 Brad Stuart – Boston Bruins

Forwards

- 37 Patrice Bergeron – Boston Bruins
- 26 Brad Boyes – Boston Bruins
- 19 Kyle Calder (A) – Chicago Blackhawks
- 13 Michael Cammalleri – Los Angeles Kings
- 7 Jeff Carter – Philadelphia Flyers
- 89 Mike Comrie – Phoenix Coyotes
- 87 Sidney Crosby (A) – Pittsburgh Penguins
- 17 Scott Hartnell – Nashville Predators
- 12 Glen Metropolit – HC Lugano
- 27 Matt Pettinger – Washington Capitals
- 18 Mike Richards – Philadelphia Flyers
- 14 Brendan Shanahan (C) – Detroit Red Wings
- 29 Jason Williams – Detroit Red Wings

=== 2006 Winter Olympics ===
Head coach: Pat Quinn

The following is the Canadian roster for the men's ice hockey tournament at the 2006 Winter Olympics.

Head coach: Pat Quinn

Assistant coaches: Wayne Fleming, Marc Habscheid, Ken Hitchcock, Jacques Martin

No.	Pos.	Name	Height	Weight	Birthdate	Team
1	G	Roberto Luongo	191 cm (6 ft 3 in)	93 kg (205 lb)	April 19, 1979 (aged 26)	(United States) Florida Panthers
3	D	Jay Bouwmeester	193 cm (6 ft 4 in)	88 kg (194 lb)	September 7, 1983 (aged 22)	(United States) Florida Panthers
4	D	Rob Blake (A)	193 cm (6 ft 4 in)	102 kg (225 lb)	December 10, 1969 (aged 36)	(United States) Colorado Avalanche
6	D	Wade Redden	188 cm (6 ft 2 in)	95 kg (209 lb)	June 12, 1977 (aged 28)	(Canada) Ottawa Senators
9	F	Shane Doan	188 cm (6 ft 2 in)	98 kg (216 lb)	October 10, 1976 (aged 29)	(United States) Phoenix Coyotes
12	F	Jarome Iginla (A)	185 cm (6 ft 1 in)	95 kg (209 lb)	July 1, 1977 (aged 28)	(Canada) Calgary Flames
14	F	Todd Bertuzzi	191 cm (6 ft 3 in)	111 kg (245 lb)	February 2, 1975 (aged 31)	(Canada) Vancouver Canucks
15	F	Dany Heatley	191 cm (6 ft 3 in)	98 kg (216 lb)	January 21, 1981 (aged 25)	(Canada) Ottawa Senators
21	F	Simon Gagné (A)	183 cm (6 ft 0 in)	84 kg (185 lb)	February 29, 1980 (aged 25)	(United States) Philadelphia Flyers
24	D	Bryan McCabe	188 cm (6 ft 2 in)	100 kg (220 lb)	June 8, 1975 (aged 30)	(Canada) Toronto Maple Leafs
26	F	Martin St. Louis	175 cm (5 ft 9 in)	84 kg (185 lb)	June 18, 1975 (aged 30)	(United States) Tampa Bay Lightning
28	D	Robyn Regehr	191 cm (6 ft 3 in)	102 kg (225 lb)	April 19, 1980 (aged 25)	(Canada) Calgary Flames
30	G	Martin Brodeur	188 cm (6 ft 2 in)	95 kg (209 lb)	May 6, 1972 (aged 33)	(United States) New Jersey Devils
33	F	Kris Draper	178 cm (5 ft 10 in)	86 kg (190 lb)	May 24, 1971 (aged 34)	(United States) Detroit Red Wings
35	G	Marty Turco	180 cm (5 ft 11 in)	83 kg (183 lb)	August 13, 1975 (aged 30)	(United States) Dallas Stars
39	F	Brad Richards	185 cm (6 ft 1 in)	90 kg (200 lb)	May 2, 1980 (aged 25)	(United States) Tampa Bay Lightning
40	F	Vincent Lecavalier	193 cm (6 ft 4 in)	93 kg (205 lb)	April 21, 1980 (aged 25)	(United States) Tampa Bay Lightning
44	D	Chris Pronger (A)	198 cm (6 ft 6 in)	100 kg (220 lb)	October 10, 1974 (aged 31)	(Canada) Edmonton Oilers
52	D	Adam Foote	188 cm (6 ft 2 in)	98 kg (216 lb)	July 10, 1971 (aged 34)	(United States) Columbus Blue Jackets
61	F	Rick Nash	193 cm (6 ft 4 in)	93 kg (205 lb)	June 16, 1984 (aged 21)	(United States) Columbus Blue Jackets
91	F	Joe Sakic (C)	180 cm (5 ft 11 in)	88 kg (194 lb)	July 7, 1969 (aged 36)	(United States) Colorado Avalanche
94	F	Ryan Smyth	185 cm (6 ft 1 in)	86 kg (190 lb)	February 21, 1976 (aged 29)	(Canada) Edmonton Oilers
97	F	Joe Thornton	193 cm (6 ft 4 in)	102 kg (225 lb)	July 2, 1979 (aged 26)	(United States) San Jose Sharks

Defencemen Scott Niedermayer and Ed Jovanovski were originally selected, but due to injuries were replaced by Jay Bouwmeester and Bryan McCabe, respectively. Dan Boyle took McCabe's previous spot as a reserve. Defenceman Dan Boyle and forwards Jason Spezza and Eric Staal were selected as "reserves" in case of injury before the tournament began.

=== 2005 Men's World Ice Hockey Championship ===
- Head coach: Marc Habscheid
- Dan Boyle – Tampa Bay Lightning
- Martin Brodeur – New Jersey Devils
- Shane Doan – Phoenix Coyotes
- Kris Draper – Detroit Red Wings
- Mike Fisher – Ottawa Senators
- Simon Gagné – Philadelphia Flyers
- Scott Hannan – San Jose Sharks
- Dany Heatley – Atlanta Thrashers
- Ed Jovanovski (A) – Vancouver Canucks
- Roberto Luongo – Florida Panthers
- Kirk Maltby – Detroit Red Wings
- Patrick Marleau (A) – San Jose Sharks
- Brendan Morrison – Vancouver Canucks
- Brenden Morrow – Dallas Stars
- Rick Nash – Columbus Blue Jackets
- Chris Phillips – Ottawa Senators
- Wade Redden – Ottawa Senators
- Robyn Regehr – Calgary Flames
- Ryan Smyth (C) – Edmonton Oilers
- Sheldon Souray – Montreal Canadiens
- Joe Thornton (A) – Boston Bruins
- Jordin Tootoo – Nashville Predators
- Marty Turco – Dallas Stars
- Scott Walker – Nashville Predators

=== 2004 World Cup of Hockey ===
- Head coach: Pat Quinn
- Rob Blake (A) – Colorado Avalanche
- Jay Bouwmeester – Florida Panthers
- Eric Brewer – Edmonton Oilers
- Martin Brodeur – New Jersey Devils
- Shane Doan – Phoenix Coyotes
- Kris Draper – Detroit Red Wings
- Scott Hannan – San Jose Sharks
- Adam Foote (A) – Colorado Avalanche
- Simon Gagné – Philadelphia Flyers
- Dany Heatley – Atlanta Thrashers
- Jarome Iginla (A) – Calgary Flames
- Ed Jovanovski – Vancouver Canucks
- Mario Lemieux (C) – Pittsburgh Penguins
- Roberto Luongo – Florida Panthers
- Kirk Maltby – Detroit Red Wings
- Patrick Marleau – San Jose Sharks
- Brenden Morrow – Dallas Stars
- Scott Niedermayer – New Jersey Devils
- Wade Redden – Ottawa Senators
- Robyn Regehr – Calgary Flames
- Brad Richards – Tampa Bay Lightning
- Joe Sakic (A) – Colorado Avalanche
- Ryan Smyth – Edmonton Oilers
- Martin St. Louis – Tampa Bay Lightning
- José Théodore – Montreal Canadiens
- Joe Thornton – Boston Bruins
- Vincent Lecavalier – Tampa Bay Lightning

=== 2004 Men's World Ice Hockey Championship ===
- Head coach: Mike Babcock
- Patrice Bergeron – Boston Bruins
- Jay Bouwmeester – Florida Panthers
- Daniel Brière – Buffalo Sabres
- Eric Brewer – Edmonton Oilers
- Matt Cooke – Vancouver Canucks
- Marc Denis – Columbus Blue Jackets
- J. P. Dumont – Buffalo Sabres
- Jean–Sébastien Giguère – Mighty Ducks of Anaheim
- Jeff Friesen – New Jersey Devils
- Dany Heatley – Atlanta Thrashers
- Shawn Horcoff – Edmonton Oilers
- Roberto Luongo – Florida Panthers
- Willie Mitchell – Minnesota Wild
- Derek Morris – Colorado Avalanche
- Brendan Morrison – Vancouver Canucks
- Brenden Morrow – Dallas Stars
- Glen Murray – Boston Bruins
- Rob Niedermayer – Mighty Ducks of Anaheim
- Scott Niedermayer – New Jersey Devils
- Nick Schultz – Minnesota Wild
- Ryan Smyth (C) – Edmonton Oilers
- Steve Staios – Edmonton Oilers
- Justin Williams – Philadelphia Flyers

=== 2003 Men's World Ice Hockey Championship ===
- Head coach: Andy Murray
- Martin Biron – Buffalo Sabres
- Jay Bouwmeester – Florida Panthers
- Daniel Brière – Phoenix Coyotes
- Eric Brewer – Edmonton Oilers
- Sean Burke – Phoenix Coyotes
- Kyle Calder – Chicago Blackhawks
- Anson Carter – New York Rangers
- Mike Comrie – Edmonton Oilers
- Mathieu Dandenault – Detroit Red Wings
- Shane Doan – Phoenix Coyotes
- Kris Draper – Detroit Red Wings
- Dany Heatley – Atlanta Thrashers
- Jamie Heward – Genève–Servette HC
- Shawn Horcoff – Edmonton Oilers
- Krys Kolanos – Phoenix Coyotes
- Roberto Luongo– Florida Panthers
- Patrick Marleau – San Jose Sharks
- Kirk Maltby – Detroit Red Wings
- Craig Rivet – Montreal Canadiens
- Ryan Smyth (C) – Edmonton Oilers
- Steve Staios – Edmonton Oilers

=== 2002 Men's World Ice Hockey Championship ===
- Head coach: Wayne Fleming
- Eric Brewer
- Kyle Calder
- Dan Cleary
- Mike Comrie
- Brad Ference
- Jean–Sébastien Giguère
- Dany Heatley
- Manny Malhotra
- Richard Matvichuk
- Andy McDonald
- Dan McGillis
- Brenden Morrow
- James Patrick
- Jamie Ram
- Peter Schaefer
- Brad Schlegel
- Ryan Smyth (C)
- Steve Staios
- Jamie Storr
- Darryl Sydor
- Marty Turco
- Ray Whitney
- Justin Williams
- Jamie Wright
- Tyler Wright

=== 2002 Winter Olympics ===
- Head coach: Pat Quinn
- Ed Belfour – Dallas Stars
- Rob Blake – Colorado Avalanche
- Eric Brewer – Edmonton Oilers
- Martin Brodeur – New Jersey Devils
- Theoren Fleury – New York Rangers
- Adam Foote – Colorado Avalanche
- Simon Gagné – Philadelphia Flyers
- Jarome Iginla – Calgary Flames
- Curtis Joseph – Toronto Maple Leafs
- Ed Jovanovski – Vancouver Canucks
- Paul Kariya – Mighty Ducks of Anaheim
- Mario Lemieux (C) – Pittsburgh Penguins
- Eric Lindros – New York Rangers
- Al MacInnis – St. Louis Blues
- Scott Niedermayer – New Jersey Devils
- Joe Nieuwendyk – Dallas Stars
- Owen Nolan – San Jose Sharks
- Michael Peca (A) – New York Islanders
- Chris Pronger (A) – St. Louis Blues
- Joe Sakic (A) – Colorado Avalanche
- Brendan Shanahan – Detroit Red Wings
- Ryan Smyth – Edmonton Oilers
- Steve Yzerman (A) – Detroit Red Wings

=== 2001 Men's World Ice Hockey Championship ===
- Head coach: Wayne Fleming
- Fred Brathwaite
- Eric Brewer
- Dan Cloutier
- Kris Draper
- Jeff Friesen
- Jean–Sébastien Giguère
- Brad Isbister
- Vincent Lecavalier
- Roberto Luongo
- Patrick Marleau
- Daniel Marois
- Kyle McLaren
- Derek Morris
- Brenden Morrow
- Rem Murray
- Michael Peca (C)
- Wade Redden
- Brad Richards
- Stéphane Robidas
- Jason Smith
- Ryan Smyth (C)
- Brad Stuart
- Steve Sullivan
- Joe Thornton
- Scott Walker
- Wes Walz

=== 2000 Men's World Ice Hockey Championship ===
- Head coach: Tom Renney
- Peter Allen
- Adrian Aucoin
- Todd Bertuzzi
- Fred Brathwaite
- Curtis Brown
- Kris Draper
- Jeff Finley
- Brad Isbister
- Mike Johnson
- Ed Jovanovski
- Martin Lapointe
- Trevor Letowski
- Jamal Mayers
- Dean McAmmond
- Brendan Morrison
- Larry Murphy
- Chris Phillips
- Jamie Ram
- Robyn Regehr
- Peter Schaefer
- Mike Sillinger (C)
- Ryan Smyth
- Steve Sullivan
- José Théodore
- Patrick Traverse
- Yannick Tremblay

=== 1999 Men's World Ice Hockey Championship ===
- Head coach: Mike Johnston
- Rob Blake (C)
- Doug Bodger
- Fred Brathwaite
- Éric Dazé
- Shane Doan
- Jeff Friesen
- Adam Graves
- Claude Lapointe
- Patrick Marleau
- Bryan McCabe
- Derek Morris
- Rob Niedermayer
- Sean O'Donnell
- Stéphane Quintal
- Wade Redden
- Brian Savage
- Ryan Smyth
- Cory Stillman
- Chris Szysky
- Rick Tabaracci
- Scott Thornton
- Ron Tugnutt
- Scott Walker
- Ray Whitney

=== 1998 Men's World Ice Hockey Championship ===
- Head coach: Andy Murray
- Todd Bertuzzi
- Rob Blake
- Christian Bronsard
- Cory Cross
- Éric Dazé
- Mickey Elick
- Nelson Emerson
- Martin Gélinas
- Chris Gratton
- Travis Green
- Jeff Hackett
- Ed Jovanovski
- Trevor Linden
- Bryan McCabe
- Gord Murphy
- Glen Murray
- James Patrick
- Félix Potvin
- Keith Primeau (C)
- Steve Rucchin
- Ray Whitney
- Rob Zamuner

=== 1998 Winter Olympics ===
- Head coach: Marc Crawford
- Rob Blake – Los Angeles Kings
- Ray Bourque – Boston Bruins
- Rod Brind'Amour – Philadelphia Flyers
- Martin Brodeur – New Jersey Devils
- Shayne Corson – Montreal Canadiens
- Éric Desjardins – Philadelphia Flyers
- Theoren Fleury – Calgary Flames
- Adam Foote – Colorado Avalanche
- Wayne Gretzky – New York Rangers
- Curtis Joseph – Edmonton Oilers
- Trevor Linden – New York Islanders
- Eric Lindros (C) – Philadelphia Flyers
- Al MacInnis – St. Louis Blues
- Joe Nieuwendyk – Dallas Stars
- Keith Primeau – Carolina Hurricanes
- Chris Pronger – St. Louis Blues
- Mark Recchi – Montreal Canadiens
- Patrick Roy – Colorado Avalanche
- Joe Sakic (A) – Colorado Avalanche
- Brendan Shanahan – Detroit Red Wings
- Scott Stevens (A) – New Jersey Devils
- Steve Yzerman (A) – Detroit Red Wings
- Rob Zamuner– Tampa Bay Lightning

=== 1997 Men's World Ice Hockey Championship ===
- Head coach: Andy Murray
- Rob Blake – Los Angeles Kings
- Joel Bouchard – Calgary Flames
- Sean Burke – Hartford Whalers
- Anson Carter – Boston Bruins
- Steve Chiasson – Hartford Whalers
- Cory Cross – Tampa Bay Lightning
- Shean Donovan – San Jose Sharks
- Bob Errey – San Jose Sharks
- Dean Evason (C) – Canadian National Team
- Éric Fichaud – New York Islanders
- Jeff Friesen – San Jose Sharks
- Chris Gratton – Tampa Bay Lightning
- Travis Green – New York Islanders
- Jarome Iginla – Calgary Flames
- Bryan McCabe – New York Islanders
- Owen Nolan – San Jose Sharks
- Keith Primeau – Hartford Whalers
- Chris Pronger – St. Louis Blues
- Mark Recchi – Montreal Canadiens
- Geoff Sanderson – Hartford Whalers
- Don Sweeney – Boston Bruins
- Rick Tabaracci – Tampa Bay Lightning
- Rob Zamuner – Tampa Bay Lightning

=== 1996 World Cup of Hockey ===
Head coach: Glen Sather

Goaltender

- Martin Brodeur – New Jersey Devils
- Curtis Joseph – Edmonton Oilers
- Bill Ranford – Boston Bruins

Defence

- Rob Blake – Los Angeles Kings
- Paul Coffey – Detroit Red Wings
- Sylvain Côté – Washington Capitals
- Éric Desjardins – Philadelphia Flyers
- Adam Foote – Colorado Avalanche
- Scott Niedermayer – New Jersey Devils
- Lyle Odelein – Montreal Canadiens
- Scott Stevens – New Jersey Devils
- Ed Jovanovski (A – did not play) – Florida Panthers

Forward

- Rod Brind'Amour – Philadelphia Flyers
- Vincent Damphousse – Montreal Canadiens
- Theo Fleury – Calgary Flames
- Adam Graves – New York Rangers
- Wayne Gretzky (C) – New York Rangers
- Claude Lemieux – Colorado Avalanche
- Trevor Linden – Vancouver Canucks
- Eric Lindros – Philadelphia Flyers
- Mark Messier – New York Rangers
- Keith Primeau – Detroit Red Wings
- Joe Sakic – Colorado Avalanche
- Brendan Shanahan – Hartford Whalers
- Pat Verbeek – New York Rangers
- Steve Yzerman – Detroit Red Wings
- Jason Arnott (A – did not play) – Edmonton Oilers
- Éric Dazé (A – did not play) – Chicago Blackhawks

=== 1996 Men's World Ice Hockey Championship ===
- Head coach: Tom Renney
- Doug Bodger
- Martin Brodeur
- Kelly Buchberger
- Andrew Cassels
- Jason Dawe
- Steve Duchesne
- Ray Ferraro
- Jeff Friesen
- Garry Galley
- Travis Green
- Jean–François Jomphe
- Curtis Joseph
- Paul Kariya
- David Matsos
- Brad May
- Derek Mayer
- Dean McAmmond
- Yanic Perreault
- Luke Richardson
- Darryl Sydor
- Steve Thomas
- Andrew Verner
- Glen Wesley

=== 1995 Men's World Ice Hockey Championship ===
- Head coach: Tom Renney

Goaltenders

- Corey Hirsch – Binghamton Rangers
- Dwayne Roloson – Saint John Flames
- Andrew Verner – Canadian National Team

Defense

- Greg Andrusak – Detroit Vipers
- Peter Allen – Canadian National Team
- Dale DeGray – Cleveland Lumberjacks
- Len Esau – Saint John Flames
- Jamie Heward – Canadian National Team
- Brad Schlegel – Canadian National Team
- Tom Tilley – Indianapolis Ice
- Brian Tutt (C) – Ilves Tampere

Forwards

- Luciano Borsato – Springfield Falcons
- Chris Bright – Canadian National Team
- Rich Chernomaz – St. John's Maple Leafs
- Brandon Convery – St. John's Maple Leafs
- Iain Fraser
- Mark Freer – Houston Aeros
- Chris Govedaris – Adirondack Red Wings
- Todd Hlushko – Saint John Flames
- Jean–François Jomphe – Canadian National Team
- Ralph Intranuovo – Cape Breton Oilers
- Mike Maneluk – Canadian National Team
- Andrew McKim – Adirondack Red Wings

=== 1994 Men's World Ice Hockey Championship ===
- Head coach: George Kingston
- Jason Arnott – Edmonton Oilers
- Marc Bergevin – Tampa Bay Lightning
- Rob Blake – Los Angeles Kings
- Rod Brind'Amour – Philadelphia Flyers
- Kelly Buchberger – Edmonton Oilers
- Shayne Corson – Edmonton Oilers
- Bobby Dollas – Mighty Ducks of Anaheim
- Steve Duchesne – St. Louis Blues
- Nelson Emerson – Winnipeg Jets
- Stéphane Fiset – Quebec Nordiques
- Paul Kariya – Canadian National Team
- Yves Racine – Philadelphia Flyers
- Bill Ranford – Edmonton Oilers
- Mike Ricci – Quebec Nordiques
- Luke Richardson – Edmonton Oilers
- Luc Robitaille (C) – Los Angeles Kings
- Joe Sakic – Quebec Nordiques
- Geoff Sanderson – Hartford Whalers
- Brendan Shanahan – St. Louis Blues
- Jamie Storr – Owen Sound Platers
- Darryl Sydor – Los Angeles Kings
- Steve Thomas – New York Islanders
- Pat Verbeek – Hartford Whalers

=== 1994 Winter Olympics ===
- Head coach: Tom Renney
- Mark Astley
- Adrian Aucoin
- David Harlock
- Corey Hirsch
- Todd Hlushko
- Greg Johnson
- Fabian Joseph
- Paul Kariya
- Chris Kontos
- Manny Legacé
- Ken Lovsin
- Derek Mayer
- Petr Nedvěd
- Dwayne Norris
- Greg Parks
- Allain Roy
- Jean–Yves Roy
- Brian Savage
- Brad Schlegel
- Wally Schreiber
- Chris Therien
- Todd Warriner
- Brad Werenka

=== 1993 Men's World Ice Hockey Championship ===
- Head coach: Mike Keenan
- Brian Benning
- Rod Brind'Amour
- Kelly Buchberger
- Terry Carkner
- Shayne Corson
- Kevin Dineen
- Dave Gagner
- Garry Galley
- Mike Gartner
- Adam Graves (C)
- Greg Johnson
- Paul Kariya
- Eric Lindros
- Norm MacIver
- Dave Manson
- Derek Mayer
- Bill Ranford
- Mark Recchi
- Geoff Sanderson
- Brian Savage
- Geoff Smith
- Ron Tugnutt

=== 1992 Men's World Ice Hockey Championship ===
- Head coach: Dave King
- Keith Acton
- Glenn Anderson (C)
- Bob Bassen
- Rod Brind'Amour
- Garth Butcher
- Sylvain Côté
- Nelson Emerson
- Pat Falloon
- Ray Ferraro
- Todd Gill
- Marc Habscheid
- Ron Hextall
- Kerry Huffman
- Trevor Kidd
- Derek King
- Chris Lindberg
- Brad Schlegel
- Randy Smith
- Rick Tabaracci
- Steve Thomas
- Brian Tutt
- Jason Woolley
- Trent Yawney

=== 1992 Winter Olympics ===
- Head coach: Dave King
- Dave Archibald
- Todd Brost
- Sean Burke
- Kevin Dahl
- Curt Giles
- Dave Hannan
- Gord Hynes
- Fabian Joseph
- Joé Juneau
- Trevor Kidd
- Patrick Lebeau
- Chris Lindberg
- Eric Lindros
- Kent Manderville
- Adrien Plavsic
- Dan Ratushny
- Sam Saint–Laurent
- Brad Schlegel
- Wally Schreiber
- Randy Smith
- Dave Tippett
- Brian Tutt
- Jason Woolley

=== 1991 Canada Cup ===
- Head coach: Mike Keenan
- Ed Belfour – Chicago Blackhawks
- Sean Burke – New Jersey Devils
- Paul Coffey (A) – Pittsburgh Penguins
- Shayne Corson – Montreal Canadiens
- Russ Courtnall – Montreal Canadiens
- Éric Desjardins – Montreal Canadiens
- Theoren Fleury – Calgary Flames
- Dirk Graham – Chicago Blackhawks
- Wayne Gretzky (C) – Los Angeles Kings
- Dale Hawerchuk (A) – Buffalo Sabres
- Steve Larmer – Chicago Blackhawks
- Eric Lindros – Oshawa Generals
- Al MacInnis – Calgary Flames
- Mark Messier (A) – Edmonton Oilers
- Larry Murphy – Pittsburgh Penguins
- Bill Ranford – Edmonton Oilers
- Luc Robitaille – Los Angeles Kings
- Brendan Shanahan – St. Louis Blues
- Steve Smith – Edmonton Oilers
- Scott Stevens – New Jersey Devils
- Brent Sutter – New York Islanders
- Mark Tinordi – Minnesota North Stars
- Rick Tocchet – Pittsburgh Penguins

=== 1991 Men's World Ice Hockey Championship ===
- Head coach: Dave King
- Dave Archibald
- Craig Billington
- Rob Blake
- Steve Bozek
- Sean Burke
- Geoff Courtnall
- Russ Courtnall
- Murray Craven
- Theoren Fleury
- Steve Konroyd
- Steve Larmer
- Doug Lidster (C)
- Trevor Linden
- Jamie Macoun
- Ric Nattress
- Yves Racine
- Cliff Ronning
- Joe Sakic
- Brad Schlegel
- Randy Smith
- Steve Thomas
- Mike Vernon
- Trent Yawney

=== 1990 Men's World Ice Hockey Championship ===
- Head coach: Dave King
- Keith Acton
- Greg Adams
- Brian Bellows
- Shawn Burr
- Paul Coffey (C)
- Murray Craven
- John Cullen
- Bob Essensa
- Theoren Fleury
- Doug Gilmour
- Rick Green
- Curtis Leschyshyn
- Doug Lidster
- Al MacInnis
- Jamie Macoun
- Kirk McLean
- Joe Nieuwendyk
- Michel Petit
- Mark Recchi
- Ron Sutter
- Rick Tocchet
- Ken Wregget
- Steve Yzerman (C)

=== 1989 Men's World Ice Hockey Championship ===
- Head coach: Dave King
- Glenn Anderson
- Brent Ashton
- Dave Babych
- Brian Bellows
- Sean Burke
- Randy Carlyle
- Ken Daneyko
- Kevin Dineen
- Dave Ellett
- Ray Ferraro
- Grant Fuhr
- Gerard Gallant
- Dale Hawerchuk (C)
- John MacLean
- Mario Marois
- Andrew McBain
- Mark Messier
- Kirk Muller (C)
- James Patrick
- Peter Sidorkiewicz
- Scott Stevens
- Pat Verbeek
- Steve Yzerman (C)

=== 1988 Winter Olympics ===
- Head coach: Dave King
- Ken Berry
- Serge Boisvert
- Brian Bradley
- Sean Burke
- Chris Felix
- Randy Gregg
- Marc Habscheid
- Bob Joyce
- Vaughn Karpan
- Merlin Malinowski
- Andy Moog
- Jim Peplinski
- Serge Roy
- Wally Schreiber
- Gord Sherven
- Tony Stiles
- Steve Tambellini
- Claude Vilgrain
- Tim Watters
- Ken Yaremchuk
- Trent Yawney (C)
- Zarley Zalapski

=== 1987 Canada Cup ===
- Head coach: Mike Keenan
- Glenn Anderson – Edmonton Oilers
- Raymond Bourque (A) – Boston Bruins
- Doug Crossman – Philadelphia Flyers
- Paul Coffey – Edmonton Oilers
- Kevin Dineen – Hartford Whalers
- Grant Fuhr – Edmonton Oilers
- Mike Gartner – Washington Capitals
- Doug Gilmour – St. Louis Blues
- Wayne Gretzky (C) – Edmonton Oilers
- Michel Goulet – Quebec Nordiques
- Craig Hartsburg – Minnesota North Stars
- Dale Hawerchuk (A) – Winnipeg Jets
- Ron Hextall – Philadelphia Flyers
- Kelly Hrudey – New York Islanders
- Claude Lemieux – Montreal Canadiens
- Mario Lemieux – Pittsburgh Penguins
- Mark Messier (A) – Edmonton Oilers
- Larry Murphy – Washington Capitals
- James Patrick – New York Rangers
- Brian Propp – Philadelphia Flyers
- Normand Rochefort – Quebec Nordiques
- Brent Sutter – New York Islanders
- Rick Tocchet – Philadelphia Flyers

=== 1987 Men's World Ice Hockey Championship ===
- Head coach: Dave King
- Keith Acton
- Brian Bellows
- Doug Bodger
- Sean Burke
- Dino Ciccarelli
- Kevin Dineen
- Bruce Driver
- Mike Foligno (C)
- Bob Froese
- Dirk Graham
- Craig Hartsburg
- Kirk Muller
- Larry Murphy
- Troy Murray
- Barry Pederson
- James Patrick
- Dan Quinn
- Paul Reinhart
- Pat Riggin
- Bob Rouse
- Al Secord
- Scott Stevens
- Tony Tanti
- Zarley Zalapski

=== 1986 Men's World Ice Hockey Championship ===
- Head coach: Pat Quinn
- Greg Adams
- Dave Andreychuk
- Mike Bullard
- Jacques Cloutier
- Paul Cyr
- Ken Daneyko
- Marcel Dionne (C)
- Mike Foligno
- Jim Fox
- Mark Hardy
- Dale Hawerchuk
- Kelly Hrudey
- Grant Ledyard
- Corrado Micalef
- Kirk Muller
- Denis Potvin
- Craig Redmond
- Phil Russell
- Brent Sutter
- Phil Sykes
- Tony Tanti
- Dave Taylor
- Jay Wells

=== 1985 Men's World Ice Hockey Championship ===
- Head coach: Doug Carpenter
- John Anderson
- Kevin Dineen
- Ron Francis
- Doug Halward
- Steve Konroyd
- Grant Ledyard
- Mario Lemieux
- Doug Lidster
- Brian MacLellan
- Jamie Macoun
- Don Maloney
- Kirk Muller
- Larry Murphy
- Bernie Nicholls
- Pat Riggin
- Stan Smyl
- Scott Stevens
- Tony Tanti
- Dave Taylor (C)
- Rick Vaive
- Rick Wamsley
- Steve Weeks
- Ian Wood
- Steve Yzerman

=== 1984 Canada Cup ===
- Head coach: Glen Sather
- Glenn Anderson – Edmonton Oilers
- Brian Bellows – Minnesota North Stars
- Mike Bossy – New York Islanders
- Bob Bourne – New York Islanders
- Raymond Bourque – Boston Bruins
- Paul Coffey – Edmonton Oilers
- Grant Fuhr – Edmonton Oilers
- Mike Gartner – Washington Capitals
- Michel Goulet – Quebec Nordiques
- Randy Gregg – Edmonton Oilers
- Wayne Gretzky (C) – Edmonton Oilers
- Charlie Huddy – Edmonton Oilers
- Réjean Lemelin – Calgary Flames
- Kevin Lowe – Edmonton Oilers
- Mark Messier – Edmonton Oilers
- Rick Middleton – Boston Bruins
- Pete Peeters – Boston Bruins
- Larry Robinson (C) – Montreal Canadiens
- Peter Šťastný – Quebec Nordiques
- Brent Sutter – New York Islanders
- John Tonelli – New York Islanders
- Doug Wilson – Chicago Blackhawks
- Steve Yzerman – Detroit Red Wings

=== 1984 Winter Olympics ===
- Head coach: Dave King
- Warren Anderson
- Robin Bartel
- Russ Courtnall
- J. J. Daigneault
- Kevin Dineen
- Dave Donnelly
- Bruce Driver
- Darren Eliot
- Patrick Flatley
- Dave Gagner
- Mario Gosselin
- Vaughn Karpan
- Doug Lidster
- Darren Lowe
- Kirk Muller
- James Patrick
- Craig Redmond
- Dave Tippett (C)
- Carey Wilson
- Dan Wood

=== 1983 Men's World Ice Hockey Championship ===
- Head coach: Dave King
- John Anderson
- Marcel Dionne (C)
- Brian Engblom
- Patrick Flatley
- Bob Gainey
- Mike Gartner
- Michel Goulet
- Doug Halward
- Craig Hartsburg
- Rick Lanz
- Dennis Maruk
- James Patrick
- Brian Propp
- Paul Reinhart
- Gord Sherven
- Charlie Simmer
- Darryl Sittler (C)
- Scott Stevens
- Dave Taylor
- Mike Veisor
- Rick Wamsley
- Tim Watters

=== 1982 Men's World Ice Hockey Championship ===
- Head coach: Dave King
- Bill Barber (C)
- Dino Ciccarelli
- Bobby Clarke (C)
- Bob Gainey
- Mike Gartner
- Curt Giles
- Rick Green
- Wayne Gretzky
- Craig Hartsburg
- Dale Hawerchuk
- Kevin Lowe
- Brad Maxwell
- Gilles Meloche
- Greg Millen
- Mark Napier
- Brian Propp
- Paul Reinhart
- Darryl Sittler
- Bobby Smith
- Rick Vaive
- John Van Boxmeer
- Ryan Walter

=== 1981 Canada Cup ===
- Head coach: Scotty Bowman
- Barry Beck – New York Rangers
- Mike Bossy – New York Islanders
- Raymond Bourque – Boston Bruins
- Marcel Dionne – Los Angeles Kings
- Ron Duguay – New York Rangers
- Don Edwards – Buffalo Sabres
- Brian Engblom – Montreal Canadiens
- Bob Gainey – Montreal Canadiens
- Danny Gare – Detroit Red Wings
- Clark Gillies – New York Islanders
- Butch Goring – New York Islanders
- Wayne Gretzky – Edmonton Oilers
- Craig Hartsburg – Minnesota North Stars
- Guy Lafleur – Montreal Canadiens
- Ken Linseman – Philadelphia Flyers
- Mike Liut – St. Louis Blues
- Rick Middleton – Boston Bruins
- Gilbert Perreault – Buffalo Sabres
- Denis Potvin (C) – New York Islanders
- Paul Reinhart – Calgary Flames
- Larry Robinson – Montreal Canadiens
- Billy Smith – New York Islanders
- Bryan Trottier – New York Islanders

=== 1981 Men's World Ice Hockey Championship ===
- Head coach: Don Cherry
- Dave Babych
- Norm Barnes
- Pat Boutette
- Lucien Deblois
- Mike Foligno
- John Garrett
- Mike Gartner
- Rick Green
- Willie Huber
- Guy Lafleur
- Barry Long
- Morris Lukowich
- Dennis Maruk
- Dale McCourt
- Lanny McDonald (C)
- Phil Myre
- John Ogrodnick
- Rob Ramage
- Larry Robinson
- Mike Rogers
- Steve Tambellini
- Ryan Walter

=== 1980 Winter Olympics ===
- Head coaches: Lorne Davis, Clare Drake, Tom Watt
- Glenn Anderson
- Warren Anderson
- Dan D'Alvise
- Ken Berry
- Ronald Davidson
- John Devaney
- Bob Dupuis
- Joe Grant
- Randy Gregg (C)
- Dave Hindmarch
- Paul MacLean
- Kevin Maxwell
- Jim Nill
- Terry O'Malley
- Paul Pageau
- Brad Pirie
- Kevin Primeau
- Donald Spring
- Tim Watters
- Stellio Zupancich

=== 1979 Men's World Ice Hockey Championship ===
- Head coach: Marshall Johnston
- Wayne Babych
- Guy Charron (C)
- Marcel Dionne
- Rick Green
- Trevor Johansen
- Nick Libett
- Al MacAdam
- Brad Marsh
- Dennis Maruk
- Brad Maxwell
- Dale McCourt
- Wilf Paiement
- Steve Payne
- Robert Picard
- Jim Rutherford
- David Shand
- Bobby Smith
- Greg Smith
- Ed Staniowski
- Garry Unger
- Ryan Walter
- Paul Woods

=== 1978 Men's World Ice Hockey Championship ===
- Head coach: Harry Howell
- Dan Bouchard
- Guy Charron
- Marcel Dionne (C)
- Rick Hampton
- Denis Herron
- Pat Hickey
- Dennis Kearns
- Don Lever
- Tom Lysiak
- Bob MacMillan
- Dennis Maruk
- Brad Maxwell
- Mike Murphy
- Wilf Paiement
- Robert Picard
- Jean Pronovost
- Pat Ribble
- David Shand
- Glen Sharpley
- Garry Unger

=== 1977 Men's World Ice Hockey Championship ===
- Head coach: Johnny Wilson
- Guy Charron
- Ron Ellis
- Phil Esposito (C)
- Tony Esposito
- Rod Gilbert
- Rick Hampton
- Dennis Kearns
- Ralph Klassen
- Pierre Larouche
- Al MacAdam
- Wayne Merrick
- Walt McKechnie
- Wilf Paiement
- Jean Pronovost
- Phil Russell
- Jim Rutherford
- Greg Smith
- Dallas Smith
- Carol Vadnais
- Eric Vail

=== 1976 Canada Cup ===
- Head coach: Scotty Bowman
- Assistant Coach: Don Cherry
- Bill Barber – Philadelphia Flyers
- Gerry Cheevers – Boston Bruins
- Bobby Clarke (C) – Philadelphia Flyers
- Marcel Dionne – Los Angeles Kings
- Phil Esposito – New York Rangers
- Bob Gainey – Montreal Canadiens
- Danny Gare – Buffalo Sabres
- Bobby Hull – Winnipeg Jets
- Guy Lafleur – Montreal Canadiens
- Guy Lapointe – Montreal Canadiens
- Reggie Leach – Philadelphia Flyers
- Peter Mahovlich – Montreal Canadiens
- Rick Martin – Buffalo Sabres
- Lanny McDonald – Toronto Maple Leafs
- Bobby Orr – Chicago Blackhawks
- Gilbert Perreault – Buffalo Sabres
- Denis Potvin – New York Islanders
- Glenn Resch – New York Islanders
- Larry Robinson – Montreal Canadiens
- Serge Savard – Montreal Canadiens
- Steve Shutt – Montreal Canadiens
- Darryl Sittler – Toronto Maple Leafs
- Rogatien Vachon – Los Angeles Kings
- Carol Vadnais – New York Rangers
- Jimmy Watson – Philadelphia Flyers

=== 1974 Summit Series ===
- Head coach: Billy Harris
- Ralph Backstrom – Chicago Cougars
- Serge Bernier – Quebec Nordiques
- Gerry Cheevers – Cleveland Crusaders
- Al Hamilton – Edmonton Oilers
- Jim Harrison – Edmonton Oilers
- Paul Henderson – Toronto Toros
- Réjean Houle – Quebec Nordiques
- Gordie Howe – Houston Aeros
- Mark Howe – Houston Aeros
- Marty Howe – Houston Aeros
- Bobby Hull – Winnipeg Jets
- André Lacroix – Jersey Knights
- Rick Ley – New England Whalers
- Frank Mahovlich – Toronto Toros
- Bruce MacGregor – Edmonton Oilers
- John McKenzie – Vancouver Blazers
- Don McLeod – Vancouver Blazers
- Brad Selwood – New England Whalers
- Paul Shmyr – Cleveland Crusaders
- Rick Smith – Minnesota Fighting Saints
- Pat Stapleton (C) – Chicago Cougars
- Marc Tardif – Quebec Nordiques
- J. C. Tremblay – Quebec Nordiques
- Mike Walton – Minnesota Fighting Saints
- Tom Webster – New England Whalers

=== 1972 Summit Series ===
- Head coach: Harry Sinden
- Assistant coach: John Ferguson
- Don Awrey – New York Rangers
- Red Berenson – St. Louis Blues
- Gary Bergman – Detroit Red Wings
- Wayne Cashman – Boston Bruins
- Bobby Clarke – Philadelphia Flyers
- Yvan Cournoyer – Montreal Canadiens
- Ken Dryden – Montreal Canadiens
- Marcel Dionne – Detroit Red Wings
- Ron Ellis – Toronto Maple Leafs
- Phil Esposito – Boston Bruins
- Tony Esposito – Chicago Blackhawks
- Rod Gilbert – New York Rangers
- Bill Goldsworthy – Minnesota North Stars
- Jocelyn Guevremont – Vancouver Canucks
- Vic Hadfield – New York Rangers
- Paul Henderson – Toronto Maple Leafs
- Dennis Hull – Chicago Blackhawks
- Eddie Johnston – Boston Bruins
- Guy Lapointe – Montreal Canadiens
- Frank Mahovlich – Montreal Canadiens
- Peter Mahovlich – Montreal Canadiens
- Rick Martin – Buffalo Sabres
- Stan Mikita – Chicago Blackhawks
- J. P. Parise – Minnesota North Stars
- Brad Park – New York Rangers
- Gilbert Perreault – Buffalo Sabres
- Jean Ratelle – New York Rangers
- Mickey Redmond – Detroit Red Wings
- Serge Savard – Montreal Canadiens
- Rod Seiling – New York Rangers
- Pat Stapleton – Chicago Blackhawks
- Dale Tallon – Vancouver Canucks
- Bill White – Chicago Blackhawks

=== 1969 World Ice Hockey Championship ===
- Head coach: Jackie McLeod
- Richie Bayes
- Gary Begg
- Roger Bourbonnais
- Jack Bownass
- Terry Caffery
- Ab DeMarco
- Ken Dryden
- Ted Hargreaves
- Bill Heindl
- Fran Huck
- Steve King
- Chuck Lefley
- Morris Mott
- Bob Murdoch
- Kevin O'Shea
- Terry O'Malley
- Gerry Pinder
- Steve Rexe
- Ken Stephanson
- Wayne Stephenson

=== 1968 Winter Olympics ===
- Head coach: Jackie McLeod
- Roger Bourbonnais
- Ken Broderick
- Ray Cadieux
- Paul Conlin
- Gary Dineen
- Brian Glennie
- Ted Hargreaves
- Fran Huck
- Marshall Johnston (C)
- Barry MacKenzie
- Bill MacMillan
- Steve Monteith
- Morris Mott
- Terry O'Malley
- Danny O'Shea
- Gerry Pinder
- Herb Pinder
- Wayne Stephenson

=== 1967 World Ice Hockey Championship ===
- Head coach: Jackie McLeod
- Gary Begg
- Roger Bourbonnais (C)
- Jack Bownass
- Carl Brewer
- Ray Cadieux
- Paul Conlin
- Jean Cusson
- Gary Dineen
- Ted Hargreaves
- Fran Huck
- Marshall Johnston
- Barry MacKenzie
- Billy MacMillan
- Seth Martin
- Morris Mott
- Terry O'Malley
- Danny O'Shea
- Addie Tambellini
- Wayne Stephenson

=== 1966 World Ice Hockey Championship ===
- Head coach: Jackie McLeod
- Gary Begg
- Roger Bourbonnais
- Ken Broderick
- Ray Cadieux
- Paul Conlin
- Lorne Davis
- George Faulkner
- Fran Huck
- Marshall Johnston
- Jackie McLeod
- Barry MacKenzie
- Billy MacMillan
- Seth Martin
- Rick McCann
- Morris Mott
- Terry O'Malley (C)
- Harvey Schmidt

=== 1965 World Ice Hockey Championship ===
- Head coach: Gordon Simpson
- Reg Abbott
- Gary Aldcorn
- Gary Begg
- Roger Bourbonnais
- Ken Broderick
- Don Collins
- Brian Conacher
- Paul Conlin
- Fred Dunsmore
- Gary Dineen
- Don Fletcher
- Bob Forhan
- Al Johnson
- Bill Johnson
- Barry MacKenzie
- Jim MacKenzie
- Seth Martin
- Grant Moore
- Terry O'Malley

=== 1964 Winter Olympics ===
- Head coach: David Bauer
- Hank Akervall (C)
- Gary Begg
- Roger Bourbonnais
- Ken Broderick
- Ray Cadieux
- Terry Clancy
- Brian Conacher
- Paul Conlin
- Gary Dineen
- Bob Forhan
- Marshall Johnston
- Seth Martin
- Barry MacKenzie
- Terry O'Malley
- Rod Seiling
- George Swarbrick
- John (Jack) Wilson - alternate

=== 1963 World Ice Hockey Championship ===
Trail Smoke Eaters

- Head coach: Bobby Kromm
- George Ferguson
- Don Fletcher
- Bob Forhan
- Howie Hornby
- Harold Jones
- Norm Lenardon
- Ted Maki
- Seth Martin
- Pinoke McIntyre
- Bob McKnight
- Jackie McLeod
- Walt Peacosh
- Gerry Penner
- Howie Penner
- Ed Pollesol
- Harry Smith
- Addie Tambellini

=== 1962 World Ice Hockey Championship ===
Galt Terriers

- Head coach: Lloyd Roubell
- GM Len Gaudette
- Bobby Brown
- Al Cullen
- Jack Douglas
- Joe Hogan
- Harold Hurley
- Alec Keeling
- Ted Maki
- Joe Malo
- Bob Mader
- Floyd Martin
- Bob McKnight
- Jackie McLeod
- Bill Mitchell
- Bobby Robertson
- Donald Rope
- Tod Sloan
- John Sofiak
- Harry Smith
- Bill Wylie

=== 1961 World Ice Hockey Championship ===
Trail Smoke Eaters

- Head coach: Bobby Kromm
- Ed Christofoli
- Claude Cyr
- George Ferguson
- Don Fletcher
- Cal Hockley
- Hal Jones
- Bobby Kromm
- Mike Lagace
- Norm Lenardon
- Seth Martin
- Pinoke McIntyre
- Jackie McLeod
- Walt Peacosh
- Gerry Penner
- Dave Rusnell
- Darryl Sly
- Harry Smith
- Addie Tambellini

=== 1960 Winter Olympics ===
Kitchener–Waterloo Dutchmen

- Head coach: Bobby Bauer
- Bob Attersley
- Maurice Benoît
- Jim Connelly
- Jack Douglas
- Fred Etcher
- Bob Forhan
- Don Head
- Harold Hurley
- Ken Laufman
- Floyd Martin
- Bob McKnight
- Cliff Pennington
- Donald Rope
- Bobby Rousseau
- George Samolenko
- Harry Sinden (C)
- Darryl Sly

=== 1959 World Ice Hockey Championship ===
Belleville McFarlands

- Head coach: Ike Hildebrand
- Red Berenson
- Bart Bradley
- Wayne Brown
- Pete Conacher
- Floyd Crawford
- Gordon Bell
- Maurice Benoît
- Denis Boucher
- Al Dewsbury
- Marv Edwards
- Fiori Goegan
- George Gosselin
- Ike Hildebrand
- Dave Jones
- Jean–Paul Lamirande
- John McLellan
- Paul Payette
- Lou Smrke

=== 1958 World Ice Hockey Championship ===
Whitby Dunlops

- Head coach: Sid Smith
- Sandy Air
- Bob Attersley
- Frank Bonello
- Connie Broden
- Roy Edwards
- Fred Etcher
- Bus Gagnon
- George Gosselin
- John Henderson
- Jean–Paul Lamirande
- Don McBeth
- Gord Myles
- Ted O'Connor
- Ed Redmond
- George Santolenko
- Harry Sinden (C)
- Sid Smith
- Alf Treen

=== 1956 Winter Olympics ===
Kitchener–Waterloo Dutchmen

- Head coach: Bobby Bauer
- Denis Brodeur
- Charlie Brooker
- Bill Colvin
- Alfred Horne
- Art Hurst
- Byrle Klinck
- Paul Knox
- Ken Laufman
- Howie Lee
- Jim Logan
- Floyd Martin
- Jack McKenzie (C)
- Donald Rope
- George Scholes
- Gerry Theberge
- Bob White
- Keith Woodall

=== 1955 World Ice Hockey Championship ===
Penticton V's

- Head coach: Grant Warwick
- Bernie Bathgate
- Don Berry
- Jim Fairburn
- Ed Kassian
- Doug Kilburn
- Kevin Conway
- Dino Mascotto
- George McAvoy (C)
- Jack McDonald
- Jack McIntyre
- Ivan McLelland
- Jim Middleton
- Don Moog
- Erine Rucks
- Mike Shebaga
- Jack Taggart
- Hal Tarala
- Bill Warwick
- Dick Warwick
- Grant Warwick

=== 1954 World Ice Hockey Championship ===
East York Lyndhursts

- Head coach: Greg Currie
- Tom Campbell (C)
- Doug Chapman
- Earl Clements
- Don Couch
- Harold Fiskari
- Norm Gray
- Moe Galand
- Tom Jamieson
- Larry Kearns
- Bob Kennedy
- Gavin Lindsay
- Don Lockhart
- John Petro
- Russ Robertson
- George Sayliss
- John Scott
- Bill Shill
- Vic Sluce
- Reg Spragge
- Dan Windley
- Eric Unger

=== 1952 Winter Olympics ===
Edmonton Mercurys

- Head coach: Lou Holmes
- George Abel
- John Davies
- Billy Dawe (C)
- Robert Dickson
- Donald Gauf
- William Gibson
- Ralph Hansch
- Robert Meyers
- David Miller
- Eric Paterson
- Thomas Pollock
- Allan Purvis
- Gordon Robertson
- Louis Secco
- Francis Sullivan
- Robert Watt

=== 1951 World Ice Hockey Championship ===
Lethbridge Maple Leafs

- Head coach: Dick Gray
- Bill Chandler
- Dinny Flanagan
- Bill Flick
- Bill Gibson
- Dick Gray
- Mallie Hughes
- Bert Knibbs
- Don McLean
- Jim Malacko
- Nap Milroy
- Hector Negrello (C)
- Stan Obodiac
- Walter Rimstad
- Mickey Roth
- Lou Siray
- Carl Sorokoski
- Don Vogan
- Tom Wood

=== 1950 World Ice Hockey Championship ===
Edmonton Mercurys

- Head coach: Jimmy Graham
- Harry Allen
- Robert David
- Billy Dawe
- Marsh Darling
- John Davies
- Wilbur Delaney
- Don Gauf
- Doug Kilburn
- Leo Lucchini
- Doug Macauley
- Jack Manson
- Al Purvis
- Don Stanley
- Robert Watt
- Pete Wright
- Hassie Young

=== 1949 World Ice Hockey Championship ===
Sudbury Wolves

- Head coach: Max Silverman
- Ray Bauer
- Joe de Bastiani
- Bill Dimock
- Doug Free
- Emil Gagne
- Bud Hashey
- Barney Hillson
- Herb Kewley
- John Kovich
- Don Munroe
- Al Picard
- Albert Rabelletto
- Jim Russell
- Tom Russell
- Don Stanley
- Joe Tergesen

=== 1948 Winter Olympics ===
Ottawa RCAF Flyers

- Head coach: Frank Boucher (nephew of Frank Boucher)
  - George McFaul (trainer)
  - Sandy Watson (manager)
- Hubert Brooks (reserve)
- Murray Dowey, (goaltender)
- Frank Dunster, (defenceman)
- Roy Forbes, (defenceman)
- Andy Gilpin, (forward) (reserve)
- Jean Gravelle
- Patsy Guzzo
- Wally Halder
- Ted Hibberd
- Ross King, (goaltender) (reserve)
- Henri–André Laperrière (defenceman)
- John Lecompte, (defenceman)
- Pete Leichnitz (reserve)
- George Mara
- Albert Renaud
- Reginald Schroeter
- Irving Taylor

=== 1939 World Ice Hockey Championship ===
Trail Smoke Eaters

- Head coach: Elmer Piper
- Mickey Brennen
- Buck Buchanan
- Ab Cronie
- Bunny Dame
- Jim Haight
- Benny Hayes
- Dick Kowcinak
- Tom Johnston
- John McCreedy
- Jim Morris
- Duke Scodellaro
- Mel Snowdon

=== 1938 World Ice Hockey Championship ===
Sudbury Wolves

- Head coach: Max Silverman
- Mel Albright
- Percy Allen
- Gordie Bruce
- Archie Burn
- Reg Chipman
- John Coulter
- Johnny Godfrey
- Roy Heximer
- Jack Marshall
- Pat McReavy
- Buster Portland
- Jim Russell
- Glen Sutherland

=== 1937 World Ice Hockey Championship ===
Kimberley Dynamiters

- Head coach: John Achtzener
- Tom Almack
- Fred Botterill
- Fred Burnett
- Ken Campbell
- George Goble
- Eric Hornquist
- Doug Keiver
- James Kemp
- Paul Kozak
- Hugo Mackie
- Ralph Reading
- Harry Robertson
- George Wilson

=== 1936 Winter Olympics ===
Port Arthur Bearcats

- Head coach: Al Pudas
- Maxwell Deacon
- Hugh Farquharson
- Kenneth Farmer
- James Haggarty
- Walter Kitchen
- Raymond Milton
- Francis Moore
- Herman Murray (C)
- Arthur Nash
- David Neville
- Alexander Sinclair
- Ralph St. Germain
- Bill Thomson

=== 1935 World Ice Hockey Championship ===
Winnipeg Monarchs

- Head coach: Scotty Oliver
- Archie Creighton
- Roy Henkel
- Albert Lemay
- Tony Lemay
- Vic Lindquist
- Art Rice–Jones
- Romeo Rivers
- Cam Shewan
- Norm Yellowlees

=== 1934 World Ice Hockey Championship ===
Saskatoon Quakers

- Head coach: Johnny Walker
- Les Bird
- Tommy Dewar
- Jim Dewey
- Cliff Lake
- Elmer Piper
- Ab Rogers
- Bert Scharfe
- Ron Silver
- Ray Watkins
- Ab Welsh
- Cooney Woods
- Hobb Wilson

=== 1933 World Ice Hockey Championship ===
Toronto National Sea Fleas

- Head coach: Harold Ballard
- Cliff Chisholm
- Frank Collins
- John Hern
- Kenny Kane
- Norm Lamport
- Doug Lough
- Clare McIntyre
- Jimmy McMullen
- Stuffy Mueller

=== 1932 Winter Olympics ===
Winnipeg Hockey Club

- Head coach: Jack Hughes
- William Cockburn (C)
- Clifford Crowley
- Albert Duncanson
- George Garbutt
- Roy Henkel
- Victor Lindquist
- Norman Malloy
- Walter Monson
- Kenneth Moore
- Romeo Rivers
- Hack Simpson
- Hugh Sutherland
- Stanley Wagner
- Alston Wise

=== 1931 World Ice Hockey Championship ===
University of Manitoba Grads

- Head coach: Blake Watson
- George Hill
- Gord MacKenzie (C)
- Sammy McCallum
- Ward McVey
- Frank Morris
- Jack Pidcock
- Art Puttee
- Blake Watson
- Guy Williamson

=== 1930 World Ice Hockey Championship ===
Toronto CCMs

- Head coach: Les Allen
- Willie Adams
- Howard Armstrong (C)
- Bert Clayton
- Joe Griffen
- Gordon Grant
- Alex Park
- Fred Radke
- Percy Timpson

=== 1928 Winter Olympics ===
University of Toronto Grads

- Head coach: Conn Smythe
- Charles Delahaye
- Frank Fisher
- Louis Hudson
- Norbert Mueller
- Herbert Plaxton
- Hugh Plaxton
- Roger Plaxton
- John Porter (C)
- Frank Sullivan
- Joseph Sullivan
- Ross Taylor
- Dave Trottier

=== 1924 Winter Olympics ===
Toronto Granites

- Head coach: Frank Rankin
- Jack Cameron
- Ernie Collett
- Bert McCaffrey
- Harold McMunn
- Dunc Munro (C)
- Beattie Ramsay
- Cyril Slater
- Reginald Smith
- Harry Watson

=== 1920 Summer Olympics ===
Winnipeg Falcons

Head coach: Gordon Sigurjonsson

Goaltender

- Walter Byron

Defence

- Robert Benson
- Konrad Johannesson

Forward

- Frank Fredrickson – C
- Chris Fridfinnson
- Magnus Goodman
- Haldor Halderson
- Allan Woodman

== Junior ==
=== 2026 World Junior Ice Hockey Championship ===
- Head coach: (Canada) Dale Hunter

Pos.	No.	Player	Team	League	NHL Rights
G	1	Jack Ivankovic	(United States) University of Michigan	(United States) B1G	Nashville Predators
G	30	Carter George	(Canada) Owen Sound Attack	(Canada) OHL	Los Angeles Kings
G	31	Joshua Ravensbergen	(Canada) Prince George Cougars	(Canada) WHL	San Jose Sharks
D	2	Kashawn Aitcheson	(Canada) Barrie Colts	(Canada) OHL	New York Islanders
D	4	Harrison Brunicke	(United States) Pittsburgh Penguins	(United States) NHL	Pittsburgh Penguins
D	5	Carson Carels	(Canada) Prince George Cougars	(Canada) WHL	Calgary Flames
D	6	Ben Danford	(Canada) Brantford Bulldogs	(Canada) OHL	Toronto Maple Leafs
D	8	Ethan MacKenzie	(Canada) Edmonton Oil Kings	(Canada) WHL	Toronto Maple Leafs
D	10	Cameron Reid	(Canada) Kitchener Rangers	(Canada) OHL	Nashville Predators
D	12	Zayne Parekh	(Canada) Calgary Flames	(Canada) NHL	Calgary Flames
D	14	Keaton Verhoeff	(United States) University of North Dakota	(United States) NCHC	San Jose Sharks
F	7	Michael Misa	(United States) San Jose Sharks	(United States) NHL	San Jose Sharks
F	8	Braeden Cootes	(United States) Seattle Thunderbirds	(Canada) WHL	Vancouver Canucks
F	9	Gavin McKenna	(United States) Penn State University	(United States) B1G	Toronto Maple Leafs
F	11	Tij Iginla	(Canada) Kelowna Rockets	(Canada) WHL	Utah Mammoth
F	17	Jett Luchanko	(Canada) Brantford Bulldogs	(Canada) OHL	Philadelphia Flyers
F	19	Carter Bear	(United States) Everett Silvertips	(Canada) WHL	Detroit Red Wings
F	21	Cole Reschny	(United States) University of North Dakota	(United States) NCHC	Calgary Flames
F	22	Porter Martone	(United States) Michigan State University	(United States) B1G	Philadelphia Flyers
F	23	Sam O’Reilly	(Canada) London Knights	(Canada) OHL	Tampa Bay Lightning
F	24	Liam Greentree	(Canada) Windsor Spitfires	(Canada) OHL	Los Angeles Kings
F	25	Caleb Desnoyers	(Canada) Moncton Wildcats	(Canada) QMJHL	Utah Mammoth
F	26	Cole Beaudoin	(Canada) Barrie Colts	(Canada) OHL	Utah Mammoth
F	28	Brady Martin	(Canada) Sault Ste. Marie Greyhounds	(Canada) OHL	Nashville Predators
F	29	Michael Hage	(United States) Michigan Wolverines	(United States) B1G	Montreal Canadiens

=== 2025 World Junior Ice Hockey Championship ===
Head coach

- Dave Cameron

Goaltender

- Carson Bjarnason - Brandon Wheat Kings
- Carter George - Owen Sound Attack
- Jack Ivankovic - Brampton Battalion

Defence

- Beau Akey - Barrie Colts
- Oliver Bonk - London Knights
- Sam Dickinson - London Knights
- Andrew Gibson - Sault Ste. Marie Greyhounds
- Tanner Molendyk - Saskatoon Blades
- Sawyer Mynio - Seattle Thunderbirds
- Caden Price - Kelowna Rockets
- Matthew Schaefer - Erie Otters

Forward

- Cole Beaudoin - Barrie Colts
- Mathieu Cataford - Rimouski Oceanic
- Berkly Catton - Spokane Chiefs
- Easton Cowan - London Knights
- Ethan Gauthier - Drummondville Voltigeurs
- Tanner Howe - Calgary Hitmen
- Jett Luchanko - Guelph Storm
- Porter Martone - Kitchener Rangers
- Gavin McKenna - Medicine Hat Tigers
- Bradly Nadeau - Chicago Wolves
- Luca Pinelli - Ottawa 67’s
- Carson Rehkopf - Kitchener Rangers
- Calum Ritchie - Oshawa Generals
- Brayden Yager - Lethbridge Hurricanes

=== 2024 World Junior Ice Hockey Championship ===
Head coach

- Alan Letang

Goaltender

- Scott Ratzlaff - Seattle Thunderbirds
- Mathis Rousseau - Halifax Mooseheads
- Samuel St-Hilaire - Sherbrooke Phoenix

Defence

- Oliver Bonk - London Knights
- Jorian Donovan - Brantford Bulldogs
- Jake Furlong - Halifax Mooseheads
- Maveric Lamoureux - Drummondville Voltigeurs
- Denton Mateychuk - Moose Jaw Warriors
- Ty Nelson - North Bay Battalion
- Noah Warren - Victoriaville Tigres

Forward

- Owen Allard - Sault Ste. Marie Greyhounds
- Owen Beck - Peterborough Petes
- Macklin Celebrini - Boston University Terriers
- Easton Cowan - London Knights
- Nate Danielson - Brandon Wheat Kings
- Jordan Dumais - Halifax Mooseheads
- Jagger Firkus - Moose Jaw Warriors
- Conor Geekie - Wenatchee Wild
- Fraser Minten - Saskatoon Blades
- Matt Poitras - Boston Bruins
- Carson Rehkopf - Kitchener Rangers
- Matthew Savoie - Wenatchee Wild
- Matthew Wood - University of Connecticut Huskies
- Brayden Yager - Moose Jaw Warriors

Tristan Luneau and Tanner Molendyk were initially selected to the team but had to withdraw due to injury.

=== 2023 World Junior Ice Hockey Championship ===
Head coach

- Dennis Williams

Goaltender

- Benjamin Gaudreau - Sarnia Sting
- Thomas Milic - Seattle Thunderbirds

Defence

- Nolan Allan - Seattle Thunderbirds
- Brandt Clarke - Los Angeles Kings
- Ethan Del Mastro - Mississauga Steelheads
- Tyson Hinds - Sherbrooke Phoenix
- Kevin Korchinski - Seattle Thunderbirds
- Jack Matier - Ottawa 67’s
- Olen Zellweger - Everett Silvertips

Forward

- Caedan Bankier - Kamloops Blazers
- Owen Beck - Mississauga Steelheads
- Connor Bedard - Regina Pats
- Colton Dach - Kelowna Rockets
- Zach Dean - Gatineau Olympiques
- Adam Fantilli - University of Michigan
- Nathan Gaucher - Quebec Remparts
- Dylan Guenther - Arizona Coyotes
- Zack Ostapchuk - Vancouver Giants
- Brennan Othmann - Peterborough Petes
- Joshua Roy - Sherbrooke Phoenix
- Reid Schaefer - Seattle Thunderbirds
- Logan Stankoven - Kamloops Blazers
- Shane Wright - Seattle Kraken

=== 2022 World Junior Ice Hockey Championship summer edition ===
Head coach

- Dave Cameron

Goaltender

- Brett Brochu - London Knights
- Sebastian Cossa - Edmonton Oil Kings
- Dylan Garand - Kamloops Blazers

Defence

- Lukas Cormier - Charlottetown Islanders
- Ethan Del Mastro - Mississauga Steelheads
- Carson Lambos - Winnipeg Ice
- Ryan O'Rourke - Sault Ste. Marie Greyhounds
- Donovan Sebrango - Grand Rapids Griffins
- Ronan Seeley - Everett Silvertips
- Jack Thompson - Sault Ste. Marie Greyhounds
- Olen Zellweger - Everett Silvertips

Forward

- Connor Bedard - Regina Pats
- Will Cuylle - Windsor Spitfires
- Elliot Desnoyers - Halifax Mooseheads
- William Dufour - Saint John Sea Dogs
- Tyson Foerster - Barrie Colts
- Nathan Gaucher - Quebec Remparts
- Ridly Greig - Brandon Wheat Kings
- Kent Johnson - Columbus Blue Jackets
- Riley Kidney - Acadie-Bathurst Titan
- Mason McTavish - Hamilton Bulldogs
- Zack Ostapchuk - Vancouver Giants
- Brennan Othmann - Flint Firebirds
- Joshua Roy - Sherbrooke Phoenix
- Logan Stankoven - Kamloops Blazers

=== 2022 World Junior Ice Hockey Championship winter edition ===
Head coach

- Dave Cameron

Goaltender

- Brett Brochu - London Knights
- Sebastian Cossa - Edmonton Oil Kings
- Dylan Garand - Kamloops Blazers

Defence

- Lukas Cormier - Charlottetown Islanders
- Kaiden Guhle - Edmonton Oil Kings
- Carson Lambos - Winnipeg Ice
- Ryan O'Rourke - Sault Ste. Marie Greyhounds
- Owen Power - University of Michigan
- Donovan Sebrango - Grand Rapids Griffins
- Ronan Seeley - Everett Silvertips
- Olen Zellweger - Everett Silvertips

Forward

- Connor Bedard - Regina Pats
- Xavier Bourgault - Shawinigan Cataractes
- Mavrik Bourque - Shawinigan Cataractes
- Will Cuylle - Windsor Spitfires
- Elliot Desnoyers - Halifax Mooseheads
- Ridly Greig - Brandon Wheat Kings
- Dylan Guenther - Edmonton Oil Kings
- Kent Johnson - University of Michigan
- Mason McTavish - Peterborough Petes
- Jake Neighbours - Edmonton Oil Kings
- Cole Perfetti - Manitoba Moose
- Logan Stankoven - Kamloops Blazers
- Justin Sourdif - Vancouver Giants
- Shane Wright - Kingston Frontenacs

=== 2021 World Junior Ice Hockey Championship ===
Head coach

- André Tourigny

Goaltender

- Dylan Garand - Kamloops Blazers
- Taylor Gauthier - Prince George Cougars
- Devon Levi - Northeastern University

Defence

- Justin Barron - Halifax Mooseheads
- Bowen Byram - Vancouver Giants (A)
- Jamie Drysdale - Erie Otters
- Kaiden Guhle - Prince Albert Raiders
- Thomas Harley - Mississauga Steelheads
- Kaedan Korczak - Kelowna Rockets
- Braden Schneider - Brandon Wheat Kings
- Jordan Spence - Moncton Wildcats

Forward

- Quinton Byfield - Sudbury Wolves
- Dylan Cozens - Lethbridge Hurricanes (A)
- Kirby Dach - Chicago Blackhawks (C)
- Dylan Holloway - University of Wisconsin
- Peyton Krebs - Winnipeg Ice
- Connor McMichael - London Knights
- Dawson Mercer - Chicoutimi Sagueneens
- Alex Newhook - Boston College
- Jakob Pelletier - Val-d'Or Foreurs
- Cole Perfetti - Saginaw Spirit
- Jack Quinn - Ottawa 67’s
- Ryan Suzuki - Saginaw Spirit
- Philip Tomasino - Oshawa Generals
- Connor Zary - Kamloops Blazers

=== 2020 World Junior Ice Hockey Championship ===
Head coach

- Dale Hunter

Goaltender

- Nico Daws - Guelph Storm
- Joel Hofer - Portland Winterhawks
- Olivier Rodrigue - Moncton Wildcats

Defence

- Calen Addison - Lethbridge Hurricanes
- Kevin Bahl - Ottawa 67's
- Jacob Bernard-Docker - University of North Dakota
- Bowen Byram - Vancouver Giants
- Jamie Drysdale - Erie Otters
- Jared McIsaac - Halifax Mooseheads
- Ty Smith (ice hockey) - Spokane Chiefs

Forward

- Quinton Byfield - Sudbury Wolves
- Dylan Cozens - Lethbridge Hurricanes
- Ty Dellandrea - Flint Firebirds
- Aidan Dudas - Owen Sound
- Nolan Foote - Kelowna Rockets
- Liam Foudy - London Knights
- Barrett Hayton - Arizona Coyotes
- Alexis Lafrenière - Rimouski Oceanic
- Raphaël Lavoie - Halifax Mooseheads
- Connor McMichael - London Knights
- Dawson Mercer - Drummondville Voltigeurs
- Akil Thomas - Niagara IceDogs
- Joe Veleno - Grand Rapids Griffins

=== 2019 World Junior Ice Hockey Championship ===
Head coach

- Tim Hunter (ice hockey)

Goaltender

- Michael DiPietro - Ottawa 67's
- Ian Scott - Prince Albert Raiders

Defence

- Evan Bouchard (A) - London Knights
- Josh Brook - Moose Jaw Warriors
- Noah Dobson - Acadie-Bathurst Titan
- Jared McIsaac - Halifax Mooseheads
- Ian Mitchell (A) - University of Denver
- Markus Phillips - Owen Sound Attack
- Ty Smith (ice hockey) - Spokane Chiefs

Forward

- Jaret Anderson-Dolan (A) - Spokane Chiefs
- Shane Bowers - Boston University Terriers
- Max Comtois (C) - Drummondville Voltigeurs
- MacKenzie Entwistle - Hamilton Bulldogs
- Morgan Frost - Sault Ste. Marie Greyhounds
- Cody Glass - Portland Winterhawks
- Barrett Hayton - Sault Ste. Marie Greyhounds
- Alexis Lafrenière - Rimouski Oceanic
- Brett Leason - Prince Albert Raiders
- Jack Studnicka - Oshawa Generals
- Nick Suzuki - Owen Sound Attack
- Owen Tippett - Mississauga Steelheads
- Joe Veleno - Drummondville Voltigeurs

=== 2018 World Junior Ice Hockey Championship ===
Head coach

- Dominique Ducharme (ice hockey)

Goaltender

- Carter Hart - Philadelphia Flyers
- Colton Point - Colgate University Raiders

Defence

- Jake Bean - Calgary Hitmen
- Conor Timmins - Sault Ste. Marie Greyhounds
- Cal Foote - Kelowna Rockets
- Cale Makar - UMass Minutemen
- Dante Fabbro (A) - Boston University Terriers
- Kale Clague (A) - Brandon Wheat Kings
- Victor Mete (A) - Montreal Canadiens

Forward

- Dillon Dubé (C) - Kelowna Rockets
- Boris Katchouk - Sault Ste. Marie Greyhounds
- Max Comtois - Victoriaville Tigres
- Taylor Raddysh - Erie Otters
- Tyler Steenbergen - Swift Current Broncos
- Drake Batherson - Cape Breton Screaming Eagles
- Michael McLeod - Mississauga Steelheads
- Brett Howden - Moose Jaw Warriors
- Sam Steel - Regina Pats
- Alex Formenton - London Knights
- Jordan Kyrou - Sarnia Sting
- Robert Thomas - London Knights
- Jonah Gadjovich - Owen Sound Attack

=== 2017 World Junior Ice Hockey Championship ===
Head coach

- Dominique Ducharme (ice hockey)

Goaltender

- Carter Hart - Everett Silvertips
- Connor Ingram - Kamloops Blazers

Defence

- Jake Bean - Calgary Hitmen
- Noah Juulsen - Everett Silvertips
- Thomas Chabot (A) - Saint John Sea Dogs
- Philippe Myers - Rouyn-Noranda Huskies
- Dante Fabbro - Boston University Terriers
- Kale Clague - Brandon Wheat Kings
- Jérémy Lauzon - Rouyn-Noranda Huskies

Forward

- Dillon Dubé - Kelowna Rockets
- Mathieu Joseph - Saint John Sea Dogs
- Julien Gauthier - Val-d'Or Foreurs
- Mathew Barzal (A) - Seattle Thunderbirds
- Nicolas Roy - Chicoutimi Saguenéens
- Taylor Raddysh - Erie Otters
- Tyson Jost - University of North Dakota Fighting Hawks
- Pierre-Luc Dubois - Cape Breton Screaming Eagles
- Dylan Strome (C) - Erie Otters
- Michael McLeod - Mississauga Steelheads
- Blake Speers - Sault Ste. Marie Greyhounds
- Anthony Cirelli - Oshawa Generals
- Mitchell Stephens - Saginaw Spirit

=== 2016 World Junior Ice Hockey Championship ===
Head coach

- Dave Lowry

Goaltender

- Mason McDonald – Charlottetown Islanders
- Mackenzie Blackwood – Barrie Colts
- Samuel Montembeault – Blainville–Boisbriand Armada

Defence

- Joe Hicketts (A) – Victoria Royals
- Haydn Fleury – Red Deer Rebels
- Thomas Chabot – Saint John Sea Dogs
- Brandon Hickey – Boston University
- Roland McKeown – Kingston Frontenacs
- Travis Sanheim – Calgary Hitmen
- Travis Dermott – Erie Otters

Forward

- Dylan Strome – Erie Otters
- Brendan Perlini – Niagara IceDogs
- Julien Gauthier – Val–d'Or Foreurs
- Mathew Barzal – Seattle Thunderbirds
- Rourke Chartier – Kelowna Rockets
- Mitch Marner – London Knights
- Travis Konecny – Ottawa 67's
- Jake Virtanen – Vancouver Canucks
- Brayden Point (C) – Moose Jaw Warriors
- Anthony Beauvillier – Shawinigan Cataractes
- John Quenneville – Brandon Wheat Kings
- Mitchell Stephens – Saginaw Spirit
- Lawson Crouse (A) – Kingston Frontenacs

=== 2015 World Junior Ice Hockey Championship ===
Head coach

- Benoit Groulx

Goaltender

- Eric Comrie – Tri–City Americans
- Zachary Fucale – Halifax Mooseheads

Defence

- Joe Hicketts – Victoria Royals
- Dillon Heatherington – Swift Current Broncos
- Madison Bowey – Kelowna Rockets
- Samuel Morin – Rimouski Océanic
- Shea Theodore – Seattle Thunderbirds
- Josh Morrissey – Kelowna Rockets
- Darnell Nurse – Sault Ste. Marie Greyhounds

Forward

- Brayden Point -- Moose Jaw Warriors
- Anthony Duclair – Quebec Remparts
- Max Domi – London Knights
- Connor McDavid – Erie Otters
- Jake Virtanen – Calgary Hitmen
- Nic Petan – Portland Winterhawks
- Nick Paul – North Bay Battalion
- Nick Ritchie – Peterborough Petes
- Frédérik Gauthier – Rimouski Océanic
- Sam Reinhart – Kootenay Ice
- Curtis Lazar – Ottawa Senators
- Lawson Crouse – Kingston Frontenacs
- Robby Fabbri – Guelph Storm

=== 2014 World Junior Ice Hockey Championship ===
Head coach

- Brent Sutter

Goaltender

- Zachary Fucale – Halifax Mooseheads
- Jake Paterson – Saginaw Spirit

Defence

- Chris Bigras – Owen Sound Attack
- Mathew Dumba – Minnesota Wild
- Aaron Ekblad – Barrie Colts
- Josh Morrissey – Prince Albert Raiders
- Adam Pelech – Erie Otters
- Derrick Pouliot – Portland Winterhawks
- Griffin Reinhart – Edmonton Oil Kings

Forward

- Josh Anderson – London Knights
- Jonathan Drouin – Halifax Mooseheads
- Frédérik Gauthier – Rimouski Océanic
- Bo Horvat – London Knights
- Charles Hudon – Chicoutimi Saguenéens
- Scott Laughton – Oshawa Generals
- Curtis Lazar – Edmonton Oil Kings
- Taylor Leier – Portland Winterhawks
- Anthony Mantha – Val-d'Or Foreurs
- Connor McDavid – Erie Otters
- Nic Petan – Portland Winterhawks
- Sam Reinhart – Kootenay Ice
- Kerby Rychel – Guelph Storm

=== 2013 World Junior Ice Hockey Championships ===
Head coach

- Steve Spott

Goaltender

- Jordan Binnington – Owen Sound Attack
- Jake Paterson – Saginaw Spirit
- Malcolm Subban – Belleville Bulls

Defence

- Dougie Hamilton – Niagara IceDogs
- Scott Harrington (A) – London Knights
- Ryan Murphy – Kitchener Rangers
- Xavier Ouellet – Blainville-Boisbriand Armada
- Griffin Reinhart – Edmonton Oil Kings
- Morgan Rielly – Moose Jaw Warriors
- Tyler Wotherspoon – Portland Winterhawks

Forward

- Anthony Camara – Barrie Colts
- Phillip Danault – Victoriaville Tigres
- Jonathan Drouin – Halifax Mooseheads
- Jonathan Huberdeau (A) – Saint John Sea Dogs
- Charles Hudon – Chicoutimi Saguenéens
- Boone Jenner – Oshawa Generals
- JC Lipon – Kamloops Blazers
- Nathan MacKinnon – Halifax Mooseheads
- Mark McNeill – Prince Albert Raiders
- Ryan Nugent–Hopkins (C) – Oklahoma City Barons
- Ty Rattie – Portland Winterhawks
- Brett Ritchie – Niagara IceDogs
- Mark Scheifele – Barrie Colts
- Ryan Strome – Niagara IceDogs

=== 2012 World Junior Ice Hockey Championships ===
Head coach

- Don Hay

Goaltender

- Mark Visentin – Niagara IceDogs
- Scott Wedgewood – Plymouth Whalers

Defence

- Nathan Beaulieu – Saint John Sea Dogs
- Brandon Gormley (A) – Moncton Wildcats
- Dougie Hamilton – Niagara IceDogs
- Scott Harrington – London Knights
- Ryan Murray – Everett Silvertips
- Jamie Oleksiak – Saginaw Spirit
- Mark Pysyk – Edmonton Oil Kings

Forward

- Michaël Bournival – Shawinigan Cataractes
- Brett Connolly (A) – Tampa Bay Lightning
- Brendan Gallagher – Vancouver Giants
- Freddie Hamilton – Niagara IceDogs
- Quinton Howden (A) – Moose Jaw Warriors
- Jonathan Huberdeau – Saint John Sea Dogs
- Boone Jenner – Oshawa Generals
- Tanner Pearson – Barrie Colts
- Mark Scheifele – Barrie Colts
- Jaden Schwartz (C) – Colorado College Tigers
- Devante Smith–Pelly (A) – Anaheim Ducks
- Mark Stone – Brandon Wheat Kings
- Ryan Strome – Niagara IceDogs

=== 2011 World Junior Ice Hockey Championships ===
Head coach

- Dave Cameron

Goaltender

- Olivier Roy – Acadie-Bathurst Titan
- Mark Visentin – Niagara IceDogs

Defence

- Tyson Barrie – Kelowna Rockets
- Jared Cowen (A) – Spokane Chiefs
- Calvin de Haan (A) – Oshawa Generals
- Simon Després – Saint John Sea Dogs
- Ryan Ellis (C) – Windsor Spitfires
- Erik Gudbranson – Kingston Frontenacs
- Dylan Olsen – Minnesota–Duluth Bulldogs

Forward

- Carter Ashton – Tri–City Americans
- Casey Cizikas – Mississauga St. Michael's Majors
- Brett Connolly – Prince George Cougars
- Sean Couturier – Drummondville Voltigeurs
- Cody Eakin – Swift Current Broncos
- Marcus Foligno – Sudbury Wolves
- Curtis Hamilton – Saskatoon Blades
- Quinton Howden – Moose Jaw Warriors
- Ryan Johansen – Portland Winterhawks
- Zack Kassian – Windsor Spitfires
- Louis Leblanc – Montreal Juniors
- Brayden Schenn (A) – Brandon Wheat Kings
- Jaden Schwartz – Colorado College Tigers

=== 2010 World Junior Ice Hockey Championship ===
Head coach

- Willie Desjardins

Goaltender

- Jake Allen – Montreal Juniors
- Martin Jones – Calgary Hitmen

Defence

- Jared Cowen – Spokane Chiefs
- Calvin de Haan – Oshawa Generals
- Ryan Ellis (A) – Windsor Spitfires
- Travis Hamonic – Moose Jaw Warriors
- Alex Pietrangelo (A) – St. Louis Blues
- Marco Scandella – Val-d'Or Foreurs
- Colten Teubert (A) – Regina Pats

Forward

- Luke Adam – Cape Breton Screaming Eagles
- Gabriel Bourque – Baie-Comeau Drakkar
- Jordan Caron – Rimouski Océanic
- Patrice Cormier (C) – Rimouski Océanic
- Stefan Della Rovere (A) – Barrie Colts
- Jordan Eberle (A) – Regina Pats
- Taylor Hall – Windsor Spitfires
- Adam Henrique – Windsor Spitfires
- Nazem Kadri – London Knights
- Brandon Kozun – Calgary Hitmen
- Brandon McMillan – Kelowna Rockets
- Greg Nemisz – Windsor Spitfires
- Brayden Schenn – Brandon Wheat Kings

=== 2009 World Junior Ice Hockey Championship ===
Head coach

- Pat Quinn

Goaltender

- Chet Pickard – Tri-City Americans
- Dustin Tokarski – Spokane Chiefs

Defence

- Keith Aulie – Brandon Wheat Kings
- Ryan Ellis – Windsor Spitfires
- Cody Goloubef – Wisconsin Badgers
- Thomas Hickey (C) – Seattle Thunderbirds
- Tyler Myers – Kelowna Rockets
- Alex Pietrangelo – Niagara IceDogs
- P. K. Subban (A) – Belleville Bulls
- Colten Teubert – Regina Pats

Forward

- Jamie Benn – Kelowna Rockets
- Zach Boychuk (A) – Lethbridge Hurricanes
- Patrice Cormier – Rimouski Océanic
- Stefan Della Rovere – Barrie Colts
- Chris DiDomenico – Drummondville Voltigeurs
- Jordan Eberle – Regina Pats
- Tyler Ennis – Medicine Hat Tigers
- Angelo Esposito – Montreal Juniors
- Cody Hodgson (A) – Brampton Battalion
- Evander Kane – Vancouver Giants
- Brett Sonne – Calgary Hitmen
- John Tavares (A) – Oshawa Generals

Dana Tyrell was initially selected to the team but had to withdraw due to injury.

=== 2008 World Junior Ice Hockey Championship ===
Head coach

- Craig Hartsburg

Assistant coach

- Clément Jodoin
- Curtis Hunt

Goaltender

- Jonathan Bernier – Lewiston Maineiacs
- Steve Mason – London Knights

Defence

- Karl Alzner – Calgary Hitmen
- Drew Doughty – Guelph Storm
- Josh Godfrey – Sault Ste. Marie Greyhounds
- Thomas Hickey – Seattle Thunderbirds
- Logan Pyett – Regina Pats
- Luke Schenn – Kelowna Rockets
- P. K. Subban – Belleville Bulls

Forward

- Zach Boychuk – Lethbridge Hurricanes
- Colton Gillies – Saskatoon Blades
- Claude Giroux – Gatineau Olympiques
- Matt Halischuk – Kitchener Rangers
- Riley Holzapfel – Moose Jaw Warriors
- Stefan Legein – Niagara IceDogs
- Brad Marchand– Val–d'Or Foreurs
- Shawn Matthias – Belleville Bulls
- Wayne Simmonds – Owen Sound Attack
- Steven Stamkos – Sarnia Sting
- Brandon Sutter – Red Deer Rebels
- John Tavares – Oshawa Generals
- Kyle Turris – Wisconsin Badgers

=== 2007 Super Series ===
Head coach: Brent Sutter

Goaltender

- Jonathan Bernier
- Steve Mason
- Leland Irving

Defence

- Karl Alzner (A)
- Drew Doughty
- Keaton Ellerby
- Thomas Hickey
- Logan Pyett
- Luke Schenn
- Ty Wishart

Forward

- Zachary Boychuk
- Cory Emmerton
- Sam Gagner (A)
- Colton Gillies
- Claude Giroux
- Zach Hamill
- Stefan Legein
- Milan Lucic (C)
- Brad Marchand
- David Perron
- Brandon Sutter (A)
- John Tavares
- Kyle Turris
- Dana Tyrell

=== 2007 World Junior Ice Hockey Championship ===
Head coach: Craig Hartsburg

Goaltender

- Leland Irving
- Carey Price

Defence

- Karl Alzner
- Luc Bourdon
- Cody Franson
- Kris Letang
- Ryan Parent
- Kris Russell
- Marc Staal

Forward

- Dan Bertram
- Marc–André Cliche
- Andrew Cogliano
- Steve Downie
- Sam Gagner
- Darren Helm
- Bryan Little
- Brad Marchand
- Kenndal McArdle
- James Neal
- Ryan O'Marra
- Tom Pyatt
- Jonathan Toews

=== 2006 World Junior Ice Hockey Championship ===
- Head coach: Brent Sutter

Goaltender

- Devan Dubnyk
- Justin Pogge

Defence

- Cam Barker
- Luc Bourdon
- Kris Letang
- Ryan Parent
- Sasha Pokulok
- Kris Russell
- Marc Staal

Forward

- Dan Bertram
- Michael Blunden
- David Bolland
- Dustin Boyd
- Kyle Chipchura
- Andrew Cogliano
- Blake Comeau
- Steve Downie
- Guillaume Latendresse
- Ryan O'Marra
- Benoît Pouliot
- Tom Pyatt
- Jonathan Toews

=== 2005 World Junior Ice Hockey Championship ===
- Head coach: Brent Sutter

Goaltender

- Rejean Beauchemin
- Jeff Glass

Defence

- Cam Barker
- Shawn Belle
- Braydon Coburn
- Dion Phaneuf
- Brent Seabrook
- Danny Syvret
- Shea Weber

Forward

- Patrice Bergeron
- Jeff Carter
- Jeremy Colliton
- Sidney Crosby
- Nigel Dawes
- Stephen Dixon
- Colin Fraser
- Ryan Getzlaf
- Andrew Ladd
- Clarke MacArthur
- Corey Perry
- Mike Richards
- Anthony Stewart

=== 2004 World Junior Ice Hockey Championship ===
- Head coach: Mario Durocher

Goaltender

- Marc–André Fleury
- Josh Harding

Defence

- Derek Meech
- Dion Phaneuf
- Josh Gorges
- Kevin Klein
- Braydon Coburn
- Brent Seabrook
- Shawn Belle

Forward

- Tim Brent
- Jeff Carter
- Anthony Stewart
- Ryan Getzlaf
- Daniel Paille
- Mike Richards
- Jeff Tambellini
- Jeremy Colliton
- Brent Burns
- Stephen Dixon
- Maxime Talbot
- Nigel Dawes
- Sidney Crosby

=== 2003 World Junior Ice Hockey Championship ===
- Head coach: Marc Habscheid

Goaltender

- Marc–André Fleury
- David LeNeveu

Defence

- Brendan Bell
- Carlo Colaiacovo
- Steve Eminger
- Alexandre Rouleau
- Nathan Paetsch
- Ian White
- Jeff Woywitka

Forward

- Pierre–Marc Bouchard
- Gregory Campbell
- Boyd Gordon
- Brooks Laich
- Joffrey Lupul
- Jay McClement
- Daniel Paille
- P. A. Parenteau
- Derek Roy
- Matt Stajan
- Jordin Tootoo
- Scottie Upshall
- Kyle Wellwood

=== 2002 World Junior Ice Hockey Championship ===
- Head coach: Stan Butler

Goaltender

- Pascal Leclaire
- Olivier Michaud

Defence

- Jay Bouwmeester
- Carlo Colaiacovo
- Dan Hamhuis
- Jay Harrison
- Nathan Paetsch
- Mark Popovic
- Nick Schultz

Forward

- Jared Aulin
- Brad Boyes
- Mike Cammalleri
- Chuck Kobasew
- Jay McClement
- Garth Murray
- Rick Nash
- Steve Ott
- Jason Spezza
- Jarret Stoll
- Brian Sutherby
- Scottie Upshall
- Stephen Weiss

=== 2001 World Junior Ice Hockey Championship ===
- Head coach: Stan Butler

Goaltender

- Alex Auld
- Maxime Ouellet

Defence

- Jay Bouwmeester
- Dan Hamhuis
- Jay Harrison
- Barrett Jackman
- Steve McCarthy
- Mark Popovic
- Nick Schultz

Forward

- Brad Boyes
- Michael Cammalleri
- Dany Heatley
- Jason Jaspers
- Jamie Lundmark
- Derek MacKenzie
- David Morisset
- Steve Ott
- Brandon Reid
- Jason Spezza
- Jarret Stoll
- Raffi Torres
- Michael Zigomanis

=== 2000 World Junior Ice Hockey Championship ===
- Head coach: Claude Julien

Goaltender

- Brian Finley
- Maxime Ouellet

Defence

- Mathieu Biron
- Jay Bouwmeester
- Barrett Jackman
- Matt Kinch
- Steve McCarthy
- Kyle Rossiter
- Joe Rullier

Forward

- Mark Bell
- Tyler Bouck
- Eric Chouinard
- Dany Heatley
- Jamie Lundmark
- Manny Malhotra
- Chris Nielsen
- Matt Pettinger
- Brandon Reid
- Mike Ribeiro
- Brad Richards
- Michael Ryder
- Jason Spezza

=== 1999 World Junior Ice Hockey Championship ===
- Head coach: Tom Renney

Goaltender

- Brian Finley
- Roberto Luongo

Defence

- Bryan Allen
- Brian Campbell
- Brad Ference
- Andrew Ference
- Robyn Regehr
- Brad Stuart
- Mike Van Ryn

Forward

- Blair Betts
- Tyler Bouck
- Kyle Calder
- Jason Chimera
- Harold Druken
- Rico Fata
- Simon Gagné
- Brad Leeb
- Adam Mair
- Kent McDonell
- Brenden Morrow
- Daniel Tkaczuk
- Jason Ward

=== 1998 World Junior Ice Hockey Championship ===
- Head coach: Real Paiement

Goaltender

- Roberto Luongo
- Mathieu Garon

Defence

- Brad Ference
- Eric Brewer
- Jesse Wallin
- Zenith Komarniski
- Sean Blanchard
- Cory Sarich
- Mike Van Ryn

Forward

- Manny Malhotra
- Daniel Tkaczuk
- Steve Bégin
- Matt Cooke
- Vincent Lecavalier
- Daniel Corso
- Brett McLean
- J. P. Dumont
- Alex Tanguay
- Jason Ward
- Josh Holden
- Brian Willsie
- Matt Bradley

=== 1997 World Junior Ice Hockey Championship ===
- Head coach: Mike Babcock

Goaltender

- Martin Biron
- Marc Denis

Defence

- Jason Doig
- Hugh Hamilton
- Richard Jackman
- Chris Phillips
- Cory Sarich
- Jesse Wallin
- Jeff Ware

Forward

- Daniel Brière
- Boyd Devereaux
- Christian Dubé
- Dwayne Hay
- Brad Isbister
- Brad Larsen
- Trevor Letowski
- Cameron Mann
- Alyn McCauley
- Peter Schaefer
- Joe Thornton
- Trent Whitfield
- Shane Willis

=== 1996 World Junior Ice Hockey Championship ===
- Head coach: Marcel Comeau

Goaltender

- Marc Denis
- José Théodore

Defence

- Chad Allan
- Nolan Baumgartner
- Denis Gauthier
- Jason Holland
- Chris Phillips
- Wade Redden
- Rhett Warrener

Forward

- Jason Botterill
- Curtis Brown
- Hnat Domenichelli
- Christian Dubé
- Robb Gordon
- Jarome Iginla
- Daymond Langkow
- Brad Larsen
- Alyn McCauley
- Craig Mills
- Jason Podollan
- Mike Watt
- Jamie Wright

=== 1995 World Junior Ice Hockey Championship ===
- Head coach: Don Hay

Goaltender

- Dan Cloutier
- Jamie Storr

Defence

- Chad Allan
- Nolan Baumgartner
- Ed Jovanovski
- Bryan McCabe
- Wade Redden
- Jamie Rivers
- Lee Sorochan

Forward

- Jason Allison
- Jason Botterill
- Larry Courville
- Alexandre Daigle
- Éric Dazé
- Shean Donovan
- Jeff Friesen
- Todd Harvey
- Marty Murray
- Jeff O'Neill
- Denis Pederson
- Ryan Smyth
- Darcy Tucker

=== 1994 World Junior Ice Hockey Championship ===
- Head coach: Jos Canale

Goaltender

- Manny Fernandez
- Jamie Storr

Defence

- Chris Armstrong
- Drew Bannister
- Joel Bouchard
- Bryan McCabe
- Nick Stajduhar
- Brent Tully
- Brendan Witt

Forward

- Jason Allison
- Jason Botterill
- Curtis Bowen
- Anson Carter
- Brandon Convery
- Yannick Dubé
- Jeff Friesen
- Aaron Gavey
- Martin Gendron
- Rick Girard
- Todd Harvey
- Marty Murray
- Michael Peca

=== 1993 World Junior Ice Hockey Championship ===
- Head coach: Perry Pearn
- Assistant coaches: Jos Canale, Dave Siciliano

Goaltender

- Philippe DeRouville
- Manny Legace

Defence

- Adrian Aucoin
- Joel Bouchard
- Chris Pronger
- Mike Rathje
- Jason Smith
- Brent Tully
- Darcy Werenka

Forward

- Jeff Bes
- Alexandre Daigle
- Jason Dawe
- Martin Gendron
- Chris Gratton
- Ralph Intranuovo
- Paul Kariya
- Nathan LaFayette
- Martin Lapointe
- Dean McAmmond
- Rob Niedermayer
- Jeff Shantz
- Tyler Wright

=== 1992 World Junior Ice Hockey Championship ===
- Head coach: Rick Cornacchia

Goaltender

- Mike Fountain
- Trevor Kidd

Defence

- Brad Bombardir
- Jassen Cullimore
- Karl Dykhuis
- Richard Matvichuk
- Scott Niedermayer
- John Slaney
- Darryl Sydor

Forward

- Kimbi Daniels
- Ryan Hughes
- Steve Junker
- Paul Kariya
- Martin Lapointe
- Eric Lindros
- Jeff Nelson
- Chad Penney
- Patrick Poulin
- Andy Schneider
- Turner Stevenson
- David St. Pierre
- Tyler Wright

=== 1991 World Junior Ice Hockey Championship ===
- Head coach: Dick Todd

Goaltender

- Trevor Kidd
- Félix Potvin

Defence

- Patrice Brisebois
- Karl Dykhuis
- David Harlock
- Jason Marshall
- Scott Niedermayer
- John Slaney
- Chris Snell

Forward

- Mike Craig
- Dale Craigwell
- Kris Draper
- Pat Falloon
- Greg Johnson
- Martin Lapointe
- Eric Lindros
- Kent Manderville
- Brad May
- Steven Rice
- Pierre Sévigny
- Mike Sillinger
- Scott Thornton

=== 1990 World Junior Ice Hockey Championship ===
- Head coach: Guy Charron

Goaltender

- Stéphane Fiset
- Trevor Kidd

Defence

- Patrice Brisebois
- Kevin Haller
- Jason Herter
- Stewart Malgunas
- Adrien Plavsic
- Dan Ratushny

Forward

- Stu Barnes
- Dave Chyzowski
- Mike Craig
- Kris Draper
- Eric Lindros
- Kent Manderville
- Mike Needham
- Dwayne Norris
- Scott Pellerin
- Mike Ricci
- Steven Rice
- Wes Walz

=== 1989 World Junior Ice Hockey Championship ===
- Head coach: Tom Webster
- Rod Brind'Amour
- Andrew Cassels
- Rob Cimetta
- Éric Desjardins
- Stéphane Fiset
- Corey Foster
- Martin Gélinas
- Sheldon Kennedy
- Dan Lambert
- Jamie Leach
- Darcy Loewen
- John McIntyre
- Gus Morschauser
- Rob Murphy
- Yves Racine
- Mike Ricci
- Reggie Savage
- Darrin Shannon
- Geoff Smith
- Steve Veilleux

=== 1988 World Junior Ice Hockey Championship ===
- Head coach: Dave Chambers
- Warren Babe
- Rob Brown
- Dan Currie
- Éric Desjardins
- Rob DiMaio
- Theoren Fleury (C)
- Adam Graves
- Jeff Hackett
- Greg Hawgood
- Jody Hull
- Chris Joseph
- Sheldon Kennedy
- Marc Laniel
- Trevor Linden
- Wayne McBean
- Scott McCrady
- Mark Pederson
- Mark Recchi
- Joe Sakic
- Jimmy Waite

=== 1987 World Junior Ice Hockey Championship ===
- Head coach: Bert Templeton
- Steve Chiasson (C)
- Yvon Corriveau
- Pat Elynuik
- Theoren Fleury
- Greg Hawgood
- Kerry Huffman
- Chris Joseph
- Mike Keane
- David Latta
- Dave McLlwain
- Scott Metcalfe
- Steve Nemeth
- Luke Richardson
- Stéphane Roy
- Everett Sanipass
- Brendan Shanahan
- Shawn Simpson
- Pierre Turgeon
- Jimmy Waite
- Glen Wesley

=== 1986 World Junior Ice Hockey Championship ===
- Head coach: Terry Simpson
- Craig Billington
- Sean Burke
- Terry Carkner
- Al Conroy
- Shayne Corson
- Alain Côté
- Sylvain Côté
- Peter Douris
- Jeff Greenlaw
- Derek Laxdal
- Scott Mellanby
- Dave Moylan
- Joe Murphy
- Joe Nieuwendyk
- Selmar Odelein
- Gary Roberts
- Luc Robitaille
- Jim Sandlak (C)
- Mike Stapleton
- Emanuel Viveiros

=== 1985 World Junior Ice Hockey Championship ===
- Head coach: Terry Simpson
- Bob Bassen
- Yves Beaudoin
- Brad Berry
- Jeff Beukeboom
- Craig Billington
- Brian Bradley
- Wendel Clark
- Shayne Corson
- Adam Creighton
- Bobby Dollas
- Norm Foster
- Dan Gratton
- Dan Hodgson
- Jeff Jackson
- Greg Johnston
- Claude Lemieux
- John Miner
- Selmar Odelein
- Stéphane Richer
- Jim Sandlak

=== 1984 World Junior Ice Hockey Championship ===
- Head coach: Brian Kilrea
- Allan Bester
- Lyndon Byers
- Bruce Cassidy
- Sylvain Côté
- Yves Courteau
- Russ Courtnall
- J. J. Daigneault
- Dale Derkatch
- Gerald Diduck
- Dean Evason
- Dave Gagner
- Randy Heath
- Dan Hodgson
- Gary Lacey
- Gary Leeman
- John MacLean
- Kirk Muller
- Mark Paterson
- Brad Shaw
- Ken Wregget

=== 1983 World Junior Ice Hockey Championship ===
- Head coach: Dave King
- Dave Andreychuk
- Paul Boutilier
- Joe Cirella
- Paul Cyr
- Dale Derkatch
- Mike Eagles
- Patrick Flatley
- Gary Leeman
- Mario Lemieux
- Mark Morrison
- James Patrick
- Mike Sands
- Brad Shaw
- Gord Sherven
- Tony Tanti
- Larry Trader
- Sylvain Turgeon
- Pat Verbeek
- Mike Vernon
- Steve Yzerman

=== 1982 World Junior Ice Hockey Championship ===
- Head coach: Dave King
- Scott Arniel
- Paul Boutilier
- Garth Butcher
- Frank Caprice
- Paul Cyr
- Bruce Eakin
- Marc Habscheid
- Gord Kluzak
- Moe Lemay
- Mike Moffat
- Mike Moller
- Randy Moller
- Dave Morrison
- Mark Morrison
- Troy Murray
- Gary Nylund
- James Patrick
- Pierre Rioux
- Todd Strueby
- Carey Wilson

=== 1981 World Junior Ice Hockey Championship ===
Cornwall Royals*

- Head coach: Bob Kilger
- Scott Arniel
- Fred Arthur
- Fred Boimistruck
- Eric Calder
- Bill Campbell
- André Chartrain
- Marc Crawford
- Denis Cyr
- Gilbert Delorme
- Jeff Eatough
- Guy Fournier
- Jean–Marc Gaulin
- Doug Gilmour
- Tom Graovac
- Craig Halliday
- Dale Hawerchuk
- John Kirk
- Corrado Micalef
- Roy Russell
- Robert Savard

=== 1980 World Junior Ice Hockey Championship ===
Peterborough Petes*

- Head coach: Mike Keenan
- Dave Beckon
- Terry Bovair
- Dino Ciccarelli
- Carmine Cirella
- Doug Crossman
- Dave Fenyves
- Jim Fox
- Bill Gardner
- Andre Hidi
- Yvon Joly
- Bill Kitchen
- Rick Lanz
- Rick LaFerriere
- Larry Murphy
- Mark Reeds
- Brad Ryder
- Sean Simpson
- Stuart Smith
- Jim Wiemer
- Terry Wright

=== 1979 World Junior Ice Hockey Championship ===
New Westminster Bruins*

- Head coach: Punch McLean
- Keith Brown
- Boris Fistric
- Bill Hobbins
- Bruce Howes
- Yvan Joly
- John–Paul Kelly
- Terry Kirkham
- Gary Lupul
- Randy Irving
- Scott MacLeod
- Brad McCrimmon
- Rollie Melanson
- Larry Melnyk
- John Ogrodnick
- Dave Orleski
- Brian Propp
- Errol Rausse
- Kent Reardon
- Tom Semenchuk

=== 1978 World Junior Ice Hockey Championship ===
- Head coach: Punch McLean
- Wayne Babych
- Tim Bernhardt
- Pat Daley
- Curt Fraser
- Mike Gartner
- Wayne Gretzky
- Craig Hartsburg
- Willie Huber
- Al Jensen
- Brad Marsh
- Brad McCrimmon
- Tony McKegney
- Rick Paterson
- Rob Ramage
- Bobby Smith
- Stan Smyl
- Steve Tambellini
- Rick Vaive
- Ryan Walter
- Brian Young

=== 1977 World Junior Ice Hockey Championship ===
St. Catharines Fincups*

- Head coach: Bert Templeton
- John Anderson
- Joe Contini
- Bob Daly
- Ron Duguay
- Mike Forbes
- Steve Hazlett
- Dwight Foster
- Dennis Houle
- Willie Huber
- Dave Hunter
- Al Jensen
- Trevor Johansen
- Mike Keating
- Brad Marsh
- Dale McCourt
- Mark Plantery
- Rob Ramage
- Al Secord
- Ric Seiling
- Geoff Shaw

=== 1976 World Junior Ice Hockey Championship ===
Sherbrooke Beavers

- Head coach: Ghislain Delage
- Alain Belanger
- Joe Carlevale
- Ron Carter
- Dan Chicoine
- Mario Claude
- Robert Desormeaux
- Jere Gillis
- Mark Green
- Denis Halle
- Bernie Harbec
- Ken Johnston
- Floyd Lahache
- Fern LeBlanc
- Normand Lefebvre
- Brendan Lowe
- Peter Marsh
- Benoît Perreault
- Richard Sevigny
- Robert Simpson
- Regis Vallieres

=== 1975 World Junior Ice Hockey Championship ===
WCHL All–Stars

- Head coach: Jackie McLeod
- Danny Arndt
- Rick Blight
- Mel Bridgman
- Blair Davidson
- Mark Davidson
- Rob Flockhart
- Kelly Greenbank
- Larry Hendrick
- Rick Hodgson
- Ralph Klassen
- Rick Lapointe
- Bryan Maxwell
- Kevin McCarthy
- Terry McDonald
- Dale McMullin
- Jim Minor
- Clayton Pachal
- Robin Sadler
- Barry Smith
- Doug Soetaert
- Ed Staniowski
- Brian Sutter
- Bryan Trottier
- Greg Vaydik

=== 1974 World Junior Ice Hockey Championship ===
Peterborough Petes

- Head coach: Roger Neilson
- John Ayotte
- Tony Cassolato
- Gord Duncan
- Paul Evans
- Bill Evo
- Mike Fryia
- Tom Gastle
- Doug Halward
- Doug Jarvis
- Stan Jonathan
- Mike Kasmetis
- Don Laurence
- Paul McIntosh
- Brad Pirie
- Ed Pizunski
- Frank Salive
- Peter Scamurra
- Ed Smith
- Jim Turkiewicz
- Bobby Wasson

(*) denotes: Clubs that represented Canada between 1977 and 1981 (excluding 1978) were allowed to augment their roster with 7 skaters and 1 goalie of Canadian birth from any club.

== See also ==
- Ice hockey at the 2006 Winter Olympics
- Ice hockey at the 2006 Winter Olympics match stats (women)
- Ice hockey
- Ice hockey statistics
