= George Dudley =

Canadian ice hockey administrator (1894–1960)

- Born: April 19, 1894; Midland, Ontario, Canada
- Died: May 8, 1960 (aged 66); Midland, Ontario, Canada
- Education: Osgoode Hall Law School
- Occupations: Lawyer, solicitor
- Known for: Canadian Amateur Hockey Association; Ontario Hockey Association; International Ice Hockey Federation; International Ice Hockey Association
- Awards: Hockey Hall of Fame
- Honours: Dudley Hewitt Cup

George Samuel Dudley QC (April 19, 1894 – May 8, 1960) was a Canadian ice hockey administrator. He joined the Ontario Hockey Association (OHA) executive in 1928, served as its president from 1934 to 1936, and as its treasurer from 1936 to 1960. He was elected to Canadian Amateur Hockey Association (CAHA) executive in 1936, served as its president from 1940 to 1942, as its secretary from 1945 to 1947, and as its secretary-manager from 1947 to 1960. He was secretary of the International Ice Hockey Association from 1945 to 1947, and was later vice-president of the International Ice Hockey Federation (IIHF) from 1957 to 1960. He was expected to become the next president of the IIHF before his death. He graduated from Osgoode Hall Law School in 1917 then practiced law for 43 years as the town solicitor for Midland, Ontario.

Dudley and W. G. Hardy led the way in revising the definition of an amateur hockey player to keep amateur players in Canada and slow the number of Canadians turning professional. Dudley negotiated deals with the National Hockey League and the British Ice Hockey Association to govern the transfer of players internationally. He introduced contracts for junior ice hockey players, as a means to obtain development payments from professional teams seeking new talent. He supported an alliance between the CAHA and the Amateur Hockey Association of the United States (AHAUS), and sought for international recognition of AHAUS as the governing body of ice hockey in the United States. He threatened to withdraw Canada from ice hockey at the Olympic Games if the International Olympic Committee did not accept the Canadian definition of amateur, and supported the IIHF hosting its own Ice Hockey World Championships separate from the Olympics. Dudley's role as secretary-manager of the CAHA made him influential in Canadian hockey since he served as the regular delegate to IIHF meetings, and was in charge of selecting the Canada men's national team. He facilitated the first exhibition tour by the Soviet Union national team in Canada, and oversaw ice hockey at the 1960 Winter Olympics on behalf of the IIHF

Dudley was committed to implementing reforms for amateur hockey, believing that they were in the best interest of hockey in Canada. He was opposed to governments funding or controlling amateur sports associations, and supported the continuation of hockey and incorporating Royal Canadian Air Force teams into the CAHA as a morale boost during World War II. Dudley was described by journalist Jack Sullivan as a staunch and shrewd hockey official and a problem solver. Journalist Scott Young stated Dudley was a low-key figure at first who grew to prominence by his reputation as being a busy and able volunteer. Young further stated that Dudley was a forward thinker, and had the ability to listen to a conversation and find a compromise without forcing anyone to change his mind. Young credited Dudley for dealing with reforms to amateurism, and regulations on player salaries and transfers, which led to increased interest in hockey.

Dudley was inducted to the builder category of the Hockey Hall of Fame in 1958, and was posthumously inducted into the Midland Sports Hall of Fame in 1996. He was made a life member of both the CAHA and OHA, received the Gold Stick award from the OHA in recognition of service to hockey in Ontario and the AHAUS citation award for service to amateur hockey in the United States. He was named to the selection committee for the Hockey Hall of Fame, and previously sat on the same committee for the Original Hockey Hall of Fame. He and W. A. Hewitt were made the namesakes of the Dudley Hewitt Cup, first awarded by the Canadian Junior Hockey League in 1971.

== Early life and legal career ==
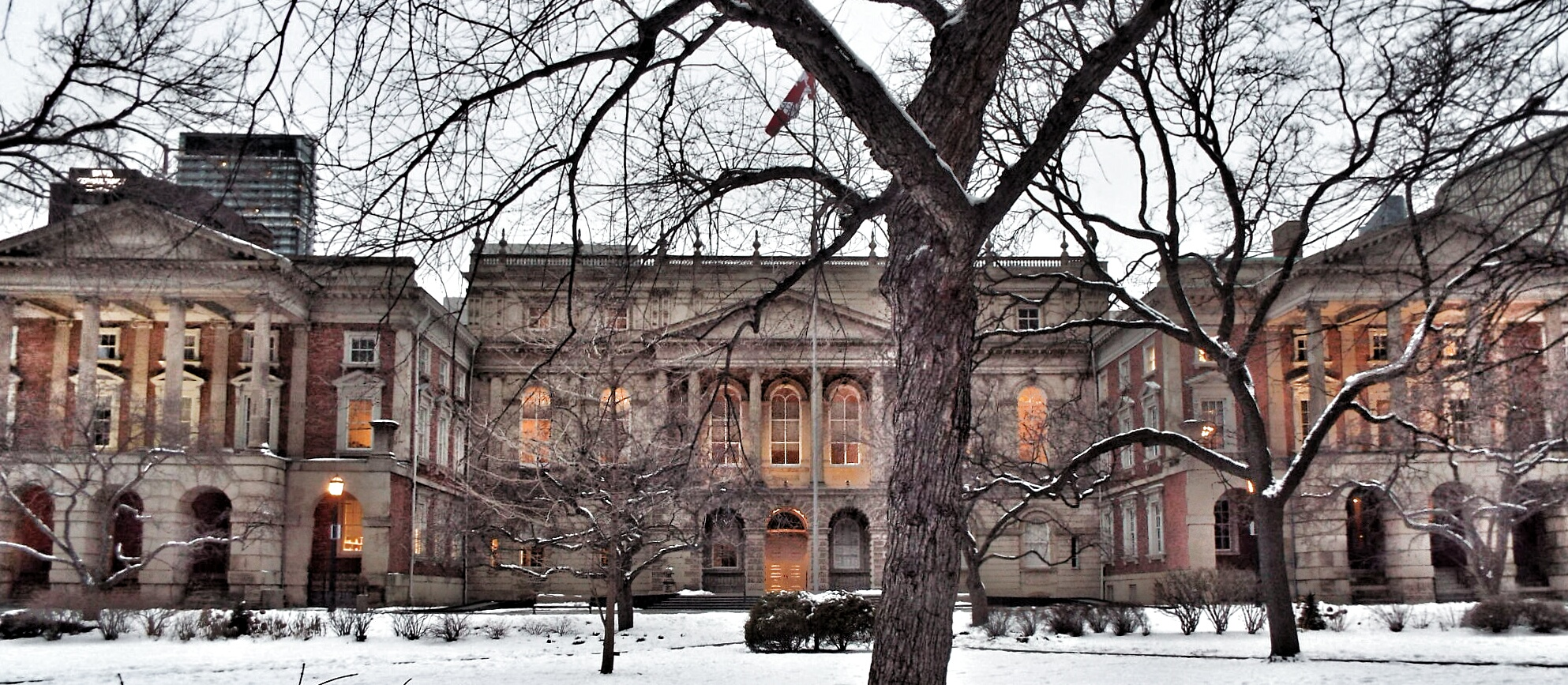
Osgoode Hall Law School in Toronto

George Samuel Dudley was born on April 19, 1894, in Midland, Ontario. His parents were William Thomas Dudley, and Sarah Agnes Dudley (née Brown). His father served 37 years on the local public utilities commission. Dudley grew up playing minor ice hockey in Midland, but poor eyesight prevented him from a further athletic career.

Dudley attended Midland Secondary School, then graduated from Osgoode Hall Law School in 1917. While studying law, he served as an articled clerk for the local member of parliament, William Humphrey Bennett. Dudley entered into a law practice in a partnership with William Finlayson in 1917. They established at Finlayson & Dudley, Barristers and Solicitors at 212 King Street in Midland. Dudley took over the firm upon Finlayson's death in 1943. He practiced law for 43 years as the town's solicitor until 1960.

== Early hockey career ==
Dudley first attended Ontario Hockey Association (OHA) meetings in 1925. He was elected an executive member of the OHA in November 1928, and urged the OHA to reassert its jurisdiction over all hockey in Ontario and its intention to introduce associate memberships to regulate leagues under its domain. He was an early advocate of professional hockey coaches in the amateur game, and supported the reforms by W. A. Hewitt to allow them.

At the OHA general meeting in 1930, Dudley supported measures to bring attention to rules already in place which did not allow players with an active professional contract in the OHA. He successfully campaigned for the construction of a new arena in Midland in 1931, to replace the previous structure lost in 1926. Dudley oversaw construction of the Midland Arena Gardens by autumn 1931 during the Great Depression, and it became the only artificial ice rink between Toronto and Winnipeg at the time.

== OHA president ==
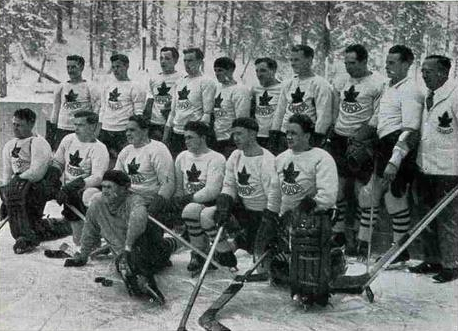
Dudley pushed for a new definition of amateur, in the wake of Canada not winning the gold medal in ice hockey at the 1936 Winter Olympics hosted in Garmisch-Partenkirchen.

Dudley served as president of the OHA from 1934 to 1936. In 1934, he advocated for ratification of the first Canadian Amateur Hockey Association (CAHA) agreement with the National Hockey League (NHL), regarding player control and compensation to the junior clubs for developing the player. To gain the financial concessions, the CAHA conceded to allow body checking in the neutral zone, and use the same ice hockey rules as the professional league. Dudley later introduced a motion at the OHA general meeting to adopt the same playing rules as the NHL.

At the CAHA general meeting in 1935, Dudley stated it was important to keep younger players amateurs as long as possible, and prevent professionalism at a young age which excluded them from the OHA. He felt that once a player reached age 21, he would have gained the knowledge to make an informed decision on his future. Dudley felt that OHA needed to be offer financial opportunities competitive with what was available elsewhere. He was nominated by CAHA president E. A. Gilroy, to be part of a special committee dealing with the Amateur Athletic Union of Canada (AAU of C) to discuss the definition of amateur, the cost of player registration cards, and the right for the CAHA to issue its own registration cards.

In October 1935, Dudley stated that the number of players leaving for the United States was compromising rosters in Canada, and that the rate of exodus was not sustainable. He decreed that the OHA would decline all player transfer requests to the United States, and players not returning to Canada by November 15, would be suspended from the OHA. He began to put rules in place for the transfer of players internationally, and stated that, "It's going to happen. We might as well try to regulate it". Dudley and CAHA second vice-president W. G. Hardy negotiated agreements with the NHL, and the British Ice Hockey Association (BIHA) to govern the transfer of players and prevent the raiding of Canadian rosters. Limits were placed on the number of allowed transfers, and the organizations agreed to recognize each other's authority and suspensions.

Dudley and Hardy soon began a campaign to rewrite the definition of amateur, to decrease the number of amateurs from turning professional. They felt that the requirement to have an AAU of C registration card to play in the OHA, and the Olympic Games, was an obstacle to progress, and made the AAU of C their main target of reforms. At the AAU of C general meeting in November 1935, Dudley supported a defeated resolution to drop the word amateur from the AAU of C name. At the same meeting, Dudley and Hardy presented "four points" to update the definition of amateur, as supported by the CAHA's special committee dealing with the AAU of C.

The "four points" were:

1. Hockey players may capitalize on their ability as hockey players for the purpose of obtaining legitimate employment.
2. Hockey players may accept from their clubs or employers payment for time lost, from work while competing on behalf of their clubs. They will not however, be allowed to hold "shadow" jobs under the clause.
3. Amateur hockey teams may play exhibition games against professional teams under such conditions as may be laid down by the individual branches of the CAHA.
4. Professionals in another sport will be allowed to play under the CAHA jurisdiction as amateurs.

The AAU of C promptly voted down the proposals. At the same meeting, the AAU of C decided upon Canada's representation in ice hockey at the 1936 Winter Olympics. The 1935 Allan Cup champion Halifax Wolverines were unable to go, unless financial provisions were made for their families. Since the AAU of C did not condone payment for lost wages while away at competitions, the Allan Cup finalists Port Arthur Bearcats were chosen. Canada failed to win the Olympic gold medal due to a loss to the Great Britain men's national team. Dudley stated that the CAHA should face realities, and that the Canadian public was sympathetic to compensating and supporting its Olympic ice hockey players while overseas.

At the 1936 CAHA general meeting, Dudley and Hardy presented the four points, which were adopted by the CAHA. In doing so, the CAHA took its stand against the definition of amateurism, and recognized that players should receive compensation. The stand meant the likelihood of breaking ties with the AAU of C. The Winnipeg Tribune reported that support for the "four points" was strong, and that the "old guard" of amateurism supported by AAU of C president W. A. Fry would eventually lose. Dudley stated that common sense had not prevailed in previous AAU of C discussions on the matter. Fry stated that the decision was "the most important matter ever to come before an amateur body in Canada", and that "It would be a sorry day for the AAU of C should it split with its strongest supporter, the CAHA. As a former CAHA president, he sympathized with the resolution, but did not give approval.

== CAHA second vice-president ==
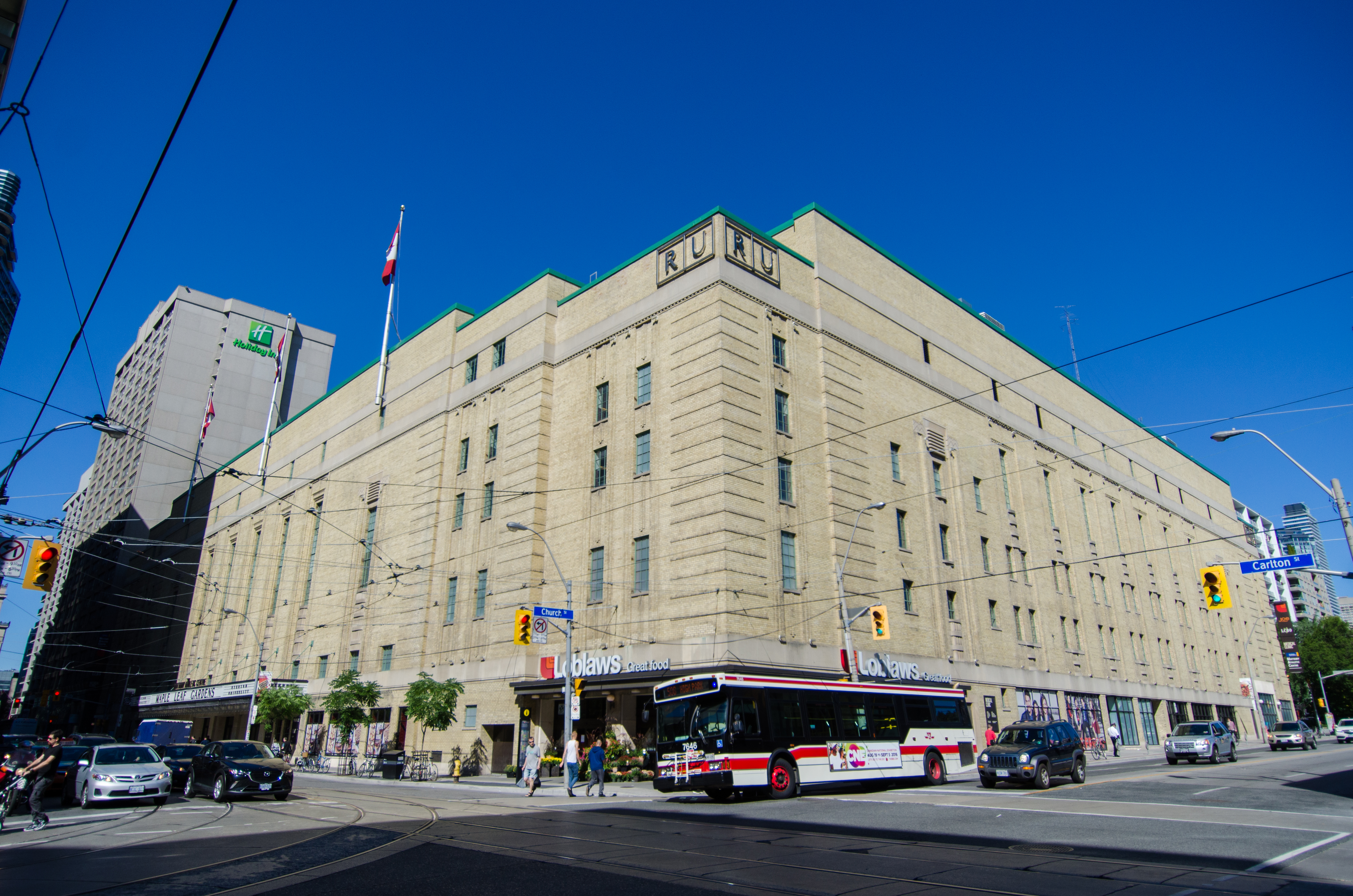
Maple Leaf Gardens hosted many hockey matches scheduled by Dudley.

Dudley was elected second vice-president of the CAHA in April 1936. The CAHA decided to go ahead with reforms to the definition of amateur regardless of the outcome of an AAU of C mail-in vote on the matter. In May 1936, Fry decided against holding AAU of C vote on the matter, which led to Dudley referring to Fry as "Somersault Bill".

Dudley assumed the role of treasurer of the OHA in October 1936, to succeed J. F. Paxton who died on May 12, 1936. Dudley functioned as OHA's treasurer until 1960, in addition to his roles with the CAHA. He reported an operating loss of C$5,662 in 1936, due to increased expenses and decreased revenue, after the OHA had experienced many years with a surplus.

Dudley and Hardy presented the "four points" again at the 1936 AAU of C general meeting. Dudley and Hardy advocated for broken time payments, since players were reliant on income to support their families, and that being away from work for six weeks at a time for international competition or national playoffs constituted a hardship. They were committed to change believing that the reforms were in the best interest of hockey in Canada, and were empowered the CAHA executive to act as it saw fit on the matter. Journalist Ralph Allen stated that public opinion had turned in favour of the proposals, and that the AAU of C were relics of a bygone age. The AAU of C voted and approved exhibition games between amateurs and professionals, but rejected the other three points. The CAHA status within the AAU of C was left unclear.

Dudley was re-elected second vice-president of the CAHA at the general meeting in April 1937. Dudley along with CAHA president Cecil Duncan and W. A. Hewitt participated in negotiations with the Eastern Amateur Hockey League (EAHL) represented by Tommy Lockhart in August 1937, a result of the Amateur Athletic Union (AAU) of the United States giving an ultimatum to the EAHL not to have any Canadian players. The EAHL chose to break away from the AAU, similar to the CAHA relationship with the AAU of C, and reached an agreement with the CAHA which limited the number of Canadian players transferring to the league.

In November 1937, Dudley reported that the OHA had returned to a surplus, with an operating profit of $1,422, led by playoffs tickets for the Memorial Cup playoffs. Dudley signed a five-year agreement with Maple Leaf Gardens to be the home rink for all Toronto-based teams in the OHA, except for the University of Toronto teams playing at Varsity Arena. In March 1938, Dudley and W. A. Hewitt met with Frank Calder to discuss the professional-amateur player agreement with the NHL, in response to a protest over a suspended professional player being placed on an amateur roster.

== CAHA first vice-president ==
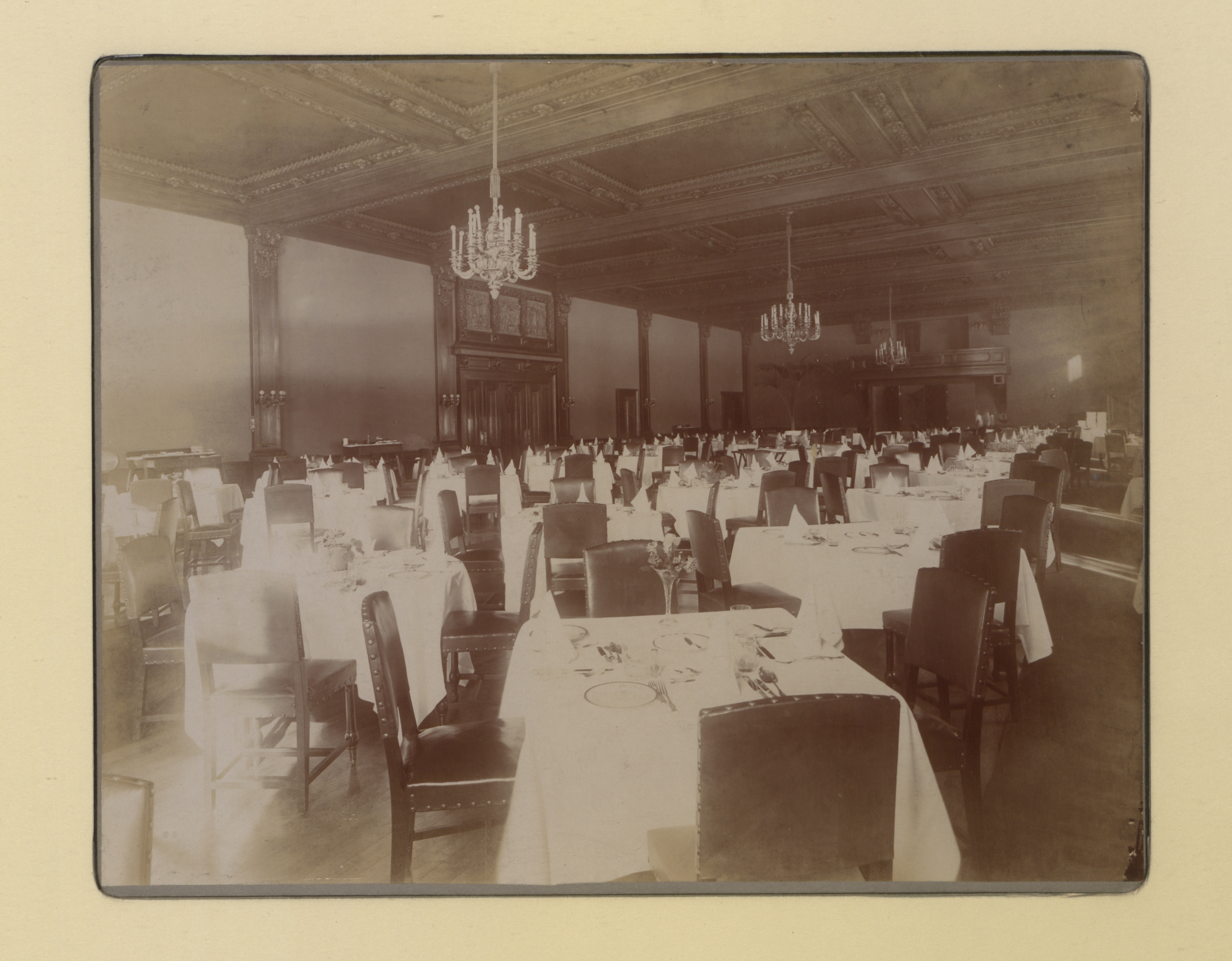
The CAHA's silver jubilee in 1939, was hosted at the Royal Alexandra Hotel (drawing room pictured) in Winnipeg.

On April 18, 1938, Dudley was elected first vice-president of the CAHA. He credited the outgoing president Cecil Duncan for replenishing CAHA financial reserves with more success that his predecessors. Dudley was placed in charge of Eastern Canada playoffs, and appointed chairman of the CAHA resolutions committee.

In August 1938, he participated in CAHA negotiations with the NHL and Frank Calder to reach a new professional-amateur agreement. Agreements were made on playing rules and recognition of each other's suspensions. The CAHA would disallow international transfers for players on NHL reserve lists, and the NHL agreed not to sign any junior players during active CAHA competition, or without consent of the CAHA club.

The CAHA's silver jubilee in 1939, was hosted at the Royal Alexandra Hotel in Winnipeg. Dudley gave the introductory goodwill toast. At the general meeting which followed, he presented a resolution to have contracts for junior ice hockey players. He felt that if a club team had a contract with a player, then it had a legal course of action to request remuneration by way of development fees if the player was signed to a professional team. Lengthy discussion ensued and the idea was approved in principle with a final decision deferred until the 1940 general meeting. Contracts had the added benefit of making professional teams negotiate for amateur services. A signing fee of $500 was proposed, which would be dispersed among the amateur clubs which has developed the player.

Dudley re-elected first vice-president of the CAHA, on April 12, 1939. In November 1939, he expected changes would be made in the playoff structure and compensation of teams for travel, since the financial situations of the CAHA and OHA had improved since the Great Depression. In December 1939, he acted as a goodwill emissary to assist the growth of the Ladies Ontario Hockey Association.

== CAHA president ==
=== First term ===
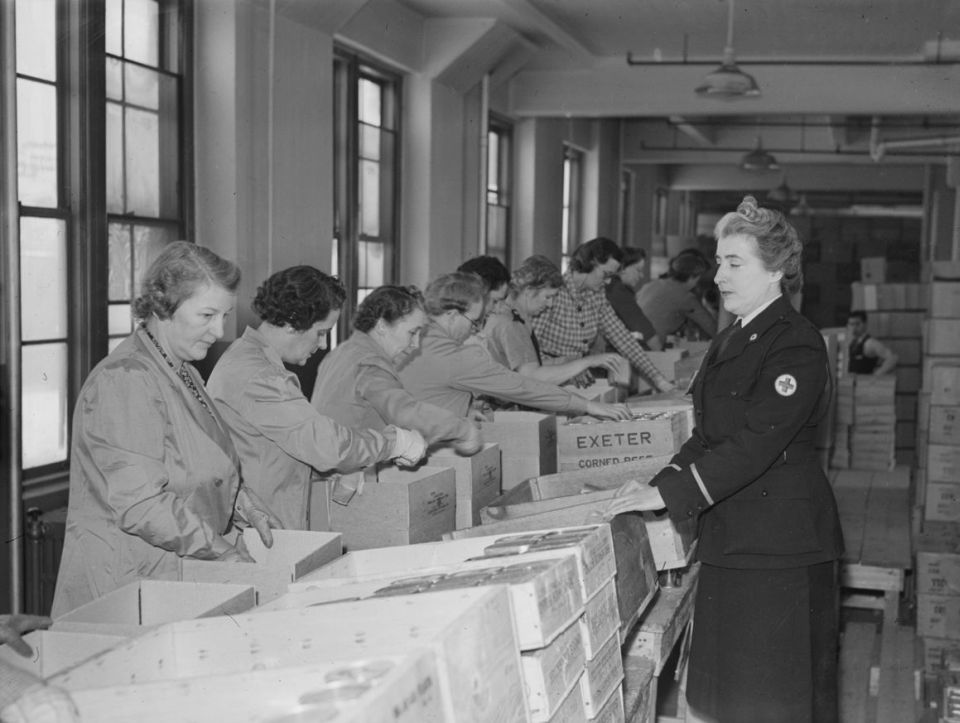
Canadian Red Cross volunteers during World War II.

On April 15, 1940, the CAHA and the Amateur Hockey Association of the United States (AHAUS) agreed to form the International Ice Hockey Association, and invited the BIHA to join. W. G. Hardy became president of the association, and stated that "the purpose of the new association is to promote the game of hockey among the three Anglo-Saxon nations". The new organization replaced the Ligue Internationale de Hockey sur Glace (LIHG) which was inactive due to World War II. Dudley succeeded Hardy as president of the CAHA on April 17, 1940. After Dudley became president, the CAHA definition of amateur was changed to "an amateur hockey player is one who has not engaged in, or is not engaged in, organized professional hockey". The question of whether the International Olympic Committee (IOC) would accept the new definition, was postponed when the 1940 Winter Olympics were cancelled. Dudley later stated, "If the Olympics are revived after the war, Canada will want to send a team, of course. But if our rules prove unacceptable to Olympic officials, I guess we'll stay at home". The decision was the first of several times that Canada threatened to withdraw from ice hockey at the Olympic Games or the Ice Hockey World Championships over regulations on international ice hockey.

In June 1940, the CAHA executive approved a grant of $10,000 to the Government of Canada for the war effort. The CAHA chose to continue operations as usual to maintain the morale of Canadians during the war, and would offer any assistance needed for military sports teams. Dudley asked for provincial branches of the CAHA to assist in organizing a national "hockey night" to raise funds for patriotic services. He later abandoned plans to benefit the Canadian Red Cross, since it was against Red Cross policy to do promotional work.

In September 1940, the International Ice Hockey Association and the NHL reached a new professional-amateur agreement. The NHL promised to pay $500 for each amateur player signed, which included $250 at signing, then another $250 after playing in the NHL. Dudley sat on the committee to oversee relations and player movement with the NHL. The agreement included provisions for tryouts without having to commit, and the reinstatement of a former professional player as an amateur if no professional team claimed him.

Dudley stated at the CAHA executive meeting in January 1941, called for more consistent interpretation of the playing rules with respect to physical play, which was one of the biggest problems facing amateur hockey in Canada. He also stressed that supporting the International Ice Hockey Association was a means to protect the CAHA against the positions of other organizations.

The 1941 CAHA annual meeting was held in Calgary, in conjunction with the International Ice Hockey Association. The constitution was updated to allow for charitable donations and educational grants, and the CAHA to donate 25 per cent of profits from playoffs to wartime charities. Dudley arranged for bonuses to players from the playoffs profits based on the number of games played. Dudley was granted a $1,000 honorarium for expenses for negotiating agreements with the NHL.

=== Second term ===
Dudley donated a portion of profits from the Allan Cup playoffs (trophy pictured) to the Government of Canada for the war effort.

Dudley was re-elected president of the CAHA on April 16, 1941. He and Hardy met with officials from the Quebec Amateur Hockey Association (QAHA) in June 1941, to approve in principle a new playoff scheme overseen by a new committee for the QAHA, the Ottawa District Hockey Association, and the Maritime Amateur Hockey Association. The new committee was proposed to be more financially efficient, give more money to Eastern teams, and to be voted on at the next general meeting.

The CAHA executive approved a $10,000 purchase of victory bonds for the war effort. Dudley reiterated that the CAHA would assist the Canadian government where possible, and would bend the agreement with the NHL to allow for younger players to be signed who were not subject to travel restrictions or military service.

When NHL players were denied passports, the CAHA asked for permission from the NHL reinstate those players temporarily as amateurs. Dudley advised those who wanted to be reinstated as amateurs due to travel restrictions, needed a release from the NHL. The CAHA rules committee formally ratified the NHL rules for use in Canadian amateur leagues, as of October 1941.

Dudley estimated that registration in the CAHA was 25 per cent less than before the war, but stated that the Canadian government still supported the continuation of hockey as a morale boost. He urged for clubs in Canada to have special games to raise funds for war organizations, and for the CAHA branches to incorporate military teams into schedules where possible. In January 1942, the CAHA donated an additional $10,000 to the government for the war effort.

Dudley anticipated a greater demand by the NHL for junior players due to the war, and wished to co-operate. He expected difficulty in operating senior ice hockey next season, and speculated that season schedules and playoffs may need to be shortened due to lack of players, but was committed to continuing hockey. He defended the CAHA policy of reinstating former professionals as amateurs, despite it strengthening Royal Canadian Air Force (RCAF) teams compared to club teams during the wartime. During the war he stated, "young men capable of playing hockey are capable of either being in the armed services or in some necessary industry".

By April 1942, the CAHA and its branches combined donated over $50,000 to the war effort, which included proceeds from Allan Cup and Memorial Cup playoffs, and exhibition games. To save money, the CAHA reduced travel and hospital allowances, and eliminated playoffs series which would not be profitable.

== CAHA past-president ==
Dudley served as a trustee of the Memorial Cup after he was CAHA president.

Dudley assumed the role of CAHA past-president, when he was succeeded by Frank Sargent as president in April 1942. Dudley sat on the relations committee with the NHL, which agreed in principle that an amateur may turn professional at any time due to wartime conditions. In August, he announced plans by Lionel Conacher, the sports director for the RCAF to have teams play in senior ice hockey leagues, based at all RCAF commands across Canada. Dudley was hopeful that the Canadian Army and the Royal Canadian Navy would do the same.

In April 1943, Dudley recommended that payments from the NHL for signing amateurs be deferred until players lost due to the wartime enlistments return to professional hockey. He suggested the adjustment in light of many players enlisting recently after becoming professional. Due to the war, 75 per cent of the amateurs signed by the NHL ended up in the armed services. The CAHA filled out rosters with amateurs exempt from military service who were married men over age 30. The professional-amateur agreement was renegotiated and the NHL agreed to pay a flat rate of $500 to the CAHA. Dudley conceded that the deal was not as good as before, but it was adequate due to the war.

In June 1943, Dudley and Frank Sargent met with the Canadian armed services to discuss future organization of military ice hockey teams in Canada. The RCAF withdrew its teams from the CAHA in January 1944, despite attempts to negotiate a delayed withdrawal at the end of the season. He reported that despite the withdrawal due to a change in armed services policies, praise was given to the CAHA for its assistance. He expected there to be no military service teams competing within the CAHA during the 1944–45 season.

In April 1944, Dudley and W. G. Hardy considered the International Ice Hockey Association overseeing international senior ice hockey championships between the CAHA and AHAUS. In August 1944, the Canadian Press reported Dudley as having "considerable support" to replace Red Dutton as president of the NHL. Similar rumors surfaced again by the Canadian Press in May 1945.

In November 1944, Dudley mediated a dispute between the Quebec Senior Hockey League (QSHL) which began the season without CAHA approval, and the Ottawa District Hockey Association which denied permission for the Ottawa Commandos and a team from Hull, Quebec to play in the QSHL. He decided that no players would be suspended from the CAHA while talks were ongoing. He reached a settlement where a five per cent share of gate receipts from games in Ottawa and Hull were given to the Ottawa District Hockey Association.

== CAHA secretary ==
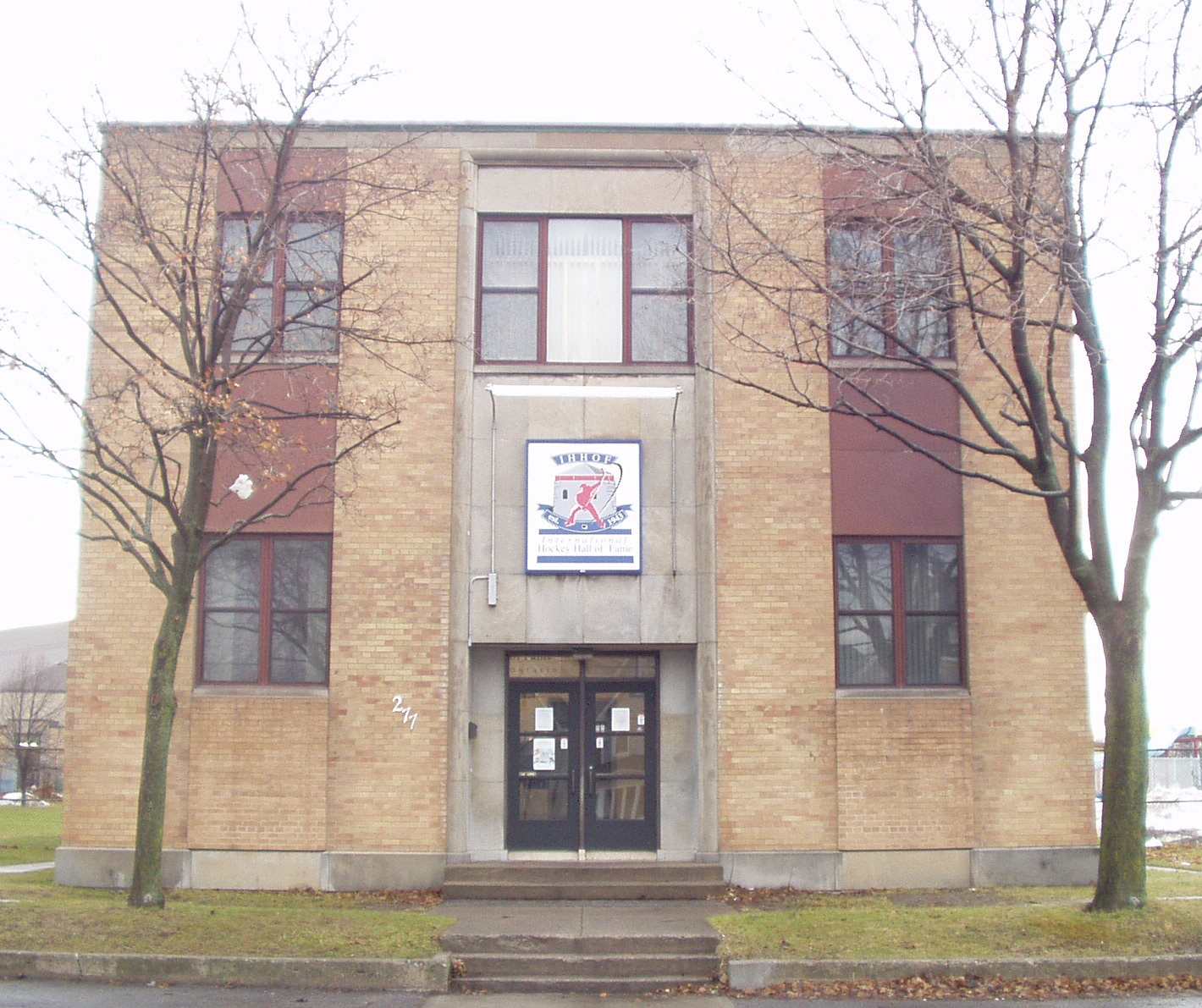
In 1945, Dudley announced CAHA contributions towards the construction of a facility for the Original Hockey Hall of Fame. The building (pictured) opened in 1965, in Kingston, Ontario.

On April 17, 1945, Dudley was elected secretary of the International Ice Hockey Association. On the same day, Dudley was elected secretary of the CAHA to succeed Fred Marples. Dudley's role as past-president was filled by Frank Sargent, when Hanson Dowell became president. The CAHA arranged to give 25 per cent of its annual proceeds towards building a facility for the Original Hockey Hall of Fame, and Dudley expected that amount to be $4,000 to $5,000.

After the war ended, Dudley announced that the CAHA and the NHL would revert to the pre-war agreement not to sign any junior players without permission. He also stated that tryout contracts must be honoured, and junior-aged players on NHL reserve lists must be reinstated as amateurs to return to the CAHA. The wartime practice of the NHL borrowing amateur players for three games or less was discontinued. Dudley participated in discussions to update the financial terms of the agreement. The NHL offered a flat payment of $20,000 to signing amateurs, which Dudley felt it was too low. The CAHA ultimately accepted the lump sum payment, preferring not to break its alliance with the NHL.

Dudley co-operated with transfers to assist European ice hockey associations which struggled to find players after the war. The BIHA did not expect to operate in 1946–47 season, but the Scottish Ice Hockey Association planned to operate with the CAHA loaning players. In December 1946, discussions continued for a proposed merger of the International Ice Hockey Association with the LIHG. Dudley felt that any new organization formed should be predominantly Canadian to have more say in international hockey matters. The CAHA sought to have W. G. Hardy nominated as vice-president of the new governing body, and Dudley as its secretary. The merger was agreed to and CAHA president Al Pickard stated that the CAHA and AHAUS would operate with autonomy. The LIHG recognized AHAUS as the governing body of hockey in the United States instead of the Amateur Athletic Union (AAU). The CAHA was permitted to have its own definition of amateur as long as teams at the Olympic games adhered to existing LIHG rules. The new organization was later renamed to the International Ice Hockey Federation (IIHF).

The Ice Hockey World Championships resumed in 1947, but Dudley had difficulties finding any team willing to represent Canada. He invited the champions and finalists of both the 1946 Allan Cup and 1946 Memorial Cup, but all four teams declined. In addition, the Winnipeg Monarchs declined the CAHA invite for a European tour. Dudley settled on the Edmonton Junior Canadians, who were the Western Canada junior finalists. The Edmonton Junior Canadians declined the offer due to financial concerns that the proposed European tour would be insufficient to cover travel costs. No other team was found, and Canada did not participate in the 1947 Ice Hockey World Championships.

== CAHA secretary-manager ==
The CAHA added the title of manager to the secretary's role in 1947, and Dudley served as secretary-manager of the CAHA until 1960. The new role made Dudley more influential in Canadian hockey since he served as the regular delegate to IIHF meetings, and was in charge of selecting the Canada men's national team and making its travel arrangements to the Ice Hockey World Championships and the Olympic Games. He was named first vice-president of the IIHF and chairman of the North American delegation on July 12, 1957, and facilitated the first exhibition tours for Soviet teams in Canada.

Dudley was named to the selection committee for two hockey halls of fame. In January 1948, the Original Hockey Hall of Fame increased its board of governors from 9 to 16 people to give better representation across North America, and Dudley was chosen as a new board member. In January 1958, he was named as one of the nine persons on the selection committee for the Hockey Hall of Fame in Toronto. The announcement was made after the NHL chose to recognize the Toronto institution instead of the Original Hockey Hall of Fame in Kingston.

=== 1948 Winter Olympics ===
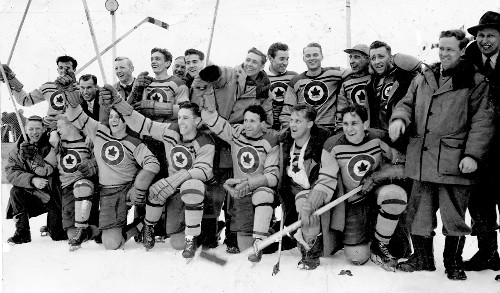
The Ottawa RCAF Flyers team was the CAHA's answer to the IOC's definition of amateur for ice hockey at the 1948 Winter Olympics.

Dudley was faced with a dilemma in choosing the Canadian representative ice hockey at the 1948 Winter Olympics. The Canadian Olympic Association wanted an ice hockey team that suited the IOC definition of amateur. He felt obliged to offer the chance to the 1947 Allan Cup champions Montreal Royals, would not fit the IOC definition of amateur. Dudley gave an ultimatum to the Canadian Olympic Association to accept the team put forth under the CAHA definition of amateur, or look to another organization for a team. He said there should be no "pussyfooting" on the matter, and reiterated that lost salaries by players was a valid concern. In September 1947, he formally invited the Royals to represent Canada, but was unsure if the team would accept.

Dudley attended the IIHF meeting in September to discuss hockey at the Olympics using the IOC definition of amateur, or hosting its own World Championships separate from the Winter Olympics. He remained adamant against the IOC definition and said, "We decided in Canada 11 years ago that there is too much hypocrisy about amateurism and we've seen no reason to change our view". IIHF president Fritz Kraatz reportedly agreed to the IOC definition, if the AHAUS team was recognized by the organizing committee of the Olympics. Since hockey would be the most profitable event at the Olympics, Dudley felt that the Swiss organizing committee would agree to anything as long as the IOC approved. To protect the interests of the CAHA, Dudley successfully passed a motion at the IIHF meeting which prevented any Canadian team being accepted at the Olympics without the approval of the CAHA.

The Swiss organizing committee decided that any team sent must adhere to IOC definition of amateur, and live up to the Olympic Oath. The Canadian Olympic Association wanted to send a team of college hockey players to represent Canada, instead of a club team. The CAHA went to the RCAF for a solution, and invited its Ottawa RCAF Flyers team to represent Canada. The choice was criticized by Dave Dryburgh of the Regina Leader-Post who wrote that it would a third-rate team and said, "Any time Canada cannot send its best hockey team to the Olympics it shouldn't send one at all". Dudley sought reinforcements to strengthen the team before they sailed to Europe in January 1948, and stated the CAHA would pay to fly players to Switzerland if necessary. Eight players were eventually added to the team, and Dudley felt they would adequately represent Canada, even if they might not be as strong as previous Canadian national teams.

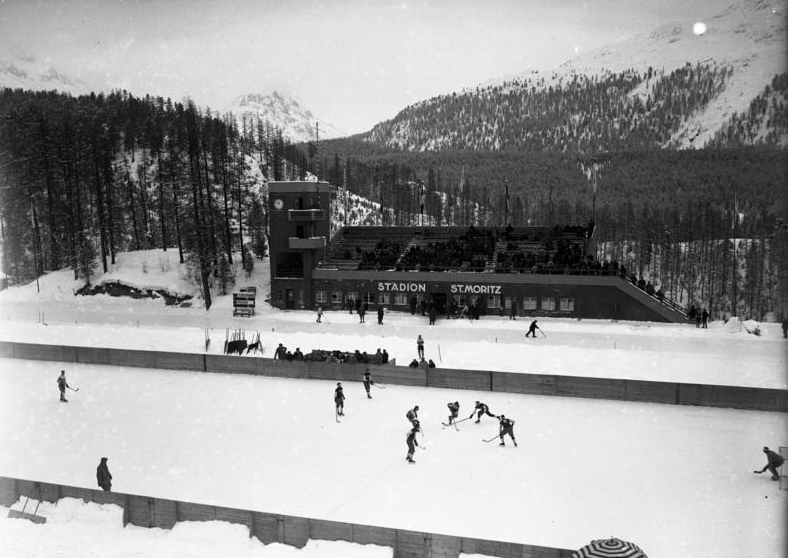
Outdoor stadium used for ice hockey at the 1948 Winter Olympics in St. Moritz

The status of ice hockey at the 1948 Winter Olympics was threatened when the United States Olympic Committee led by Avery Brundage threatened to boycott the Olympics if an AHAUS team was recognized instead of an AAU team. The IIHF executive met again and agreed that its teams would not play against a team chosen by the AAU. Dudley again stated that the IIHF should host its own World Championships separate from the Olympics if differences could not be resolved. He was assured by the IIHF that such a tournament could be arranged on 48 hours' notice.

The night before the Olympics began, it was decided to allow the AHAUS team to play in the tournament, but the IOC declared that games played by the United States team would not count in the standings. The day before the tournament ended, the IOC decided that the winner would be recognized as Olympic champion, except for the United States team. Dudley felt that the winner would have been recognized as a world champion, whether or not the IOC recognized it. The Ottawa RCAF Flyers completed the tournament with seven wins and a draw, to capture the gold medal for Canada.

After the Olympics, Dudley arranged for the Ottawa RCAF Flyers to complete an exhibition game schedule to raise funds to cover travel expenses. He stated that the 1948 Olympic hockey tournament was played in "ridiculous weather conditions" with poor refereeing. He advocated to only attended international events on artificial ice, which would showcase Canada's true abilities. He felt that the IOC should be composed of members appointed by national sports bodies who would be more knowledgeable of sport, instead of a person who was disconnected from the game appointing his or her own replacement.

=== 1949 to 1951 ===
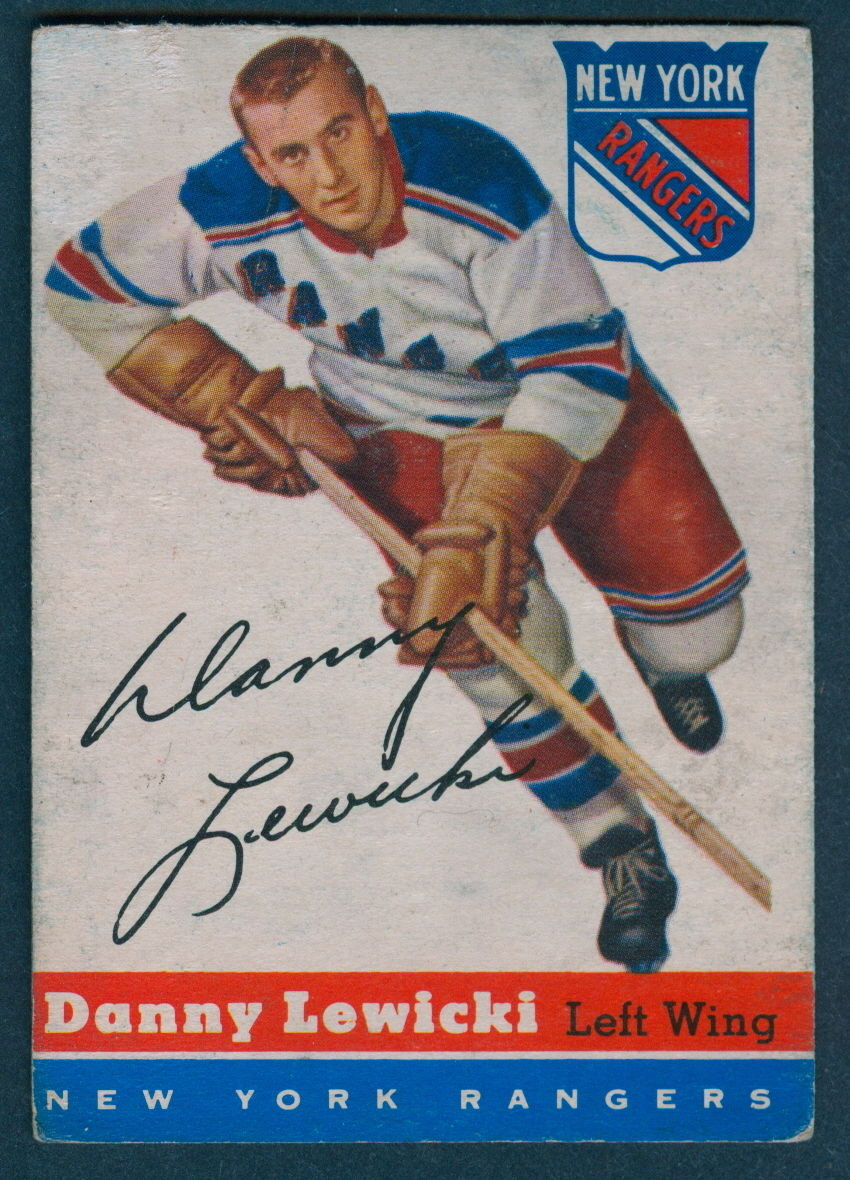
Danny Lewicki

In January 1949, the Canadian Olympic Association sought government grants towards the development of amateur sport. Dudley was opposed the use of tax dollars to fund sports, on the premise that the government would be in control of the sports associations, instead of those persons directly involved in the sport. He also felt that politicians would inevitably use sport for political advantage.

The Sudbury Wolves were chosen to represent Canada at the 1949 Ice Hockey World Championships, and placed second to the Czechoslovakia men's national ice hockey team.

In April 1949, Danny Lewicki was the focus of whether or not a minor can be signed to a contract known as a "C" form, and it be enforced when he became 18 years old. Dudley stated that if the player refused to report to an amateur club chosen by the professional club, he could then be offered a professional contract. Refusal of the professional contract would result in his suspension from the CAHA, as per agreements with the NHL.

In response to accusations by the Canadian Teachers' Federation in August 1949, that the CAHA was wrecking high school hockey and placing youths away from home away from parental control, Dudley stated that the claims were nonsense, that he had received no complaints from parents, and asked for the claims to be substantiated. A survey later that year by the Canadian Education Association, concluded that the effect of hockey on education was not a national problem. Dudley opted to participate in discussions to minimize any effects of hockey on education.

The Edmonton Mercurys were chosen to represent Canada at the 1950 Ice Hockey World Championships, and went undefeated to win the title. The Lethbridge Maple Leafs represented Canada at the 1951 Ice Hockey World Championships, and were also undefeated in defending Canada's world title.

Early in 1951, the OHA was faced with a mutiny in senior ice hockey in Kingston. Dudley recommended an inquiry into why a group of six players wanted to transfer from an existing new to a new team, along with the coach. After an inquiry, he and fellow OHA executives Jack Roxburgh, Frank Buckland and W. A. Hewitt, handed out a lifetime suspension to George Patterson who coached Kingston's senior B-level team, for conspiring to deliberately lose a playoff series to avoid moving into a higher-level of playoffs, rather than staying in a lower level and potentially make more profits at home playoff games than on the road.

In June 1951, Dudley confirmed that the Newfoundland Amateur Hockey Association wanted to join the CAHA as its own branch, instead of part of the Maritime Amateur Hockey Association. No agreement was reached, and Dudley sought continued discussion.

=== 1952 Winter Olympics ===
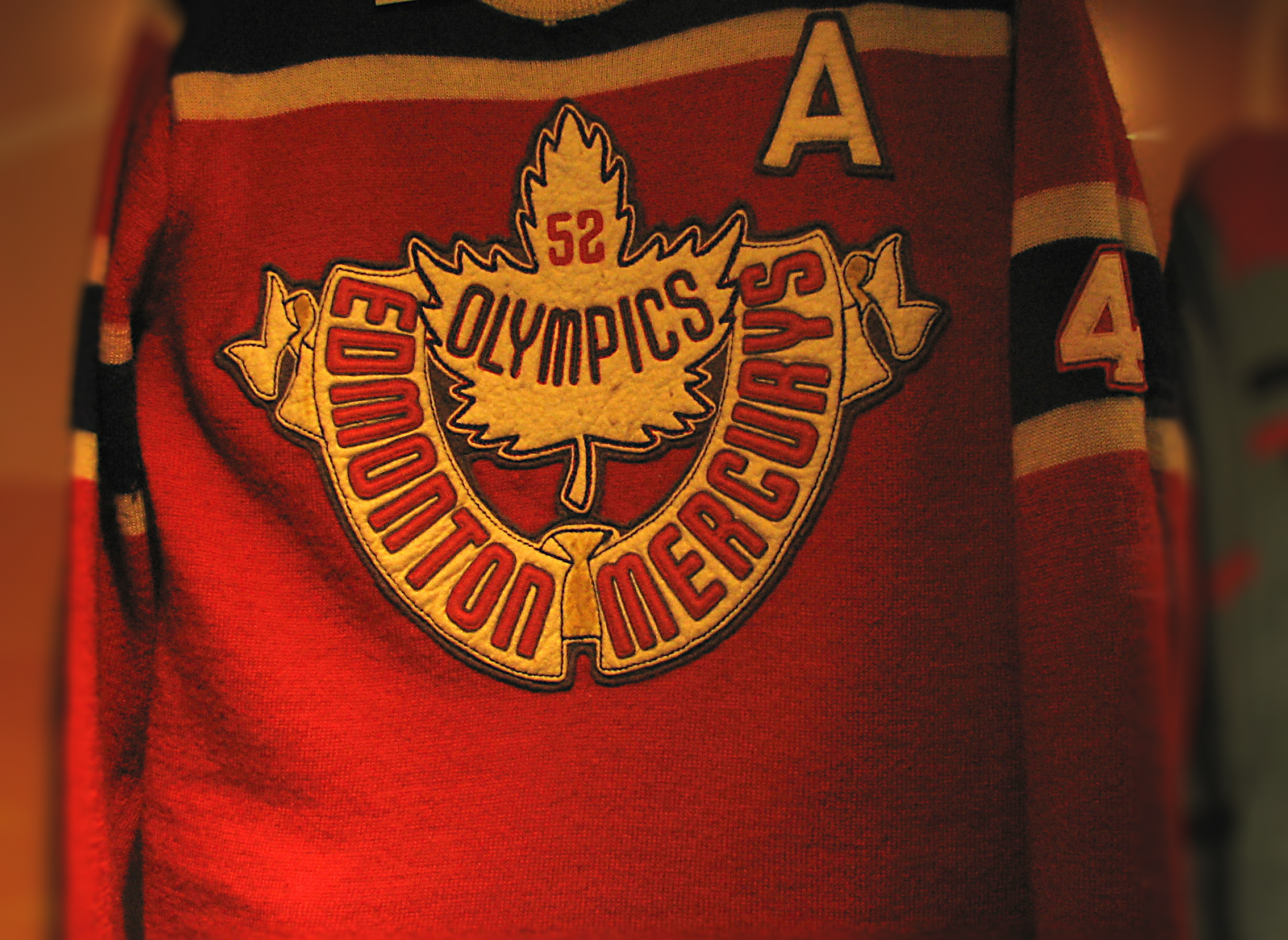
The Edmonton Mercurys (team jersey pictured) represented Canada in ice hockey at the 1952 Winter Olympics.

Discussions began in 1950, whether or not ice hockey would be included in the 1952 Winter Olympics hosted in Oslo. The IOC sought assurance that participating teams would adhere to its amateur code rather than what was accepted by the IIHF, and also wanted to exclude IIHF president Fritz Kraatz from negotiations. Dudley and W. G. Hardy agreed there would be no negotiations on those terms, nor would they repudiate Kraatz. Dudley referred to the IOC as dictatorial and undemocratic, and expected the IIHF to discuss having its own 1952 Ice Hockey World Championships instead. He further stated that the Olympics would be a financial failure without the inclusion of hockey.

Ice hockey at the 1952 Winter Olympics ultimately went ahead, and the Edmonton Mercurys represented Canada again by winning the gold medal.

=== 1952 to 1953 ===
Dudley supported a resolution at the 1952 CAHA general meeting which prevented the eastward transfer of players, to prevent rosters in Western Canada from being depleted by clubs in the more populated areas of Eastern Canada. He wanted to have protective measures in place, before renegotiating the professional-amateur agreement.

Canada did not participate in the 1953 Ice Hockey World Championships. On January 12, 1953, CAHA president W. B. George stated that, "Every year we spend $10,000 to send a Canadian hockey team to Europe to play 40 exhibition games. All these games are played to packed houses that only enrich European hockey coffers. In return we are subjected to constant, unnecessary abuse over our Canadian style of play".

In March 1953, the CAHA suspended the QAHA after a dispute stemming from a Quebec registration certificate being issued a player who was under suspension by the CAHA. An ultimatum was given to teams in leagues affiliated with the QAHA to follow the CAHA if they wished to participate in playoffs for national championships, or remain under QAHA jurisdiction. Dudley published newspaper advertisements on behalf of the CAHA to notify of the decision. After the deadline, Dudley announced the suspension of all leagues and teams affiliated with the QAHA, except for the QSHL which resigned its provincial affiliation to operate independently of the QAHA and the CAHA.

Dudley was confident that issues could be resolved at the 1953 CAHA general meeting. He wanted the QAHA to return without any punitive damages, but with assurance there would be no recurrence of the infraction. The QAHA was reinstated, and Dudley urged for the CAHA executive to follow the rules consistently when it came to player replacements in playoffs, instead of making arbitrary decisions.

=== 1954 World Championships ===
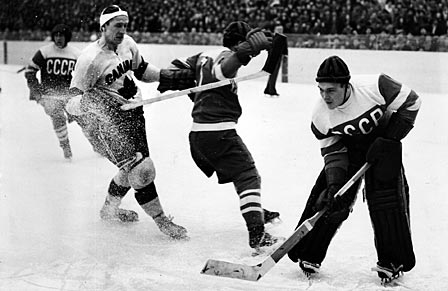
Canada versus the Soviet Union at the 1954 Ice Hockey World Championships

The CAHA planned on returning to the Ice Hockey World Championships in 1954, but Dudley had difficulties again in finding a team willing to represent Canada. He eventually arranged for the East York Lyndhursts from a senior B-level league in Ontario to attend the 1954 Ice Hockey World Championships, after several A-level senior teams declined due to the financial strain of travel, and players being away from work. The announcement was made in October 1953, and received little press coverage at the time. In February 1954, he sent reinforcements from higher-level senior teams to strengthen the roster, including Don Lockhart, Eric Unger, Tom Jamieson, and Bill Shill. Dudley said that choosing the national representative was an annual problem, and the cost of sending A-level teams was getting prohibitive. He arranged an exhibition schedule in Europe to acclimatize the team to the international rules of play, and raise funds from tickets to exhibition games to cover travel costs. The 1954 Ice Hockey World Championships was the first time the Soviet Union national team would participate, and he speculated they would finish no better than fourth place.

Canada lost in the final game by a 7–2 score to the Soviets. The loss was described as a "black eye" to Canada, a "catastrophe" and "a national calamity". The CAHA and Dudley were highly criticized by the media in Canada for sending a B-level senior team to international competition. Dudley invited suggestions on how to better form the team, and reiterated the prohibitive costs of sending A-level teams. He stated that the timing of the world championships coincided with playoffs in Canada, and that no A-level team would agree to leave at a critical team in their season. He also said that the profits from the Allan Cup and Memorial Cup playoffs would not sustain the annual cost of flying a team to Europe to shorten the time away from playing in Canada. He also considered inviting the Soviet Union national ice hockey team to tour Canada as a goodwill gesture, and since increased interest in seeing the Soviet team play would make it profitable.

=== 1955 World Championships ===
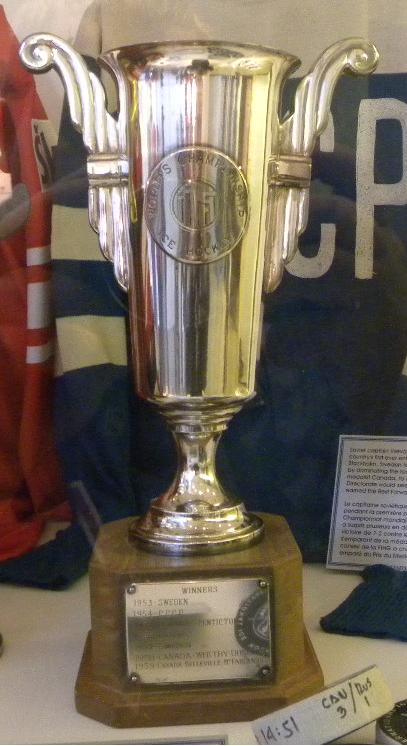
Trophy awarded for winning the Ice Hockey World Championships during the 1950s

In July 1954, Dudley was confident the criticism of choosing the national team would end, after he announced that the 1954 Allan Cup champion Penticton Vees were chosen to represent Canada at the 1955 Ice Hockey World Championships. He predicted that Penticton would win regain the championship for Canada, and that there would be more pressure on the Soviet team than Canada's team.

In November 1954, the CAHA received an invitation for a Canadian team to tour the Soviet Union. Dudley said the request came too late to change existing schedules to accommodate the request. The CAHA deferred the proposal of a Canadian tour of the Soviet Union until after the World Championships which was a higher priority, despite the willingness of the Winnipeg Maroons to accept the Soviet invitation. The Penticton Vees won all eight played the 1955 Ice Hockey World Championships to regain the title for Canada.

At the CAHA general meeting in May 1955, Dudley proposed regulations to include television broadcasts rights in addition to the radio broadcast fees the CAHA collects for amateur games. He proposed a 10 cent-per-ticket fee for all games in Canada towards the national team's fund. He reported interest by private company to sponsor the team, and that the CAHA's insurance company proposed to sponsor the printing of CAHA rule books. Dudley said he was not enthusiastic about sending teams to international events, but felt obligated to send a team to the upcoming Winter Olympics. In regards to whether the IOC would accept a Canadian senior team, he mentioned it was possible to have university and college players quickly registered with the CAHA if needed.

=== 1956 Winter Olympics ===
In August 1955, Dudley announced that the 1955 Allan Cup champions Kitchener-Waterloo Dutchmen were selected to represent Canada in ice hockey at the 1956 Winter Olympics. The customary exhibition tour would be omitted, and the team would fly to Europe. Plans to finance the trip included a national hockey week in Canada during the Olympics, in which 10 cents from each ticket sold would go to the CAHA. The Soviets invited Canada to play an exhibition series in Moscow after the Olympics, and Dudley replied that the Soviet Union would need to pay more of Canada's expenses to make it worthwhile. The Dutchmen won six games during the Olympic hockey tournament, but losses to the Soviet Union and the United States earned a bronze medal for Canada. Despite the result, Dudley felt that the Dutchmen were the best team Canada had sent to the Olympics since World War II. In response to calls for an all-star team being sent instead, he stated that 90 per cent of senior hockey teams in Canada operated at a deficit, and taking away their best players for an all-star team would be detrimental to their ticket sales. He again mentioned the possibility of hosting the Soviet national team on a tour of Canada.

=== 1956 to 1957 ===
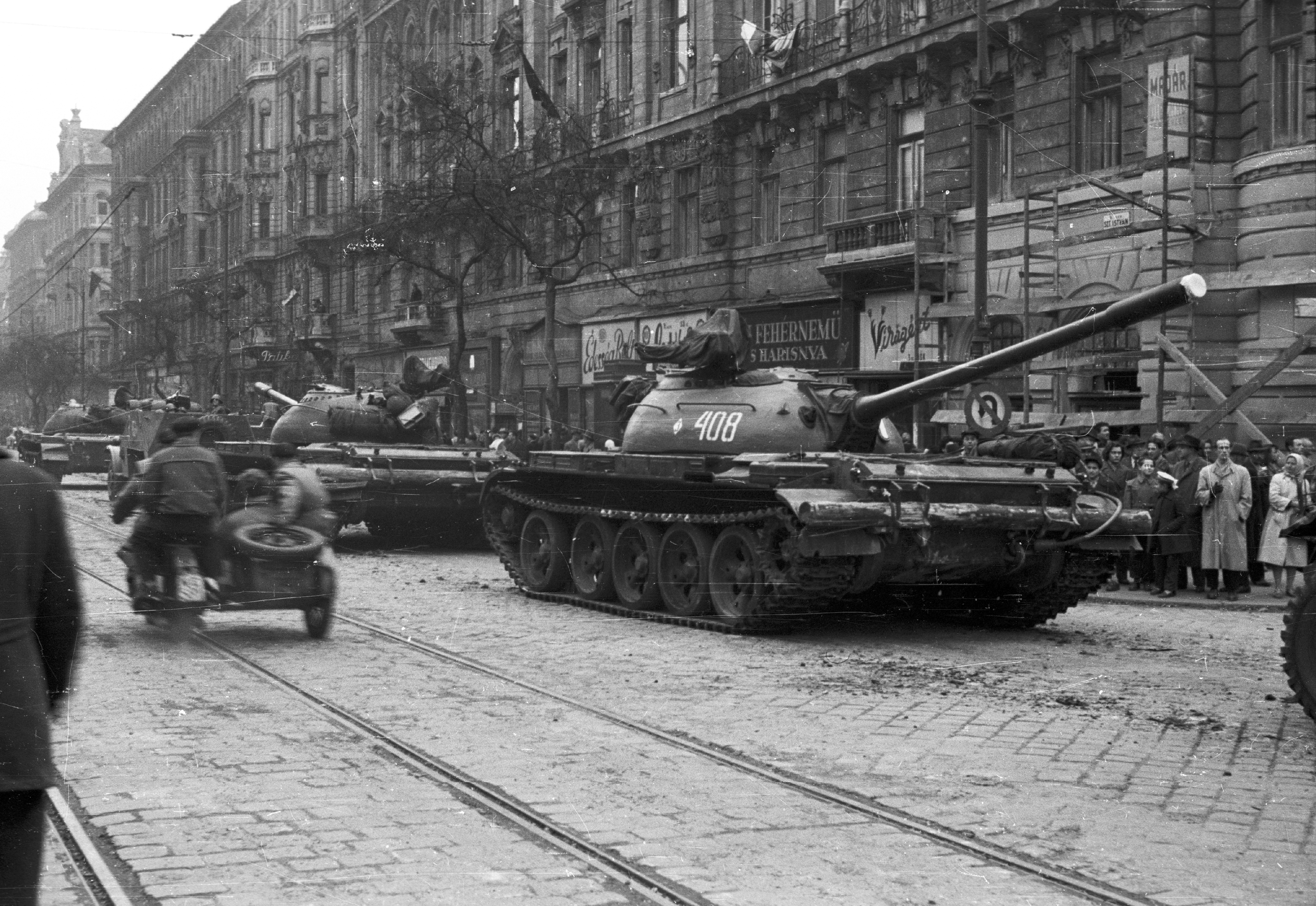
Soviet invasion of Hungary in October 1956

At the May 1956 general meeting of the CAHA, Dudley stated that development fees received from the NHL amounted to $27,000 in the past season. He encouraged the provincial branches to set aside their differences in the playing rules, as per agreements with the NHL to use similar rules as the professionals. The CAHA agreed to send a team to the next Winter Olympics, as long as it was not burdened with the whole cost. An agreement was reached in principle to send an all-star team to the 1957 World Championships, based on a core of players from the 1956 Allan Cup champion Vernon Canadians.

Dudley felt it was important that Canadians agreed the best possible team was being sent, and that the CAHA should negotiate the best financial arrangements to play abroad. He believed an all-star team from senior teams would give the best results at the Olympics and the World Championships, but funding was an issue. A sponsored team based in one city was more cost efficient than combining players from different cities. In an interview with the Toronto Telegram he said, "If we could get the Allan Cup team of the previous year as a nucleus that would be even better, but we'd have to pry the best players loose from other clubs".

The CAHA sought $75,000 for training and travel costs for a full-time national team, which Dudley hoped a private sector sponsorship would cover. In September 1956, Dudley stated that the offer by a private company was withdrawn. The CAHA appealed for donations of $100 from 750 sportspersons to cover the costs. Dudley stated in October 1956, that fundraising was delayed due to searching for a sponsor.

Dudley made the announcement in November 1956, that Canada would not send its national team to the 1957 Ice Hockey World Championships due to recent changes in international affairs. Canada and the United States boycotted the World Championships due to the 1956 Soviet invasion of Hungary.

Dudley attended the 1957 IIHF summer congress and made arrangements for a Soviet national team tour of Canada during November and December 1957. The CAHA agreed to pay Soviet travel within Canada and return fare, and a reciprocal Canadian tour of the Soviet Union in 1958. Dudley announced the tour would be seven games played under international rules, and only include cities in Ontario and Quebec due to limits on the Soviet's available travel time. He expected a sold-out crowd at Maple Leaf Gardens for the first game of the tour, and thought the Soviet team might be stronger than its Olympic version. The tour reached on 62,000 in attendance. Dudley he felt the Soviets displayed a different way in which hockey could be played scientifically with sportsmanship. He wanted to see games in Western Canada on future tours, and mentioned the possibility of inviting Swedish or Czechoslovak teams. He felt the event was good for international hockey, despite existing political differences. The CAHA profited more than $22,000 from the Soviet tour.

=== 1958 to 1959 ===
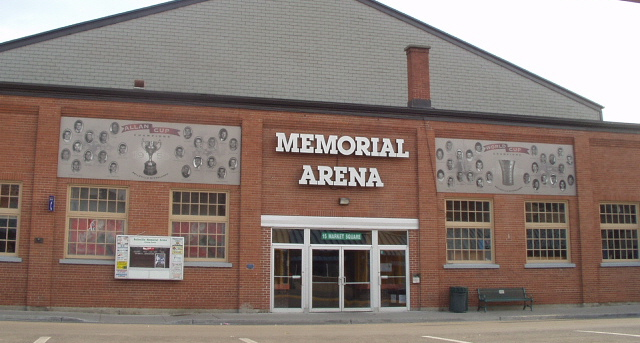
The Belleville Memorial Arena (pictured) was home to the McFarlands, and its facade displays the 1958 Allan Cup and 1959 World Championship teams.

The CAHA chose to participate in the 1958 Ice Hockey World Championships, and Dudley announced that the 1957 Allan Cup champions Whitby Dunlops would represent Canada and play a European exhibition schedule. Whitby won all seven games played at the World Championships to give Canada the title.

Dudley advocated for using the profits from the Soviet tour of Canada to send team on a reciprocal tour of the Soviet Union. In May 1958, the CAHA approved sending its first Canadian team on an exhibition tour of the Soviet Union. The 1958 Allan Cup finalists Kelowna Packers were chosen for the five-game tour, and Dudley arranged for three subsequent games in Sweden. He hoped that the Kelowna tour would promote future cultural exchanges with Eastern Europe.

Dudley reported in May 1958, that the CAHA and NHL were close to signing a new deal. The previous professional-amateur agreement had expired in 1955, and the groups had operated on a gentleman's agreement since. He announced a new agreement in January 1959, in which the NHL contribution increased to $40,000 from $27,000. The agreement set out rules for negotiation lists and reserve lists, and professional teams agreed to an earlier deadline to decide which players might be moved from a junior team to a professional team. The CAHA agreed that amateurs aged 17 and older would use same rules as the professionals except for overtime.

The 1958 Allan Cup champions Belleville McFarlands were chosen to represent Canada at the 1959 Ice Hockey World Championships. In the exhibition tour before the championships, Finnish newspaper Helsingin Sanomat published that Canada showed poor sportsmanship. Dudley's response was to advise the team to use discretion in future games and to avoid incidents. The McFarlands won seven of eight games played at the 1959 Ice Hockey World Championships to retain the world title for Canada.

Dudley scheduled the May 1959 CAHA general meeting to be hosted in Detroit, in conjunction with the AHAUS general meeting. He said that no CAHA branch offered to host delegates, which would typically cost $1,000. The Kitchener-Waterloo Dutchmen had been chosen to represent Canada at the upcoming Olympics, and Dudley announced that CAHA would pay for uniforms, and traveling expenses. At the meeting, the CAHA approved an increase in the roster size for the national team. It allowed the Dutchmen to take an additional 10 players from other teams, and would assist the teams which loaned players by granting roster replacements and $500 compensation.

=== 1960 Winter Olympics ===
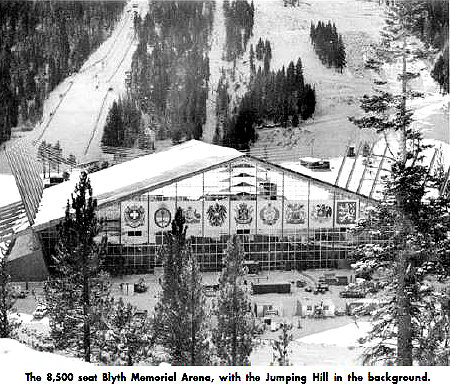
Blyth Arena at the Squaw Valley Ski Resort

Dudley arranged a tour of Canada in January and February 1960 for the Russian Selects, an all-star team of players from clubs in Moscow. He stated the CAHA would decide at the upcoming general meeting whether to send a team on a reciprocal tour of Russia next winter. The CAHA was invited to send a team by the coach of the Russian Selects. Dudley also arranged a Japan men's national team tour in Canada prior to the Olympics.

Dudley oversaw ice hockey at the 1960 Winter Olympics on behalf of the IIHF. He arranged a qualification round to determine whether the West Germany or East Germany national team would play in the Olympic tournament, hosted at the Blyth Arena at the Squaw Valley Ski Resort in California. The Australia men's national team made its Olympic debut at the tournament, in which the United States men's national team won its first gold medal in hockey. After the games, Dudley stated that the Kitchener-Waterloo Dutchmen who won the silver medal representing Canada "cannot be blamed for not winning the title". He also hoped for the national consciousness of Canada to awake before the 1964 games, to avoid similar disappointments of not winning the gold medal in hockey.

In April 1960, Dudley stated that Europeans were anxious to see Canadian teams play tours abroad, despite comments by Arnold Heeney the Canadian Ambassador to the United States, who said that Canada was unpopular in Olympic hockey. In May 1960, Dudley wished to see a new method for choosing the Canadian national team which had less of an impact on domestic leagues, but produced results. He stated of the Canadian roster that, "Ours are the best 17 after 500 have gone to supply the needs to the pro leagues in Canada and the United States, and at the Olympics another 500 are eliminated because they are reinstated professionals".

== Personal life and death ==
Dudley became a member of Caledonian Lodge 249, the local Masonic lodge in 1915. He married Lulu Gidley in 1921. The couple never had children. He served 49 years on the Simcoe East riding association, and was affiliated with the Progressive Conservative Party of Ontario. He was a member of St. Paul's United Church in Midland, a member of the Orange Order in Canada, and chairman of the local Victory Bond committee in 1945.

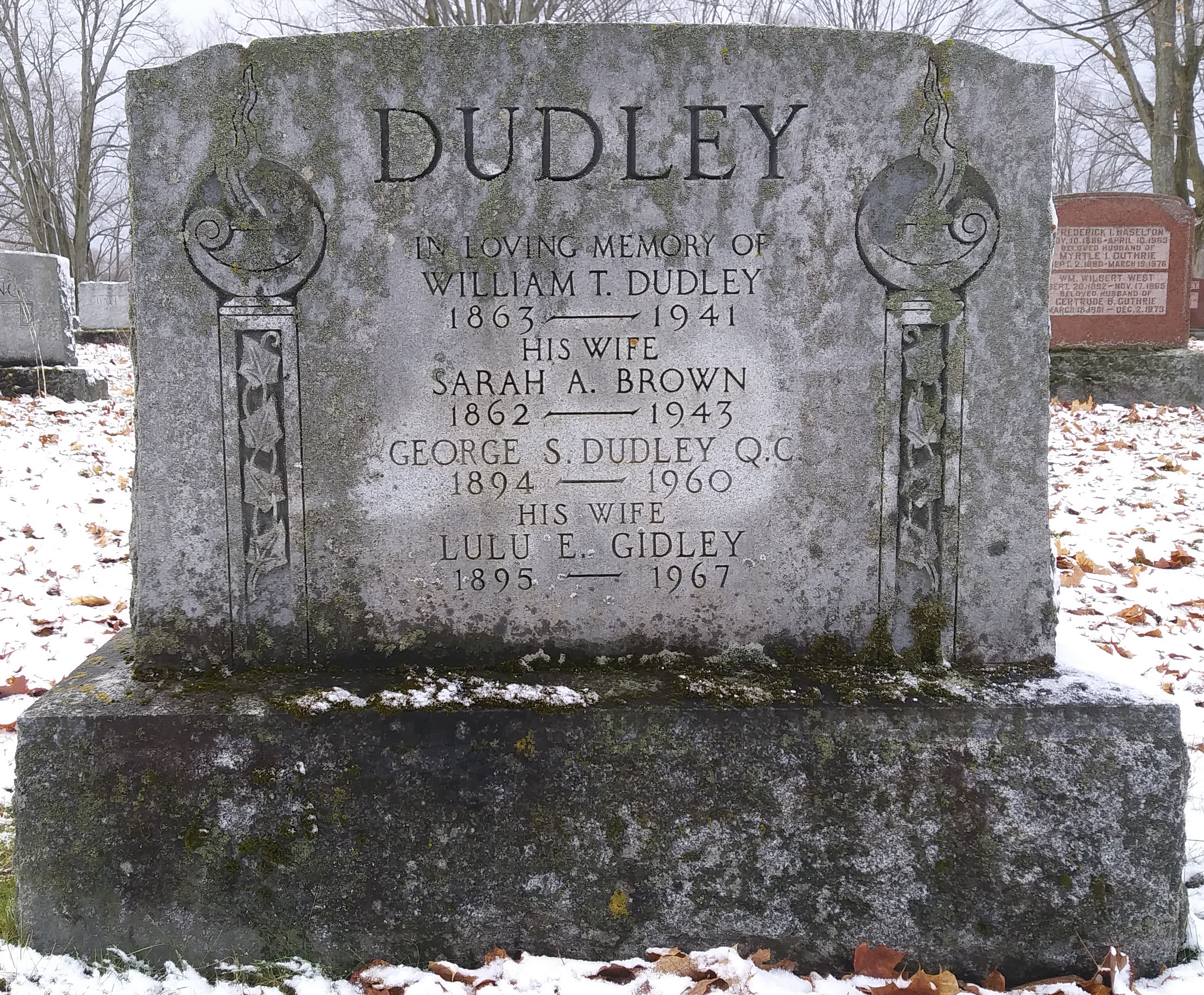
Dudley family gravestone at Lakeview Cemetery in Midland

Dudley had a stroke on May 6, 1960, and died on May 8, at St. Andrew's hospital in Midland. He was interred in the family plot with his parents at Lakeview Cemetery in Midland.

At the time of his death, Dudley was expected to become the next president of the IIHF. Robert Lebel who was a past-president of the CAHA, succeeded Dudley as vice-president of the IIHF and became president in July 1960. Gordon Juckes who was the CAHA president at the time, succeeded Dudley as secretary-manager of the CAHA when the position became a full-time paid role.

== Honours and awards ==
Dudley was made a life member of the CAHA in November 1944. He received the OHA Gold Stick award in 1949, in recognition of service to hockey in Ontario. He received the AHAUS citation award in 1950 for service to amateur hockey in the United States. Dudley and W. A. Hewitt were honoured with a dinner by the OHA in December 1950, and Dudley received a silver tea service in recognition of 26 years of service to the OHA. He was made a life member of the OHA in 1952. He was inducted to the builder category of the Hockey Hall of Fame in 1958.

After his death in 1960, the CAHA observed a moment of silence at that year's general meeting. He was posthumously inducted into the Midland Sports Hall of Fame on October 12, 1996.

== Legacy ==
Dudley Hewitt Cup

Dudley was known as Mr. Hockey. He and W. A. Hewitt are the namesakes of the Dudley Hewitt Cup. It was first awarded by the Canadian Junior Hockey League in 1971 to the Central Canada Junior A champion team, who moves on to the national Centennial Cup competition.

Dudley's death led to multiple tributes from the hockey community. CAHA president Gordon Juckes stated, "to sportsmen national and internationally, his death will mean the personal loss of an experienced, impartial and able administrator". CAHA vice-president Jack Roxburgh described him as, "the best man hockey ever knew". Toronto Maple Leafs coach Punch Imlach said that, "he did more for hockey than any living man". Journalist Jack Sullivan described Dudley as a staunch and shrewd hockey official, a problem solver, and a slow-talking person who stayed away from the limelight.

Canadian journalist and hockey historian Scott Young mentioned Dudley frequently in the book, 100 Years of Dropping the Puck: A History of the OHA. Young described Dudley as a low-key figure at first who grew to prominence by his reputation as being one the busiest and most able volunteers in the OHA. Young further stated that Dudley was a forward thinker, a man who always had a solution to problems in hockey, and had the ability to listen to a conversation and find a compromise without forcing anyone to change his mind. Young credited Dudley for dealing with reforms to amateurism, and regulations on player salaries and transfers, which led to increased interest in hockey. Young also credited Dudley's management skills as a primary factor in the improvement of OHA finances during the 1950s.

== Bibliography ==
- Ellison, Jenny; Anderson, Jennifer (2018). Hockey: Challenging Canada's Game. Ottawa, Ontario: Canadian Museum of History. p. 116. ISBN 978-0-7766-2771-7 – via Google Books.
- Oliver, Greg (2017). Father Bauer and the Great Experiment: The Genesis of Canadian Olympic Hockey. Toronto, Ontario: ECW Press. ISBN 978-1-77041-249-1.
- Ladouceur, Denise & John (2006), Lakeview Cemetery Tombstone Index, Midland 125 Cemetery Project, Midland, Ontario: North Simcoe Genealogy Society
- McKinley, Michael (2014). It's Our Game: Celebrating 100 Years Of Hockey Canada. Toronto, Ontario: Viking Press. ISBN 978-0-670-06817-3.
- Duplacey, James (1998). Total Hockey: The official encyclopedia of the National Hockey League. Kingston, New York: Total Sports Publishing. ISBN 0-8362-7114-9.
- Ferguson, Bob (2005). Who's Who in Canadian Sport, Volume 4. Markham, Ontario: Fitzhenry & Whiteside. ISBN 1-55041-855-6.
- Young, Scott (1989). 100 Years of Dropping the Puck. Toronto, Ontario: McClelland & Stewart. ISBN 0-7710-9093-5.
- Constitution, By-laws, Regulations, History. Gloucester, Ontario: Canadian Amateur Hockey Association. May 1990.
