= Kumor =

Kumor is a Polish surname. Notable people with this surname include:

- Emil Kumor (1899–1957), Polish Army officer

== See also ==
- Komor (surname)
- Komar (surname)
