= Aleksandr Komarov =

Aleksandr Komarov

- Aleksandr Komarov (wrestler) (Russian: Александр Андреевич Комаров; born 1999), Russian Greco-Roman wrestler
- Aleksandr Komarov (ice hockey) (Russian: Александр Георгиевич Комаров; 1923–2013), Soviet ice hockey player

== See also ==
- Oleksandr Komarov
- Komarov (surname)
