= Komar (surname) =

Komar is a Slavic-language surname, meaning 'mosquito'. A similar Slavic surname with the same meaning is Komár, and Komar may also appeared as Anglicised and Germanised form of this surname. Notable people with the surname include:

- Delfina Potocka, née Komar (1807–1877), Polish countess
- Dicky Komar (born 1964), Indonesian diplomat
- Dora Komar, stage name of Dorothea Komarek (1914–2006), Austrian dancer, actress and opera singer
- Hryhoriy Komar (born 1976), Ukrainian Greek Catholic bishop
- Iris Komar, German swimmer
- Ivan Komar (born 1970), Belarusian athlete
- Jack Komar, American judge
- Juan Komar (born 1986), Argentine footballer
- Mateusz Komar (born 1985), Polish cyclist
- Max Komar (born 1987), American football player
- Milan Komar (1921–2006), Slovenian-Argentine philosopher
- Polina Komar (born 1999), Russian synchronised swimmer
- Rene Komar (born 1977), Croatian footballer
- Wacław Komar (1909–1972), Polish brigadier general
- Władysław Komar (1940–1998), Polish athlete

== Fictional characters ==
- Maxim Komar-Myshkin (1978–2011), fictional artist, a project of Roee Rosen, Israeli artist, writer and filmmaker

== See also ==
- Sue Palmer-Komar (born 1967), Canadian racing cyclist
- Komar and Melamid, Russian-American artistic duo
- Komarov (surname)
- Komor (surname)
