= Tom Campbell (ice hockey) =

Canadian ice hockey player

- Born: March 10, 1922 Toronto, ON, CAN
- Died: March 26, 1996 (aged 74) Toronto, ON, CAN
- Height: 5 ft 10 in (178 cm)
- Weight: 170 lb (77 kg; 12 st 2 lb)
- Position: Defenseman
- Shot: Left
- Played for: East York Lyndhursts; Pittsburgh Hornets; Hollywood Wolves; Washington Lions
- National team: Canada
- Playing career: 1938–1954
Medal record
Men's ice hockey
Silver medal – second place	1951 Stockholm	Ice hockey

Thomas Joseph Campbell (March 10, 1922 – March 26, 1996) was a Canadian ice hockey player with the East York Lyndhursts. He captained the team that won a silver medal at the 1954 World Ice Hockey Championships in Stockholm, Sweden. He also played with the Pittsburgh Hornets, Washington Lions, and Hollywood Wolves.
