= Yury Komarov =

Yury Komarov may refer to:

- Yury Komarov (businessman) (born 1945), Russian businessman
- Yury Komarov (footballer) (born 1954), Russian footballer
