= George Sayliss =

Canadian ice hockey player (1931–2020)

- Born: March 3, 1931 Toronto, Ontario, Canada
- Died: September 25, 2020 (aged 89) Lakefield, Ontario, Canada
- Position: Defenseman/forward
- Shot: Left
- Played for: East York Lyndhursts
- National team: Canada
- Playing career: 1951–1954
Medal record
Men's ice hockey
Silver medal – second place	1951 Stockholm	Ice hockey

George Sayliss (March 3, 1931 – September 25, 2020) was a Canadian ice hockey player with the East York Lyndhursts. He won a silver medal at the 1954 World Ice Hockey Championships in Stockholm, Sweden. He also played with the Stratford Kroehlers.
