= Norman Gray =

Norman Gray may refer to:

- Norman Gray (Newfoundland politician) (1875–1952), Newfoundland merchant and politician
- Norman B. Gray (1902–1976), Justice of the Wyoming Supreme Court
- Norm Gray (1930–2008), Canadian ice hockey player
