= Vic Sluce =

Canadian ice hockey player

- Born: May 21, 1928 East York, Ontario, Canada
- Died: October 1, 1991 (aged 63) Hamilton, Ontario, Canada
- Position: Right wing
- Played for: East York Lyndhursts; Scarborough Dukes; Scarborough Rangers
- National team: Canada
- Playing career: 1946–1954
Medal record
Men's ice hockey
Silver medal – second place	1951 Stockholm	Ice hockey

Victor William James Sluce (May 21, 1928 – October 1, 1991) was a Canadian ice hockey player with the East York Lyndhursts. He won a silver medal at the 1954 World Ice Hockey Championships in Stockholm, Sweden. He also played for the Scarborough Dukes and Scarborough Rangers in the OHA.
