= John Petro (ice hockey) =

Canadian ice hockey player

Johnny Petro
- Born: July 9, 1930 Toronto, Ontario, Canada
- Died: October 23, 1998 (aged 68) Toronto, ON, CAN
- Position: Left wing
- Played for: East York Lyndhursts; Washington Lions
- National team: Canada
- Playing career: 1941–1954
Medal record
Men's ice hockey
Silver medal – second place	1954 Stockholm	Ice hockey

John Paul Petro (July 9, 1930 – October 23, 1998) was a Canadian ice hockey player with the East York Lyndhursts. He won a silver medal at the 1954 World Ice Hockey Championships in Stockholm, Sweden. He also played for the Washington Lions in the Eastern Amateur Hockey League. In the 1951 Worlds, Petro scored 10 points (8 goals, 2 assists) in 7 games.
