= Komár =

Komár (feminine: Komárová) is a Czech and Slovak surname, meaning 'mosquito'. The surname also appears in Hungary. A similar surname in other Slavic languages with the same meaning is Komar. Notable people with the surname include:

- Júlia Komár (1912–1976), Hungarian actress
- László Komár (1944–2012), Hungarian singer

== See also ==
- Komarov (surname)
