= John Scott (ice hockey, born 1928) =

Canadian ice hockey player (born 1928)

- Born: 1928 (age 97–98) Canada
- Height: 5 ft 9 in (175 cm)
- Position: Right wing
- Played for: East York Lyndhursts; Ayr Raiders
- National team: Canada
- Playing career: 1949–1954
Medal record
Men's ice hockey
Silver medal – second place	1951 Stockholm	Ice hockey

John Scott (born 1928) is a Canadian retired ice hockey player. He played with the East York Lyndhursts, and won a silver medal at the 1954 World Ice Hockey Championships in Stockholm, Sweden. He also played for the Ayr Raiders in Ayr, Scotland.
