= Kombarov =

Kombarov (Russian: Комба́ров) is a Russian surname. Notable people with the surname include:

- Dmitri Kombarov (born 1987), Russian footballer
- Kirill Kombarov (born 1987), Russian footballer, brother of Dmitri

== See also ==
- Komarov (surname)
