= Harold Fiskari =

Canadian ice hockey player

Hal Fiskari
- Born: September 14, 1928 Toronto, Ontario, Canada
- Died: November 21, 2012 (aged 84) Parry Sound, Ontario, Canada
- Position: Defenseman
- Played for: East York Lyndhursts
- National team: Canada
- Playing career: 1948–1954
Medal record
Men's ice hockey
Silver medal – second place	1951 Stockholm	Ice hockey

Harold Fiskari (September 14, 1928 – November 21, 2012) was a Canadian ice hockey player with the East York Lyndhursts. He won a silver medal at the 1954 World Ice Hockey Championships in Stockholm, Sweden.
