= Bob Kennedy (ice hockey) =

Canadian ice hockey player

- Born: June 15, 1930 Toronto, Ontario, Canada
- Died: December 18, 1998 (aged 68) St. Petersburg, Florida, USA
- Position: Center
- Played for: East York Lyndhursts
- National team: Canada
- Playing career: 1949–1954
Medal record
Men's ice hockey
Silver medal – second place	1951 Stockholm	Ice hockey

Robert Gordon Kennedy (June 15, 1930 – December 18, 1998), was a Canadian ice hockey player with the East York Lyndhursts. He won a silver medal at the 1954 World Ice Hockey Championships in Stockholm, Sweden. He also played with the Stratford Kroehlers.
