= Gavin Lindsay =

Canadian ice hockey player

- Born: July 5, 1929 (age 97) Toronto, Ontario, Canada
- Position: Goaltender
- Played for: East York Lyndhursts
- National team: Canada
- Playing career: 1953–1954
Medal record
Men's ice hockey
Silver medal – second place	1951 Stockholm	Ice hockey

Gavin Lindsay (born July 5, 1929) was a Canadian ice hockey player with the East York Lyndhursts. He won a silver medal at the 1954 World Ice Hockey Championships in Stockholm, Sweden.
