= Doug Chapman (ice hockey) =

Canadian ice hockey player (1930–1985)

- Born: March 27, 1930 Toronto, Ontario, Canada
- Died: January 27, 1985 (aged 54) Etobicoke, Ontario, Canada
- Height: 6 ft 0 in (183 cm)
- Weight: 185 lb (84 kg; 13 st 3 lb)
- Position: Defenseman
- Shot: Left
- Played for: East York Lyndhursts; Oshawa Generals
- National team: Canada
- Playing career: 1947–1954
Medal record
Men's ice hockey
Silver medal – second place	1951 Stockholm	Ice hockey

Douglas Chapman (March 27, 1930 – January 27, 1985) was a Canadian ice hockey player with the East York Lyndhursts. He won a silver medal at the 1954 World Ice Hockey Championships in Stockholm, Sweden. He also played with the Oshawa Generals. Chapman died in Etobicoke, Ontario on January 27, 1985, at the age of 54.
