= Russ Robertson =

Canadian ice hockey player (born 1928)

- Born: August 5, 1928 (age 98) Canada
- Position: Defenseman
- Played for: East York Lyndhursts
- National team: Canada
- Playing career: 1953–1954
Medal record
Men's ice hockey
Silver medal – second place	1951 Stockholm	Ice hockey

Russell Robertson (born August 5, 1928) is a Canadian retired ice hockey player. He played with the East York Lyndhursts, and won a silver medal at the 1954 World Ice Hockey Championships in Stockholm, Sweden.
