= Earl Clements =

Canadian ice hockey player

- Born: June 29, 1931 Toronto, Ontario, Canada
- Died: August 29, 2010 (aged 79) Toronto, Ontario, Canada
- Position: Left wing
- Played for: East York Lyndhursts; Stratford Kroehlers
- National team: Canada
- Playing career: 1949–1954
Medal record
Men's ice hockey
Silver medal – second place	1951 Stockholm	Ice hockey

Earle Henry Clements (June 29, 1931 – August 29, 2010) was a Canadian ice hockey player. He was a member of the East York Lyndhursts which won a silver medal at the 1954 World Ice Hockey Championships in Stockholm, Sweden representing Canada. He also played with the Stratford Kroehlers juniors.
