= Eric Unger =

Canadian ice hockey player

- Born: December 28, 1926 Strongfield, Saskatchewan, Canada
- Died: March 28, 2018 (aged 91) Welland, Ontario, Canada
- Height: 6 ft 0 in (183 cm)
- Weight: 180 lb (82 kg; 12 st 12 lb)
- Position: Center
- Shot: Left
- Played for: East York Lyndhursts; Philadelphia Rockets; Springfield Indians; Fort Worth Rangers; Vancouver Canucks; Oakland Oaks
- National team: Canada
- Playing career: 1947–1954
Medal record
Men's ice hockey
Silver medal – second place	1954 Stockholm	Ice hockey

Eric Ernest Unger (December 28, 1926 – March 28, 2018) was a Canadian ice hockey player with the East York Lyndhursts. He won a silver medal at the 1954 World Ice Hockey Championships in Stockholm, Sweden. He also played professionally with the Philadelphia Rockets, Springfield Indians, Fort Worth Rangers, Vancouver Canucks of the PCHL, and Oakland Oaks. He died in 2018.
