= Bill Shill =

Canadian ice hockey player

- Born: March 6, 1923 Toronto, Ontario, Canada
- Died: August 15, 1998 (aged 75)
- Height: 6 ft 1 in (185 cm)
- Weight: 190 lb (86 kg; 13 st 8 lb)
- Position: Right wing
- Played for: Boston Bruins
- National team: Canada
- Playing career: 1942–1953

Medal record

Representing Canada

Men's ice hockey

World Championships
Silver medal – second place	1954 Sweden	

William Roy Shill (March 6, 1923 – August 15, 1998) was a Canadian professional ice hockey player who played 79 games in the National Hockey League with the Boston Bruins between 1942 and 1947. After his professional career, Shill played for the East York Lyndhursts during the 1954 Ice Hockey World Championships.

== Playing career ==
Shill first joined the Bruins during the 1942–43 season, when he played 7 games. He played a further 45 games in 1945–46 and 27 in 1946–47. Shill scored 21 regular season goals and accrued 13 assists. Shill tallied one goal and assisted on two others in seven games during the 1946 Stanley Cup playoffs.

== Career statistics ==
=== Regular season and playoffs ===
			Regular season					Playoffs
Season	Team	League	GP	G	A	Pts	PIM	GP	G	A	Pts	PIM
1939–40	Toronto Red Indians	TIHL	19	12	7	19	16	4	0	2	2	4
1940–41	Toronto Young Rangers	OHA	12	7	5	12	10	5	3	0	3	4
1940–41	Toronto Young Indians	TIHL	19	14	7	21	16	4	0	2	2	4
1941–42	Toronto Young Rangers	OHA	16	23	11	34	36	6	8	2	10	8
1941–42	Toronto RCAF	TNDHL	7	9	5	14	8	—	—	—	—	—
1941–42	Toronto Red Indians	TIHL	18	15	10	25	14	—	—	—	—	—
1942–43	Boston Bruins	NHL	7	4	1	5	4	—	—	—	—	—
1942–43	Toronto Tip Tops	TIHL	2	5	0	5	4	3	3	4	7	6
1942–43	Toronto Navy	OHA Sr	6	6	6	12	11	7	3	3	6	2
1944–45	Cornwallis Navy	NSNDL	13	7	6	13	2	3	4	1	5	0
1945–46	Boston Bruins	NHL	45	15	12	27	12	7	1	2	3	2
1946–47	Boston Bruins	NHL	27	2	0	2	2	—	—	—	—	—
1946–47	Hershey Bears	AHL	13	1	3	4	2	—	—	—	—	—
1947–48	Dallas Texans	USHL	66	16	21	37	30	—	—	—	—	—
1948–49	Vancouver Canucks	PCHL	63	43	26	69	38	3	0	2	2	0
1948–49	Seattle Ironmen	PCHL	12	9	2	11	4	—	—	—	—	—
1949–50	Vancouver Canucks	PCHL	69	34	42	76	20	12	7	6	13	2
1950–51	Vancouver Canucks	PCHL	70	36	21	57	33	—	—	—	—	—
1951–52	Vancouver Canucks	PCHL	17	5	3	8	9	—	—	—	—	—
1951–52	Ottawa Senators	QSHL	3	0	1	1	0	—	—	—	—	—
1951–52	Brantford Redmen	OHA Sr	31	25	25	50	16	7	2	5	7	6
1952–53	Brantford Redmen	OHA Sr	46	36	27	63	44	5	2	3	5	4
1953–54	East York Lyndhursts	TIHL	—	—	—	—	—	—	—	—	—	—
PCHL totals			231	127	94	221	104	15	7	8	15	2
NHL totals			79	21	13	34	18	7	1	2	3	2

=== International ===
Year	Team	Event	GP	G	A	Pts	PIM
1954	Canada	WC	7	6	3	9	2
Senior totals			7	6	3	9	2

== Bibliography ==
- Diamond, Dan, ed. (2002), Total Hockey: The Official Encyclopedia of the National Hockey League, Second Edition, New York: Total Sports Publishing, ISBN 1-892129-85-X
