= Moe Galand =

Canadian ice hockey player

- Born: August 23, 1930 Scarborough, Ontario, Canada
- Died: July 24, 2007 (aged 76) Toronto, ON, CAN
- Position: Right wing
- Played for: East York Lyndhursts; Stratford Kroehlers; Oshawa Generals; Owen Sound Mercurys
- National team: Canada
- Playing career: 1947–1972
Medal record
Men's ice hockey
Silver medal – second place	1954 Stockholm	Ice hockey

Maurice Galand (August 23, 1930 – July 24, 2007) was a Canadian ice hockey player with the East York Lyndhursts. He won a silver medal at the 1954 World Ice Hockey Championships in Stockholm, Sweden. He was the top scorer of the tournament. He previously played in the OHA for the Stratford Kroehlers, Oshawa Generals and Owen Sound Mercury's.
