= Tom Jamieson =

Canadian ice hockey player

- Born: February 16, 1924 Havelock, ON, CAN
- Died: April 19, 1993 (aged 69) Owen Sound, ON, CAN
- Height: 6 ft 0 in (183 cm)
- Weight: 175 lb (79 kg; 12 st 7 lb)
- Position: Defenseman
- Shot: Left
- Played for: East York Lyndhursts; Quebec Aces; Harringay Racers; Earls Court Rangers; Brighton Tigers
- National team: Canada
- Playing career: 1944–1958
Medal record
Men's ice hockey
Silver medal – second place	1951 Stockholm	Ice hockey

Thomas Elmore Jamieson (February 16, 1924 – April 19, 1993) was a Canadian ice hockey player with the East York Lyndhursts. He won a silver medal at the 1954 World Ice Hockey Championships in Stockholm, Sweden. He also played with the Quebec Aces and Baltimore Clippers, as well as the Harringay Racers, Earls Court Rangers and Brighton Tigers in England.
