= Norm Gray =

Canadian ice hockey player

- Born: 1930 Toronto, ON, CAN
- Died: October 22, 2008 (aged 77–78) Oshawa, ON, CAN
- Position: Center
- Played for: East York Lyndhursts
- National team: Canada
- Playing career: 1948–1954
Medal record
Men's ice hockey
Silver medal – second place	1954 Stockholm	Ice hockey

Norman Scott Gray (1930 – October 22, 2008) was a Canadian ice hockey player with the East York Lyndhursts. He won a silver medal at the 1954 World Ice Hockey Championships in Stockholm, Sweden.
