= East York Lyndhursts =

Canadian ice hockey team

- City: East York, Ontario
- League: East York League
- Operated: 1952 to 1954
- Home arena: East York Memorial Arena
- Head coach: Greg Currie
- Captain: Tom Campbell

The East York Lyndhursts were an amateur senior ice hockey team based in East York, Ontario, Canada. The team was sponsored by Lyndhurst Motors, played in the Toronto Ice Hockey League as part of the Ontario Hockey Association, and represented the Canada men's national ice hockey team at the 1954 Ice Hockey World Championships. The Lyndhursts were the first Canadian team to play against the Soviet Union national ice hockey team, losing by a 7–2 score to place second overall at the World Championships.

Canada had previously dominated international competitions, and the loss was called "a national calamity, a national humiliation, and a mortifying experience", by journalist Elmer Ferguson. It was referred to as a "day of reckoning" in Canada by writer Michael McKinley, and a symbol of what went wrong with the Canadian Amateur Hockey Association's international strategy. It was the beginning of a rivalry between Canada and the Soviet Union, increased interest by the Canadian public in the Ice Hockey World Championships, and ultimately changed the Canadian approach to selecting a national team.

== Team history and statistics ==
The East York Lyndhursts played home games at the East York Memorial Arena, which opened in October 1951. The team was sponsored by Harry Crowder who owned Lyndhurst Motors located on Danforth Avenue, and sold cars manufactured by Nash Motors. He agreed to sponsor the team in 1952, with the expectation of a winning team. He stated, "my business's name is going to be on the sweaters, so I don't want a bunch of rangatangs [sic] giving me a bad name". The Lyndhursts played in the B-level of senior ice hockey in the Ontario Hockey Association. Other teams in their league included the Stouffville Clippers, Lambton Lumbermen, Ravina Ki-Y Flyers, and the Leaside Dines. The team finished in first place during the 1952–53 season, and reached the B-level finals during the 1953–54 season.

Ontario Hockey Association senior B-level regular season and playoffs results:

Season	Games	Won	Lost	Tied	Points	Goals for	Goals against	Standing	Playoffs
1952–53	30	29	9	2	60	187	97	1st, Toronto Ice Hockey League	Lost Ontario semifinal
1953–54	24	18	6	0	36	168	107	3rd, Toronto Ice Hockey League	Lost league final

== Selection as Team Canada ==
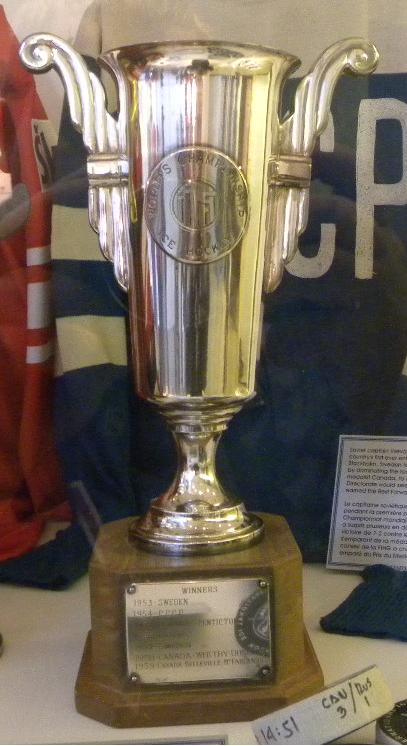
Ice Hockey World Championships trophy

George Dudley was secretary-manager of the Canadian Amateur Hockey Association (CAHA), and it was his responsibility to find a team to represent the Canada men's national ice hockey team at the Ice Hockey World Championships. In September 1953, he was struggling to find the next team willing to travel to Europe and play in the World Championships on behalf of Canada. He did not reveal a complete list of teams invited, but offered to pay room and board, travel fares, and C$20 per week spending money per player.

Canada had not participated in the 1953 Ice Hockey World Championships due to costs and abuse over the Canadian style of play. Senior teams eligible to compete for the 1954 title expressed similar concerns about the increasing costs of travel, and little financial gain from the gate receipts to exhibition games played to sold-out crowds in Europe. Teams also reiterated that their physical style of play led to more penalties from international on-ice officials than in Canada.

The 1953 Allan Cup champions Kitchener-Waterloo Dutchmen declined, despite being crowned the national champion. No other team at the senior A-level accepted the offer either. The senior B-level champions from Kingston declined, as did the finalists from Woodstock. The Lyndhursts who lost in the senior B-level semifinals, were the first team to accept the invitation. They were convinced to accept the offer, with the promise that senior A-level players would be added to the roster after league playoffs to strengthen the team.

The announcement of the East York Lyndhursts as the Canadian representative was made in October 1953, and received little press coverage at the time due to the 41st Grey Cup playoffs and the beginning of the 1953–54 NHL season. The Lyndhursts did not see an expected increase in attendance at its home games after the announcement, and played to a crowd of 20 spectators one game, and another game with 100 spectators including Dudley and other CAHA executives. The Lyndhursts played apprehensively during January 1954, and players were afraid to get injured before the trip to Europe. Criticism of how Team Canada was chosen began to surface in January 1954. In response, Dudley said it was an annual problem and "it's impossible to take a team or supply funds for senior or junior A-level squads".

== 1954 team members ==
East York Lyndhursts...

"Most us either borrowed money from our friends, employers. We were just a bunch of guys from East Toronto, for the most part, trying to get started in life".

—Earl Clements, 2004

Members of the 1954 East York Lyndhursts team included, coach Greg Currie, secretary Don Preston secretary, trainer Larry Kearns; and players Tom Campbell (captain), Earl Clements, Don Couch, Harold Fiskari, Moe Galand, Norm Gray, Bob Kennedy, Gavin Lindsay, John Petro, Russ Robertson, George Sayliss, John Scott, Vic Sluce, Reg Spragge and Dan Windley.

Since then National Hockey League had only six teams, there were many good players at the senior hockey level who did not play professionally. The team had only two players who were previous professional athletes. Tommy Campbell had played one season of minor league hockey with the Pittsburgh Hornets, and Moe Galand had played minor league baseball in the Brooklyn Dodgers organization. Other players on the team chose to work full-time jobs while playing senior ice hockey. Russ Robertson was the only team member who worked for Lyndhurst Motors.

Players on the Lyndhursts took the opportunity for a free trip to Europe, and arranged to take time off work. Some were not able to go, while others took unpaid leave of absence from their jobs.

== European exhibition tour ==
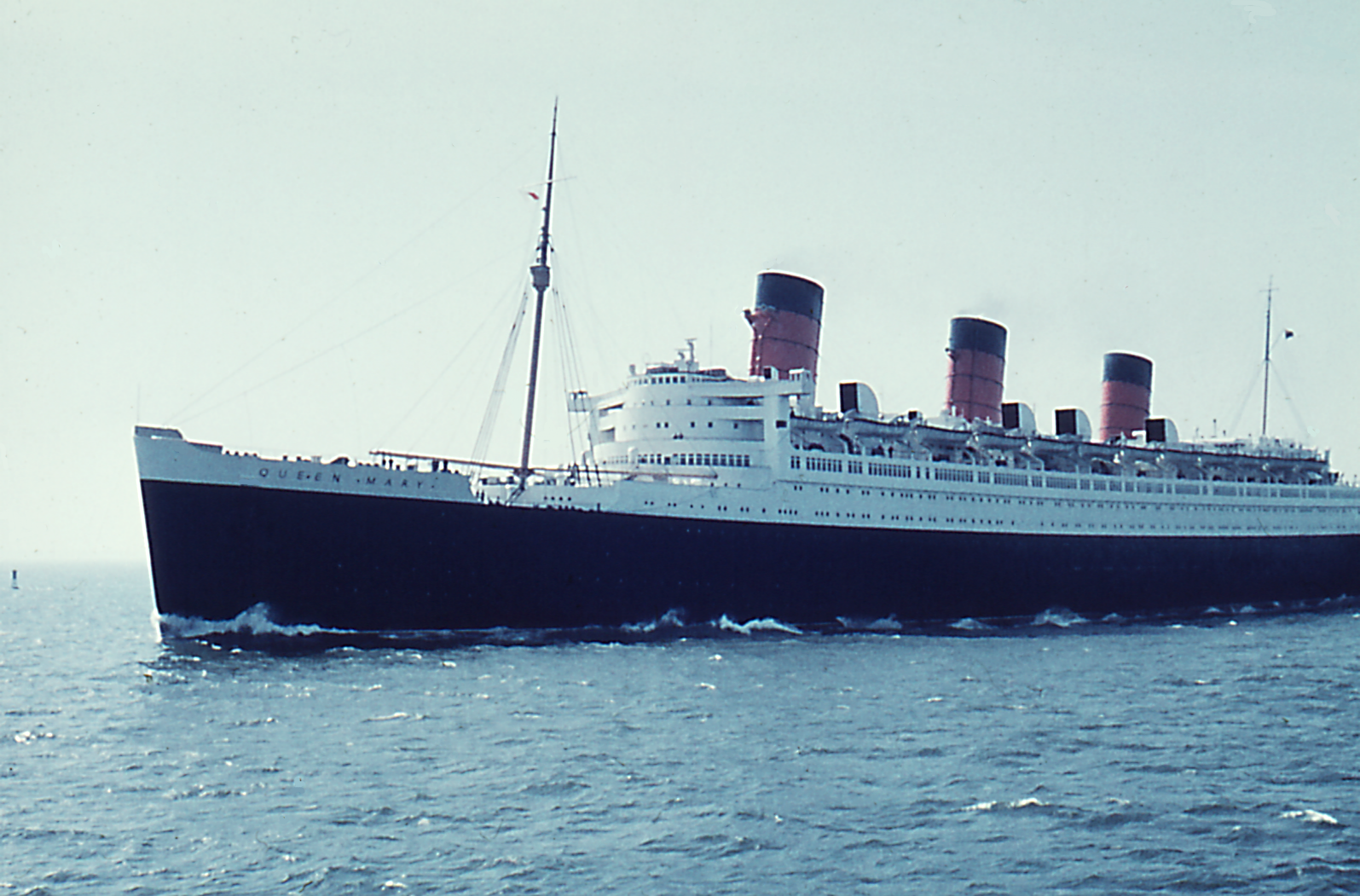
RMS Queen Mary c. 1959

Dudley arranged for the Lyndhursts to play an exhibition schedule in Europe prior to the World Championships, as it was necessary to acclimatize to the international rules of play, and earn profits from tickets to the games which would recuperate travel costs. Plans included a tour of thirteen games in France, Italy, Switzerland and Germany, on route to Sweden. Team coach Greg Currie stated they felt confident going into the tour, despite skepticism about their talents by media in Canada.

The Lyndhursts departed by train for New York City on January 22, 1954. They packed light, bringing along thermal earmuffs to play outdoors, and Vaseline to prevent windburn on their faces. Rex MacLeod of The Globe and Mail remarked, "The Lyndhursts might not be the best team Canada has ever sent abroad, but without doubt they would be the slipperiest". They sailed across the Atlantic Ocean to Europe aboard the RMS Queen Mary, and reached Cherbourg, France on January 28.

The Lyndhursts played their first game of the tour on January 30 in Paris, and lost by an 11–2 score to a team of Canadian all-stars from the British National League. The game was attended by 15,000 spectators, the biggest crowd the Lyndhursts' players had ever seen. Journalist Scott Young wrote that the Lyndhursts appeared to be travel-weary and suffering culture shock. In the same game, an unnamed Lyndhursts player reported he had been served a beer while in the penalty box.

The Lyndhurts defeated the Germany men's national ice hockey team by a 4–1 score on February 14, 1954, which was attended by 12,000 spectators including Canadians stationed at Royal Canadian Air Force bases near Mannheim. It was the team's eighth consecutive victory after losing the first game in Paris. Dudley announced that four more players would be flown in from Toronto to strengthen the roster, including Don Lockhart, Eric Unger, Tom Jamieson, and Bill Shill. Shortly before the World Championships began, Doug Chapman was added to the roster.

== 1954 World Championships ==
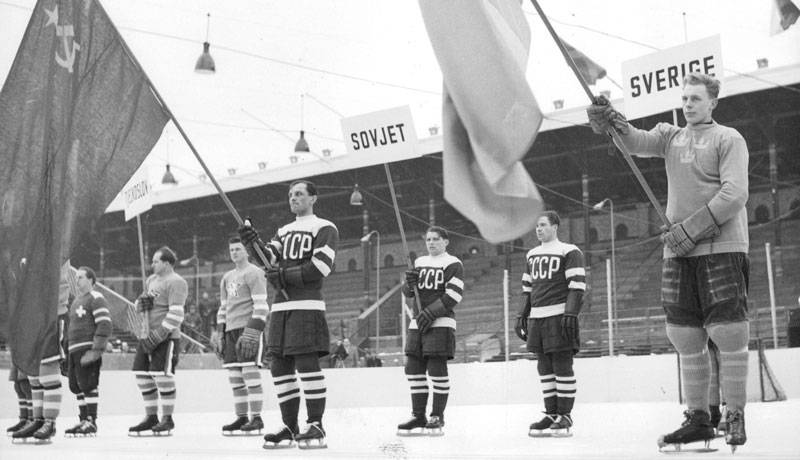
1954 Ice Hockey World Championships opening ceremony

The 1954 Ice Hockey World Championships were played from February 26 to March 7, in Stockholm. The event marked the first time that the Soviet Union national ice hockey team was participating at the World Championships. The Lyndhursts became the first Canadian hockey team to play against the Soviet Union national team. The Soviets had begun playing hockey in 1946, and Canada had dominated international competitions until that time.

The Lyndhursts won their first six of the World Championships, scoring 57 and conceding only five goals. They defeated Switzerland 8–1, Norway 8–0, Sweden 8–0, West Germany 8–1, Finland 20–1, and Czechoslovakia 5–2 in the rain. Moe Galand's wife gave birth to a son while he was in Sweden, and his teammates collected money to pay for the phone call home. During the game versus Sweden, the Lyndhursts lost two defencemen to injuries. Doug Chapman broke his jaw and Harold Fiskari injured his knee. Neither were able to continue playing in the World Championships.

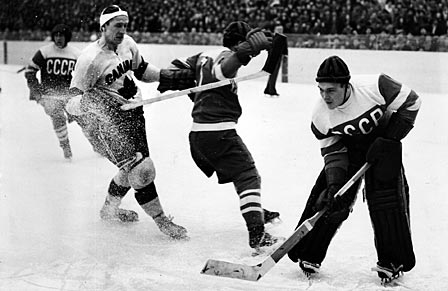
Championship game versus the Soviet Union

The Lyndhursts needed only a tie versus the Soviet Union in the final game of the round-robin on March 7, to claim the World Championship title for Canada. The game was played outdoors at the Stockholm Olympic Stadium in front of 16,000 spectators, with only one Canadian news reporter in attendance. It was raining when the game started which made a slushy ice surface, which then froze later in the game making it difficult to skate. Moe Galand described the conditions by saying, "You couldn't go behind the net for two periods. It was a very slushy. That would help the Soviets because they were mostly soccer players and knew how to use their feet". The Soviet Union team played with speed and finesse, compared to the Lyndhursts who played a more physical Canadian game and drew more penalties. The Soviets researched their Canadian opponent in advance, and fore-checked aggressively and beat the Canadians to the puck. The Lyndhursts trailed by a 4–0 score after the first period, and by a 7–1 score after the second period. The Lyndhursts scored the only goal in the third period and lost by a 7–2 score, to place second overall at the World Championships behind the Soviet Union team. The Lyndhursts would have earned silver had medals been awarded.

The top two points scorers in the tournament were both Lyndhursts. Maurice Galand scored 20 points (16 goals and 4 assists) and Eric Unger scored 17 points (8 goals, 9 assists). The IIHF World Championship directorate awards were first given out in 1954, and Don Lockhart was recognized as the best goaltender.

=== Reactions in Canada ===
Newspaper headlines the following day in Canada included; "Reds Give Us Lesson in Game We Invented" in the Toronto Daily Star, "No one but the CAHA can be held responsible for Canada's defeat" in The London Free Press, and "Perhaps the defeat of Canada by the Russians is the best thing that could have happened" in the Winnipeg Free Press. Journalist Elmer Ferguson wrote in the Montreal Herald, that it was "a national calamity, a national humiliation, and a mortifying experience". Despite pleas from the Canada public, the Government of Canada vowed not the get involved in the business of hockey, and would not provide funds for a team to represent Canada internationally.

CAHA president W. B. George stated that the final game was the worst he had seen the Lyndhursts play and that they seemed afraid of being penalized. He felt that the Lyndhursts lacked the experience necessary to deal with the political situation in Europe, and believed that much of the criticism by newspapers in Sweden had been anti-Canadian propaganda. He recommended that Canada continue to play at the World Championships, and denied reports from East York's manager that spectators in Sweden treated the Canadian team unfairly.

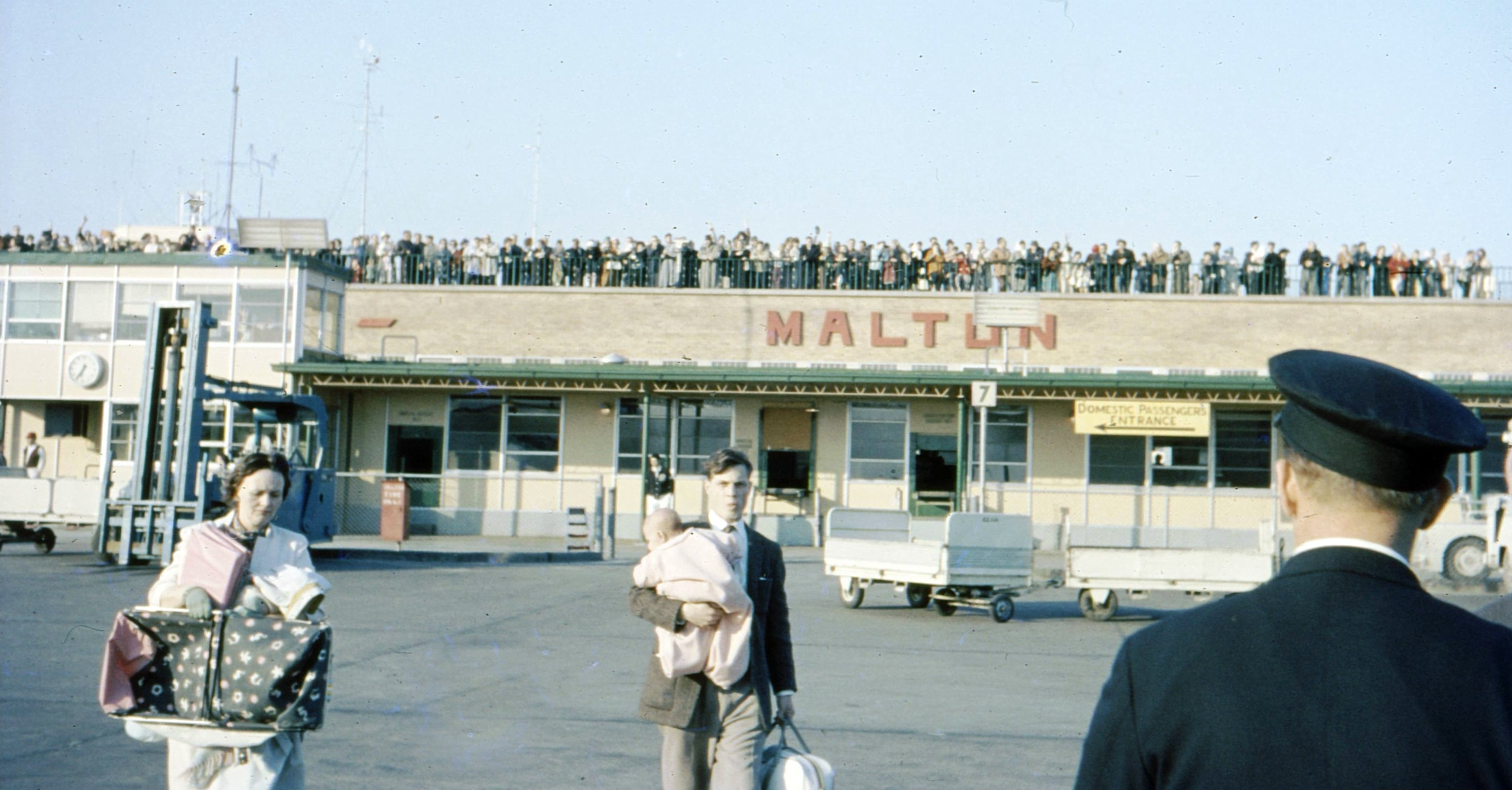
Malton Airport c. 1960

Canadian reporters waited at Malton Airport to interview players as they arrived, and even questioned Eric Unger while he was in the restroom. Don Lockhart felt the Lyndhursts would have won easily if physical contact was allowed in the international game. Other players on the team were disappointed with how the loss was perceived in Canada. Reg Spragge remarked that, "You would have thought we lost World War Three, not a hockey game"; whereas George Sayliss felt that, "I think we got more publicity over losing than if we'd won it". Norm Gray summarized the financial frustrations by saying, "Nobody in this country as far as government officials would give any money towards sending us over there. The moment we lost the game, it was a whole different ball game.

George Dudley invited suggestions on how the CAHA could better form the team. He believed that the best eligible teams were the senior A-level and junior A-level teams, but the cost of sending them would be prohibitive. He also noted that the timing of the World Championships coincided with playoffs in Canada, and it required at least 15 days away their schedule in Canada if a team travelled to Europe and return by airplane. Dudley stated that no team would agree to leave at a critical team in their domestic season, and that teams would not generate revenue for the trip without the customary series of exhibition games. Profits from the Allan Cup and Memorial Cup playoffs would not sustain the cost of flying a team to Europe annually.

=== Long-term impact ===
Writer Michael McKinley referred to the loss by the Lyndhursts to the Soviets as a "day of reckoning" in Canada, and a symbol of what went wrong with the CAHA's international strategy. It was the beginning the a rivalry between Canada and the Soviet Union, and increased interest by the Canadian public in the Ice Hockey World Championships. Journalist Scott Young wrote that any game versus the Soviet Union became a matter of national honour and pride for Canadians, and a concerted effort was made to regain the title when the Penticton Vees were unanimously selected to represent Canada at the 1955 Ice Hockey World Championships with ample finances and resources to support the team. By 1968, the Government of Canada promised to become involved, and established a dedicated management group for the national team that became Hockey Canada.

== Team legacy ==
Former mayor of East York Alan Redway, has lobbied for a local memorial to the team which has been mostly forgotten. Team member George Sayliss donated his sweater and other memorabilia to the Peterborough and District Sports Hall of Fame on display within the Peterborough Memorial Centre.

== Bibliography ==
- Denault, Todd (2011). The Greatest Game: The Montreal Canadiens, the Red Army, and the Night That Saved Hockey. Toronto, Ontario: McClelland & Stewart. ISBN 978-0-7710-2635-5 – via Google Books.
- Smith, Stephen (2014). Puckstruck: Distracted, Delighted and Distressed by Canada's Hockey Obsession. Victoria, British Columbia: Greystone Books. ISBN 978-1-77164-048-0 – via Google Books.
- Redway, Alan (2018). East York 1924-1997: Toronto's Garden of Eden. Victoria, British Columbia: Friesen Press. ISBN 978-1-5255-2937-5 – via Google Books.
- McKinley, Michael (2014). It's Our Game: Celebrating 100 Years Of Hockey Canada. Toronto, Ontario: Viking Press. ISBN 978-0-670-06817-3.
- Duplacey, James (1998). Total Hockey: The official encyclopedia of the National Hockey League. Kingston, New York: Total Sports Publishing. ISBN 0-8362-7114-9.
- Annual Report: Constitution, Regulations and Rules of Competition. Cambridge, Ontario: Ontario Hockey Association. 2006.
- McKinley, Michael (2006). Hockey: A People's History. Toronto, Ontario: McClelland & Stewart. ISBN 978-0-7710-5769-4.
- Young, Scott (1989). 100 Years of Dropping the Puck. Toronto, Ontario: McClelland & Stewart. ISBN 0-7710-9093-5.
