= Georgian Bay District Secondary School =

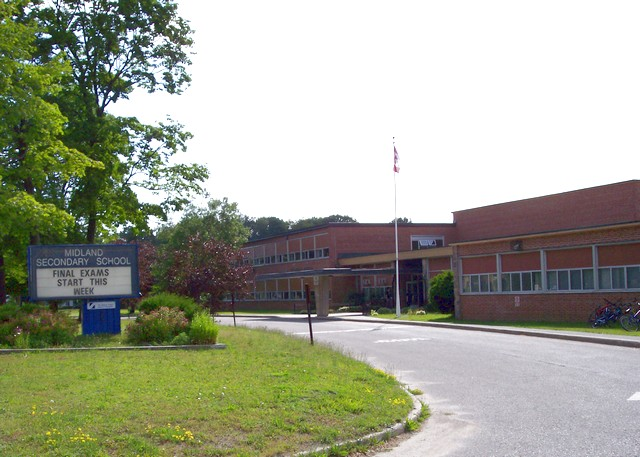

Location
- 925 Hugel Ave; Midland, Ontario, L4R 1X8; Canada; 44.7438°N 79.8994°W

Information
- Former names: Midland Secondary School, Penetanguishene Secondary School
- School type: Public, High school
- Motto: Latin: scientiae non est vicarius ("For knowledge there is no substitute")
- Founded: 1904
- School board: Simcoe County District School Board
- School district: 1
- Superintendent: Peter McLean
- Principal: Allison Reid
- Grades: 9 to 12
- Enrollment: 915 (2020–21)
- Language: English
- Area: Midland, Ontario
- Colours: Maroon and Silver
- Team name: Bears
- Website: gbd.scdsb.on.ca

Georgian Bay District SS ("GBDSS") is a Public high school in Midland, Simcoe County, in Central Ontario, Canada. Students attend from Midland/Penetanguishene and surrounding areas including Hillsdale, Port McNicoll, Waubaushene, Victoria Harbour, Honey Harbour, Wyevale and Christian Island. The principal is Allison Reid.

GBDSS offers open, applied and academic courses in Grade 9 through 12, a Life Skills program and two off-site Alternative Learning Programs, one with a focus on Native culture. GBDSS offers e-learning courses in addition to regular classes. All school programs focused on academics, co-curricular, and community involvement.

In 2014, an announcement was made that Midland SS and Penetanguishene SS would amalgamate, due to the declining enrollment of both schools. PSS closed at the end of the 2015–16 school year, with its 350 students joining the 500 students at the existing MSS building, which could accommodate up to 1,400 students, while construction of the new school took place. Construction began in the spring of 2016, and was expected to open in September 2018; however, in July of that year it was announced that it would not be ready. A new completion date was not provided. The new building opened for students on February 4, 2019.

Students at the school are involved in Student Council initiatives; international student exchanges; co-curricular programs associated with music, art, and drama; a variety of special interest clubs; and athletics.

GBDSS is located in area "A" of the school board, the superintendent is Peter McLean.

== Notable alumni ==
- George Dudley, inductee of the Hockey Hall of Fame and Canadian Amateur Hockey Association executive

== See also ==
- Education in Ontario
- List of secondary schools in Ontario
- Simcoe Muskoka Catholic District School Board
