= Jack Komar =

American judge

Judge Jack Komar is a Superior Court Judge of Santa Clara County, California. He succeeded Justice Ronald B. Robie, of the California Court of Appeal, Third Appellate District. Before joining the bench in 1985, Judge Komar was in general civil and criminal practice in San Jose, California for 16 years and was deputy district attorney for Santa Clara County from 1966 to 1969. He served as the court's presiding judge from 1999 through 2000.
