= Dicky Komar =

Indonesian diplomat (born 1964)

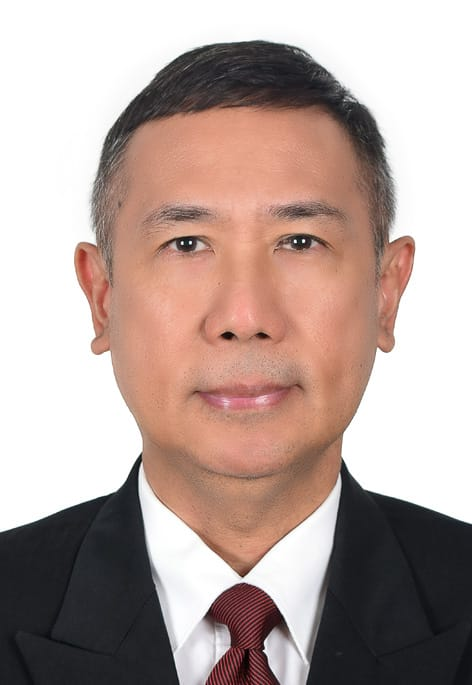

Ambassador of Indonesia to Lebanon
- Incumbent
- Assumed office 24 March 2025
- Preceded by: Hajriyanto Y. Thohari

Personal details
- Born: July 16, 1964 (age 61)
- Spouse: Chatarina Wieke Larasati
- Education: Padjadjaran University (Drs.) ? (M.I.S)

Dicky Komar (born 16 July 1964) is an Indonesian diplomat who is currently serving as Indonesia's ambassador to Lebanon since 2025. A career diplomat, Dicky has served as the deputy chief of mission at the embassy in Bangkok, Thailand, and chargés d'affaires ad interim to Myanmar.

== Diplomatic career ==
Born on 16 July 1964, Dicky commenced his studies in international relations at the Padjadjaran University in 1983. Upon graduating, Dicky briefly worked at a bank before joining the diplomatic service in March 1990. He had been posted at the political section of the mission to the European Communities with the rank of second secretary since 8 March 1997. After a stint in Brussels, Dicky was reassigned to the mission to the United Nations in New York, where he was entrusted with the same duties. He was later promoted to the rank of first secretary by 2005 and counsellor by 2006. Dicky became the vice chairperson/rapporteur for the fifty-first and fifty-second sessions of the Commission on the Status of Women.

After his stint in New York, by 2008 Dicky was named as the deputy director for civil and political rights. He then returned to representing Indonesia at the United Nations, serving at the mission in Geneva with the rank of minister counsellor. After his service in Geneva, by 2015 he returned to Indonesia to took up office as director of human rights of humanitarian affairs within the foreign ministry. Dicky retained his position following reorganizations within the foreign ministry in early 2017. During his tenure, he oversaw Indonesia's membership within the United Nations Human Rights Council. Dicky, on behalf of Indonesia, opposed the adoption of the United Nations Resolutions on sexual orientation, gender identity and sex characteristics, stating that the proposal is based on a concept that is "divisive" and "lacking in recognition". Dicky also played a role in Indonesia's Universal Periodic Review to the council.

On 3 April 2018, Dicky became the deputy chief of mission at the embassy in Bangkok, serving under ambassador Ahmad Rusdi. Between the departure of Ahmad and the arrival of Rachmat Budiman in 2020, Dicky became the embassy's chargés d'affaires ad interim. As chargés d'affaires, Dicky organized a virtual trade exhibition and bilateral business meetings.

Following the 2021 Myanmar coup d'état, Indonesia recalled its ambassador to Myanmar as it refused to acknowledge the legitimacy of the military junta. Dicky was sent to led the Indonesian embassy there and assumed duties as chargés d'affaires ad interim on 31 May 2023.

In August 2024, President Joko Widodo nominated Dicky as Indonesia's ambassador to Lebanon. He passed a fit and proper test held by the House of Representative's first commission in September that year and was installed by President Prabowo Subianto on 24 March 2025. Dicky presented his credentials to president Joseph Aoun on 1 July 2025.

== Personal life ==
Dicky is married to Chatarina Wieke Larasati.
