= Komor (surname) =

Komor is a surname. It may refer to:

- Agnieszka Gorgoń-Komor (born 1970), Polish politician
- Aleksander Komor (born 1994), Polish footballer
- Michael Komor (born 1960), Welsh Anglican priest
- Paul Komor, Hungarian businessman and diplomat
- Sebastian Komor (born 1976), Polish-Norwegian musician

== See also ==
- Komar (surname)
