= Don Lockhart =

Canadian ice hockey player

- Born: February 28, 1931 Toronto, Ontario, Canada
- Died: April 6, 1982 (aged 51) Toronto, Ontario, Canada
- Height: 5 ft 11 in (180 cm)
- Weight: 190 lb (86 kg; 13 st 8 lb)
- Position: Goaltender
- Shot: Left
- Played for: East York Lyndhursts; Toronto Marlboros; Moncton Hawks; Glace Bay Miners
- National team: Canada
- Playing career: 1946–1955
Medal record
Men's ice hockey
Silver medal – second place	1954 Stockholm	Ice hockey

Donald John Lockhart (February 28, 1931 – April 6, 1982), was a Canadian ice hockey player who was a member of the Canadian team at the 1954 Ice Hockey World Championships in Stockholm, Sweden, and won a silver medal.

== Career ==
Lockhart played ice hockey for the Toronto Marlboros juniors and seniors, then moved on to the Moncton Hawks, Glace Bay Miners and Niagara Falls Cataracts.

When the East York Lyndhursts were selected to represent Canada at the 1954 Championships, Lockhart was added as the goaltender for the team and played all seven games, notching two shutouts, being named the best goaltender.
