= Komarov (surname) =

Komarov (Russian: Комаров, from комар meaning mosquito) is a Russian masculine surname; its feminine counterpart is Komarova. It may refer to:

- Aleksandr Komarov (wrestler) (Russian: Александр Андреевич Комаров; born 1999), Russian Greco-Roman wrestler
- Aleksandr Komarov (ice hockey) (Russian: Александр Георгиевич Комаров; 1923–2013), Soviet ice hockey player
- Aleksey Komarov (1921–2013), Russian Olympic rower
- Alexey Komarov (1879–1977), Russian wildlife artist
- Dimitri Komarov (born 1968), Ukrainian chess grandmaster
- Igor Komarov (born 1964), director of Roscosmos since 2015
- Leo Komarov (born 1987), Finnish ice hockey player
- Mikhail Yuryevich Komarov (b. 1984), Russian footballer
- Mykola Komarov (born 1961), Soviet rower
- Natalia Komarova (b. 1971), Russian-American mathematician
- Natalya Komarova (born 1955), Russian politician
- Nikolay Komarov (politician) (1886–1937), Russian revolutionary and a Soviet politician in 10th Orgburo of the Russian Communist Party (Bolsheviks)
- Nikolay Vasilyevich Komarov (1831–?), Russian non-commissioned officer and founder of Vladivostok
- Oleksandr Komarov (Ukrainian: Олександр Комаров; born 1972) is a Ukrainian telecommunications top-level manager, CEO of Kyivstar
- Oleksandr Komarov (Ukrainian: Олександр Комаров; born 1988) is a Ukrainian Paralympic swimmer
- Stanislava Komarova (born 1986), Russian swimmer
- Tatyana Komarova (1952–2010), Russian journalist
- Vissarion Komarov (1832–1908), Russian journalist and editor; Serbian Army general
- Vladimir Komarov (1927–1967), Soviet cosmonaut, killed on landing of the Soyuz 1 mission.
  - Kosmonaut Vladimir Komarov, satellite tracking ship, named after him
- Vladimir Komarov (footballer) (born 1980), Russian association football player
- Vladimir Komarov (speed skater) (1949-2018), Olympic speed skater
- Vladimir Andreyevich Komarov (born 1976), Russian musician
- Vladimir Leontyevich Komarov (1869–1945), Russian botanist
- Vyacheslav Komarov (born 1950), Russian football coach and player
- Yelena Komarova (born 1985), Azerbaijani wrestler
- Yury Komarov (businessman) (born 1945), Russian businessman
- Yury Komarov (footballer) (born 1954), Russian footballer
