= Yury Komarov (footballer) =

Russian footballer

Personal information
- Full name: Yury Vasilyevich Komarov
- Date of birth: 2 August 1954 (age 72)
- Height: 1.72 m (5 ft 8 in)
- Position: Defender

Youth career
- FC Dynamo Moscow

Senior career*
Years	Team	Apps	(Gls)
1972–1974	FC Dynamo Moscow	0	(0)
1975–1977	FC Zenit Izhevsk	99	(5)
1978–1979	FC Znamya Truda Orekhovo-Zuyevo		
- * Club domestic league appearances and goals

Yury Vasilyevich Komarov (Russian: Юрий Васильевич Комаров; born 2 August 1954) is a former Russian professional footballer.

== Club career ==
He made his professional debut in the Soviet Second League in 1975 for FC Zenit Izhevsk. He played 1 game in the UEFA Cup 1974–75 for FC Dynamo Moscow.
