= Aleksandr Komarov (ice hockey) =

Soviet-born Russian ice hockey player

- Born: 25 July 1923
- Died: 22 November 2013 (aged 90)
- SHL team: HC CSKA Moscow

Aleksandr Georgijewitsch Komarov (Russian: Александр Георгиевич Комаров; 25 July 1923 − 22 November 2013) was a Soviet ice hockey player who played for HC CSKA Moscow in the Soviet Hockey League. He was inducted into the Russian and Soviet Hockey Hall of Fame in 1954.
