= 1954 Ice Hockey World Championships =

1954 edition of the IIHF World Ice Hockey Championship

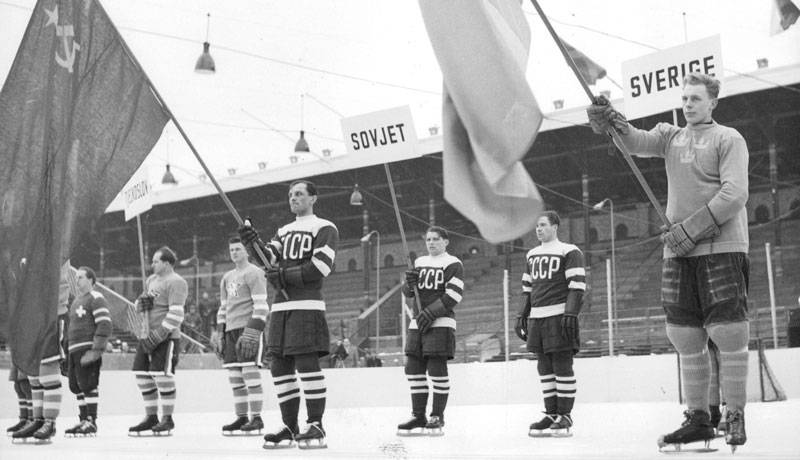
- Opening ceremony

Tournament details
- Host country: Sweden
- Dates: 26 February – 7 March
- Teams: 8

Final positions
- Champions: Soviet Union (1st title)
- Runners-up: Canada
- Third place: Sweden
- Fourth place: Czechoslovakia

Tournament statistics
- Games played: 28
- Goals scored: 222 (7.93 per game)
- Attendance: 148,399 (5,300 per game)
- Scoring leader: (Canada) Moe Galand (20 points)

The 1954 Ice Hockey World Championships, were the 21st World Championships and 32nd European ice hockey championships were held from 26 February to 7 March 1954 in Stockholm, Sweden. Every team played each other once with the top three finishers receiving medals at the end. The USSR won in its first attempt, led by Vsevolod Bobrov who was recognized as the best forward of the tournament in the first ever presentation of Directorate Awards.

== Description ==
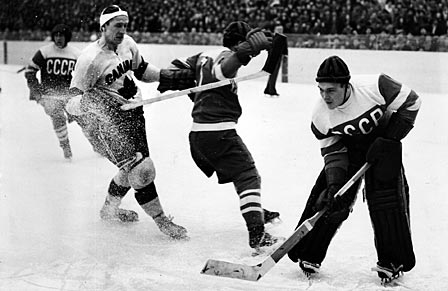
Soviet Union–Canada match. The Soviets, playing in their first World Championships, defeated Canada 7–2 in the final game to win the gold medal.

The USSR won their first five games before meeting up with the host, and defending champion, Sweden. Sweden, having already lost 8-0 to Canada, desperately needed to beat the Soviets, but settled for a 1–1 tie. The final game of the tournament pitted the East York Lyndhursts, representing Canada, against the USSR, both teams being undefeated. Tournament organizers believed the Canadians would cruise to their seventh straight win and had begun to sell tickets for a planned tie-breaking game between the Soviets and Swedes to determine the European Championship. However the Soviets "appeared to pass too much, check too little, and skate too fast" and "thoroughly dominated" in a 7–2 win before 16,000 fans.

Canadian Amateur Hockey Association (CAHA) president W. B. George stated that the final game was the worst he had seen the Lyndhursts play and that they seemed afraid of being penalized. The CAHA was heavily criticized by media in Canada for the failure to win the World Championships, and writer Michael McKinley stated the loss was a "day of reckoning" and a symbol of what went wrong with the CAHA's international strategy, and the beginning of a hockey rivalry with the Soviet Union.

Beginning with this year the IIHF began giving out official awards (known as the "directorate awards") to the best forward, defensemen, and goaltender, of the tournament.

In 2013, the Soviet national team was awarded the IIHF Milestone Award for winning the gold medal, which was their country's first appearance at the World Championships and the beginning of a rivalry versus Canada.

== Final round ==
26 February	Czechoslovakia	7–1	Switzerland

26 February	Soviet Union	7–1	Finland

26 February	Sweden	10–1	Norway

27 February	Canada	8–1	Switzerland

27 February	Soviet Union	7–0	Norway

27 February	Czechoslovakia	9–4	West Germany

28 February	Canada	8–0	Norway

28 February	Switzerland	3–3	West Germany

28 February	Sweden	5–3	Finland

1 March	Czechoslovakia	12–1	Finland

1 March	Soviet Union	6–2	West Germany

1 March	Sweden	0–8	Canada

2 March	Finland	2–0	Norway

2 March	Soviet Union	5–2	Czechoslovakia

2 March	Sweden	6–3	Switzerland

3 March	Czechoslovakia	7–1	Norway

3 March	Canada	8–1	West Germany

3 March	Soviet Union	4–2	Switzerland

4 March	Switzerland	2–3	Norway

4 March	Canada	20–1	Finland

4 March	Sweden	4–0	West Germany

5 March	West Germany	5–1	Finland

5 March	Canada	5–2	Czechoslovakia

5 March	Sweden	1–1	Soviet Union

6 March	Finland	3–3	Switzerland

6 March	Sweden	4–2	Czechoslovakia

7 March	West Germany	7–1	Norway

7 March	Soviet Union	7–2	Canada

=== Standings ===
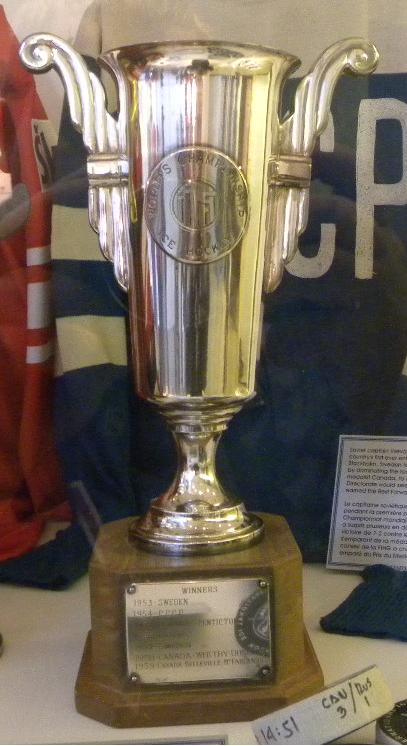
Trophy awarded for the 1954 World Championships

Pos	Team	Pld	W	D	L	GF	GA	GD	Pts
1	Soviet Union	7	6	1	0	37	10	+27	13
2	Canada	7	6	0	1	59	12	+47	12
3	Sweden	7	5	1	1	30	18	+12	11
4	Czechoslovakia	7	4	0	3	41	21	+20	8
5	West Germany	7	2	1	4	22	32	−10	5
6	Finland	7	1	1	5	12	52	−40	3
7	Switzerland	7	0	2	5	15	34	−19	2
8	Norway	7	1	0	6	6	43	−37	2

==== Team members ====
Soviet Union

- Nikolai Puchkov
- Grigori Mkrtychan
- Alfred Kuchevsky
- Dmitri Ukolov
- Alexander Vinogradov
- Genrikh Sidorenkov
- Vsevolod Bobrov
- Viktor Shuvalov
- Alexei Guryshev
- Yuri Krylov
- Mikhail Bychkov
- Alexander Uvarov
- Valentin Kusin
- Yevgeni Babich
- Nikolai Khlystov
- Alexander Komarov

=== Tournament awards ===
- Best players selected by the directorate:
  - Best Goaltender: (Canada) Don Lockhart
  - Best Defenceman: (Sweden) Lasse Björn
  - Best Forward: (Soviet Union) Vsevolod Bobrov

=== European Championships final rankings ===
1. Soviet Union
2. Sweden
3. Czechoslovakia
4. West Germany
5. Finland
6. Switzerland
7. Norway
