= Athlete of the Year =

Award given by various sports organizations

Athlete of the Year (sometimes abbreviated as AOY) is an award given by various sports organizations for the athlete whom they have determined to be deserving of such recognition.

== Definition of "athlete" ==
- In many nations, an "athlete" primarily refers to someone who participates in the various disciplines of athletics (track and field, racewalking, cross country and road running)
- In other nations — including Canada and the United States — an "athlete" equals "sportsperson" (from any sport).

== Similar names for the award ==
The awards have various titles, examples include "Player of the Year" and "Sportspersonality of the Year". In the United States, several states choose a simple "Mr." or "Miss" prefix, such as Mr. Basketball (Illinois, Indiana, Iowa, Kentucky, Michigan, North Dakota, Utah, and Wisconsin). Such awards — general and one-sport-only — are common at the high-school, college (university), and professional levels in the United States.

== List of athlete of the year awards ==
=== Athletics (track and field) ===
- World's Greatest Athlete (decathlon for men, heptathlon for women)
- World Athlete of the Year (World Athletics formerly known as the IAAF)
- European Athlete of the Year (European Athletic Association)
- Track & Field News Athlete of the Year
- The Bowerman (collegiate track & field's athlete of the year)

=== All sports ===
==== Worldwide ====
Awards with deliberate global scope, consistently nominating an international mix of athletes

- Laureus World Sports Awards
- TIME Athlete of the Year
- L'Équipe Champion of Champions—excludes French nationals
- BBC World Sport Star of the Year—excludes British nationals
- The Sporting News Athlete of the Year
- United Press International Athlete of the Year Award
- Gazzetta Sports Awards
- Giuseppe Sciacca International Awards Sports Prize
- United States Sports Academy Athlete of the Year

==== Continental ====
- European Sportsperson of the Year

==== Regional ====
- BTA Best Balkan Athlete of the Year

==== Nationwide ====
Awards that focus (either predominantly or exclusively) on sportspersons from the host country

Algeria

- Algeria Best Athletes of the Year

Argentina

- Olimpia Award

Australia

- AIS Athlete of the Year

Austria

- Austrian Sportspersonality of the year

Belgium

- Belgian Sportsman of the year

Bosnia and Herzegovina

- Bosnia and Herzegovina Sportsperson of the Year

Brazil

- Prêmio Brasil Olímpico

Bulgaria

- Bulgarian Sportsperson of the Year

Canada

- Lou Marsh Trophy (athlete of the year, of either sex)
- Lionel Conacher Award (male athlete of the year)
- Bobbie Rosenfeld Award (female athlete of the year)
- Velma Springstead Trophy (female athlete of the year)
- Tom Longboat Awards (indigenous athletes)

Croatia

- Sportske novosti awards

Czech Republic

- Sportsperson of the Year

Denmark

- Danish Sports Name of the Year

Estonia

- Estonian Sportspersonality of the year

Finland

- Finnish Sports Personality of the Year

France

- L'Équipe Champion of Champions

Germany

- German Sportspersonality of the Year

Greece

- PSAT Sports Awards

Hungary

- Hungarian Sportspeople of the Year

Iceland

- Icelandic Sportsperson of the Year

India

- Khel Ratna Award

Iran

- Iran Sportsperson of the year

Ireland

- RTÉ Sports Person of the Year

Italy

- Gazzetta Sports Awards
- Giuseppe Sciacca International Awards Sports Prize

Jamaica

- Jamaica Sportsman and Sportswoman of the Year

Japan

- Japan Professional Sports Grand Prize

Kenya

- Kenyan Sports Personality of the Year

Latvia

- Latvian Sportspersonality of the year

Lithuania

- Lithuanian Sportsman of the Year

Luxembourg

- Luxembourgish Sportspeople of the Year

Malaysia

- Anugerah Sukan Negara for Sportsman of the Year
- Anugerah Sukan Negara for Sportswoman of the Year

Moldova

- Moldovan Sportsman of the year

Montenegro

- Sportsperson of the Year

Netherlands

- Dutch Sportsman of the year

New Zealand

- Halberg Awards

Norway

- Norwegian Sportsperson of the Year

Philippines

- PSA Sportsman of the Year

Poland

- Polish Sportspersonality of the Year

Portugal

- CDP Awards

Serbia

- Golden badge Sport—athlete of the year

Slovakia

- Sportsperson of the Year

Slovenia

- Slovenian Sportsman of the year

South Africa

- South African Sportsperson of the Year

Spain

- Premios Nacionales del Deporte

Sweden

- Svenska Dagbladet Gold Medal
- Radiosportens Jerringpris
- Svenska idrottsgalan

Switzerland

- Swiss Sports Personality of the Year

Ukraine

- Heroes of Sports Year

United Kingdom

- BBC Sports Personality of the Year Award
- BBC Northern Ireland Sports Personality of the Year
- BBC Scotland Sports Personality of the Year
- BBC Wales Sports Personality of the Year

United States
The presence of "Sportsman" in the name doesn't imply that the award is open solely to men; women have frequently won these awards.

- Associated Press Athlete of the Year (AP)
- Best Female Athlete ESPY Award
- Best Male Athlete ESPY Award
- Sporting News Sportsman/Pro Athlete of the Year
- Sports Illustrated Sportsperson of the Year
- USOC Athlete of the Year
- Sportswoman of the Year Award (Women's Sports Foundation)
- United Press International Athlete of the Year Award (UPI) (defunct)
- NCAA Woman of the Year Award (student-athlete)
- Best Female College Athlete ESPY Award
- Best Male College Athlete ESPY Award
- Atlantic Coast Conference Athlete of the Year (ACC)
- Big Ten Athlete of the Year

Vanuatu

- Vanuatu Sports Awards

==== Defunct ====
Czechoslovakia

- Czechoslovakia Sportsperson of the Year

USSR

- Soviet Union top ten athletes of the year

Yugoslavia

- DSL Sport Golden Badge Best Athlete
- Sportske novosti Athlete of the Year

=== One sport (other than track and field) ===
- International Baseball Federation Senior Athlete of the Year
- U.S. Soccer Athlete of the Year (U.S. Soccer Federation) (association football)
- Golden Year Award at association football, Neymar last winner
- Leigh Matthews Trophy (Australian Football League) (Australian rules football)
- Canadian Football League Most Outstanding Player Award (Canadian football)
- GAA All Stars Awards (Gaelic games)
  - All Stars Footballer of the Year (Gaelic football)
  - All Stars Hurler of the Year (hurling)
  - Ladies' Gaelic football All Stars Awards (Ladies' Gaelic football)
  - Camogie All Stars Awards (camogie)
  - Rounders All Stars Awards (rounders)
- National Football League Most Valuable Player Award (U.S.) (American football)
- Nippon Professional Baseball Most Valuable Player Award (Japan)
- MLB Most Valuable Player Award (Major League Baseball) (U.S. & Canada)
- Players Choice Awards Player of the Year (Major League Baseball) (U.S. & Canada)
- Sporting News Player of the Year (Major League Baseball) (U.S. & Canada)
- Sporting News MLB Athlete of the Decade (Major League Baseball) (U.S. & Canada)
- ACC Men's Basketball Player of the Year (Atlantic Coast Conference) (college/university) (U.S.)
- Baseball America High School Player of the Year Award (U.S.)

== See also ==
- Rookie of the Year (award)
