= Ed Christofoli =

Canadian ice hockey player

- Born: January 2, 1939 (age 87) Trail, British Columbia, Canada
- Height: 5 ft 11 in (180 cm)
- Weight: 176 lb (80 kg; 12 st 8 lb)
- Position: Defense
- Shot: Left
- Played for: Trail Smoke Eaters
- National team: Canada
- Playing career: 1956–1965
Medal record
Men's ice hockey
Gold medal – first place	1961 Switzerland	Ice hockey

Edmund Luciano Christofoli (born January 2, 1939) was a Canadian ice hockey player with the Trail Smoke Eaters. He won a gold medal at the 1961 World Ice Hockey Championships in Switzerland.
