= Josef Mikoláš =

- Born: 23 January 1938; Frýdek-Místek, Czechoslovakia
- Died: 20 March 2015 (aged 77)
- Position: Goaltender
- ČSHL team: VŽKG Vítkovice; VTŽ Chomutov
- National team: Czechoslovakia
- Playing career: 1956–1970

Medal record

Representing Czechoslovakia

Men's ice hockey

World Championships
Silver medal – second place	1961 Geneva	Ice hockey
Bronze medal – third place	1963 Stockholm	Ice hockey

Josef Mikoláš (Czech pronunciation: [ˈjozɛf ˈmɪkolaːʃ], 23 January 1938 – 20 March 2015) was a Czechoslovak ice hockey goaltender of the 1950s and 1960s. His biggest success came in 1961 when he helped the Czechoslovak national ice hockey team win silver medals at the World Ice Hockey Championships in Geneva, Switzerland and in 1963 when they took bronze in Stockholm, Sweden. Altogether he played in 29 matches for the national team.

== Early life ==
Josef Mikoláš was born to a single mother and had three younger siblings. When he was a small boy, he suffered from several serious illnesses, including pneumonia and rickets. When he was five years old, he still could not walk. Despite this he later attended a coal mining apprentice school in Ostrava and worked as a coal miner after he finished it. He lived in Ostrava and started his ice hockey career here.

== Ice hockey career ==
Josef Mikoláš started playing for ice-hockey team Pracovní zálohy Ostrava in 1956, but soon he came to another Ostrava team, VŽKG Vítkovice, who were playing in the Czechoslovak First Ice Hockey League, the highest league in former Czechoslovakia. He quickly got recognition for both his goaltender's skills and courage with which he faced the shots, although he was not wearing any head protection in that time.

In 1959 he was elected the best Czechoslovak goaltender of the season. His career culminated in 1961, when he was nominated into the Czechoslovak national ice hockey team for the World Ice Hockey Championships in Geneva, Switzerland. The team won most of the matches and surprisingly beat even the Soviet Union 6–4. They drew with Canada 1–1 and finally took silver due to Canada's better overall score. For his performance Josef Mikoláš won the trophy of the Czechoslovak Sportsperson of the Year. In 1962 the World Championships took place in Colorado Springs, USA, but the Soviet Union and Czechoslovakia boycotted the tournament. In 1963 they took bronze at the World Championships in Stockholm, Sweden.

=== Injuries ===
Josef Mikoláš was acknowledged for his courage, with which he faced the puck although he did not wear face protection. In his time only some goaltenders experimented with home-made masks, but he refused to use any. Throughout his career he lost eight teeth and suffered a broken cheekbone, double fracture of his lower jaw and 35 sutured injuries. As the most painful he described a shot of Karel Gut, which cost him four teeth at one moment. Altogether he had about eighty stitches all over his head. He tried wearing a goaltender mask only a short time before the end of his career.

== End of the career and off-ice life ==
Soon after the World Championships in Sweden Mikoláš's career started declining. In 1965 he got divorced and moved to Chomutov, where he got married again and played for VTŽ Chomutov until 1968. Then he returned to Ostrava but in 1970 he finally finished his ice hockey career and worked as a sports journalist. He had three daughters. On 20 March 2015, he died after an illness.
