= Dave Rusnell =

Canadian ice hockey player

- Born: July 31, 1933 (age 93) Wadena, Saskatchewan, Canada
- Height: 5 ft 10 in (178 cm)
- Weight: 170 lb (77 kg; 12 st 2 lb)
- Position: Centre
- Shot: Right
- Played for: Trail Smoke Eaters; Spokane Comets; Rossland Warriors; Kimberley Dynamiters
- National team: Canada
- Playing career: 1949–1968
Medal record
Men's ice hockey
Gold medal – first place	1961 Switzerland	Ice hockey

David K. Rusnell (born July 31, 1933), was a Canadian ice hockey player with the Trail Smoke Eaters. He won a gold medal at the 1961 World Ice Hockey Championships in Switzerland. He also played with the Spokane Comets, Kimberley Dynamiters, and Rossland Warriors.
