= Mike Lagace =

Canadian ice hockey player

Mike Legace
- Born: October 16, 1936 (age 90) Quebec City, Quebec, Canada
- Height: 5 ft 10 in (178 cm)
- Weight: 160 lb (73 kg; 11 st 6 lb)
- Position: Right wing
- Shot: Right
- Played for: Trail Smoke Eaters; Montreal Royals; St. Paul Saints; Quebec Aces
- National team: Canada
- Playing career: 1951–1965
Medal record
Men's ice hockey
| Gold medal – first place | 1961 Switzerland | Ice hockey |

Michel Lagace (born October 16, 1936) was a Canadian ice hockey player with the Trail Smoke Eaters. He won a gold medal at the 1961 World Ice Hockey Championships in Switzerland. He also played with the Montreal Royals, St. Paul Saints and Quebec Aces.
