= United Press International Athlete of the Year Award =

Annual sports award (1974–1996)

The United Press International Athlete of the Year Award was conferred annually between 1974 and 1996, one each to the individuals adjudged, without restriction to nationality or sport contested, to be the male and female athlete of the year by a panel of sportswriters and editors constituted under the auspices of the United Press International.

== Male winners ==
Year	Athlete	Nation represented	Sport
1974	Muhammad Ali	United States	Boxing
1975	João Carlos de Oliveira	Brazil	Athletics
1976	Alberto Juantorena	Cuba	Athletics
1977	Alberto Juantorena	Cuba	Athletics
1978	Henry Rono	Kenya	Athletics
1979	Sebastian Coe	United Kingdom	Athletics
1980	Eric Heiden	United States	Speed skating
1981	Sebastian Coe	United Kingdom	Athletics
1982	Daley Thompson	United Kingdom	Athletics
1983	Carl Lewis	United States	Athletics
1984	Carl Lewis	United States	Athletics
1985	Steve Cram	United Kingdom	Athletics
1986	Diego Maradona	Argentina	Football
1987	Ben Johnson	Canada	Athletics
1988	Matt Biondi	United States	Swimming
1989	Boris Becker	West Germany	Tennis
1990	Stefan Edberg	Sweden	Tennis
1991	Sergey Bubka	USSR	Athletics
1992	Kevin Young	United States	Athletics
1993	Miguel Indurain	Spain	Road cycling
1994	Johann Olav Koss	Norway	Speed skating
1995	Jonathan Edwards	United Kingdom	Athletics
1996	Stewart Ellis	United States	General

== Female winners ==
Year	Athlete	Nation represented	Sport
1974	Irena Szewińska	Poland	Athletics
1975	Nadia Comăneci	Romania	Artistic gymnastics
1976	Nadia Comăneci	Romania	Artistic gymnastics
1977	Rosemarie Ackermann	East Germany	Athletics
1978	Tracy Caulkins	United States	Swimming
1979	Marita Koch	East Germany	Athletics
1980	Hanni Wenzel	Liechtenstein	Alpine skiing
1981	Chris Evert Lloyd	United States	Tennis
1982	Marita Koch	East Germany	Athletics
1983	Jarmila Kratochvílová	Czechoslovakia	Athletics
1984	Martina Navratilova	United States	Tennis
1985	Mary Decker Slaney	United States	Athletics
1986	Heike Drechsler	East Germany	Athletics
1987	Steffi Graf	West Germany	Tennis
1988	Florence Griffith-Joyner	United States	Athletics
1989	Steffi Graf	West Germany	Tennis
1990	Merlene Ottey	Jamaica	Athletics
1991	Monica Seles	SFR Yugoslavia	Tennis
1992	Monica Seles	FR Yugoslavia	Tennis
1993	Wang Junxia	China	Athletics
1994	Le Jingyi	China	Swimming
1995	Gwen Torrence	United States	Athletics

== See also ==
- Athlete of the Year
- Associated Press Athlete of the Year
- Best Female Athlete ESPY Award
- Best Male Athlete ESPY Award
- Sporting News Sportsman/Pro Athlete of the Year
- Sports Illustrated Sportsman of the Year
- Laureus World Sports Award for Sportsman of the Year (Laureus World Sports Academy)
- Laureus World Sports Award for Sportswoman of the Year
- BBC Overseas Sports Personality of the Year
- L'Équipe Champion of Champions Award

== Bibliography ==
- Brown, Gerry, and Morrison, Michael (eds.; 2003). ESPN Information Please Sports Almanac. New York City: ESPN Books and Hyperion (joint). ISBN 0-7868-8715-X.
