= František Doubek =

Czech decathlete

Personal information
- National team: Czech Republic
- Born: 2 April 2002 (age 24)

Sport
- Country: Czech Republic
- Sport: Athletics
- Event: Decathlon

Achievements and titles
- Personal best: Decathlon (junior) : 8169 points (2021) WU20L NU20R
Medal record
World U20 Championships
Gold medal – first place	2021 Nairobi	Decathlon

František Doubek (born 2 April 2002) is a Czech athlete who specializes in the decathlon. He was the gold medallist at the World Athletics U20 Championships in 2021.

Awards
Preceded by Jonáš Forejtek	Czech Junior Athlete of the Year; 2021	Succeeded by Daniel Gracík
