= Sportsperson of the Year (Czechoslovakia) =

Czechoslovak prize Sportsperson of the Year

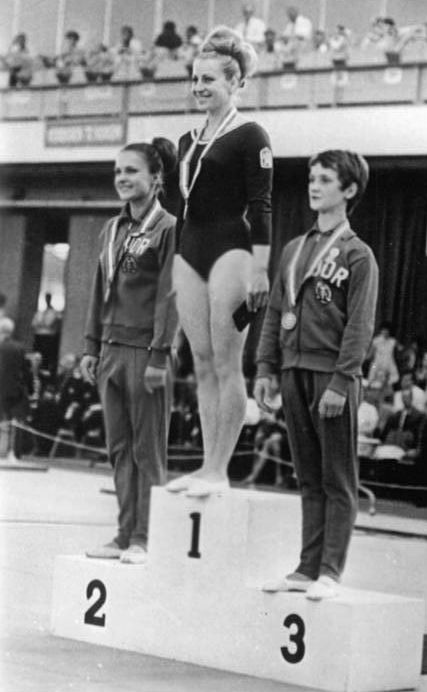
Věra Čáslavská, an artistic gymnast, stands on the top of the podium at the 1967 European Championships.

Sportsperson of the Year (Czech: Sportovec roku, Slovak: Športovec roka) was a prize awarded annually to the best athletes of Czechoslovakia from 1959 to 1992 by the Club of Czechoslovak Sports Journalists. The first winner was white-water canoer Vladimír Jirásek. From 1961 the prize was also given to the best sports team; the first team recipient was the Czechoslovakia national ice hockey team. Since the dissolution of Czechoslovakia in 1993, the prize has continued in both successor countries as the Sportsperson of the Year of the Czech Republic and the Sportsperson of the Year of Slovakia.

The individual prize was usually awarded to a single sportsperson, but on two occasions, two people received it – Eva Romanová and Pavel Roman (ice dancers) in 1962, and the Pospíšil brothers (cycle-ball players) in 1979. The prize was given to 28 different athletes, 22 men and 6 women, in 23 sports disciplines. Gymnast Věra Čáslavská won the prize four times, the most of any sportsperson.She was also the sole recipient to have received it in three consecutive years (from 1966 to 1968). Six individuals were awarded the prize more than once.

The team prize was won by teams in 12 sport disciplines; all winners but one were national teams. The only time members of a sports club team were awarded the Sportsperson of the Year was the Dukla Prague handball team, in 1963. Ice hockey teams were given the award six times – most of all disciplines. Ice hockey goaltender Josef Mikoláš and cross-country skier Květa Jeriová were the only people who won both the individual and the team prize (Mikoláš as a member of the Czechoslovakia national ice hockey team at 1961 World Championships and Jeriová as a member of ski relay at the 1984 Winter Olympics). Men's teams received the prize 20 times, and women's teams won it 3 times. From 1970 to 1977, and in 1979, the team prize was not awarded. The team award was won back to back twice, by the men's national ice hockey team in 1968 and 1969, and by the men's national ski-relay team in 1988 and 1989.

== Individual awards ==
×	Sportsmen

+	Sportswomen

~	Mixed pair

Year	Name	Sport	Achievements in the given year
1959	Vladimír Jirásek^{×}	C1 whitewater slalom	World Championships in Geneva, Switzerland – 1st
1960	Eva Bosáková^{+}	Artistic gymnastics	Summer Olympics in Rome, Italy, balance beam – 1st, team – 2nd
1961	Josef Mikoláš^{×}	Ice hockey (goaltender)	World Championships in Geneva, Switzerland, team – 2nd
1962	Eva Romanová; Pavel Roman^{~}	Ice dancing	World Championships in Prague, Czechoslovakia – 1st European Championships in Geneva, Switzerland – 3rd
1963	Václav Kozák^{×}	Rowing	European Championships in Copenhagen, Denmark, single scull – 1st
1964	Věra Čáslavská^{+}	Artistic gymnastics	Summer Olympics in Tokyo, Japan, all-round – 1st, balance beam – 1st, vault – 1st, team – 2nd
1965	Ludvík Daněk^{×}	Discus throw	World record of 65.22 metres (214 ft) in Sokolov, Czechoslovakia
1966	Věra Čáslavská^{+}	Artistic gymnastics	World Championships in Dortmund, West Germany, team – 1st, all-round – 1st, vault – 1st, balance beam – 2nd, floor exercise – 2nd
1967	Věra Čáslavská^{+}	Artistic gymnastics	European Championships in Amsterdam, Netherlands, all-round – 1st, vault – 1st, uneven bars – 1st, balance beam – 1st, floor exercise – 1st
1968	Věra Čáslavská^{+}	Artistic gymnastics	Summer Olympics in Mexico City, Mexico, all-round – 1st, vault – 1st, uneven bars – 1st, balance beam – 2nd, team – 2nd
1969	Miloslava Rezková^{+}	High jump	European Championships in Athens, Greece – 1st
1970	Ladislav Rygl^{×}	Nordic combined	World Championships in Vysoké Tatry, Czechoslovakia – 1st
1971	Ondrej Nepela^{×}	Figure skating	World Championships in Lyon, France – 1st European Championships in Zürich – 1st
1972	Ludvík Daněk^{×}	Discus throw	Summer Olympics in Munich, West Germany – 1st
1973	Jan Kodeš^{×}	Tennis	Wimbledon Championships – 1st US Open – 2nd
1974	Vítězslav Mácha^{×}	Greco-Roman wrestling	World Championships in Katowice, Poland, 74 kg weight class – 1st European Championships in Madrid, Spain, 74 kg weight class – 2nd
1975	Karel Kodejška^{×}	Ski jumping	Ski flying World Championships in Bad Mitterndorf, Austria – 1st
1976	Anton Tkáč^{×}	Track cycling	Summer Olympics in Montreal, Canada, sprint – 1st
1977	Vítězslav Mácha^{×}	Greco-Roman wrestling	World Championships in Gothenburg, Sweden, 74 kg weight class – 1st
1978	Anton Tkáč^{×}	Track cycling	World Championships in Munich, West Germany, sprint for amateurs – 1st
1979	Pospíšil brothers^{×}	Cycle ball	World Indoor Cycling Championships in Schiltigheim, France – 1st
1980	Ota Zaremba^{×}	Weightlifting	1980 Summer Olympics in Moscow, Soviet Union, 100 kg weight class – 1st
1981	Jarmila Kratochvílová^{+}	Athletics – track disciplines	European Indoor Championships in Grenoble, France, 400 m – 1st
1982	Imrich Bugár^{×}	Discus throw	European Athletics Championships in Athens, Greece – 1st
1983	Jarmila Kratochvílová^{+}	Athletics – track disciplines	World Championships in Helsinki, Finland, 400 m – 1st (world record of 47.99), 800 m – 1st, 4 × 400 m relay – 2nd European Indoor Championships in Budapest, Hungary, 400 m – 1st 800m world record of 1:53.28 in Munich, West Germany
1984	Květa Jeriová^{+}	Cross-country skiing	Winter Olympics in Sarajevo, Yugoslavia, 5 km – 3rd, 4 x 5 km relay – 2nd
1985	Petr Jirmus^{×}	Aerobatics	European Championships – 1st
1986	Jozef Pribilinec^{×}	Racewalking	European Championships in Stuttgart, West Germany – 1st
1987	Jiří Parma^{×}	Ski jumping	World Championships in Oberstdorf, West Germany – 1st
1988	Jozef Pribilinec^{×}	Racewalking	Summer Olympics in Seoul, South Korea – 1st
1989	Attila Szabó^{×}	K-1 canoe sprint	World Championships in Plovdiv, Bulgaria, K-1 10000 m – 1st
1990	Jozef Lohyňa^{×}	Freestyle wrestling	World Championships in Tokyo, Japan, 82 kg weight class – 1st
1991	Radomír Šimůnek^{×}	Cyclo-cross	World Championships in Gieten, Netherlands – 1st
1992	Robert Změlík^{×}	Decathlon	Summer Olympics in Barcelona, Spain – 1st

== Team awards ==
Year	Team	Achievements in the given year
1961	Men's national ice hockey team^{×}	World Championships in Geneva and Lausanne, Switzerland – 2nd
1962	Men's national football team^{×}	World Cup in Chile – 2nd
1963	Dukla Prague men's handball team^{×}	European Champions Cup – 1st
1964	Men's national volleyball team^{×}	Summer Olympics in Tokyo, Japan – 3rd
1965	Men's national ice hockey team^{×}	World Championships in Tampere, Finland – 2nd
1966	Men's national volleyball team^{×}	World Championships in Prague, Czechoslovakia – 1st
1967	Men's national handball team^{×}	World Championships in Sweden – 1st
1968	Men's national ice hockey team^{×}	Winter Olympics in Grenoble, France – 2nd
1969	Men's national ice hockey team^{×}	World Championships in Stockholm, Sweden – 3rd
1970	not awarded	
1971	not awarded	
1972	not awarded	
1973	not awarded	
1974	not awarded	
1975	not awarded	
1976	not awarded	
1977	not awarded	
1978	National motorcycle team^{×}	International Six Days Enduro in Värnamo, Sweden – 1st
1979	not awarded	
1980	Men's national football team^{×}	Summer Olympics in Moscow, Soviet Union – 1st
1981	Men's national road cycling team^{×}	World Championships in Prague, Czechoslovakia, team time trial – 3rd
1982	National motorcycle team^{×}	International Six Days Enduro in Považská Bystrica, Czechoslovakia – 1st
1983	Women's national tennis team^{+}	Fed Cup – 1st
1984	Women's national ski-relay team^{+}	Winter Olympics in Sarajevo, Yugoslavia – 2nd
1985	Men's national ice hockey team^{×}	1985 World Ice Hockey Championships in Prague, Czechoslovakia – 1st
1986	Men's national track cycling team^{×}	World Championships in Colorado Springs, United States, 4000 m team pursuit – 1st
1987	Women's national volleyball team^{+}	European Championships in Belgium – 3rd
1988	Men's national ski-relay team^{×}	Winter Olympics in Calgary, Canada – 3rd
1989	Men's national ski-relay team^{×}	World Championships in Lahti, Finland – 3rd
1990	Men's national football team^{×}	World Cup in Italy – quarterfinals
1991	Men's national table-tennis team^{×}	World Championships in Chiba, Japan – 3rd
1992	Men's national ice hockey team^{×}	Winter Olympics in Albertville, France – 3rd World Championships in Czechoslovakia – 3rd

== See also ==
- Sportsperson of the Year (Czech Republic)
- Sportsperson of the Year (Slovakia)
