= 2021 World Athletics U20 Championships – Men's decathlon =

Men's decathlon at the 2021 World Athletics U20 Championships
- Venue: Kasarani Stadium
- Dates: 20–21 August
- Competitors: 8 from 6 nations
- Winning points: 8169

Medalists
gold medal	František Doubek	Czech Republic
silver medal	Jente Hauttekeete	Belgium
bronze medal	José San Pastor	Spain

The men's decathlon at the 2021 World Athletics U20 Championships was held at the Kasarani Stadium on 20 and 21 August.

== Records ==
Standing records prior to the 2021 World Athletics U20 Championships
World U20 Record	Niklas Kaul (GER)	8435	Grosseto, Italy	23 July 2017
Championship Record	Ashley Moloney (AUS)	8190	Tampere, Finland	11 July 2018
World U20 Leading	Jente Hauttekeete (BEL)	8150	Tallinn, Estonia	18 July 2021

== Results ==
The highest mark recorded in each event is highlighted in yellow

Rank	Athlete	Nationality	100m	LJ	SP	HJ	400m	110m H	DT	PV	JT	1500m	Points	Notes
1st place, gold medalist(s)	František Doubek	Czech Republic	10.93	7.19	14.96	1.97 PB	48.72 PB	14.10 SB	45.74 PB	4.80 PB	64.03 PB	4:52.39	8169	WU20L
2nd place, silver medalist(s)	Jente Hauttekeete	Belgium	10.89	7.44	15.61	2.09	48.99 PB	13.95 PB	41.47	4.50	51.24	4:48.18	8053	
3rd place, bronze medalist(s)	José San Pastor	Spain	11.32	6.96	15.97	1.85 PB	50.48 PB	14.51 PB	45.64	4.30	51.16	5:06.13	7430	NU20R
4	Ville Toivonen	Finland	11.45	7.08	13.56	1.85	52.13 PB	14.44 PB	41.17	4.00	66.25 SB	5:04.56	7275	
5	Aleksi Savolainen	Finland	11.22 PB	7.04 PB	13.91	1.88	50.95	14.72 PB	38.39 PB	4.40	49.36	5:04.91	7183	
6	Jef Misplon	Belgium	11.76	6.19	14.19	1.85	51.93	14.76	38.31	4.40	45.79	4:46.33	6873	
7	Alessandro Sion	Italy	11.41	6.94	12.85	1.94	52.04	14.59	38.71	NM	59.38	5:06.14	6492	
8	Nikolaj Grønbech	Denmark	11.36 SB	6.77	13.68	1.88	50.84 PB	DQ	36.97	5.00 PB	59.25 PB	5:06.03	6489	
