= Moldovan Sportsman of the year =

Moldovan sports award (2005-)

The Moldovan Sportspersonality of the Year is chosen annually since 2005 by the national Ministry of Youth and Sports. In addition, the best female athlete is nominated each year and the best trainer.

== Winners ==
Year	Winner	Sport
2005	Alexandru Bratan	Weightlifting
2006	?	?
2007	Igor Bour	Weightlifting
2008	Veaceslav Gojan	Boxing
2009	Igor Grabucea	Weightlifting
2010	Andrei Perpeliţă	Freestyle wrestling
2011	Sergiu Toma	Judo
2012	Cristina Iovu	Weightlifting
2013	Oleg Sîrghi	Weightlifting
2014	Mihai Sava	Freestyle wrestling
2015	Serghei Tarnovschi	Canoe sprint
2016	Zalina Petrivskaya	Hammer throw
2017	Aaron Cook	Taekwondo
2018	Victor Ciobanu	Greco-Roman
2019	Denis Vieru	Judoka
2020	Anastasia Nichita	Amateur wrestling
2021	Irina Rângaci (Female wrestling) / Serghei Tarnovschi (Canoe sprint)	
2022	Anastasia Nichita (Amateur wrestling) / Serghei Tarnovschi (Canoe sprint)	
2023	Anastasia Nichita (Amateur wrestling) / Serghei Tarnovschi (Canoe sprint)	
