= Sportsperson of the Year (Czech Republic) =

Czech sports award (1993-)

Sportsperson of the Year (Czech: Sportovec roku) is an award given by the Sport Journalists' Club (Klub sportovních novinářů, KSN) to the best Sportsperson and the best Sport Team of the given year in the Czech Republic. For the first time it was awarded after the dissolution of Czechoslovakia in 1993, following the previous trophy Sportsperson of the Year of Czechoslovakia. Since 2000, the KSN has voted also for a Sport Legend. This award has been called The Emil Zátopek Award since 2001, after the first chosen legend, runner Emil Zátopek. Since 2002, Czech Foundation of the Sport Representation in cooperation with the KSN awards also the best Czech Junior Sportsperson of the Year.

== Sportsperson of the Year ==
SPORTSPERSON OF THE YEAR
Year	Individual	Team
1993	Jan Železný (athletics – javelin throw)	Czechoslovak national ski jumping team
1994	Dominik Hašek (ice hockey)	Czech Republic national shooting team
1995	Jan Železný (athletics – javelin throw)	Czech Republic national football team
1996	Martin Doktor (canoe racing)	Czech Republic national football team
1997	Tomáš Dvořák (athletics – decathlon)	Czech Republic ice hockey team
1998	Dominik Hašek (ice hockey)	Czech Republic ice hockey team
1999	Tomáš Dvořák (athletics – decathlon)	Czech Republic national football team
2000	Jan Železný (athletics – javelin throw)	Czech Republic ice hockey team
2001	Jan Železný (athletics – javelin throw)	Czech Republic ice hockey team
2002	Aleš Valenta (freestyle skiing)	Czech Republic national under-21 football team
2003	Pavel Nedvěd (association football)	Czech Republic national football team
2004	Roman Šebrle (athletics – decathlon)	Czech Republic national football team
2005	Jaromír Jágr (ice hockey)	Czech Republic ice hockey team
2006	Kateřina Neumannová (cross-country skiing)	Czech Republic ice hockey team
2007	Martina Sáblíková (speed skating)	Czech Republic national under-20 football team
2008	Barbora Špotáková (athletics – javelin throw)	Slavia Prague football club
2009	Martina Sáblíková (speed skating)	Czech Republic Davis Cup team
2010	Martina Sáblíková (speed skating)	Czech Republic ice hockey team
2011	Petra Kvitová (tennis)	Czech Republic Fed Cup team
2012	Barbora Špotáková (athletics – javelin throw)	Czech Republic Davis Cup team
2013	Zuzana Hejnová (athletics – 400 metres hurdles)	Czech Republic Davis Cup team
2014	Petra Kvitová (tennis)	Czech Republic Fed Cup team
2015	Zuzana Hejnová (athletics – 400 metres hurdles)	Czech Republic Fed Cup team
2016	Lukáš Krpálek (judo)	Czech Republic Fed Cup team
2017	Gabriela Soukalová (biathlon)	Czech Republic national minifootball team
2018	Ester Ledecká (snowboarding, alpine skiing)	Czech Republic Fed Cup team
2019	Lukáš Krpálek (judo)	Czech Republic national basketball team
2020	David Pastrňák (ice hockey)	Czech Republic national biathlon team
2021	Lukáš Krpálek (judo)	Czech Republic national basketball team
2022	Ester Ledecká (snowboarding, alpine skiing)	Czech Republic ice hockey team
2023	Markéta Vondroušová (tennis)	Czech Republic national under-20 ice hockey team
2024	Josef Dostál (sprint kayak)	Czech Republic ice hockey team
2025	Ester Ledecká (snowboarding, alpine skiing)	Czech Republic volleyball team

== Junior Sportsperson of the Year ==
JUNIOR SPORTSPERSON OF THE YEAR
Year	Sportsperson
2002	Hana Pešková (whitewater slalom)
2003	Zuzana Kocumová (cross-country skiing)
2004	Lenka Hyková (shooting sports)
2005	Šárka Záhrobská (alpine skiing)
2006	Martina Sáblíková (speed skating)
2007	Ondřej Polívka (modern pentathlon)
2008	Lukáš Krpálek (judo)
2009	Ondřej Polívka (modern pentathlon)
2010	Tomáš Paprstka (cyclo-cross)
2011	Karolína Erbanová (speed skating)
2012	Karolína Erbanová (speed skating)
2013	Ester Ledecká (snowboarding)
2014	Anežka Drahotová (athletics – racewalking)
2015	Ester Ledecká (snowboarding); Jiří Janošek (track cycling)
2016	Michaela Hrubá (athletics – high jump)
2017	Michaela Hrubá (athletics – high jump); Filip Nepejchal (sports shooting)
2018	Barbora Seemanová (swimming)
2019	Jonáš Forejtek (tennis)
2020	not awarded
2021	František Doubek (athletics – decathlon)
2022	Daniel Gracík (swimming)
2023	Barbora Galušková (whitewater slalom)
2024	Lurdes Gloria Manuel (athletics – sprint)
2025	Metoděj Jílek (speed skating)

== The Emil Zátopek Award (Sport Legend) ==
SPORT LEGEND
Year	Sportsperson
2000	Emil Zátopek (athletics – long-distance track)
2001	Věra Čáslavská (artistic gymnastics)
2002	Jiří Raška (ski jumping)
2003	Dana Zátopková (athletics – javelin throw)
2004	Ivan Hlinka (ice hockey)
2005	Josef Masopust (football)
2006	Martina Navratilova (tennis)
2007	1947 Czechoslovakia national ice-hockey team
2008	Jan Železný (athletics – javelin throw)
2009	Alena Vrzáňová (figure skating)
2010	Eva Bosáková (artistic gymnastics)
2011	Jan Kodeš (tennis)
2012	1962 Czechoslovakia national football team
2013	Jarmila Kratochvílová (athletics – 400 metres)
2014	Miloslava Rezková (athletics – high jump)
2015	Jaroslav Holík (ice hockey); Jiří Holík (ice hockey)
2016	Alois Hudec (artistic gymnastics)
2017	1967 Czechoslovakia national handball team
2018	Jana Novotná (tennis)
2019	Jiří Daler (cycling)
2020	Antonín Panenka (football)
2021	Vítězslav Mácha (greco-Roman wrestling)
2022	Květoslav Mašita (motorcycle racing)
2023	Bedřich Šupčík (gymnastics)
2024	Milena Duchková–Neveklovská (diving)
2025	Imrich Bugár (discus throw); Helena Fibingerová (shot put)

== See also ==
- Sportsperson of the Year (Czechoslovakia)
