= Sportsperson of the Year (Slovakia) =

Sports award (1993-)

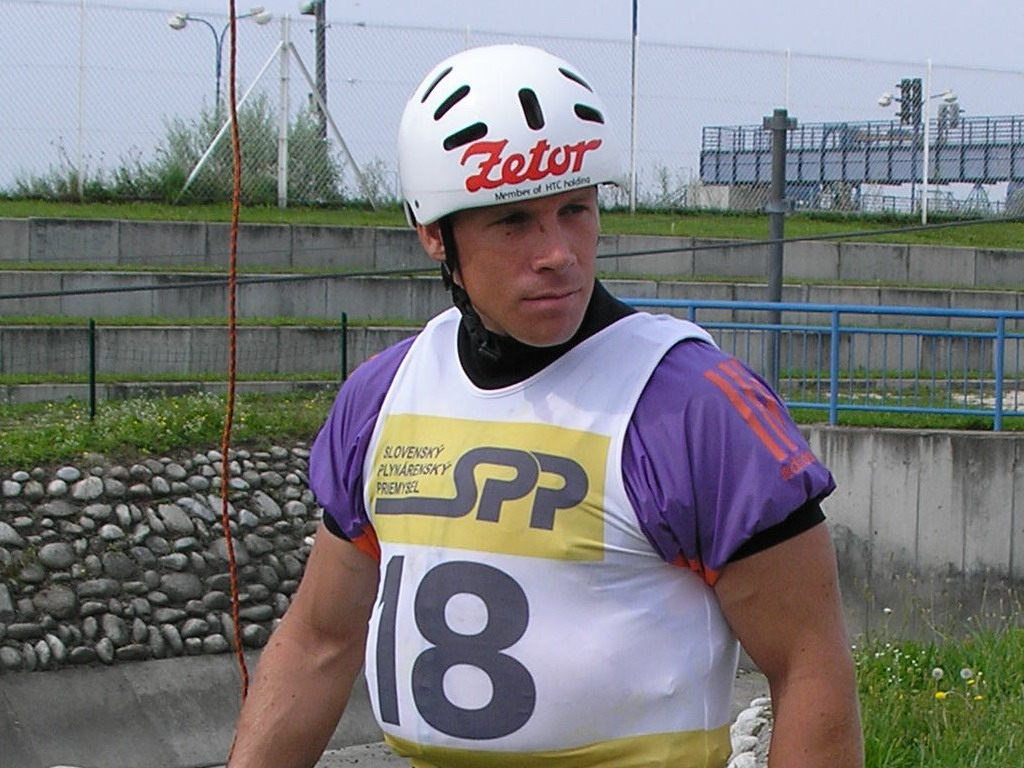
Michal Martikán, quadruple winner of the award

Sportsperson of the Year (Slovak: Športovec roka) is a trophy awarded to the best Slovak athletes by the Club of Sports Journalists of the Slovak Syndicate of Journalists. The trophy was founded in 1993, following the annual award Czechoslovak Sportsperson of the Year, which was finished after the dissolution of Czechoslovakia.

So far the individual trophy has been awarded to 18 different athletes, among which there were 11 men and 7 women (as of 2025). The most successful athletes were Martina Moravcová (swimmer), who achieved it 6 times, Michal Martikán (slalom canoeist), who won it 4 times, and Petra Vlhová (alpine skier), who also won it 4 times. The team trophy has been achieved by teams of 10 different sports disciplines (as of 2025). The most successful were K4 kayakers, who received it 8 times, ice hockey players, who won it 6 times, and football players, who also won it 6 times.

== Individual awards ==
Sportsmen Sportswomen

Year	Name	Sport
1993	Martina Moravcová	Swimming
1994	Milan Dvorščík	Cycling
1995	Martina Moravcová	Swimming
1996	Michal Martikán	C1 Canoe slalom
1997	Michal Martikán	C1 Canoe slalom
1998	Martina Moravcová	Swimming
1999	Jozef Gönci	Shooting
2000	Martina Moravcová	Swimming
2001	Martina Moravcová	Swimming
2002	Peter Bondra	Ice hockey
2003	Martina Moravcová	Swimming
2004	Elena Kaliská	K1 Canoe slalom
2005	Dominik Hrbatý	Tennis
2006	Radoslav Židek	Snowboarding
2007	Michal Martikán	C1 Canoe slalom
2008	Michal Martikán	C1 Canoe slalom
2009	Peter Hochschorner; Pavol Hochschorner	C2 Canoe slalom
2010	Anastasiya Kuzmina	Biathlon
2011	Peter Hochschorner; Pavol Hochschorner	C2 Canoe slalom
2012	Zuzana Štefečeková	Shooting
2013	Peter Sagan	Cycling
2014	Anastasiya Kuzmina	Biathlon
2015	Peter Sagan	Cycling
2016	Matej Tóth	Athletics – 50 kilometres race walk
2017	Peter Sagan	Cycling
2018	Anastasiya Kuzmina	Biathlon
2019	Petra Vlhová	Alpine skiing
2020	Petra Vlhová	Alpine skiing
2021	Petra Vlhová	Alpine skiing
2022	Petra Vlhová	Alpine skiing
2023	Danka Barteková	Skeet shooting
2024	Matej Beňuš	C1 Canoe slalom
2025	Emma Zapletalová	Athletics – 400 metres hurdles

== Team awards ==
Year	Team
1993	Slovakia women's national basketball team
1994	Slovakia men's national ice hockey team
1995	Slovakia men's national ice hockey team
1996	SCP Ružomberok women's basketball team
1997	Slovakia women's national basketball team
1998	Slovakia women's national biathlon relay team
1999	SCP Ružomberok women's basketball team
2000	Slovakia men's national ice hockey team
2001	K4 Slovakia men's kayaking team
2002	Slovakia men's national ice hockey team
2003	K4 Slovakia men's kayaking team
2004	K4 Slovakia men's kayaking team
2005	Slovakia Davis Cup tennis team
2006	K4 Slovakia men's kayaking team
2007	K4 Slovakia men's kayaking team
2008	K4 Slovakia men's kayaking team
2009	Slovakia men's national football team
2010	Slovakia men's national football team
2011	Slovakia men's national volleyball team
2012	Slovakia men's national ice hockey team
2013	Good Angels Košice women's basketball team
2014	Slovakia men's national football team
2015	Slovakia men's national football team
2016	K4 Slovakia men's kayaking team
2017	Slovakia mixed alpine skiing team
2018	Slovakia women's national biathlon relay team
2019	Slovakia men's canoe slalom team
2020	Slovakia men's national football team
2021	K4 Slovakia men's kayaking team
2022	Slovakia men's national ice hockey team
2023	Slovakia men's national football team
2024	Slovakia Billie Jean King Cup team
2025	Slovakia women's national under-17 handball team

== See also ==
- Sportsperson of the Year (Czechoslovakia)
