= Vanuatu Sports Awards =

Annual sporting awards in Vanuatu

Vanuatu Sports Awards is the yearly award ceremony to honour the best athletes of the calendar year in Vanuatu. It was established in 2019 by the Vanuatu Association of Sports and National Olympic Committee.

== History ==
The idea of the Vanuatu Sports Awards was first reported on 7 February 2019. The winners of the award were announced on 30 April 2019.

== Award winners ==
	2019
Sportsman of the Year	Rio Rii (Rowing)
Sportswoman of the Year	Anolyn Lulu (Table Tennis)
Men's Team of the Year	Vanuatu national cricket team
Women's Team of the Year	Vanuatu Beach Volleyball Team
Coach of the Year	Sacha Duthu (Vanuatu National Basketball Team)
Vanuatu Sports Hall of Fame Inductees	Seru Korikalo (Former Athlete, General Secretary of VASANOC), Mary-Estelle Mahuk (Olympian athlete)
