= 1961 Ice Hockey World Championships =

1961 edition of the IIHF World Ice Hockey Championship

Tournament details
- Host country: Switzerland
- Dates: 1–12 March
- Teams: 8

Final positions
- Champions: Canada (19th title)
- Runners-up: Czechoslovakia
- Third place: Soviet Union
- Fourth place: Sweden

Tournament statistics
- Games played: 28
- Goals scored: 236 (8.43 per game)
- Attendance: 141,300 (5,046 per game)
- Scoring leader: (Soviet Union) Boris Mayorov (17 points)

The 1961 Ice Hockey World Championships was the 28th edition of the Ice Hockey World Championships. The tournament was held in Geneva and Lausanne, Switzerland from 1 to 12 March 1961. The games were played outdoors on a frozen pool. A glare made it hard for players to see well, however photographers were able to get aerial pictures from the diving board. Canada, represented by the Trail Smoke Eaters, won their nineteenth international title. It would be 33 years before Canada won another World Championship. By beating out the Soviets for the Silver, the Czechoslovaks won their tenth European title. The final day was marred by political controversy when Willi Daume, president of West Germany hockey, forbade his team to take the ice against East Germany to avoid the possibility of honouring East Germany's new flag.

A record twenty nations participated in three groups, with South Africa appearing for the first time. Teams were divided into the three tiers, roughly following the 1959 championships, and using qualification games, to establish an eight-team group A, a six-team group B, and a six-team group C. The South African team did not have the minimum number of players so forty-five-year-old federation president Tom Durling played despite not actually being a citizen of the country. Promotion and relegation did not begin yet, but it was a big step towards formulating the process.

== Qualification matches for Group A and B ==
The nations who finished 1st through 6th in 1959 played in Group A. The nation ranked 7th played the hosts, and 8th played 9th to qualify the final two entries.

1 March	Switzerland	5–6 OT	West Germany

1 March	East Germany	6–1	Norway

== World Championship Group A (Switzerland) ==
=== Final Round ===
Pos	Team	Pld	W	D	L	GF	GA	GD	Pts
1	Canada	7	6	1	0	45	11	+34	13
2	Czechoslovakia	7	6	1	0	33	9	+24	13
3	Soviet Union	7	5	0	2	51	20	+31	10
4	Sweden	7	4	0	3	33	27	+6	8
5	East Germany	7	2	0	5	21	33	−12	4
6	United States	7	1	1	5	24	43	−19	3
7	Finland	7	1	1	5	19	43	−24	3
8	West Germany	7	0	2	5	10	50	−40	2

2 March	Canada	6–1	Sweden

2 March	Czechoslovakia	6–0	Finland

2 March	Soviet Union	13–2	United States

4 March	Czechoslovakia	4–1	United States

4 March	Finland	6–4	East Germany

4 March	Canada	9–1	West Germany

4 March	Soviet Union	6–2	Sweden

5 March	Canada	7–4	United States

5 March	Czechoslovakia	6–0	West Germany

5 March	Sweden	3–2	East Germany

5 March	Soviet Union	7–3	Finland

7 March	Sweden	6–4	Finland

7 March	Czechoslovakia	6–4	Soviet Union

7 March	United States	4–4	West Germany

7 March	Canada	5–2	East Germany

8 March	Sweden	12–1	West Germany

8 March	East Germany	6–5	United States

9 March	Soviet Union	9–1	East Germany

9 March	Finland	3–3	West Germany

9 March	Canada	1–1	Czechoslovakia

11 March	Czechoslovakia	5–1	East Germany

11 March	Sweden	7–3	United States

11 March	Soviet Union	11–1	West Germany

11 March	Canada	12–1	Finland

12 March	Canada	5–1	Soviet Union

12 March	Czechoslovakia	5–2	Sweden

12 March	United States	5–2	Finland

12 March	East Germany	5–0	West Germany

== Qualification matches for Group B and C ==
The losers of the Group A qualifiers (Switzerland and Norway), were joined by the nations who finished 10th and 11th (Italy and Poland) in 1959. Remaining countries that wished to play at this level played qualification games.

2 March	Austria	6–5	Romania

2 March	Great Britain	18–1	Belgium

== World Championship Group B (Switzerland) ==
=== Final Round ===
Pos	Team	Pld	W	D	L	GF	GA	GD	Pts
9	Norway	5	4	0	1	27	9	+18	8
10	Great Britain	5	3	2	0	21	11	+10	8
11	Switzerland	5	2	1	2	17	15	+2	5
12	Italy	5	2	1	2	19	20	−1	5
13	Poland	5	1	0	4	13	17	−4	2
14	Austria	5	1	0	4	10	35	−25	2

3 March	Switzerland	0–6	Norway

3 March	Great Britain	10–2	Austria

3 March	Italy	5–3	Poland

5 March	Italy	7–2	Austria

6 March	Norway	5–3	Poland

6 March	Italy	3–3	Great Britain

6 March	Switzerland	9–1	Austria

7 March	Switzerland	1–3	Poland

9 March	Great Britain	3–2	Poland

9 March	Norway	7–2	Austria

10 March	Austria	3–2	Poland

10 March	Norway	7–1	Italy

10 March	Switzerland	2–2	Great Britain

11 March	Switzerland	5–3	Italy

12 March	Great Britain	3–2	Norway

== World Championship Group C (Switzerland) ==
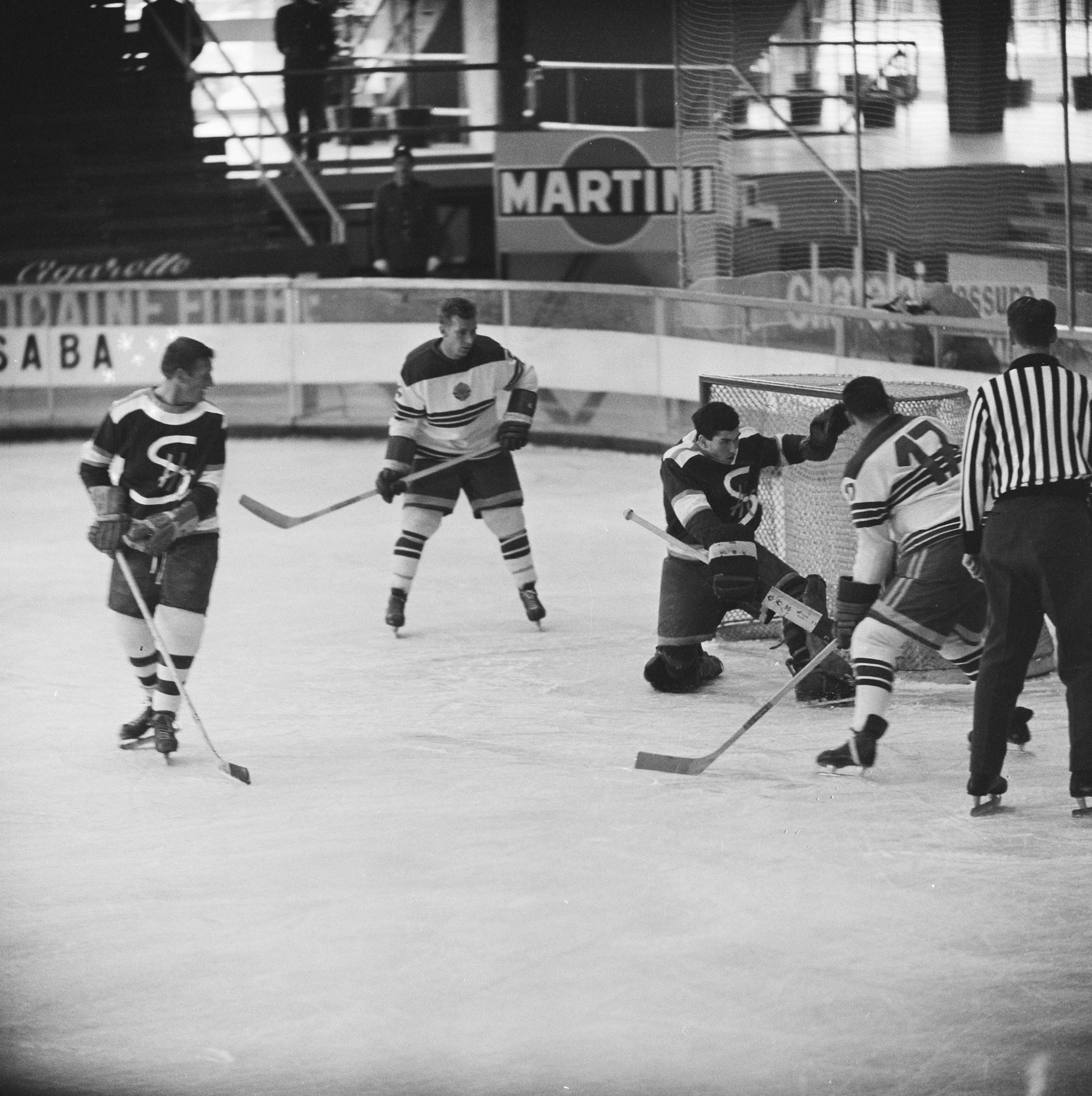
Nederlands vs Yugoslavia match. Yugoslavia won 9–2.

=== Final Round ===
Pos	Team	Pld	W	D	L	GF	GA	GD	Pts
15	Romania	5	5	0	0	69	5	+64	10
16	France	5	4	0	1	34	16	+18	8
17	Yugoslavia	5	3	0	2	34	22	+12	6
18	Netherlands	5	2	0	3	18	36	−18	4
19	South Africa	5	1	0	4	18	47	−29	2
20	Belgium	5	0	0	5	9	56	−47	0

3 March	France	7–3	Netherlands

3 March	Romania	22–1	Belgium

3 March	Yugoslavia	12–3	South Africa

4 March	Yugoslavia	9–2	Netherlands

5 March	Romania	14–0	South Africa

6 March	Netherlands	8–4	South Africa

6 March	France	10–0	Belgium

6 March	Romania	12–1	Yugoslavia

7 March	France	11–2	South Africa

8 March	Yugoslavia	10–2	Belgium

8 March	Romania	12–0	Netherlands

9 March	France	3–2	Yugoslavia

10 March	Romania	9–3	France

10 March	Netherlands	5–4	Belgium

11 March	South Africa	9–2	Belgium

== Ranking and statistics ==
1961 IIHF World Championship winners

Canada

=== Tournament Awards ===
- Best players selected by the directorate:
  - Best Goaltender: (Canada) Seth Martin
  - Best Defenceman: (Soviet Union) Ivan Tregubov
  - Best Forward: (Czechoslovakia) Vlastimil Bubník
- Media All-Star Team:
  - Goaltender: (Canada) Seth Martin
  - Defence: (Canada) Darryl Sly, (Canada) Harry Smith
  - Forwards: (Canada) Michel Legacé, (Soviet Union) Boris Mayorov, (Czechoslovakia) Miroslav Vlach

=== Final standings ===
The final standings of the tournament according to IIHF:

1st place, gold medalist(s)	Canada
2nd place, silver medalist(s)	Czechoslovakia
3rd place, bronze medalist(s)	Soviet Union
4	Sweden
5	East Germany
6	United States
7	Finland
8	West Germany

=== European championships final standings ===
The final standings of the European championships according to IIHF:

Gold medal	Czechoslovakia
Silver medal	Soviet Union
Bronze medal	Sweden
4	East Germany
5	Finland
6	West Germany
