= Ab (given name) =

Ab is a Dutch and English (primarily Canadian) masculine given name. It usually is short form (hypocorism) of Albert and occasionally of Abraham or Abbott. The following people have a full name "Albert(us)", except where noted:

- Ab Baars (born 1955), Dutch jazz saxophonist and clarinetist
- Ab van Bemmel (1912–1986), Dutch boxer
- Ab Box (1909–2000), Canadian football player
- Ab Campbell (1910–1973), Canadian (Toronto) politician
- Ab Conway (1914–2001), Canadian middle-distance runner
- Ab DeMarco (1916–1989), Canadian ice hockey player
- Ab DeMarco, Jr. (born 1949), Canadian ice hockey player
- Ab Doderer (1926–?), Dutch chauffeur and kidnapping victim
- Ab Douglas (born 1950), Dutch sports sailor
- Ab van Egmond (born 1938), Dutch road cyclist
- Ab Ekels (born 1950), Dutch sports sailor
- Ab Fafié (1941–2012), Dutch footballer
- Ab Geldermans (1935–2025), Dutch road bicycle racer and directeur sportif
- Ab Gowanlock (1900–1988), Canadian curler
- Ab Gritter (1949–2008), Dutch footballer
- Ab Hardy (1910–?), Canadian speed skater
- Ab Harrewijn (1954–2002), Dutch GreenLeft politician
- Ab Heijn (1927–2011), Dutch entrepreneur, chairman of Ahold
- Ab Hoffman (born 1947), Canadian track and field athlete Abby Hoffman
- Ab Jenkins (1883–1946), American race car driver and mayor of Salt Lake City (Abbott)
- Ab Justice, American golfer
- Ab Klink (born 1958), Dutch CDA politician (Abraham)
- Ab McDonald (1936–2018), Canadian ice hockey player (Alvin Brian)
- Ab Newsome (1920–1979), Canadian ice hockey player
- Ab Nicholas (1931–2016), American chief executive
- Ab Osterhaus (born 1948), Dutch virologist
- Ab Rector (1934–2005), Canadian (New Brunswick) politician
- Ab Renaud (1920–2012), Canadian ice hockey player
- Ab Rogers (1909–?), Canadian ice hockey player
- Ab Rosbag (born 1940), Dutch wrestler
- Ab Salm (1801–1876), Dutch painter
- Ab Saunders (1851–1883), American cowboy and gunman
- Ab Sluis (born 1937), Dutch cyclist
- Ab Tamboer (1950–2016), Dutch drummer
- Ab Tresling (1909–1980), Dutch field hockey player
- Ab Walker (1910–2001), Canadian (Ontario) politician
- Ab Welsh (1913–1971), Canadian ice hockey player
- Ab Wolders (born 1951), Dutch strongman and powerlifter
- Ab Wright (1905–1995), American baseball and football player

Bardic names may start with "Ab":

- Ab Iolo (1787–1847), Welsh poet and author Taliesin Williams
- Ab Ithel (1811–1862), Welsh antiquary and Anglican priest John Williams

== See also ==
- AB (disambiguation)
