= A/B =

A/B may refer to:

- A/B (album), an album by Kaleo
- A/B testing, a type of randomized experiment
- A/B Sound System, a type of public address system
- "A/B", a song by Pond from their 2017 album, The Weather
- a/b: Auto/Biography Studies, academic journal

== See also ==
- AB (disambiguation)
