= Tom Dewar =

Canadian ice hockey player

- Born: June 10, 1913; Frobisher, Saskatchewan, Canada
- Died: July 23, 1982 (aged 69); Calgary, Alberta, Canada
- Height: 5 ft 9 in (175 cm)
- Weight: 170 lb (77 kg; 12 st 2 lb)
- Position: Defence
- Shot: Left
- Played for: New York Rangers; Earls Court Rangers
- National team: Canada
- Playing career: 1934–1944

Medal record

Representing Canada

World Championships
Gold medal – first place	1934 Italy	

Thomas "Moose" Dewar (June 10, 1913 – July 23, 1982) was a Canadian ice hockey defenceman. He played 9 games in the National Hockey League (NHL) for the New York Rangers during the 1943–44 season. The rest of his career, which lasted from 1934 to 1944, was spent in the minor leagues.

Dewar was a member of the Saskatoon Quakers who represented Canada at the 1934 World Championships held in Milan, Italy where they won gold.

== Career statistics ==
=== Regular season and playoffs ===
			Regular season					Playoffs
Season	Team	League	GP	G	A	Pts	PIM	GP	G	A	Pts	PIM
1929–30	Moose Jaw Cubs	S-SJHL	—	—	—	—	—	—	—	—	—	—
1929–30	Moose Jaw Cubs	M-Cup	—	—	—	—	—	2	1	0	1	0
1930–31	Moose Jaw Cubs	S-SJHL	—	—	—	—	—	—	—	—	—	—
1931–32	Moose Jaw Cubs	S-SJHL	—	—	—	—	—	—	—	—	—	—
1931–32	Moose Jaw Cubs	M-Cup	—	—	—	—	—	4	4	2	6	8
1932–33	Moose Jaw Cubs	S-SJHL	—	—	—	—	—	—	—	—	—	—
1932–33	Moose Jaw Cubs	M-Cup	—	—	—	—	—	2	0	0	0	0
1933–34	Moose Jaw Cubs	S-SJHL	1	0	0	0	0	—	—	—	—	—
1933–34	BKE Budapest	HUN	—	—	—	—	—	—	—	—	—	—
1934–35	Saskatoon Standards	N-SSHL	24	4	6	10	20	2	0	0	0	4
1935–36	Prince Albert Mintos	N-SSHL	20	13	6	19	12	3	0	0	0	8
1935–36	Prince Albert Mintos	Al-Cup	—	—	—	—	—	7	2	0	2	—
1936–37	Earls Court Rangers	ENL	—	8	8	16	60	—	—	—	—	—
1937–38	Moose Jaw Millers	S-SSHL	24	4	4	8	18	6	1	1	2	6
1937–38	Moose Jaw Canucks	Al-Cup	—	—	—	—	—	4	1	0	1	4
1938–39	Moose Jaw Millers	SSHL	30	8	5	13	18	8	0	0	0	0
1939–40	Calgary Stampeders	ASHL	32	6	11	17	6	8	2	1	3	2
1940–41	Calgary Stampeders	ASHL	30	8	4	12	10	8	2	0	2	2
1941–42	Calgary Stampeders	ABCSL	29	2	6	8	4	6	0	2	2	8
1942–43	Calgary Buffaloes	AIHA	29	6	5	11	8	—	—	—	—	—
1943–44	New York Rangers	NHL	9	0	2	2	4	—	—	—	—	—
1943–44	Brooklyn Crescents	EAHL	2	1	0	1	0	—	—	—	—	—
NHL totals			9	0	2	2	4	—	—	—	—	—

=== International ===
Year	Team	Event	GP	G	A	Pts	PIM
1934	Canada	WC	—	—	—	—	—
Senior totals			—	—	—	—	—

== See also ==
- List of Canadian national ice hockey team rosters
