= Len Haley =

Canadian ice hockey player (1931–2024)

- Born: September 15, 1931 Edmonton, Alberta, Canada
- Died: July 24, 2024 (aged 92) Edmonton, Alberta, Canada
- Height: 5 ft 6 in (168 cm)
- Weight: 160 lb (73 kg; 11 st 6 lb)
- Position: Right wing
- Shot: Right
- Played for: Detroit Red Wings
- Playing career: 1951–1972

Leonard Frank "Comet" Haley (September 15, 1931 – July 24, 2024) was a Canadian ice hockey player who played 30 games in the National Hockey League with the Detroit Red Wings during the 1959–60 and 1960–61 seasons. The rest of his career, which lasted from 1951 to 1972, was mainly spent in the minor Western Hockey League. Haley died in Edmonton on July 24, 2024, at the age of 92.

== Career statistics ==
=== Regular season and playoffs ===
			Regular season					Playoffs
Season	Team	League	GP	G	A	Pts	PIM	GP	G	A	Pts	PIM
1947–48	Edmonton Canadians	EJrHL	1	0	0	0	0	—	—	—	—	—
1948–49	Wetaskiwin Canadians	EJrHL	—	—	—	—	—	—	—	—	—	—
1948–49	Wetaskiwin Canadians	M-Cup	—	—	—	—	—	3	1	0	1	6
1949–50	Medicine Hat Tigers	WCJHL	40	26	28	54	76	5	0	3	3	6
1949–50	Medicine Hat Tigers	M-Cup	—	—	—	—	—	12	7	11	18	52
1950–51	Medicine Hat Tigers	WCJHL	40	37	30	67	53	5	3	3	6	14
1950–51	Omaha Knights	USHL	3	1	3	4	0	—	—	—	—	—
1951–52	Glace Bay Miners	MMHL	86	44	58	102	71	5	2	1	3	4
1952–53	Edmonton Flyers	WHL	69	18	17	35	23	15	4	6	10	6
1953–54	Edmonton Flyers	WHL	70	17	25	42	40	13	3	4	7	18
1954–55	Edmonton Flyers	WHL	—	—	—	—	—	—	—	—	—	—
1954–55	Saskatoon Quakers	WHL	68	20	23	43	43	—	—	—	—	—
1955–56	Saskatoon Quakers	WHL	68	17	22	39	95	3	1	3	4	4
1956–57	Brandon Regals	WHL	69	21	33	54	77	9	5	2	7	4
1957–58	Hershey Bears	AHL	70	30	19	49	34	11	4	4	8	4
1958–59	Hershey Bears	AHL	59	17	11	28	38	11	1	0	1	20
1959–60	Detroit Red Wings	NHL	27	1	2	3	12	6	1	3	4	6
1959–60	Edmonton Flyers	WHL	39	19	16	35	35	—	—	—	—	—
1960–61	Detroit Red Wings	NHL	3	1	0	1	2	—	—	—	—	—
1960–61	Edmonton Flyers	WHL	66	15	30	45	36	—	—	—	—	—
1961–62	San Francisco Seals	WHL	66	20	30	50	56	2	0	0	0	2
1962–63	San Francisco Seals	WHL	70	36	24	60	76	17	8	6	14	23
1963–64	San Francisco Seals	WHL	70	35	33	68	112	11	4	10	14	14
1964–65	San Francisco Seals	WHL	70	26	46	72	113	—	—	—	—	—
1965–66	Seattle Totems	WHL	69	27	39	66	89	—	—	—	—	—
1966–67	San Diego Gulls	WHL	69	13	33	46	71	—	—	—	—	—
1967–68	Tulsa Oilers	CHL	70	34	46	80	67	11	6	9	15	15
1968–69	Omaha Knights	CHL	70	16	25	41	63	7	2	4	6	0
1968–69	Edmonton Monarchs	ASHL	2	0	2	2	0	—	—	—	—	—
1969–70	Grand Falls-Windsor Cataracts	NFSHL	12	7	11	18	52	—	—	—	—	—
1969–70	New Haven Blades	EHL	39	12	31	43	16	11	5	3	8	16
1970–71	Edmonton Monarchs	PrSHL	40	23	26	49	76	—	—	—	—	—
1971–72	Edmonton Monarchs	PrSHL	40	18	23	41	63	—	—	—	—	—
WHL totals			863	284	371	655	866	70	25	31	56	71
NHL totals			30	2	2	4	14	6	1	3	4	6
