= P. Gabrielle Foreman =

American literary historian

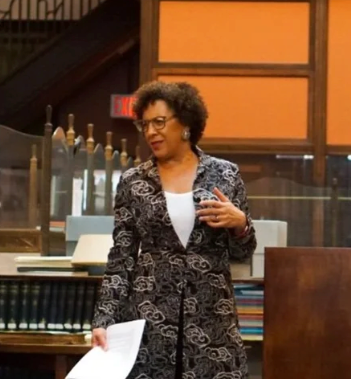
- Occupation: Historian
- Title: Paterno Family Professor of American Literature and Professor of African American Studies and History

Academic background
- Education: Amherst College (BA, 1986); University of California, Berkeley (PhD, 1992)
- Thesis: Sentimental subversions: Reading, race, and sexuality in the nineteenth century (1992)

Academic work
- Discipline: U.S. history
- Sub-discipline: 19th-century U.S. history
- Institutions: University of Delaware; Pennsylvania State University
- Website: pgabrielleforeman.com

Pier Gabrielle Foreman is an American literary historian. As of 2025, she is the Paterno Family Professor of American Literature and Professor of African American Studies and History at the Pennsylvania State University. Her research has focused on "race, reform and resistance" in the 19th-century United States.

Foreman was a 2022 MacArthur Fellow.

== Education and career ==
Foreman attended Amherst College (BA, in American Studies 1986) and obtained her PhD in Ethnic Studies in 1992 from the University of California, Berkeley.

Foreman taught at Wayne State University from 1992 to 1994, and at Occidental College from 1994 to 2010. She was the Ned B. Allen chair in English at the University of Delaware from 2010 to 2019. At the University of Delaware, Foreman was a founding faculty director of the Colored Conventions Project.

In 2022, Foreman was recognized as a MacArthur Fellow for "catalyzing inquiry into historic nineteenth-century collective Black organizing efforts through initiatives such as the Colored Conventions Project".

At the Pennsylvania State University, Foreman was a co-founder of the Center for Black Digital Research, also called #DigBlk. In 2024, she was elected to the American Academy of Arts and Sciences.

== Publications ==
=== Books ===
- Foreman, Pier Gabrielle (2009). Activist Sentiments: Reading Black Women in the Nineteenth Century. The new black studies series. Urbana Chicago: University of Illinois Press. ISBN 978-0-252-07664-0.
- Foreman, Pier Gabrielle; Casey, Jim; Patterson, Sarah Lynn, eds. (2021). The Colored Conventions Movement: Black organizing in the nineteenth century. The John Hope Franklin series in African American history and culture. Chapel Hill: University of North Carolina Press. ISBN 978-1-4696-5427-0.
- Praise Songs for Dave the Potter: Art and Poetry for David Drake (2023)

=== Chapters ===
- Foreman, P. Gabrielle (October 12, 1999). "7. Sentimental Abolition in Douglass's Decade: Revision, Erotic Conversion, and the Politics of Witnessing in The Heroic Slave and My Bondage and My Freedom". In Chapman, Mary; Hendler, Glenn (eds.). Sentimental Men: Masculinity and the Politics of Affect in American Culture. University of California Press. pp. 149–162. doi:10.1525/9780520921887-010. ISBN 978-0-520-92188-7.
- Senchyne, Jonathan; Fielder, Brigitte, eds. (2019). "Slavery, Black Visual Culture, and the Promises and Problems of Print in the Work of David Drake, Theaster Gates, and Glenn Ligon". Against a Sharp White Background: Infrastructures of African American Print. University of Wisconsin Press.
- Wallace, Maurice O.; Smith, Shawn Michelle, eds. (December 31, 2020). "Five. Who's Your Mama? "White" Mulatta Genealogies, Early Photography, and Anti- Passing Narratives of Slavery and Freedom". Pictures and Progress. Duke University Press. pp. 132–166. doi:10.1515/9780822394563-008. ISBN 978-0-8223-9456-3.
- Zamora, Lois Parkinson; Faris, Wendy B., eds. (December 31, 2020). "Past-On Stories: History and the Magically Real, Morrison and Allende on Call". Magical Realism. Duke University Press. pp. 285–304. doi:10.1515/9780822397212-017. ISBN 978-0-8223-9721-2.
- Foreman, P. Gabrielle (January 1, 2022). "What Is Missing?: Black History, Black Loss, and Black Resurrectionary Poetics". Race in American Literature and Culture. Cambridge University Press. pp. 397–409. ISBN 978-1-108-48739-9.

=== Articles ===
- Foreman, P. Gabrielle (1990). "Looking Back from Zora, or Talking Out Both Sides My Mouth for those Who Have Two Ears". Black American Literature Forum. 24 (4): 649–666. doi:10.2307/3041794. ISSN 0148-6179.
- Foreman, P. Gabrielle (1990). "The Spoken and The Silenced in Incidents in The Life of a Slave Girl and Our Nig". Callaloo. 13 (2): 313–324. doi:10.2307/2931709. ISSN 0161-2492.
- Foreman, P. Gabrielle (1993). ""This Promiscuous Housekeeping": Death, Transgression, and Homoeroticism in Uncle Tom's Cabin". Representations (43): 51–72. doi:10.2307/2928732. ISSN 0734-6018.
- Foreman, P. Gabrielle (September 1997). ""Reading Aright": White Slavery, Black Referents, and The Strategy of Histotextuality in Iola Leroy". The Yale Journal of Criticism. 10 (2): 327–354. doi:10.1353/yale.1997.0020. ISSN 1080-6636.
- Foreman, P. Gabrielle; Sherrard-Johnson, Cherene (2007). "Racial Recovery, Racial Death: An Introduction in Four Parts". Legacy. 24 (2): 157–170. ISSN 0748-4321.
- Foreman, P. Gabrielle (2007). "Reading/Photographs: Emma Dunham Kelley-Hawkins's Four Girls at Cottage City, Victoria Earle Matthews, and The Woman's Era". Legacy. 24 (2): 248–277. ISSN 0748-4321.
- Foreman, P. Gabrielle (2013). "A Riff, A Call, and A Response: Reframing the Problem That Led to Our Being Tokens in Ethnic and Gender Studies; or, Where Are We Going Anyway and with Whom Will We Travel?". Legacy. 30 (2): 306–322. doi:10.5250/legacy.30.2.0306. ISSN 0748-4321.
- Foreman, P. Gabrielle (May 2015). "New England's Fortune: An Inheritance of Black Bodies and Bones". Journal of American Studies. 49 (2): 287–303. doi:10.1017/S0021875815000080. ISSN 0021-8758.
- Foreman, P. Gabrielle (2017). "The "Christian Recorder", Broken Families, and Educated Nations in Julia C. Collins's Civil War Novel "The Curse of Caste"". African American Review. 50 (4): 1063–1074. ISSN 1062-4783.
- Foreman, P. Gabrielle (May 4, 2023). "Sankofa Imperatives: Black Women, Digital Methods, and the Archival Turn". a/b: Auto/Biography Studies. 38 (2): 423–435. doi:10.1080/08989575.2023.2221941. ISSN 0898-9575.
