= Saskatoon Arena =

Former indoor arena in Saskatoon, Saskatchewan

- The Barn
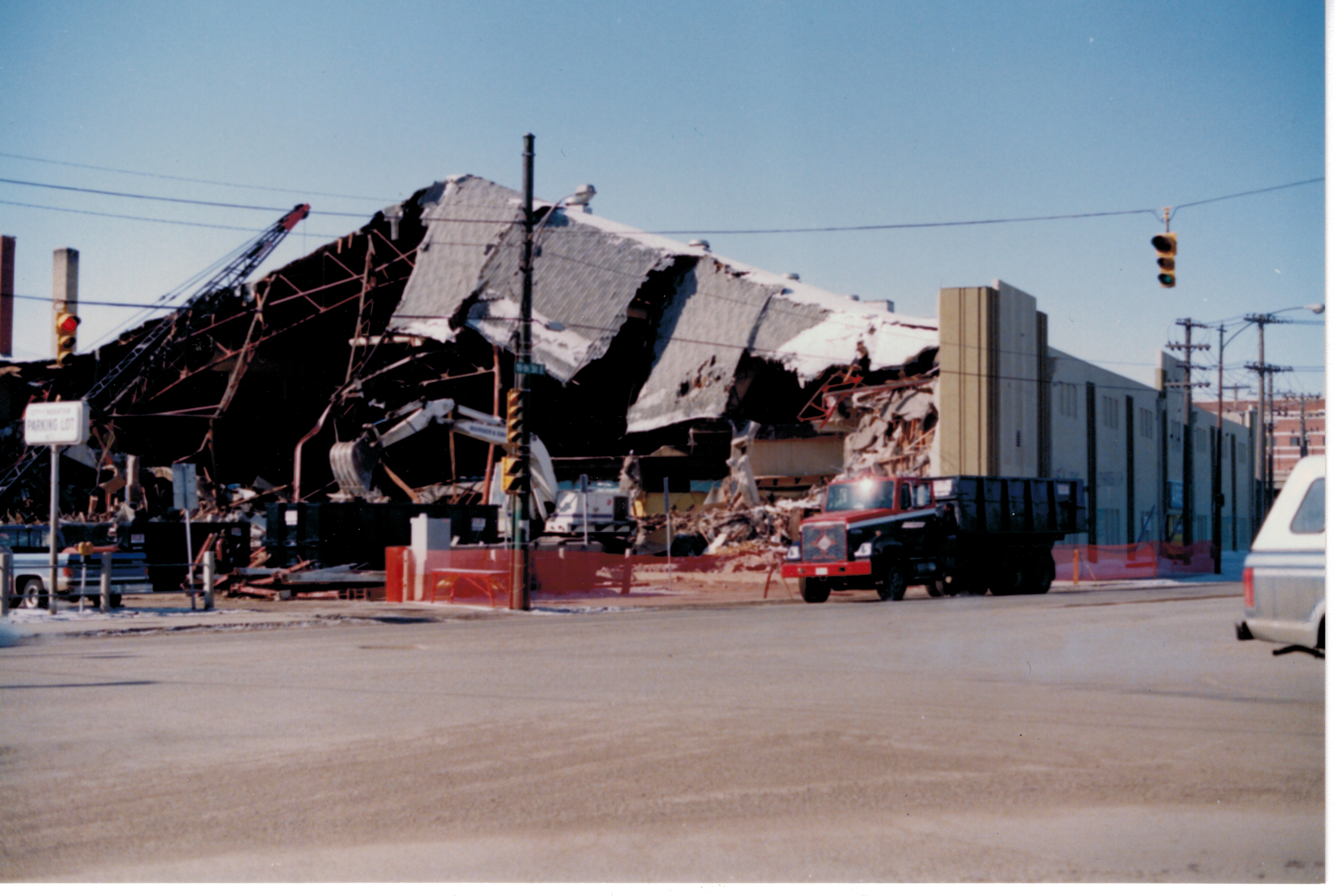
- The demolition of Saskatoon Arena in 1989
- Interactive map of Saskatoon Arena
- Address: 115 19th St E Saskatoon, Saskatchewan
- Coordinates: 52.124°N 106.667°W
- Owner: Saskatoon Arena Limited (1937–1958); City of Saskatoon (1958–1989)
- Capacity: 3,304
- Type: Arena

Construction
- Groundbreaking: September 18, 1937
- Opened: October 30, 1937
- Demolished: March, 1989
- Main contractors: R. J. Arrand Construction Co. Dominion Bridge Company

Tenants
- Saskatoon Quakers (1938–1972); Saskatoon Blades (1964–1988)

Saskatoon Arena was an indoor arena located in Saskatoon, Saskatchewan, which opened in October 1937, and which was demolished in March 1989. The arena was situated in downtown Saskatoon, on a site overlooking the South Saskatchewan River. It was the city's main entertainment venue for a half-century, before it was replaced in 1988 by Saskatchewan Place.

== History ==
Saskatoon Arena was conceived as a replacement for the Crescent Rink, a small arena built in 1920 that was demolished in the early 1930s as part of the construction of the Broadway Bridge, a Depression-era relief work project that was completed in 1932. In 1936, a group of Saskatoon businessmen started lobbying and raising funds for the construction of a new artificial ice arena; the Depression presented a challenge to this vision, but the group formed an organization—Saskatoon Arena Limited (SAL)—to formalize its efforts and manage the project. The arena group ultimately secured $13,000 in relief payments from the city and province and an additional $50,000 in public shares, which were sold for $0.10 each. The land purchase to build the arena involved a ten-year agreement to offer free skating and hockey for school children.

Construction began in September 1937 and the arena opened on October 30, featuring a sold-out hockey game between the New York Rangers and New York Americans of the National Hockey League (NHL). The new arena was "hailed as the only artificial ice surface between Winnipeg and Calgary". SAL secretary Norman Couch, who had been working for the McDonald Tobacco Company, became the arena's manager. SAL ran the facility until it was leased to the City of Saskatoon, beginning in 1956; the City purchased the arena from SAL in 1958, although Couch remained the arena's manager until he retired in 1962. The arena was home to the Saskatoon Quakers hockey team and, from 1964, to the Saskatoon Blades of the Western Hockey League, who remained the building's primary tenants until it closed in 1988. The arena was renowned for having exceptional ice quality.

Nicknamed "The Barn" and also known as the "arena rink", Saskatoon Arena seated just over 3,300 but was known to hold as many as 7,000 with standing room for big events. The arena hosted major events for half of a century, ranging from musical acts to wrestling matches. The rink hosted two national men's curling championships, in 1946 and 1965, and one national women's curling championship, in 1972. The 1946 Macdonald Brier was opened by Saskatchewan Premier Tommy Douglas and was the first to be broadcast nationally on CBC radio, while the 1965 edition set a new tournament attendance record. The 1972 Macdonald Lassies Championship also set a new tournament attendance record and was won by Vera Pezer's Saskatoon rink, their second in a run of three consecutive national titles.

Even in its final decade, as the city debated replacing the aging facility, it continued to host major musical and traveling acts, including the Harlem Globetrotters. However, the facility had outlived its usefulness by the 1970s and had become infamous for its leaky roof and substandard amenities. The city proved hesitant to lose the landmark and a number of years passed between the first proposal to replace the structure in the 1970s and its eventual closure in the late 1980s. The situation was complicated when local sports promoter Bill Hunter instigated efforts to bring the NHL to Saskatoon, including a failed bid to purchase and relocate the St. Louis Blues in the early 1980s. Hunter's efforts included plans to build a modern, 18,000 seat arena, which was considered too big for any available site in downtown Saskatoon. Public plebiscites ultimately rejected the construction of a new downtown arena, and approved construction of Saskatchewan Place in the city's North Industrial area.

The last hockey game at Saskatoon Arena was played on February 2, 1988—Saskatoon beat the Regina Pats 7–0 before a sold-out crowd. The next week, Saskatchewan Place officially opened, becoming the new home of the Blades. Saskatoon Arena was demolished in 1989.

During the summer of 1989, the Arena site was transformed into an amphitheatre to host cultural events during the Canada Summer Games, which were hosted in Saskatoon. During this time, the city was considering a riverbank redevelopment project and it was thought that the Arena site could retain the amphitheatre. However, in 1992, city council decided instead to approve construction of Clinkskill Manor, a low-income retirement home, on the site. The old arena site also became the location of an ironic piece of street naming. For many years, a Saunders Avenue provided access to Saskatchewan Place; but after the 2002 death of Hunter, the street was renamed Bill Hunter Avenue—even though Hunter was known to have opposed the location of Saskatchewan Place. The Saunders name was then transferred to Saunders Place, a street that provides access to Clinkskill Manor and runs through the former site of Saskatoon Arena.

== Tenants ==
Team	League	Years
Saskatoon Quakers	Saskatchewan Senior Hockey League; Western Canada Senior Hockey League; Pacific Coast Hockey League; Western Hockey League; Western Canada Senior Hockey League; Prairie Senior Hockey League	1938–42; 1945–56; 1958–72
Saskatoon Flyers	Saskatchewan Military Hockey League	1942–45
Saskatoon Navy	Saskatchewan Military Hockey League	1942–45
Saskatoon Junior Quakers	Saskatchewan Junior Hockey League	1956–64
Saskatoon Blades	Saskatchewan Junior Hockey League; Western Hockey League	1964–88

=== Major tournaments ===
Event	Sport	Year
Macdonald Brier	Curling	1946, 1965
Macdonald Lassies Championship	Curling	1972

== See also ==
- Ice hockey in Saskatchewan
