= Abraham Salm =

Abraham Salm may refer to:

- Adriaen van Salm, or Abraham Salm (c. 1660 – 1720), painter from Delfshaven
- Ab Salm, short for Abram Salm (1801–1876), painter from Amsterdam
- Abraham Salm (architect) (1857–1915), architect from Amsterdam
