= AB =

AB, ab, or similar may refer to:

== Arts and media ==
- American Bandstand, a music-performance television show
- Analecta Bollandiana, an academic journal on Christian hagiography
- Ancienne Belgique, a concert hall in Brussels, Belgium

== Business ==
=== Businesses ===
==== Manufacturing companies ====
- A & B High Performance Firearms, a defunct sporting firearms manufacturer
- Allen-Bradley, a brand of industrial control products, manufactured by Rockwell Automation
- Anheuser-Busch, a brewing company

==== Media companies ====
- AB Groupe, a French broadcasting group
- Activision Blizzard, an American video game holding company
- American Biograph, a former motion picture company

==== Transportation companies ====
- AB Airlines, a defunct British airline
- Air Berlin (former IATA airline code AB), a former airline operating 1978–2017
- Appenzell Railways (Appenzeller Bahnen), abbreviated AB
- Bonza (IATA code AB), an Australian airline

==== Other companies ====
- AB Bank, a commercial bank in Bangladesh
- Alderson Broaddus University, formerly Alderson-Broaddus College, a private university in West Virginia, US
- Alfa-Beta Vassilopoulos, a Greek supermarket chain
- AllianceBernstein (New York Stock Exchange Symbol AB), a US-based asset management firm

=== Business terminology ===
- Akcinė bendrovė, Lithuanian equivalent of an S.A. corporation
- Aktiebolag, Swedish for "corporation", similar to AG, Ltd or Inc.

== Linguistics ==
- Abkhaz language (ISO 639-1 language code ab), a Northwest Caucasian language spoken mostly by the Abkhaz people
- Ab (cuneiform), a written syllable
- Ab (Semitic), a Semitic word for "father"
- ab, a Welsh patronymic prefix
- Āb, a Persian word, derived from Ap (water), the Vedic Sanskti term for water

== Occupations and ranks ==
- Able seaman, a civilian occupation
- Able seaman (rank), a naval rank
- Airman basic, the lowest rank in the US Air Force

== Organizations ==
- Afrikaner Broederbond, a South African secret society from 1918 to 1994
- Aryan Brotherhood, an American gang

== Places ==
- Āb or Anzab-e Olya, a village in Iran
- AB postcode area, UK, including Aberdeen, Scotland
- AB, the WMO country code of Albania
- AB, the postal abbreviation and ISO 3166 suffix for Alberta, a province in Canada
- Air Base, used by the United States Air Force for overseas bases
- AB, used in vehicle registrations for Aschaffenburg, Germany
- AB, used in vehicle registrations for the Special Region of Yogyakarta, Indonesia

== Science and technology ==
=== Chemistry ===
- Alabamine, a former name of the element astatine
- Albite, a feldspar mineral
- Ammonia borane, a chemical compound
- Antibonding (a.b.), used to describe the character of orbitals in atomic and molecular electronic structure

=== Medicine ===
- AB blood, a blood type in the ABO blood group system
- AB toxin, Type III toxin secreted by some pathogenic bacteria
- Antibody (medical abbreviation)
- Rectus abdominis muscle (common name abs), a paired stomach muscle

=== Other uses in science and technology ===
- AB (star catalogue)
- Aggregate base, a kind of material used in construction
- AB Class amplifier, a classification of electric amplifier
- Category of abelian groups (Ab), in mathematics
- ApacheBench, a command line tool for Apache HTTP Server

== Religion ==
- Ab (Egyptian heart-soul concept), a concept in ancient Egyptian religion
- Pirkei Avot (Hebrew: פִּרְקֵי אָבוֹת, romanized: pirqē aḇoṯ / Pirke Aboth / ..., lit. 'Chapters of the [Fore]fathers'), a compilation from the Mishnaic period (abbreviation "Ab.")
- Aitareya Brahmana, an ancient Indian collection of hymns
- Ab or Av (month), Hebrew: אָב, fifth in the Hebrew calendar, and eleventh in the Tishri-years
- Ab (Classical Mandaic: ࡀࡁ) or Aria (month), seventh in the Mandaean calendar

== Sport ==
- Akademisk Boldklub, a Danish professional football club
- Argja Bóltfelag, a Faroese association football club
- Aviron Bayonnais, French rugby union club
- At bat, in baseball statistics

== Transportation ==
- Borneo Airways Limited, IATA airline designator AB (to 1965)
- NZR Ab class, a New Zealand steam locomotive
- Armed boarding steamer, used by the UK during World War I
- Crane ship (AB) (US Navy hull classification symbol AB)

== People ==
- Ab (given name), a short form of Albert (or occasionally Abraham or Abbott)
- AB de Villiers (born 1984), South African middle order batsman and wicket-keeper
- Adrien Broner (born 1989), American Boxer, nicknamed AB
- Allan Border (born 1955), Australian cricketer, nicknamed A.B.
- Antonio Brown (born 1988), American football player, nicknamed AB

== Other uses ==
- AB, a South Australian dish similar to a Halal snack pack
- Adult baby, a person who practices paraphilic infantilism
- Bachelor of Arts (Latin: Artium baccalaureus)
- Assembly Bill, a type of legislation in the US
- AB (game), a guessing game similar to Mastermind

== See also ==
- A-flat (disambiguation) ("A♭"), the musical note, scale, or key
- Amyloid beta (Aβ), peptides of amino acids that are involved in Alzheimer's disease
- ΑΒ / αβ / alphabeta (disambiguation)
- A/B (disambiguation)
- BA (disambiguation)
- ABC (disambiguation)
