= Jim Dewey =

Canadian ice hockey player

- Played for: Saskatoon Quakers
- National team: Canada

Jim Dewey
Medal record

Men's ice hockey

Representing Canada

World Championships
| Gold medal – first place | 1934 Italy | |

Jim Dewey was a Canadian ice hockey player.

Dewey was a member of the Saskatoon Quakers who represented Canada at the 1934 World Ice Hockey Championships held in Milan, Italy where they won Gold.

== See also ==
- List of Canadian national ice hockey team rosters
