= Hobb Wilson =

Canadian ice hockey player

Harold "Hobb" Wilson
- Born: September 5, 1904; Chippewa Falls, Wisconsin, USA
- Died: October 11, 1977 (aged 73); Saskatoon, Saskatchewan, Canada
- Position: Defense
- Played for: Saskatoon Quakers
- National team: Canada
- Playing career: 1921–1937

Hobb Wilson
Medal record

Men's ice hockey

Representing Canada

World Championships
Gold medal – first place	1934 Italy	

Harold Lawrence "Hobb" Wilson (September 5, 1904 – October 11, 1977) was a Canadian ice hockey player.

Wilson was a member of the Saskatoon Quakers who represented Canada at the 1934 World Ice Hockey Championships held in Milan, Italy where they won Gold.

== See also ==
- List of Canadian national ice hockey team rosters
