= Cliff Lake (ice hockey) =

Canadian ice hockey player (1909–1990)

- Born: September 19, 1909; Saskatoon, Saskatchewan, Canada
- Died: December 1, 1990 (aged 81); Saskatoon, Saskatchewan, Canada
- Played for: Saskatoon Quakers
- National team: Canada
- Playing career: 1926–1936

Cliff Lake
Medal record

Men's ice hockey

Representing Canada

World Championships
Gold medal – first place	1934 Italy	

Clifford Frederick Lake (September 19, 1909 – December 1, 1990) was a Canadian ice hockey player.

Lake was a member of the Saskatoon Quakers who represented Canada at the 1934 World Ice Hockey Championships held in Milan, Italy where they won Gold.

== See also ==
- List of Canadian national ice hockey team rosters
