= Ron Silver (ice hockey) =

Canadian ice hockey player

- Born: September 22, 1907 Brandon, Manitoba, Canada
- Died: July 30, 1993 (aged 85)
- Weight: 180 lb (82 kg; 12 st 12 lb)
- Position: Defence
- Shot: Right
- Played for: Saskatoon Quakers
- National team: Canada
- Playing career: 1930–1935

Ronald Frederick Silver (September 22, 1907 – July 30, 1993) was a Canadian ice hockey player.

Silver was a member of the Saskatoon Quakers who represented Canada at the 1934 World Ice Hockey Championships held in Milan, Italy where they won Gold.

Ron Silver
Medal record

Men's ice hockey

Representing Canada

World Championships
Gold medal – first place	1934 Italy	

Ronald Silver Canadian ice hockey defenceman.
