= Bert Scharfe =

Canadian ice hockey player

- Born: November 17, 1910; Saskatoon, Saskatchewan, Canada
- Died: November 26, 1994 (aged 84); Saskatoon, Saskatchewan, Canada
- Height: 5 ft 9 in (175 cm)
- Weight: 164 lb (74 kg; 11 st 10 lb)
- Position: Centre
- Shot: Right
- Played for: Saskatoon Quakers
- National team: Canada
- Playing career: 1925–1946

Bert Scharfe
Medal record

Men's ice hockey

Representing Canada

World Championships
Gold medal – first place	1934 Italy	

Bert Stanley Scharfe (November 17, 1910 – November 26, 1994) was a Canadian ice hockey player.

Scharfe was a member of the Saskatoon Quakers who represented Canada at the 1934 World Ice Hockey Championships held in Milan, Italy where they won Gold.

== See also ==
- List of Canadian national ice hockey team rosters
