= Les Bird =

Canadian ice hockey player

- Height: 5 ft 11 in (180 cm)
- Weight: 165 lb (75 kg; 11 st 11 lb)
- Position: Left wing
- Played for: Saskatoon Quakers
- National team: Canada

Les Bird
Medal record

Men's ice hockey

Representing Canada

World Championships
Gold medal – first place	1934 Italy	

Les Bird was a Canadian ice hockey player.

Bird was a member of the Saskatoon Quakers who represented Canada at the 1934 World Ice Hockey Championships held in Milan, Italy where they won Gold.

== See also ==
- List of Canadian national ice hockey team rosters
