= Ray Watkins =

Canadian ice hockey player

- Born: January 10, 1903 Rainy River, Ontario, Canada
- Died: October 20, 1975 (aged 72) Saskatoon, Saskatchewan, Canada
- Position: Center
- Played for: Saskatoon Quakers
- National team: Canada
- Playing career: ?–?

Ray Watkins
Medal record

Men's ice hockey

Representing Canada

World Championships
Gold medal – first place	1934 Italy	

Raymond Ralph Watkins (January 10, 1903 – October 20, 1975) was a Canadian ice hockey player.

Watkins was a member of the Saskatoon Quakers who represented Canada at the 1934 World Ice Hockey Championships held in Milan, Italy where they won Gold.

== See also ==
- List of Canadian national ice hockey team rosters
