= Cooney Woods =

Canadian ice hockey player

Cooney Wood
- Born: October 15, 1899
- Died: February 28, 1992 (aged 92); Elora, Ontario, Canada
- Height: 5 ft 8 in (173 cm)
- Weight: 165 lb (75 kg; 11 st 11 lb)
- Position: Goaltender
- Played for: Saskatoon Quakers
- National team: Canada
- Playing career: 1923–1934

Cooney Woods
Medal record

Men's ice hockey

Representing Canada

World Championships
Gold medal – first place	1934 Italy	

Cosford Reynold Woods (October 15, 1899 – February 28, 1992) was a Canadian ice hockey goaltender.

Woods was a member of the Saskatoon Quakers who represented Canada at the 1934 World Ice Hockey Championships held in Milan, Italy where they won Gold.

== See also ==
- List of Canadian national ice hockey team rosters
