= Ab Welsh =

Canadian ice hockey player

- Born: October 8, 1913; Saskatoon, Saskatchewan, Canada
- Died: April 23, 1971 (aged 57)
- Height: 5 ft 9 in (175 cm)
- Weight: 160 lb (73 kg; 11 st 6 lb)
- Position: Right wing
- Played for: Wembley Lions; Saskatoon Quakers
- National team: Canada
- Playing career: 1937–1942

Ab Welsh
Medal record

Men's ice hockey

Representing Canada

World Championships
Gold medal – first place	1934 Italy	

Albert Myles "Ab" Welsh (October 8, 1913 – April 23, 1971) was a Canadian ice hockey player. Welsh was a member of the Saskatoon Quakers who represented Canada at the 1934 World Ice Hockey Championships held in Milan, Italy where they won Gold.

== See also ==
- List of Canadian national ice hockey team rosters
