= Ice hockey in Saskatchewan =

Sports culture

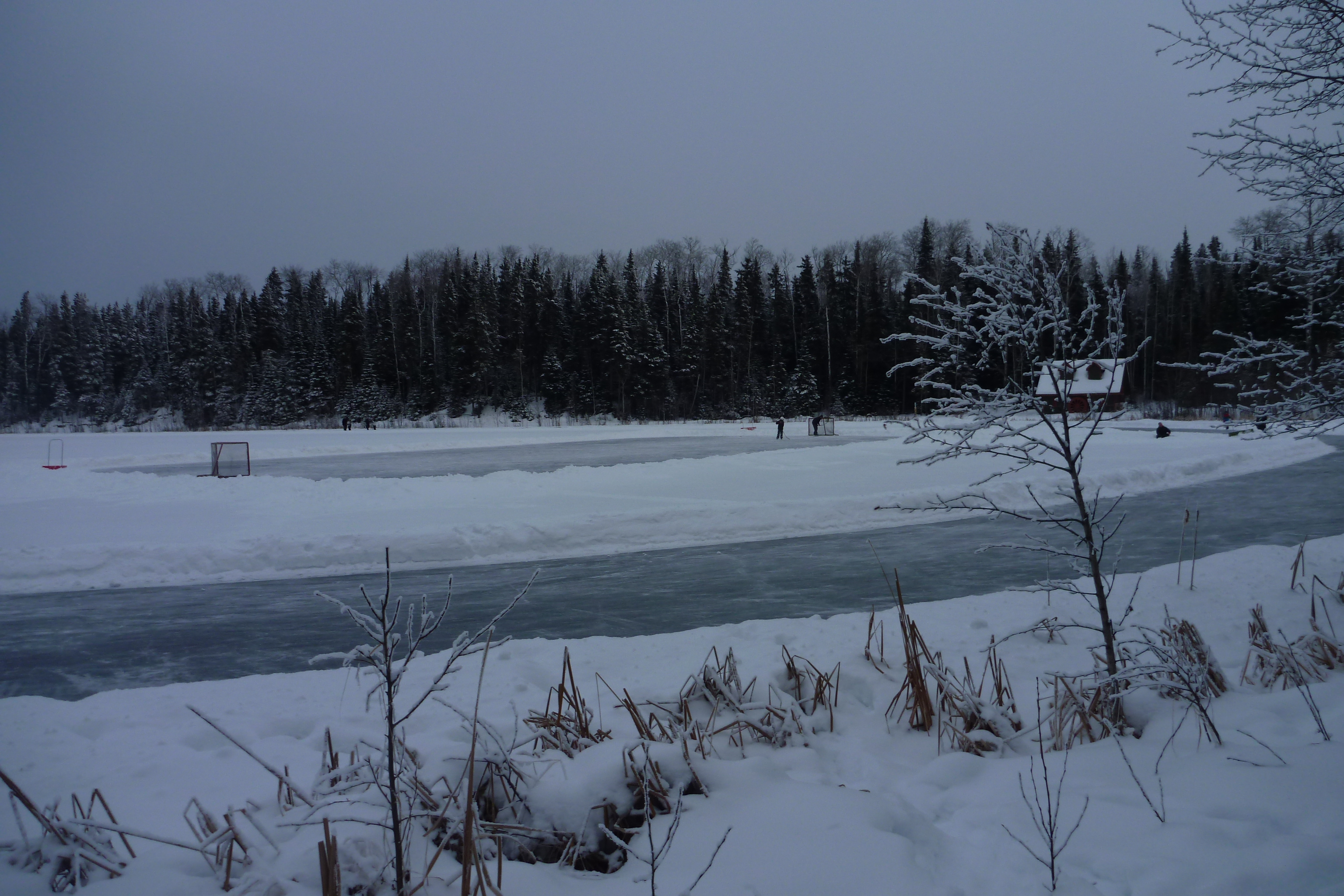
A pond hockey rink in Saskatchewan

Ice hockey is among the most popular sports in the Canadian province of Saskatchewan, and the province has been notable for producing a large number of hockey figures in both men's and women's hockey. Saskatchewan does not currently have a professional hockey team of its own, but it is home to a large number of junior and senior hockey teams. The sport is governed in the province by Hockey Saskatchewan.

== Beginnings ==
Saskatchewan became a province in 1905, but Canadian settlement in the region began decades earlier and by the 1890s ice hockey was becoming established as a popular pastime in the area. The first recorded organized games occurred in 1894, and teams were soon established in communities like Saskatoon, Regina, Moose Jaw, and Prince Albert. The Saskatchewan Amateur Hockey Association was established in 1906. Saskatchewan teams had some success on the early national amateur circuit with the Regina Victorias winning the 1914 Allan Cup, followed by the Melville Millionaires in 1915.

== Saskatchewan hockey players ==
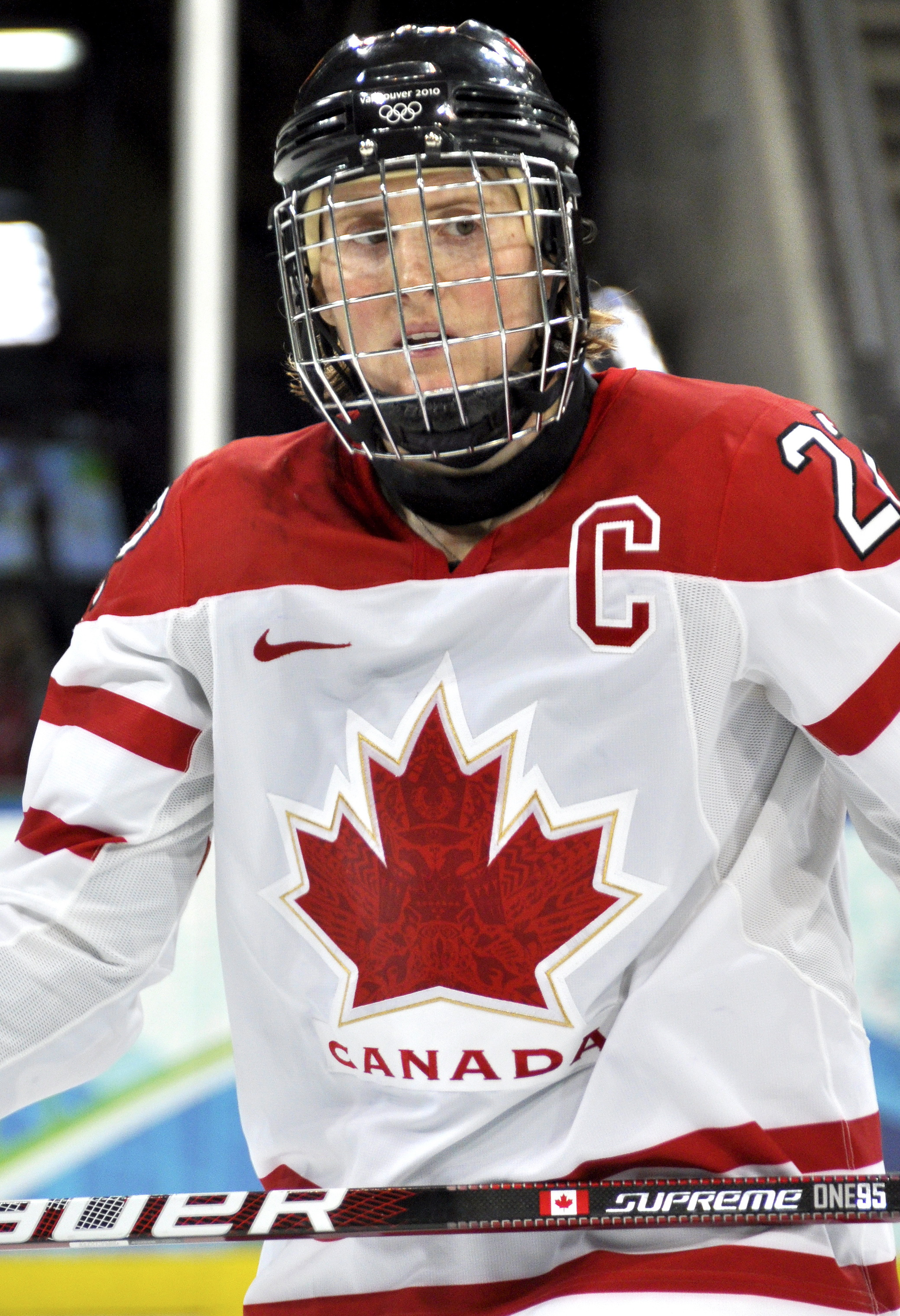
Hayley Wickenheiser at the 2010 Winter Olympics

Saskatchewan is notable for producing more than 500 National Hockey League (NHL) players throughout the 20th and 21st centuries, the most per capita of any Canadian province, American state, or European country. It is common for small towns around the province to have highway signs listing local NHL players. Saskatchewan hockey products include Gordie Howe from Floral, dubbed "Mr. Hockey" and widely regarded as one of the greatest hockey players of all time. Howe played 26 seasons in the NHL, mostly with the Detroit Red Wings, won the Stanley Cup four times, and upon his retirement held league records for most career goals and points, records that were eventually broken by Wayne Gretzky. Today, there is a bridge and sports complex named after Howe in Saskatoon, a statue of Howe stationed outside of the city's SaskTel Centre arena, and a major bridge between Windsor and Detroit named after him under construction.

Some other notable men's players from Saskatchewan include Max Bentley, one of six hockey-playing brothers who won the Hart Trophy in 1946 as NHL MVP and three Stanley Cups with the Toronto Maple Leafs; Johnny Bower, who twice won the Vezina Trophy as best goaltender and won four Stanley Cups with the Maple Leafs; Clark Gillies, a former captain of the New York Islanders who won four consecutive Stanley Cups with the team from 1980 to 1983 and was elected to the Hockey Hall of Fame in 2002; Bryan Trottier, who was part of the same Islanders dynasty; and Patrick Marleau, who won two Olympic gold medals with Canada and played 23 NHL seasons, surpassing Howe for the most games played in league history in 2021. Another prominent figure from Saskatchewan is Mike Babcock, who won a Stanley Cup as coach of the Red Wings in 2008 and also coached Team Canada to Olympic gold at both the 2010 and 2014 Winter Olympics. Dave King and Willie Desjardins are two other former players who coached Canada at the Olympics, as well as in the NHL. Among active Stanley Cup winning coaches, Jared Bednar of the Colorado Avalanche hails from Saskatchewan. Some other Hall of Fame men's players from Saskatchewan include Fernie Flaman, Bert Olmstead, Bernie Federko, Elmer Lach, Sid Abel, Glenn Hall, Eddie Shore, Bryan Hextall, Clint Smith, and Emile Francis in the Builder category. Ryan Getzlaf and Chris Kunitz both won Olympic gold medals with Team Canada, while Jordan Eberle scored one of Canada's most iconic goals at the 2009 World Junior Championships. Fred Sasakamoose has been honoured as a trailblazer for First Nations hockey players.

Many prominent women's players have also come from Saskatchewan. Hayley Wickenheiser was the first female skater to play full-time professional hockey in a men's league and is regarded as one of the greatest hockey players of all time. She helped lead Team Canada to five Olympic finals, winning four gold medals. Wickenheiser frequently captained the national team and became its all-time leading scorer at the 2010 Olympics. She was inducted into the IIHF Hall of Fame in 2019. Other notable women players from Saskatchewan include three-time Olympic gold medalist Colleen Sostorics, two-time Olympic gold medalist Gina Kingsbury, and Emily Clark, who helped Canada win Olympic gold in 2022. In 2023, Clark became one of the first women ever signed to a contract in the Professional Women's Hockey League, signing with PWHL Ottawa; Clark would be one of four Saskatchewan women playing in the PWHL's inaugural six-team season. Shannon Miller coached Canada to a gold medal at the 1997 Women's World Championship and silver at the 1998 Olympics. In 2024, Jessica Campbell became the first woman to coach on an NHL bench after she was hired as an assistant coach by the Seattle Kraken.

== Professional hockey ==
=== Early history ===
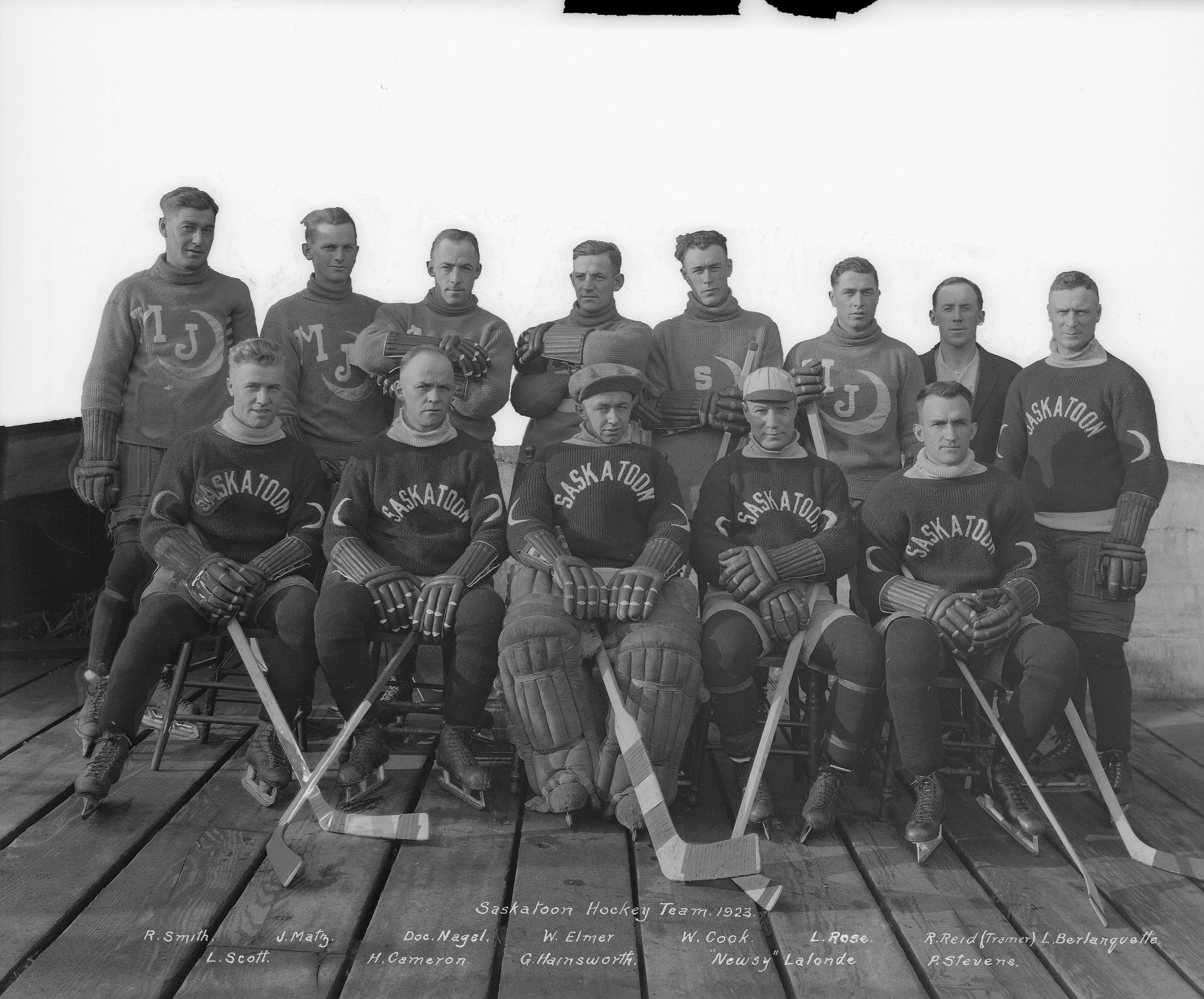
Saskatoon's WCHL team in 1923

Professional hockey existed in Saskatchewan as early as the 1910s. The Prince Albert Mintos went professional in 1911 and lost a series against the Port Arthur Bearcats for the opportunity to challenge the Stanley Cup champion Ottawa Senators. The Western Canada Hockey League was the prairie equivalent of the National Hockey League and began in the winter of 1921; its champion played the winner of the Pacific Coast Hockey Association to determine who would represent the West in the Stanley Cup finals. The Saskatoon Sheiks and Regina Capitals were among the founding franchises in the WCHL. During the league's inaugural season in 1921–22, the Sheiks moved to Moose Jaw; they returned to Saskatoon the following season under a new name, the Crescents, and then reverted to the Sheiks name ahead of the 1923–24 season. The Regina Capitals moved to Portland after the 1924–25 season, leaving the Sheiks as the only Saskatchewan team in the league. The WCHL folded after the 1925–26 season, with some of its teams and players being sold to create expansion NHL franchises. What remained of the Sheiks and Capitals, and a new team in Moose Jaw, played for two seasons in the new semi-professional Prairie Hockey League before it, too, folded, leaving Saskatchewan devoid of professional hockey for more than two decades. The Sheiks, playing out of Saskatoon's Crescent Arena, won the final Prairie Hockey League title in 1928.

The Saskatoon Quakers, a veteran senior team based out of Saskatoon Arena—which, upon opening in 1937, featured an exhibition game between the NHL's New York Rangers and New York Americans—joined the minor-professional Pacific Coast Hockey League in 1951, capturing the PCHL championship in 1951–52 before folding in 1956 due to the financial demands of running a professional team. The 1957–58 season saw the Brandon Regals team re-branded as the Saskatoon/St. Paul Regals, which split games between Saskatoon and Saint Paul, Minnesota. This novel experiment lasted one season; in 1958, the team hosted games only in Saskatoon and adopted the old Quakers name. They played just one more season before folding in 1959. The brothers Reg, Doug, and Max Bentley from Delisle were famous hockey players that played with the Quakers.

=== Courting a team ===
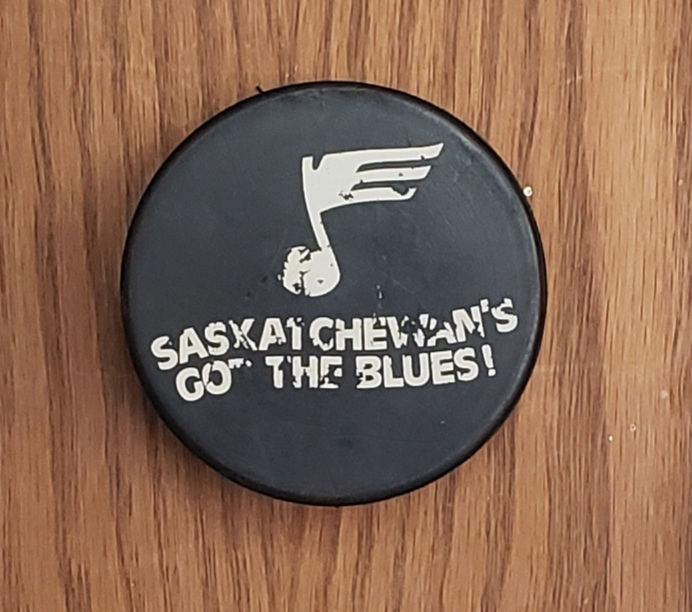
Promotional puck deriving from Bill Hunter's efforts to relocate the St. Louis Blues to Saskatoon in 1983

Although no professional hockey team has operated in Saskatchewan since 1959, interest in bringing a major professional franchise to the province has persisted. Moreover, Saskatoon native "Wild" Bill Hunter was an instrumental figure in the founding of the World Hockey Association in 1971, which ultimately merged with the NHL in 1979. Hunter became driven to bring the NHL to Saskatoon, and his first plan involved pursuing the re-location of a struggling WHA franchise to Saskatoon in hopes of having it included in that merger. However, this effort came to nothing due to opposition from other WHA owners concerned that the inclusion of a Saskatoon franchise would upset the delicate merger negotiations with the NHL, as well as Hunter's inability to get a commitment for a new facility to replace the small and aging Saskatoon Arena. Following the merger, Hunter made another attempt in 1983 when he purchased the struggling St. Louis Blues with a plan to re-locate the franchise to Saskatoon. Although this time Hunter would secure commitments for 18,000 season tickets and a new arena in downtown Saskatoon, the NHL blocked the sale and re-location and an owner willing to keep the Blues in St. Louis was found.

Following the completion of the new Saskatchewan Place arena, an ownership group including Hunter applied for a Saskatoon-based franchise to join the NHL as part of the league's early 1990s expansion. The group reportedly raised $50 million for the bid, but were turned down by the province for the final $20 million required and withdrew the bid. The prospect that an NHL franchise might still come to Saskatchewan persisted after the league regularly included Saskatchewan Place as a venue for a series of neutral site games included as part of the league's expanded 84 game schedule starting with the 1992–93 NHL season. However, the league scrapped the neutral site games after reverting to an 82-game schedule following the 1994–95 NHL lockout, and serious interest in bringing an NHL team to Saskatchewan declined through the latter half of the 1990s and the 2000s after the re-locations of the original Winnipeg Jets and Quebec Nordiques to American cities appeared to offer ample evidence that an NHL franchise in Saskatchewan could not be financially viable, especially while the Canadian dollar traded at a significant discount to the U.S. dollar.

A number of changed circumstances in the first decade of the twenty-first century, including the introduction of a salary cap following the 2004–05 NHL lockout, a return of the exchange rate to parity, a relatively strong provincial economy, and reports of a number of U.S. franchises struggling led to speculation that Saskatchewan would again attempt to acquire an NHL franchise. Following the NHL takeover of the bankrupt Phoenix Coyotes, a Canadian-American ownership group called Ice Edge Holdings that was negotiating to purchase the Coyotes announced their intention to play a limited number of Coyotes home games in Saskatoon as part of an overall plan to keep the team based in Arizona. While it was speculated that this might have been part of a larger bid to prove the viability of Saskatoon as an NHL city, Ice Edge eventually withdrew its bid.

In 2019, Regina hosted the NHL Heritage Classic game between the Winnipeg Jets and Calgary Flames at Mosaic Stadium.

In January 2022, the Jets considered playing home games in Saskatoon due to COVID-19 pandemic-related restrictions in Manitoba. The team ultimately decided against the plan.

The province was for a short time home to a women's professional team, the Saskatchewan Prairie Ice, which was based out of Lumsden and played from 2003 to 2007 in the Western Women's Hockey League.

== Junior hockey ==
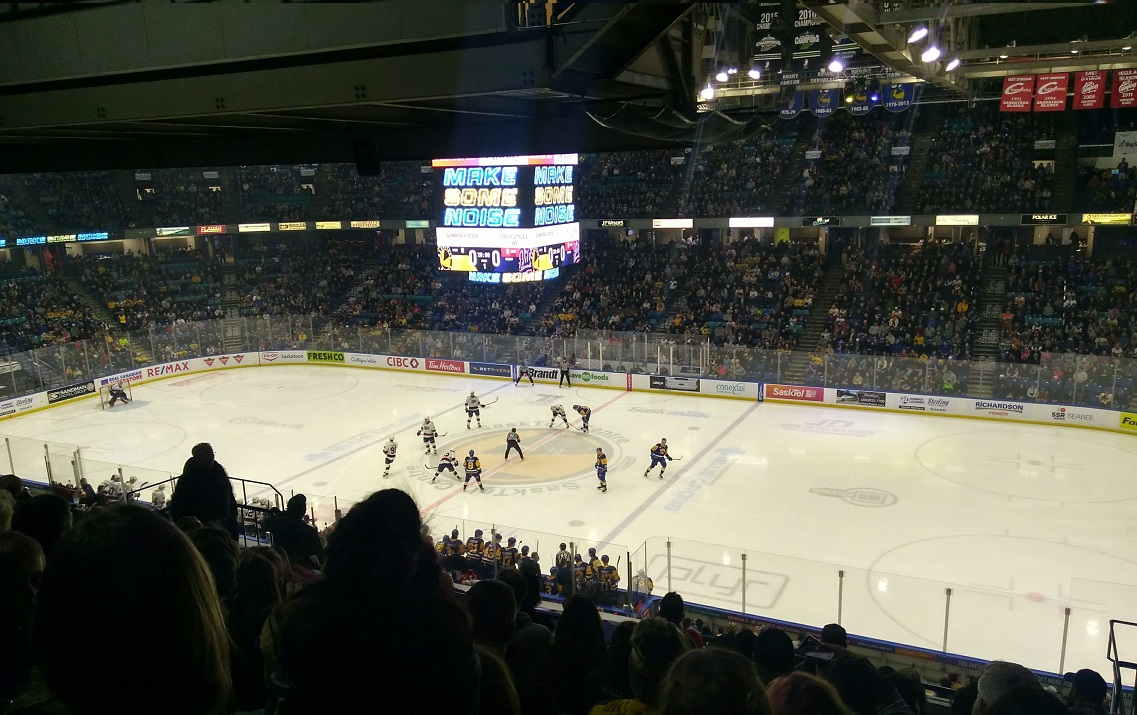
The Saskatoon Blades and Regina Pats face off in the 2023 WHL playoffs at SaskTel Centre

Saskatchewan has a long tradition of junior hockey. The Saskatchewan Junior Hockey League operated as the top level of amateur hockey in the province from 1948 to 1966. In 1966, half a decade before helping found the WHA, Bill Hunter was the owner, manager, and coach of the Edmonton Oil Kings; he joined forces with three SJHL owners—Scotty Munro of the Estevan Bruins, Del Murphy of the Regina Pats, and Jim Piggott of the Saskatoon Blades—to found the Canadian Major Junior Hockey League in an attempt to create a western Canadian league that could compete with the larger amateur associations in eastern Canada. The Weyburn Red Wings and Moose Jaw Canucks also left the SJHL to join the fledgling league, but the Canadian Amateur Hockey Association (CAHA) labelled it an "outlaw league" and suspended its teams from competing for the Memorial Cup. However, the new league held together and when the CAHA reorganized Canadian junior hockey in 1971, it recognized the CMJHL, now called the Western Canada Hockey League, as one of three top tier junior leagues in the country. In 1978 that league was renamed again as the Western Hockey League (WHL), which today features five Saskatchewan teams: the Blades and Pats are joined by the Moose Jaw Warriors, the Prince Albert Raiders, and the Swift Current Broncos. Since the founding of the WHL, the Pats have won two league titles and one Memorial Cup; however, their history dates back to 1917, and the team has won four Memorial Cup championships overall. The Raiders and Broncos have each won one Memorial Cup title. The Memorial Cup tournament has been hosted in Saskatchewan nine times, most recently in Regina in 2018.

Saskatoon has twice hosted the World Junior Ice Hockey Championships, in 1991 and alongside Regina in 2010. Prominent Saskatchewan players to play in the tournament for Canada include Theoren Fleury, Ryan Getzlaf, Jordan Eberle, and Brayden Schenn. Canada's all-time leading scorer at the tournament, Connor Bedard, played three seasons for the Regina Pats and served as team captain.

The Saskatchewan Junior Hockey League was revived after the founding of the WHL as a Junior 'A' league, and today features 12 teams, including the Bruins and Red Wings, who returned after stints in the WHL.

== Other hockey ==
=== University ===
The University of Saskatchewan and the University of Regina both ice women's and men's hockey teams that compete in the Canada West division of U Sports. The Saskatchewan Huskies have been competing nationally since 1911. The men's team has made seven appearances in the University Cup finals, winning once, in 1983. The University of Saskatchewan has hosted the competition five times, and lost in the final at home to the Alberta Golden Bears in 2014. Saskatchewan is slated to host the women's final for the first time in 2024; the women's team's best national finish was third in 2014 and in 2022. The Cougars men's team made one appearance in the final, losing as the host in 1980. The Cougars women's team hosted the final twice, in 2002 and 2003; the team's best finish came in 2001, when Regina lost the national final.

=== Senior ===
Saskatchewan has been home to many successful senior hockey teams. Currently, the major senior league is the Qu'Appelle Valley Highway Hockey League, which currently has seven teams in the Regina area.

== Saskatchewan hockey teams & events ==
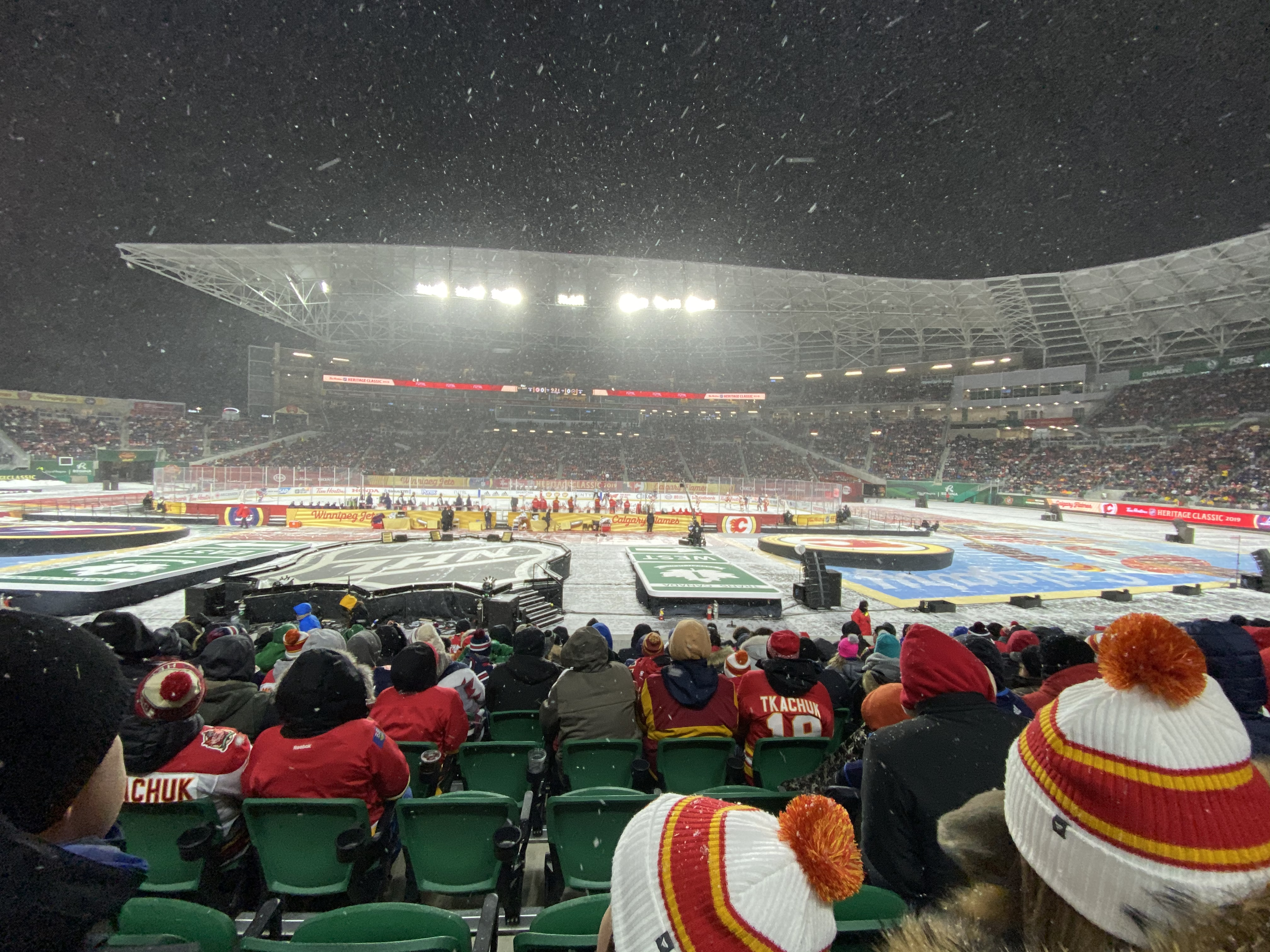
The 2019 Heritage Classic between the Calgary Flames and Winnipeg Jets was played at Mosaic Stadium in Regina

=== Major junior ===
Club	League	Venue	Capacity	Since	City	League championships	National championships
Regina Pats	WHL	Brandt Centre	6,000	1917	Regina	2 (1974, 1980)	4 (1925, 1928, 1930, 1974)
Saskatoon Blades	WHL	SaskTel Centre	15,195	1964	Saskatoon	0	0
Swift Current Broncos	WHL	Innovation Credit Union iPlex	2,879	1967	Swift Current	3 (1989, 1993, 2018)	1 (1989)
Prince Albert Raiders	WHL	Art Hauser Centre	2,580	1971	Prince Albert	2 (1985, 2019)	1 (1985)
Moose Jaw Warriors	WHL	Mosaic Place	4,500	1984	Moose Jaw	1 (2024)	0

=== University ===
The Huskies and Cougars ice both men's and women's teams.

Club	Competition	City	Venue	Capacity	Since	National championships
Saskatchewan Huskies	U Sports (Canada West)	Saskatoon	Merlis Belsher Place	2,700	1911	1 (1983)
Regina Cougars	U Sports (Canada West	Regina	The Co-operators Centre	1,300	1968	0

=== Saskatchewan Junior Hockey League (Junior A) ===
Team	City	Arena	Since	National championships
Weyburn Red Wings	Weyburn	Crescent Point Place	1961	2 (1984, 2005)
Humboldt Broncos	Humboldt	Elgar Peterson Arena	1970	2 (2003, 2008)
Melville Millionaires	Melville	Horizon Credit Union Centre	1970	0
Notre Dame Hounds	Wilcox	Duncan McNeill Arena	1970	1 (1988)
Estevan Bruins	Estevan	Affinity Place	1971	0
Yorkton Terriers	Yorkton	Farrell Agencies Arena	1972	1 (2014)
Battlefords North Stars	North Battleford	North Battleford Civic Centre	1973	0
Flin Flon Bombers	Flin Flon, Manitoba	Whitney Forum	1984	0
Nipawin Hawks	Nipawin	Centennial Arena	1985	0
Melfort Mustangs	Melfort	Northern Lights Palace	1988	0
Kindersley Klippers	Kindersley	West Central Events Centre	1991	0
La Ronge Ice Wolves	La Ronge	Mel Hegland Arena	1998	0

=== Major events hosted ===
Event	Host community & year
Memorial Cup	Regina, Moose Jaw & Winnipeg (1947), Regina (1955, 2001, 2018), Regina & Flin Flon (1957), Regina & Montreal (1969), Regina & Brandon (1980), Saskatoon (1989, 2013)
IIHF World Junior Championship	Saskatoon (1991), Saskatoon & Regina (2010)
CHL/NHL Top Prospects Game	1992, 2002
U Sports University Cup	Saskatoon (1998, 1999, 2000, 2013, 2014)
NHL Heritage Classic	Regina (2019)
4 Nations Cup	Saskatoon (2018)
2007 Super Series	Saskatoon (2007)

== Hockey Hall of Fame inductees ==
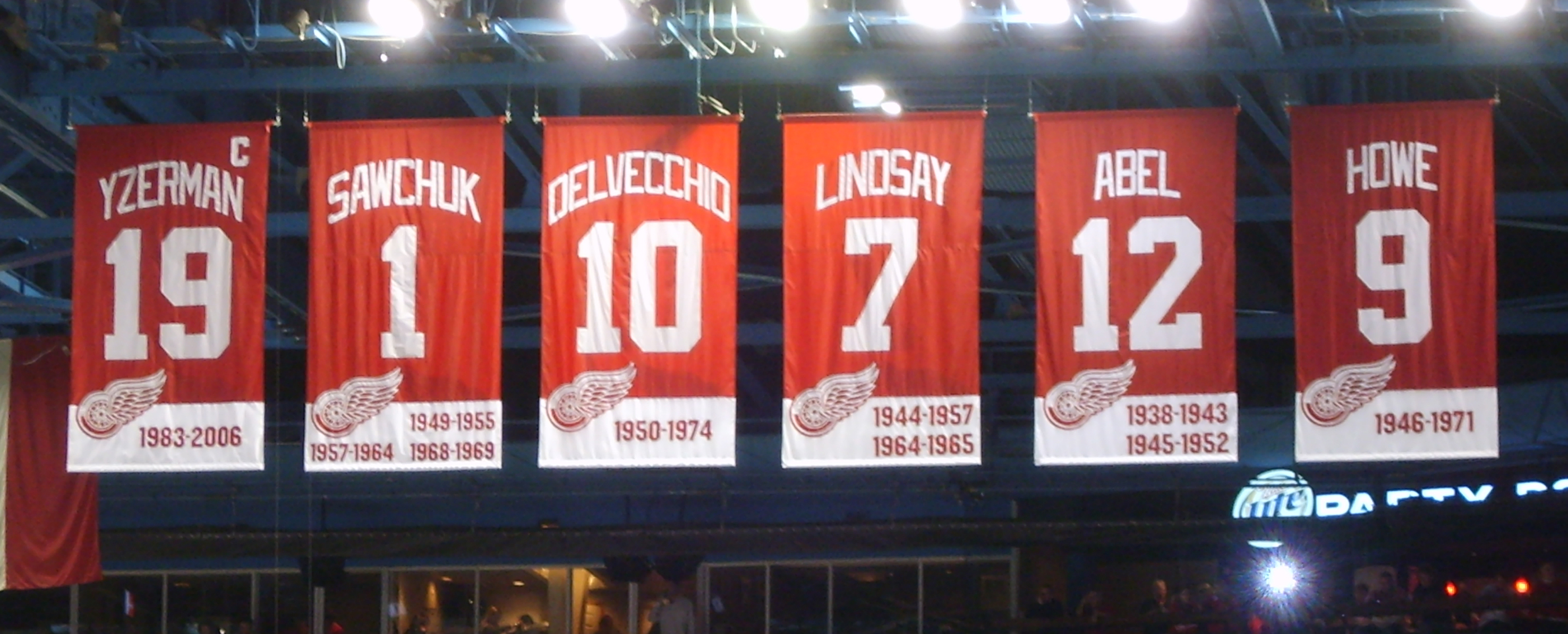
Sid Abel (12) and Gordie Howe (9), two Saskatchewan Hall-of-Famers, have their numbers retired by the Detroit Red Wings

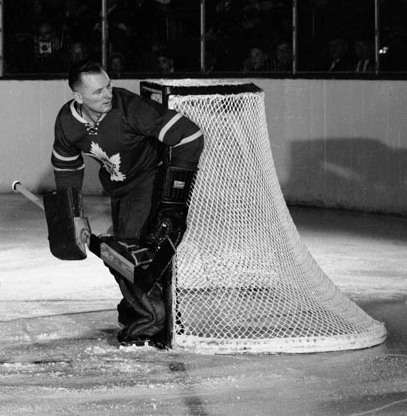
Johnny Bower in net for the Maple Leafs

The following is a list of players from Saskatchewan inducted into the Hockey Hall of Fame.

Name	Year inducted
Sid Abel	1969
Doug Bentley	1964
Max Bentley	1966
Johnny Bower	1976
Bernie Federko	2002
Fernie Flaman	1990
Clark Gillies	2002
Glenn Hall	1975
Bryan Hextall	1969
Gordie Howe	1972
Elmer Lach	1966
Bert Olmstead	1985
Chuck Rayner	1973
Eddie Shore	1947
Clint Smith	1991
Bryan Trottier	1997
Harry Watson	1994
Hayley Wickenheiser	2019

In 2012, Hockey Saskatchewan founded its own Hall of Fame—known as the Ted Knight Saskatchewan Hockey Hall of Fame—to honour contributions to the sport in the province.

== See also ==
- List of ice hockey teams in Saskatchewan
- Sport in Saskatchewan
