= Crescent Arena =

Indoor arena in Saskatoon, Saskatchewan

Crescent Arena, also known as Crescent Rink and Saskatoon Arena, was an indoor arena in Saskatoon, Saskatchewan.

== History ==
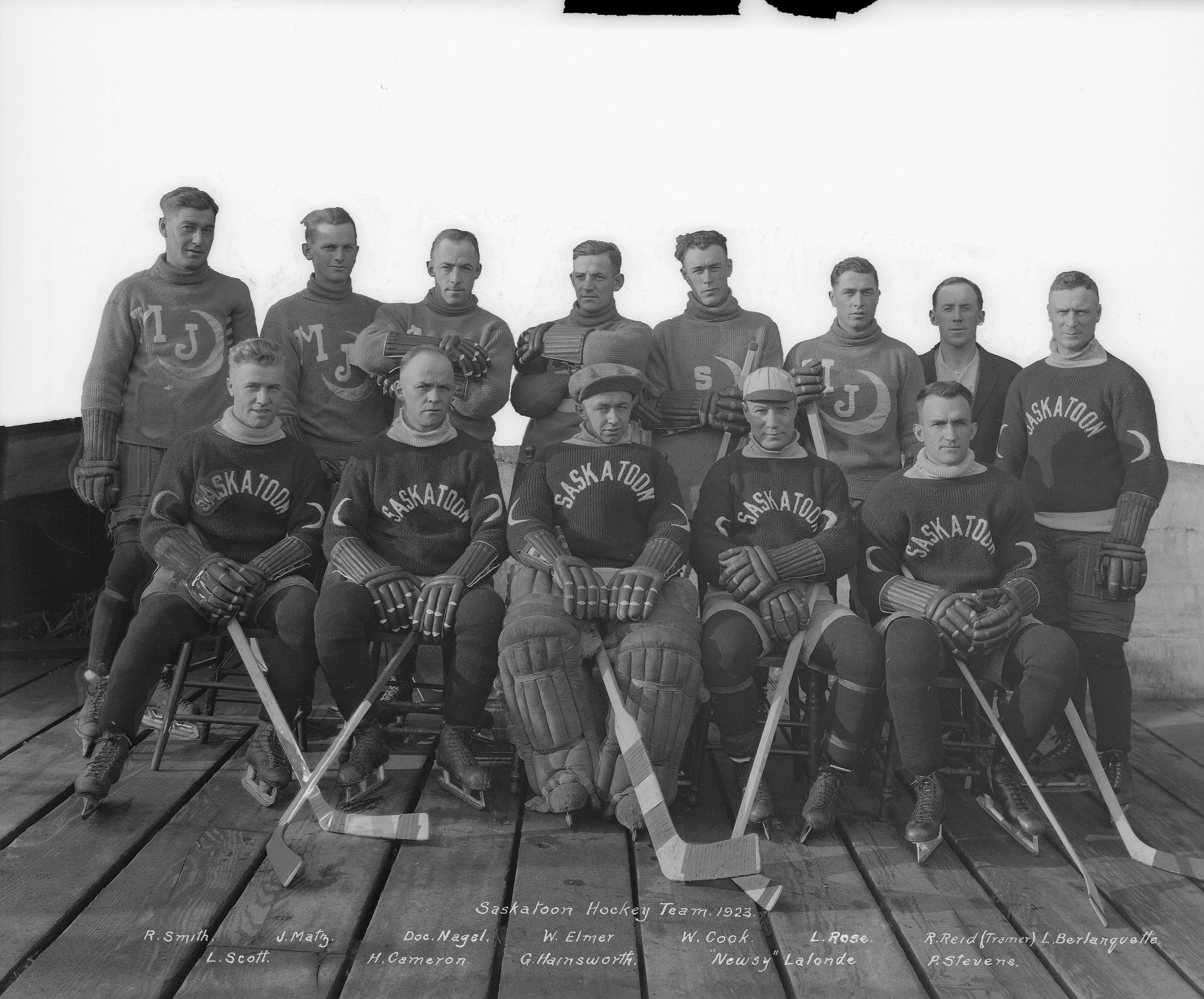
The Saskatoon Crescents, c. 1923

Crescent Rink was built in the late 1910s on Spadina Crescent East in downtown Saskatoon. This was the site of the former Auditorium Roller Rink, a hardwood-floor rink that could be repurposed for curling; the Roller Rink had opened in 1910 but burned down in 1914. Crescent Rink opened in 1920, and it became the home of the Saskatoon Sheiks professional hockey team, which played in the Western Canada Hockey League from 1921 to 1926 and the Prairie Hockey League from 1926 to 1928. After briefly relocating to Moose Jaw during the 1921–22 season, the team returned to Saskatoon and was known as the Saskatoon Crescents for the 1922–23 season before readopting the Sheiks name. The Sheiks won the last Prairie Hockey League championship in 1928.

Crescent Rink was demolished in 1932 to make way for the construction of the Broadway Bridge, a Depression relief-work project. A replacement for Crescent Rink, Saskatoon Arena, opened in 1937, two blocks to the west.

== See also ==
- Ice hockey in Saskatchewan
