= Ab Rogers =

Canadian ice hockey player

- Born: September 16, 1909; Winnipeg, Manitoba, Canada
- Height: 5 ft 8 in (173 cm)
- Weight: 162 lb (73 kg; 11 st 8 lb)
- Position: Right wing
- Shot: Right
- Played for: Saskatoon Quakers
- National team: Canada
- Playing career: 1925–1947

Ab Rogers
Medal record

Men's ice hockey

Representing Canada

World Championships
Gold medal – first place	1934 Italy	

Albert Frank "Ab" Rogers (born September 16, 1909, date of death not found) was a Canadian ice hockey player.

Rogers was a member of the Saskatoon Quakers who represented Canada at the 1934 World Ice Hockey Championships held in Milan, Italy where they won Gold.

== See also ==
- List of Canadian national ice hockey team rosters
