= 1934 Ice Hockey World Championships =

1934 edition of the World Ice Hockey Championships

Tournament details
- Host country: Italy
- Venue: 1 (in 1 host city)
- Dates: 3–11 February
- Teams: 12

Final positions
- Champions: Canada (7th title)
- Runners-up: United States
- Third place: Germany
- Fourth place: Switzerland

Tournament statistics
- Games played: 33
- Goals scored: 127 (3.85 per game)

The 1934 Ice Hockey World Championships were held from February 3–11, 1934, at the Palazzo del Ghiaccio in Milan, Italy. Canada won its seventh world championship, defeating the United States in the final. The World Championship bronze medal and the European Championship title went to Germany. It was the second European Championship title for the Germans.

Like the previous year's World Championship twelve teams participated, with defending champions United States and Canada advancing directly to the second-round. The other ten teams split into three preliminary groups for the six remaining second round places. In the preliminary Group C, there was a stalemate among the three teams; all three earned two points with equal goal differentials. As a result, the organizing committee decided that all three teams in Group C should advance. With nine instead of eight teams in the second round, the format was changed from two groups of four teams to three groups of three teams. The group winners advanced directly to the semi-finals, while the fourth semifinal position was decided by an extra qualifying round for the second-place finishers. The second and third place teams in the extra qualifying round were awarded fifth and sixth positions, and the six teams not advancing to the semifinals or semifinal qualification round played a round-robin series for positions seven through twelve.

== First round ==
=== Group A ===
Pos	Team	Pld	W	D	L	GF	GA	GD	Pts	Qualification or relegation
1	Hungary	2	1	0	1	2	1	+1	2	Advance to second round
2	Czechoslovakia	2	1	0	1	2	2	0	2	Advance to second round
3	Great Britain	2	1	0	1	2	3	−1	2	Relegation to consolation round

Source: Complete results

February 3 to February 5
Hungary	2–0	Great Britain
Great Britain	2–1	Czechoslovakia
Czechoslovakia	1–0	Hungary

=== Group B ===
Pos	Team	Pld	W	D	L	GF	GA	GD	Pts	Qualification or relegation
1	Switzerland	3	3	0	0	30	3	+27	6	Advance to second round
2	France	3	1	0	2	4	6	−2	2	Advance to second round
3	Romania	3	1	0	2	6	13	−7	2	Relegation to consolation round
4	Belgium	3	1	0	2	5	23	−18	2	Relegation to consolation round

Source: Complete results

February 3 to February 5
Switzerland	20–1	Belgium
France	4–1	Romania
Romania	3–2	Belgium
Switzerland	3–0	France
Belgium	2–0	France
Switzerland	7–2	Romania

=== Group C ===
Pos	Team	Pld	W	D	L	GF	GA	GD	Pts	Qualification or relegation
1	Germany	2	1	0	1	4	4	0	2	Advance to second round
2	Italy (H)	2	1	0	1	3	3	0	2	Advance to second round
3	Austria	2	1	0	1	2	2	0	2	Advance to second round

Source: Complete results
(H) Hosts

February 3 to February 5
Austria	2–1	Germany
Germany	3–2	Italy
Italy	1–0	Austria

== Second round ==
=== Group A ===
Pos	Team	Pld	W	D	L	GF	GA	GD	Pts	Qualification or relegation
1	United States	2	2	0	0	2	0	+2	4	Advance to semifinal round
2	Czechoslovakia	2	1	0	1	4	1	+3	2	Advance to semifinal qualifying round
3	Austria	2	0	0	2	0	5	−5	0	Relegation to consolation round

Source: Complete results

February 6 to February 8
United States	1–0	Czechoslovakia
Czechoslovakia	4–0	Austria
United States	1–0	Austria

=== Group B ===
Pos	Team	Pld	W	D	L	GF	GA	GD	Pts	Qualification or relegation
1	Switzerland	2	2	0	0	4	0	+4	4	Advance to semifinal round
2	Hungary	2	0	1	1	0	1	−1	1	Advance to semifinal qualifying round
3	Italy (H)	2	0	1	1	0	3	−3	1	Relegation to consolation round

Source: Complete results
(H) Hosts

February 6 to February 8
Italy	1–0 (OT)	Hungary
Switzerland	1–0	Hungary
Switzerland	3–0	Italy

=== Group C ===
Pos	Team	Pld	W	D	L	GF	GA	GD	Pts	Qualification or relegation
1	Canada	2	2	0	0	15	0	+15	4	Advance to semifinal round
2	Germany	2	1	0	1	4	6	−2	2	Advance to semifinal qualifying round
3	France	2	0	0	2	0	13	−13	0	Relegation to consolation round

Source: Complete results

February 6 to February 8
Canada	9–0	France
Canada	6–0	Germany
Germany	4–0	France

== Third round ==
=== Semifinal qualifying round ===
Pos	Team	Pld	W	D	L	GF	GA	GD	Pts	Qualification or relegation
1	Germany	1	1	0	0	1	0	+1	2	Advance to semifinal round
2	Czechoslovakia	1	0	0	1	0	1	−1	0	Finishes in 5th place
3	Hungary (Note: Hungary withdrew forfeiting their games.)	0	0	0	0	0	0	0	0	Finishes in 6th place

Source: Complete results
Notes:

February 8
Germany	1–0 (OT)	Czechoslovakia

=== Consolation round—7th to 12th places ===
As the bottom finishers in their respective preliminary groups (group C qualified all its teams for the second round), Great Britain and Belgium played a qualification match to determine which of them joined the round robin; the loser (Belgium) finished the tournament in 12th place.

February 8
Great Britain	3–0	Belgium

Pos	Team	Pld	W	D	L	GF	GA	GD	Pts	Final result
1	Austria	3	2	1	0	7	3	+4	5	Finishes in 7th place
2	Great Britain	3	2	0	1	7	4	+3	4	Finishes in 8th place
3	Italy (H)	3	1	1	1	6	6	0	3	Finishes in 9th place
4	Romania	3	0	0	3	1	8	−7	0	Finishes in 10th place
5	France (Note: Withdrew before playing any matches, finishing in 11th place.)	0	0	0	0	0	0	0	0	Finishes in 11th place

Source: Complete results
(H) Hosts
Notes:

February 9 to February 11
Austria	2–1	Great Britain
Italy	3–0	Romania
Austria	3–0	Romania
Great Britain	4–1	Italy
Great Britain	2–1	Romania
Italy	2–2 (OT)	Austria

== Semifinal and final rounds ==
Semi-finals
February 10
Canada	2 (OT)
Switzerland	1
February 10
United States	3
Germany	0

Final
February 11
Canada	2
United States	1
Third place
February 11
Switzerland	1
Germany	2 (OT)

== Final rankings—World Championship ==
RF	Team
1	Canada
2	United States
3	Germany
4	Switzerland
5	Czechoslovakia
6	Hungary
7	Austria
8	Great Britain
9	Italy
10	Romania
11	France
12	Belgium

1934 World Champion
Canada

=== Team members ===
Pos.
1
Team
CAN
Roster
Tommy Dewar, Ab Welsh, Cooney Woods, Les Bird,

Ray Watkins, Jim Dewey, Ab Rogers, Bert Scharfe, Elmer Piper, Ron Silver, Cliff Lake, Hobb Wilson; Coach: Johnny Walker

== Final rankings—European Championship ==
RF	Team
1	Germany
2	Switzerland
3	Czechoslovakia
4	Hungary
5	Austria
6	Great Britain
7	Italy
8	Romania
9	France
10	Belgium

1934 European Champion
Germany
