= A & B High Performance Firearms =

- Industry: Defense
- Headquarters: Arvin, California, United States
- Products: Competition pistols

A & B High Performance Firearms was a competition pistol manufacturer. Products included the "Limited Class" and "Open Class" semi-automatic pistols, both available in .40 S&W and .45 ACP. A & B sold directly to consumers.
