= A-flat =

A-flat may refer to:

- A♭, a musical pitch
  - A scale based on A-flat:
    - A-flat major
    - A-flat minor
- A Flat (film), a 2010 Hindi film
- "A Flat", a song by Staind from Dysfunction

== See also ==
- Flat A
