= Abraham Salm (architect) =

Dutch architect

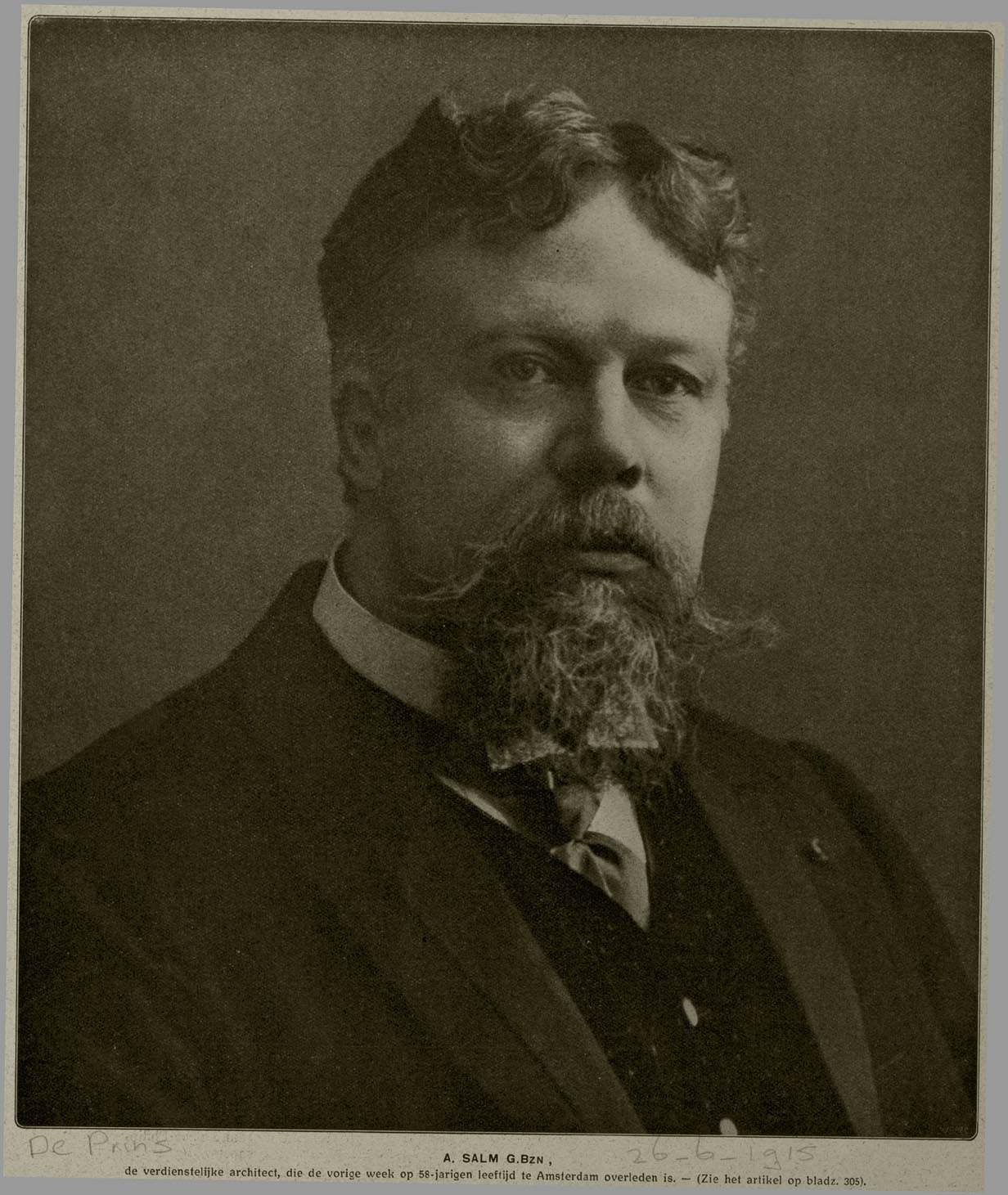
Abraham Salm

Abraham Salm (26 March 1857, Amsterdam - 13 June 1915, Amsterdam), was a Dutch architect.

== Biography ==
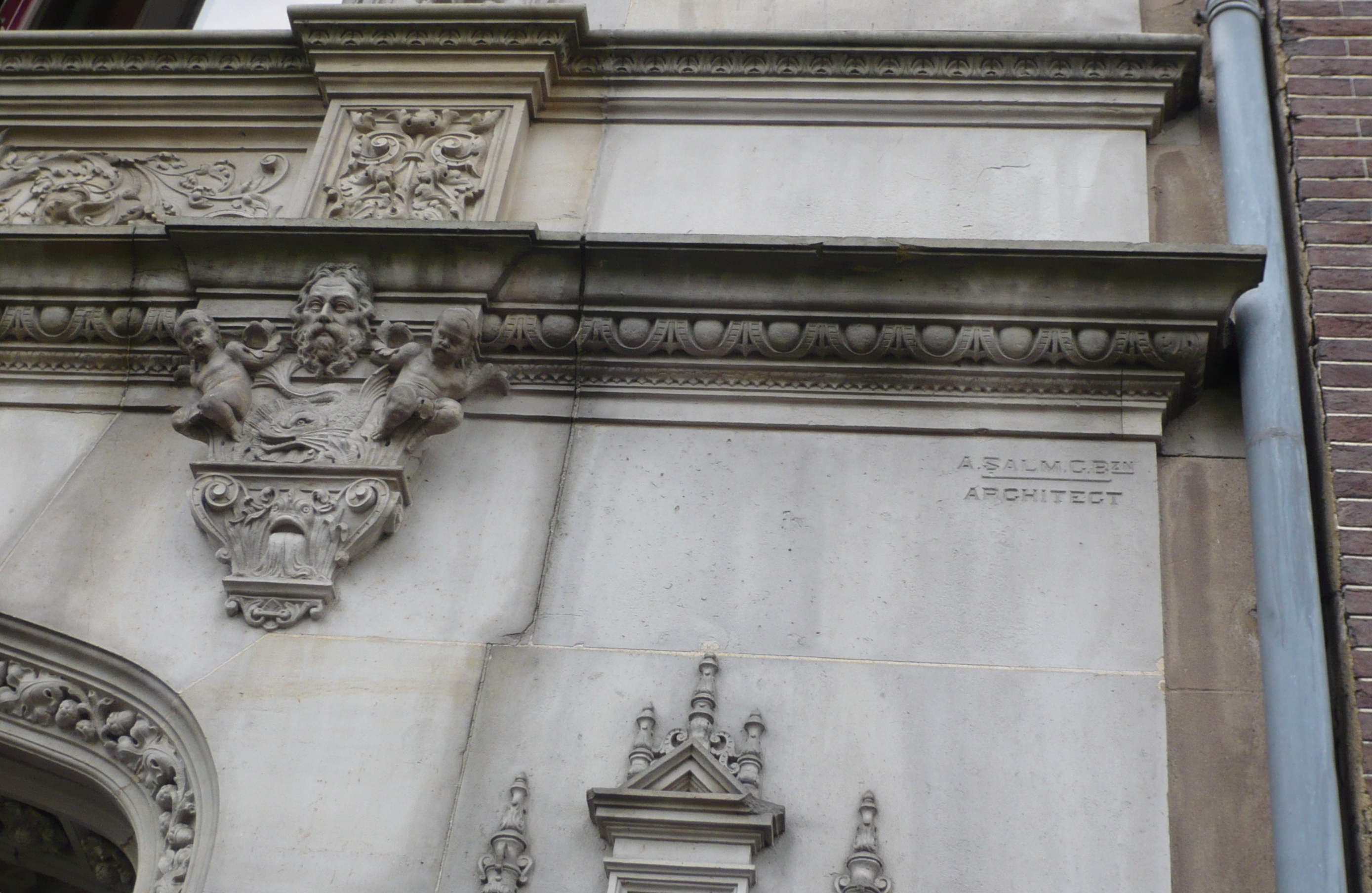
Amsterdam Herengracht 380–382, today the headquarters of the NIOD (library and center for war documentation). The building was designed and signed by Abraham Salm. On the right his signature: A. Salm GBzn Architect

He was born in Amsterdam as the son of the architect Gerlof Salm, whom he assisted. Together they visited the Exposition Universelle (1878) in Paris, and afterwards in 1880 he returned to Amsterdam where he became his father's partner. From 1898 to 1912 he was founding chairman of the Amsterdam architectural society Maatschappij tot Bevordering der Bouwkunst.
