= Legacy (journal) =

- Discipline: Women's writing
- Language: English
- Edited by: Susan Tomlinson

Publication details
- History: 1984–present
- Publisher: University of Nebraska Press
- Frequency: Biannually

Standard abbreviations
- ISO 4: Legacy

Indexing
- ISSN: 0748-4321 (print); 1534-0643 (web)

Legacy, A Journal of American Women Writers, is a scholarly journal that focuses on American women's writings from the 17th through the mid-20th century. It is the official journal of the Society for the Study of American Women Writers.

Each issue's articles cover a wide range of topics: examinations of the works of individual authors; genre studies; analyses of race, ethnicity, gender, class, and sexualities in women's literature; and historical and material cultural issues pertinent to women's lives and literary works. In addition, Legacy regularly publishes profiles of lesser-known or newly recovered authors, reprints of primary works in all genres, and book reviews covering current scholarship in the field.

Legacy is published twice a year by the University of Nebraska Press and is available online through Project MUSE or through university electronic journal websites.
