= Prairie Senior Hockey League =

Amateur ice hockey league in Canada

The Prairie Senior Hockey League was a senior amateur ice hockey league in the Canadian provinces of Alberta and Saskatchewan for the 1971-72 season.

== History ==
The league was formed by the merger of the Saskatchewan Senior Hockey League and the Alberta Senior Hockey League in 1971. It consisted of five teams, two from Alberta, the Calgary Stampeders and Edmonton Monarchs, and three from Saskatchewan, the Regina Caps, Saskatoon Quakers, and Yorkton Millers.

In December the Stampeders went on a tour of Europe. When they returned in January they disbanded because the team had no more money. The other Alberta team from Edmonton remained in the league. It was decided that the Monarchs would not enter the league playoffs but represent Alberta in the Allan Cup playoffs. The other three teams from Saskatchewan would play off among themselves to decide that province's representative.

The Saskatoon Quakers folded after the season ended. What was to be a semifinal series then became a final series between Regina and Yorkton.

== 1971-72 Standings ==
Standings	GP	W	L	T	GF	GA	Pts
Edmonton Monarchs	48	22	17	0	164	141	46
Saskatoon Quakers	42	24	16	2	199	169	45
Yorkton Millers	42	20	20	2	154	171	37
Calgary Stampeders	28	14	13	1	96	91	29
Regina Caps	39	12	26	1	161	202	25

== Final ==
- Yorkton Millers - Regina Caps 4:1 (4:2, 1:5, 3:1, 5:1, 6:5)

The Yorkton Millers advanced to the 1972 Western Canada Allan Cup Playoffs.
