= A/B sound system =

Type of public address system

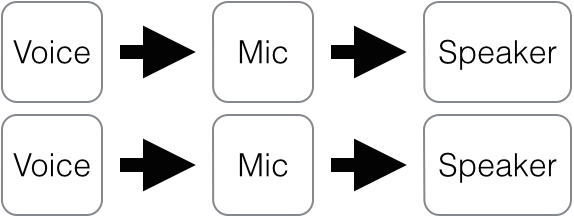
A depiction of an A/B Sound System

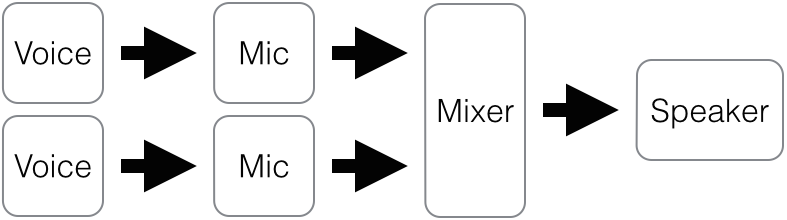
A depiction of a typical sound reinforcement system, for comparison

An A/B sound system is a type of sound reinforcement system or public address system. Unlike a more typical sound reinforcement system, an A/B sound system provides two electrically isolated signal paths from microphone to speaker, resulting in a system where signals from two microphones only interact acoustically and never interact electronically. This is accomplished by placing two separate loudspeakers at each speaker position and feeding the two speakers separate signals from separate microphones. The purported benefit of such a system is a reduction in phase cancellation and intermodulation distortion, and an improvement in speech intelligibility when two microphones are used simultaneously. A/B sound systems are unusual because they require double the speakers and therefore have double the cost.

== Origins ==
The development of the A/B sound system is credited to Martin Levan in 1988.

== Applications ==
Venues with A/B sound systems effectively have two separate sound systems which can be used simultaneously. Deciding what to do with such a system is generally an artistic rather than a technical decision, and so the decision is made by the sound designer.

An article describing an A/B system installed in the Helsinki City Theatre provides two potential uses for an A/B system: "One system provides the A mix of vocals, while the second system, in nearly the same position, provides the B mix of band and orchestra. The system is also useful when two singers are in close proximity, and placing them in different mixes can help avoid sonic anomalies caused by leakage between lavalier mics."

In an article describing the sound system for a touring opera, Michael Bodeen says, “I decided on an A/B vocal system, which would allow me to assign each child in the chorus to one of two matrixes. This made a complicated setup, but it helped reduce or eliminate the comb-filtering effect.”

An A/B system is used in the Avon Theatre at the Stratford Festival in Canada. Stratford Festival sound designer William Fallon said, "I've found that it has also helped in creating separation and clarity in large production numbers, by being able to send half the cast down one path and the other half down another, either based on parts, blocking, leads vs ensemble, etc."
