= Ab Salm =

Dutch painter

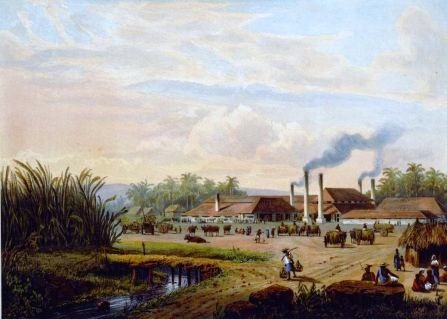
Sugar factory Pangka in Tagal, Java, Indonesia

Abram, or Ab Salm (29 October 1801, Amsterdam - 4 December 1876, Amsterdam) was a Dutch painter.

== Biography ==
He was born in Amsterdam and became a member of the Koninklijke Academie in 1833. He is known for landscapes. He spent 29 years in Indonesia and his views of Java were engraved by Johan Conrad Greive and published in Amsterdam in 1872.

He died in Amsterdam.
