= Saskatchewan Senior Hockey League =

The Saskatchewan Senior Hockey League (SSHL) was a senior amateur ice hockey league that operated in the Canadian province of Saskatchewan on-and-off from 1938 to 1971.

== History ==
Before the 1938–39 season there were Northern and Southern leagues in the province. They merged in 1938 to form the one provincial league. The championship team went on in the Allan Cup as Saskatchewan's representative. In 1941 the Regina Rangers won the SSHL's only Allan Cup title.

The league carried on through most of World War II but disbanded in 1944-45 because of a shortage of players and the difficulty of travelling. From the 1945–46 season through the 1949-50 season, senior teams in Regina and Saskatoon joined up with Calgary and Edmonton to form the Western Canada Senior Hockey League (WCSHL). The SSHL lay dormant until 1950 when the WCSHL moved up to the major level and competed for the Alexander Cup.

The SSHL was revived for 1950–51, again sending its champions to the Allan Cup playoffs, but only lasted until 1954–55. The Western Hockey League (WHL) operated in the province and the SSHL could not compete. It started up again in 1958-59 after the WHL left the province and operated until 1964–65. In 1965 the teams again merged with teams from Alberta to form a revived Western Canada Senior Hockey League. This new league lasted for two seasons when the teams again split on provincial lines.

The SSHL started up again in 1967-68 and lasted until 1971 when another merger formed the Prairie Senior Hockey League.

== Notable people ==
- Al Pickard, league president from 1940 to 1942, and again from 1951 to 1953.

== Champions ==
- 1938-39: Saskatoon Quakers
- 1939-40: Moose Jaw Millers
- 1940-41: Regina Rangers
- 1941-42: Saskatoon Quakers
- 1942-43: Regina Army Capitals
- 1943-44: Flin Flon Bombers
- 1944-1950 did not operate
- 1950-51: Yorkton Legion
- 1951-52: Melville Millionaires
- 1952-53: Regina Caps
- 1953-54: Moose Jaw Millers
- 1954-1958 did not operate
- 1958-59: Regina Caps
- 1959-60: Saskatoon Quakers
- 1960-61: Moose Jaw Pla-Mors
- 1961-62: Saskatoon Quakers
- 1962-63: Saskatoon Quakers
- 1963-64: Saskatoon Quakers
- 1964-65: Moose Jaw Pla-Mors
- 1965-1967 did not operate
- 1967-68: Yorkton Terriers
- 1968-69: Regina Caps
- 1969-70: Yorkton Terriers
- 1970-71: Yorkton Terriers

== See also ==
- Western Canada Senior Hockey League
- Western Canada Senior Hockey League (1965-1968)
- Prairie Senior Hockey League
