= A/b: Auto/Biography Studies =

Academic journal

a/b: Auto/Biography Studies
- Discipline: biographical scholarship, narrative analysis
- Language: English
- Edited by: Lisa Ortiz-Vilarelle

Publication details
- History: 1985–present
- Publisher: Routledge
- Frequency: Triannual
- Open access: Hybrid

Standard abbreviations
- ISO 4: a/b: Auto/Biogr. Stud.
- NLM: Autobiogr Stud

Indexing
- ISSN: 0898-9575 (print); 2151-7290 (web)
- LCCN: 91658655
- OCLC no.: 719444996

Links
- Journal homepage; Online access; Online archive

a/b: Auto/Biography Studies is a triannual peer-reviewed academic journal on biographical scholarship and narrative analysis, and is the official journal of The Autobiography Society. It is published on its behalf by Routledge. journal of The Autobiography Society. It publishes scholarly essays, reviews of academic books, essay clusters, and scholarly work on topics in life writing studies. The journal covers a range of life narrative practices, including autobiography, biography, biofiction, and autofiction. It does not publish personal essays, memoirs, or quantitative/empirical research.

The journal was established in 1985, following a conference on auto/biography studies hosted by James Olney. Its founding editors were Timothy Dow Adams, William L. Andrews, Joseph Hogan, Rebecca Hogan, and Barbara Sher. As of October 2025 the editor-in-chief is Lisa Ortiz-Vilarelle (The College of New Jersey).

Ruth Scurr, writing about autobiography studies in The Times Literary Supplement, described three journals in the field: a/b, Life Writing and Biography. Scurr characterizes a/b's spectrum of life writing studies as extending "beyond traditional conceptions of autobiography and biography to consider letters, diaries, scrapbooks, food memoirs and illness narratives, among other forms of testimony."

In June 2025 the journal published a special issue to celebrate its 40th anniversary, with articles reflecting on its origins and development. Volumes 24 (2009) through Vol. 28 (2013) are available on Project MUSE.

== Abstracting and indexing ==
The journal is abstracted and indexed in the MLA International Bibliography, International Bibliography of Periodical Literature, and Scopus.
