= Saskatoon Quakers =

Ice hockey team in Saskatoon, Saskatchewan (1930s–1970s)

- City: Saskatoon, Saskatchewan
- League: WCSHL (1945–1951); PCHL/WHL (1952–1959)
- Operated: (Professional); 1945–1956; 1957–1959
- Home arena: Saskatoon Arena

Franchise history
- 1945–1947: Saskatoon Elks
- 1948–1956: Saskatoon Quakers
- 1955–1957: Brandon Regals
- 1957–1958: Saskatoon/St. Paul Regals
- 1958–1959: Saskatoon Quakers

The Saskatoon Quakers were a Canadian ice hockey team based in Saskatoon, Saskatchewan. The team played in various senior and minor professional hockey leagues from the 1930s to the 1970s. The Quakers represented Canada and won gold at the 1934 World Hockey Championships held in Milan, Italy. In 1952, they captured the President's Cup as Pacific Coast Hockey League champions. The team was named for its sponsor, the Quaker Oats Company.

== History ==
=== Senior and minor professional ===
The Quakers represented Canada in the 1934 World Ice Hockey Championships in Milan, Italy. The team won the gold medal, defeating the United States in the championship final, avenging Canada's loss to the US in the 1933 championship final.

From 1937, the Quakers were based out of the 3,300-seat Saskatoon Arena in downtown Saskatoon. The Quakers were a founding member of the Western Canada Senior Hockey League (WCSHL) in 1945, where they were known their first two seasons as the Saskatoon Elks. They captured the WCSHL championship in 1950–51. The following season, the Quakers joined the Calgary Stampeders and Edmonton Flyers in turning professional as the WCSHL merged with the Pacific Coast Hockey League, which renamed itself the Western Hockey League in 1952. As a result of the merger, the Quakers lost their amateur status, becoming a minor-professional team. The Quakers succumbed, after five seasons in the WHL, to the increased costs of operating a minor-professional team.

When the Quakers won the WCSHL 1950–51 championship, they became the western league's representative to the 1951 Alexander Cup for the national major ('open' to both amateur and professional leagues) senior ice hockey championship of Canada. They would lose to the Toronto St. Michaels Monarchs in the Alexander Cup's semi-finals. In 1952, they captured the President's Cup as Pacific Coast Hockey League champions.

=== Brief second iteration ===
In 1957–58, Saskatoon returned to the WHL when the Brandon Regals, who had just won the league championship, moved and opted to split home games between Saskatoon and St. Paul, Minnesota as the Saskatoon/St. Paul Regals. The two city concept last just one season, and in 1958–59, the team hosted games only in Saskatoon and adopted the name of the former Quakers. They would last only one more season before folding.

== Season-by-season record ==
= Denotes Minor Professional status

Note: GP = Games played, W = Wins, L = Losses, T = Ties Pts = Points, GF = Goals for, GA = Goals against

=== Original iteration ===
Team	Season	League	GP	W	L	T	GF	GA	Points	Finish	Playoffs
Saskatoon Elks	1945–46	WCSHL	36	14	19	2	104	147	30	3rd Overall	
Saskatoon Elks	1946–47	WCSHL	40	15	23	2	151	210	32	4th Overall	
Saskatoon Quakers	1947–48	WCSHL	48	19	27	2	187	239	40	5th Overall	
Saskatoon Quakers	1948–49	WCSHL	48	8	38	2	144	307	18	5th Overall	
Saskatoon Quakers	1949–50	WCSHL	50	24	25	1	190	227	49	3rd Overall	
Saskatoon Quakers	1950–51	WCSHL	59	31	27	1	246	234	63	3rd Overall	Won league
Saskatoon Quakers	1951–52	PCHL	70	35	21	14	273	225	84	2nd Overall	Won championship
Saskatoon Quakers	1952–53	WHL	70	35	26	9	268	240	79	1st Overall	
Saskatoon Quakers	1953–54	WHL	70	32	29	9	226	214	73	3rd Overall	
Saskatoon Quakers	1954–55	WHL	70	19	41	11	207	273	49	6th Overall	
Saskatoon Quakers	1955–56	WHL	70	27	35	8	208	249	2	3rd Prairie	

=== Second iteration ===
Team	Season	League	GP	W	L	T	GF	GA	Points	Finish	Playoffs
Brandon Regals	1956–57	WHL	70	44	22	4	250	186	92	1st Overall	Won championship
Saskatoon/St. Paul Regals	1957-58	WHL	70	25	45	0	214	323	50	4th Prairie	
Saskatoon Quakers	1958–59	WHL	64	29	31	4	208	201	62	4th Prairie	

== See also ==
- Ice hockey in Saskatchewan
- List of ice hockey teams in Saskatchewan
