= List of alpine skiing world champions =

The FIS Alpine World Ski Championships are organized by the International Ski Federation (FIS).

== History ==
The first world championships in alpine skiing were held in 1931. It consisted of downhill and slalom events for men and women. Next year the combined event was added to the program as a "paper" race which used the results of the downhill and slalom. During the 1930s, the competition was held annually in Europe, until interrupted by the outbreak of World War II, preventing a 1940 event. An event was held in 1941, but included competitors only from nations from the Axis powers or nations not at war with them. The results were later cancelled by the FIS in 1946 because of the limited number of participants, so they are not considered official.

Following the war, the championships were connected with the Olympics for several decades. From 1948 through 1982, the competition was held in even-numbered years, with the Winter Olympics acting as the World Championships through 1980, and a separate competition held in even-numbered non-Olympic years. The 1950 championships in the United States at Aspen were the first held outside of Europe and the first official championships separate of the Olympics since 1939.

The combined event was dropped after 1948 with the addition of the giant slalom in 1950, but returned in 1954 as a "paper" race which used the results of the three events: downhill, giant slalom, and slalom. During Olympic years from 1956 through 1980, FIS World Championship medals were awarded in the combined, but not Olympic medals. The combined returned as a separately run event in 1982 with its own downhill and two-run slalom, and the Super-G was added to the program in 1987 (both disciplines were also added to the Olympics in 1988).

There were no World Championships in 1983 or 1984 and since 1985, they have been scheduled in odd-numbered years, independent of the Winter Olympics. A lack of snow in southern Spain in 1995 caused a postponement to the following year.

The mixed nations team event was added to the program in 2005. Since 2007, the combined event switched to the new "super combined" format (one run each of downhill and slalom instead of one-run downhill and two-run slalom). The parallel giant slalom was added to the program in 2021. In 2025, the individual combined event was replaced with team combined event (which involve two-person national teams assigned to downhill and slalom respectively) and the parallel giant slalom was dropped from the World Championships.

== Men's champions ==
| Year | Location | Downhill | Slalom | Combined / Team combined | Giant slalom | Super-G | Parallel giant slalom |
| 1931 | (Switzerland) Mürren | (Switzerland) Walter Prager | (Switzerland) David Zogg | n/a | n/a | n/a | n/a |
| 1932 | (Italy) Cortina | (Austria) Gustav Lantschner | (Weimar Republic) Friedl Däuber | (Switzerland) Otto Furrer | n/a | n/a | n/a |
| 1933 | (Austria) Innsbruck | (Switzerland) Walter Prager (2) | (Austria) Toni Seelos | (Austria) Toni Seelos | n/a | n/a | n/a |
| 1934 | (Switzerland) St. Moritz | (Switzerland) David Zogg | (Nazi Germany) Franz Pfnür | (Switzerland) David Zogg | n/a | n/a | n/a |
| 1935 | (Switzerland) Mürren | (Austria) Franz Zingerle | (Austria) Toni Seelos (2) | (Austria) Toni Seelos (2) | n/a | n/a | n/a |
| 1936 | (Austria) Innsbruck | (Switzerland) Rudolf Rominger | (Austria) Rudolph Matt | (Switzerland) Rudolf Rominger | n/a | n/a | n/a |
| 1937 | (France) Chamonix | (France) Émile Allais | (France) Émile Allais | (France) Émile Allais | n/a | n/a | n/a |
| 1938 | (Switzerland) Engelberg | (France) James Couttet | (Switzerland) Rudolf Rominger | (France) Émile Allais (2) | n/a | n/a | n/a |
| 1939 | (Second Polish Republic) Zakopane | (Nazi Germany) Hellmut Lantschner | (Switzerland) Rudolf Rominger (2) | (Nazi Germany) Josef Jennewein | n/a | n/a | n/a |
| 1941 | (Italy) Cortina | Competitions derecognized by the FIS in 1946 due to the limited number of participants during wartime. | | | | | |
| 1948 | (Switzerland) St. Moritz | (France) Henri Oreiller | (Switzerland) Edy Reinalter | (France) Henri Oreiller | n/a | n/a | n/a |
| 1950 | (United States) Aspen | (Italy) Zeno Colò | (Switzerland) Georges Schneider | n/a | (Italy) Zeno Colò | n/a | n/a |
| 1952 | (Norway) Oslo | (Italy) Zeno Colò (2) | (Austria) Othmar Schneider | n/a | (Norway) Stein Eriksen | n/a | n/a |
| 1954 | (Sweden) Åre | (Austria) Christian Pravda | (Norway) Stein Eriksen | (Norway) Stein Eriksen | (Norway) Stein Eriksen (2) | n/a | n/a |
| 1956 | (Italy) Cortina | (Austria) Toni Sailer | (Austria) Toni Sailer | (Austria) Toni Sailer | (Austria) Toni Sailer | n/a | n/a |
| 1958 | (Austria) Bad Gastein | (Austria) Toni Sailer (2) | (Austria) Josl Rieder | (Austria) Toni Sailer (2) | (Austria) Toni Sailer (2) | n/a | n/a |
| 1960 | (United States) Squaw Valley | (France) Jean Vuarnet | (Austria) Ernst Hinterseer | (France) Guy Périllat | (Switzerland) Roger Staub | n/a | n/a |
| 1962 | (France) Chamonix | (Austria) Karl Schranz | (France) Charles Bozon | (Austria) Karl Schranz | (Austria) Egon Zimmermann | n/a | n/a |
| 1964 | (Austria) Innsbruck | (Austria) Egon Zimmermann | (Austria) Josef Stiegler | (Germany) Ludwig Leitner | (France) François Bonlieu | n/a | n/a |
| 1966 | (Chile) Portillo | (France) Jean-Claude Killy | (Italy) Carlo Senoner | (France) Jean-Claude Killy | (France) Guy Périllat | n/a | n/a |
| 1968 | (France) Grenoble | (France) Jean-Claude Killy (2) | (France) Jean-Claude Killy | (France) Jean-Claude Killy (2) | (France) Jean-Claude Killy | n/a | n/a |
| 1970 | (Italy) Val Gardena | (Switzerland) Bernhard Russi | (France) Jean-Noël Augert | (United States) Billy Kidd | (Austria) Karl Schranz | n/a | n/a |
| 1972 | (Japan) Sapporo | (Switzerland) Bernhard Russi (2) | (Spain) Francisco Fernández Ochoa | (Italy) Gustav Thöni | (Italy) Gustav Thöni | n/a | n/a |
| 1974 | (Switzerland) St. Moritz | (Austria) David Zwilling | (Italy) Gustav Thöni | (Austria) Franz Klammer | (Italy) Gustav Thöni (2) | n/a | n/a |
| 1976 | (Austria) Innsbruck | (Austria) Franz Klammer | (Italy) Piero Gros | (Italy) Gustav Thöni (2) | (Switzerland) Heini Hemmi | n/a | n/a |
| 1978 | (West Germany) Garmisch-Partenkirchen | (Austria) Josef Walcher | (Sweden) Ingemar Stenmark | (Liechtenstein) Andreas Wenzel | (Sweden) Ingemar Stenmark | n/a | n/a |
| 1980 | (United States) Lake Placid | (Austria) Leonhard Stock | (Sweden) Ingemar Stenmark (2) | (United States) Phil Mahre | (Sweden) Ingemar Stenmark (2) | n/a | n/a |
| 1982 | (Austria) Schladming | (Austria) Harti Weirather | (Sweden) Ingemar Stenmark (3) | (France) Michel Vion | (United States) Steve Mahre | n/a | n/a |
| 1985 | (Italy) Bormio | (Switzerland) Pirmin Zurbriggen | (Sweden) Jonas Nilsson | (Switzerland) Pirmin Zurbriggen | (West Germany) Markus Wasmeier | n/a | n/a |
| 1987 | (Switzerland) Crans-Montana | (Switzerland) Peter Müller | (West Germany) Frank Wörndl | (Luxembourg) Marc Girardelli | (Switzerland) Pirmin Zurbriggen | (Switzerland) Pirmin Zurbriggen | n/a |
| 1989 | (United States) Vail | (West Germany) Hans-Jörg Tauscher | (Austria) Rudolf Nierlich | (Luxembourg) Marc Girardelli (2) | (Austria) Rudolf Nierlich | (Switzerland) Martin Hangl | n/a |
| 1991 | (Austria) Saalbach | (Switzerland) Franz Heinzer | (Luxembourg) Marc Girardelli | (Austria) Stephan Eberharter | (Austria) Rudolf Nierlich (2) | (Austria) Stephan Eberharter | n/a |
| 1993 | (Japan) Morioka | (Switzerland) Urs Lehmann | (Norway) Kjetil André Aamodt | (Norway) Lasse Kjus | (Norway) Kjetil André Aamodt | Cancelled | n/a |
| 1996 | (Spain) Sierra Nevada | (Austria) Patrick Ortlieb | (Italy) Alberto Tomba | (Luxembourg) Marc Girardelli (3) | (Italy) Alberto Tomba | (Norway) Atle Skårdal | n/a |
| 1997 | (Italy) Sestriere | (Switzerland) Bruno Kernen | (Norway) Tom Stiansen | (Norway) Kjetil André Aamodt | (Switzerland) Michael von Grünigen | (Norway) Atle Skårdal (2) | n/a |
| 1999 | (United States) Vail/Beaver Creek | (Austria) Hermann Maier | (Finland) Kalle Palander | (Norway) Kjetil André Aamodt (2) | (Norway) Lasse Kjus | (Norway) Lasse Kjus (Austria) Hermann Maier | n/a |
| 2001 | (Austria) St. Anton | (Austria) Hannes Trinkl | (Austria) Mario Matt | (Norway) Kjetil André Aamodt (3) | (Switzerland) Michael von Grünigen (2) | (United States) Daron Rahlves | n/a |
| 2003 | (Switzerland) St. Moritz | (Austria) Michael Walchhofer | (Croatia) Ivica Kostelić | (United States) Bode Miller | (United States) Bode Miller | (Austria) Stephan Eberharter (2) | n/a |
| 2005 | (Italy) Bormio | (United States) Bode Miller | (Austria) Benjamin Raich | (Austria) Benjamin Raich | (Austria) Hermann Maier | (United States) Bode Miller | n/a |
| 2007 | (Sweden) Åre | (Norway) Aksel Lund Svindal | (Austria) Mario Matt (2) | (Switzerland) Daniel Albrecht | (Norway) Aksel Lund Svindal | (Italy) Patrick Staudacher | n/a |
| 2009 | (France) Val d'Isère | (Canada) John Kucera | (Austria) Manfred Pranger | (Norway) Aksel Lund Svindal | (Switzerland) Carlo Janka | (Switzerland) Didier Cuche | n/a |
| 2011 | (Germany) Garmisch-Partenkirchen | (Canada) Erik Guay | (France) Jean-Baptiste Grange | (Norway) Aksel Lund Svindal (2) | (United States) Ted Ligety | (Italy) Christof Innerhofer | n/a |
| 2013 | (Austria) Schladming | (Norway) Aksel Lund Svindal (2) | (Austria) Marcel Hirscher | (United States) Ted Ligety | (United States) Ted Ligety (2) | (United States) Ted Ligety | n/a |
| 2015 | (United States) Vail/Beaver Creek | (Switzerland) Patrick Küng | (France) Jean-Baptiste Grange (2) | (Austria) Marcel Hirscher | (United States) Ted Ligety (3) | (Austria) Hannes Reichelt | n/a |
| 2017 | (Switzerland) St. Moritz | (Switzerland) Beat Feuz | (Austria) Marcel Hirscher (2) | (Switzerland) Luca Aerni | (Austria) Marcel Hirscher | (Canada) Erik Guay | n/a |
| 2019 | (Sweden) Åre | (Norway) Kjetil Jansrud | (Austria) Marcel Hirscher (3) | (France) Alexis Pinturault | (Norway) Henrik Kristoffersen | (Italy) Dominik Paris | n/a |
| 2021 | (Italy) Cortina | (Austria) Vincent Kriechmayr | (Norway) Sebastian Foss-Solevåg | (Austria) Marco Schwarz | (France) Mathieu Faivre | (Austria) Vincent Kriechmayr | (France) Mathieu Faivre |
| 2023 | (France) Courchevel-Méribel | (Switzerland) Marco Odermatt | (Norway) Henrik Kristoffersen | (France) Alexis Pinturault (2) | (Switzerland) Marco Odermatt | (Canada) James Crawford | (Germany) Alexander Schmid |
| 2025 | (Austria) Saalbach | (Switzerland) Franjo von Allmen | (Switzerland) Loïc Meillard | (Switzerland) Franjo von Allmen and Loïc Meillard | (Austria) Raphael Haaser | (Switzerland) Marco Odermatt | n/a |

- Held as part of the Winter Olympics (9).

=== Titles by nation ===
| Rank | Nation | Total | Downhill | Slalom | Combined | Giant slalom | Super-G | Parallel giant slalom | Team combined |
|---|---|---|---|---|---|---|---|---|---|
| 1 | Austria | 57 | 17 | 16 | 10 | 9 | 5 | — | — |
| 2 | Switzerland | 39 | 15 | 6 | 6 | 7 | 4 | — | 1 |
| 3 | France | 26 | 6 | 6 | 9 | 4 | — | 1 | — |
| 4 | Norway | 24 | 3 | 5 | 7 | 6 | 3 | — | — |
| 5 | Italy | 15 | 2 | 4 | 2 | 4 | 3 | — | — |
| 6 | United States | 13 | 1 | — | 4 | 5 | 3 | — | — |
| 7 | Germany | 9 | 2 | 3 | 2 | 1 | — | 1 | — |
| 8 | Sweden | 6 | — | 4 | — | 2 | — | — | — |
| 9 | Canada | 4 | 2 | — | — | — | 2 | — | — |
| 9 | Luxembourg | 4 | — | 1 | 3 | — | — | — | — |
| 11 | Croatia | 1 | — | 1 | — | — | — | — | — |
| 11 | Finland | 1 | — | 1 | — | — | — | — | — |
| 11 | Liechtenstein | 1 | — | — | 1 | — | — | — | — |
| 11 | Spain | 1 | — | 1 | — | — | — | — | — |

== Women's champions ==
| Year | Location | Downhill | Slalom | Combined / Team combined | Giant slalom | Super-G | Parallel giant slalom |
| 1931 | (Switzerland) Mürren | (United Kingdom) Esme Mackinnon | (United Kingdom) Esme Mackinnon | n/a | n/a | n/a | n/a |
| 1932 | (Italy) Cortina | (Italy) Paula Wiesinger | (Switzerland) Rösli Streiff | (Switzerland) Rösli Streiff | n/a | n/a | n/a |
| 1933 | (Austria) Innsbruck | (Austria) Inge Wersin-Lantschner | (Austria) Inge Wersin-Lantschner | (Austria) Inge Wersin-Lantschner | n/a | n/a | n/a |
| 1934 | (Switzerland) St. Moritz | (Switzerland) Anny Rüegg | (Nazi Germany) Christl Cranz | (Nazi Germany) Christl Cranz | n/a | n/a | n/a |
| 1935 | (Switzerland) Mürren | (Nazi Germany) Christl Cranz | (Switzerland) Anny Rüegg | (Nazi Germany) Christl Cranz (2) | n/a | n/a | n/a |
| 1936 | (Austria) Innsbruck | (United Kingdom) Evelyn Pinching | (Austria) Gerda Paumgarten | (United Kingdom) Evelyn Pinching | n/a | n/a | n/a |
| 1937 | (France) Chamonix | (Nazi Germany) Christl Cranz (2) | (Nazi Germany) Christl Cranz (2) | (Nazi Germany) Christl Cranz (3) | n/a | n/a | n/a |
| 1938 | (Switzerland) Engelberg | (Nazi Germany) Lisa Resch | (Nazi Germany) Christl Cranz (3) | (Nazi Germany) Christl Cranz (4) | n/a | n/a | n/a |
| 1939 | (Poland) Zakopane | (Nazi Germany) Christl Cranz (3) | (Nazi Germany) Christl Cranz (4) | (Nazi Germany) Christl Cranz (5) | n/a | n/a | n/a |
| 1941 | (Italy) Cortina | Competitions derecognized by the FIS in 1946 due to the limited number of participants during wartime. | | | | | |
| 1948 | (Switzerland) St. Moritz | (Switzerland) Hedy Schlunegger | (United States) Gretchen Fraser | (Austria) Trude Beiser | n/a | n/a | n/a |
| 1950 | (United States) Aspen | (Austria) Trude Jochum-Beiser | (Austria) Dagmar Rom | n/a | (Austria) Dagmar Rom | n/a | n/a |
| 1952 | (Norway) Oslo | (Austria) Trude Jochum-Beiser (2) | (United States) Andrea Mead Lawrence | n/a | (United States) Andrea Mead Lawrence | n/a | n/a |
| 1954 | (Sweden) Åre | (Switzerland) Ida Schöpfer | (Austria) Trude Klecker | (Switzerland) Ida Schöpfer | (France) Lucienne Schmith | n/a | n/a |
| 1956 | (Italy) Cortina | (Switzerland) Madeleine Berthod | (Switzerland) Renée Colliard | (Switzerland) Madeleine Berthod | (Germany) Ossi Reichert | n/a | n/a |
| 1958 | (Austria) Bad Gastein | (Canada) Lucile Wheeler | (Norway) Inger Bjørnbakken | (Switzerland) Frieda Dänzer | (Canada) Lucile Wheeler | n/a | n/a |
| 1960 | (United States) Squaw Valley | (Germany) Heidi Biebl | (Canada) Anne Heggtveit | (Canada) Anne Heggtveit | (Switzerland) Yvonne Rüegg | n/a | n/a |
| 1962 | (France) Chamonix | (Austria) Christl Haas | (Austria) Marianne Jahn | (France) Marielle Goitschel | (Austria) Marianne Jahn | n/a | n/a |
| 1964 | (Austria) Innsbruck | (Austria) Christl Haas (2) | (France) Christine Goitschel | (France) Marielle Goitschel (2) | (France) Marielle Goitschel | n/a | n/a |
| 1966 | (Chile) Portillo | (France) Marielle Goitschel | (France) Annie Famose | (France) Marielle Goitschel (3) | (France) Marielle Goitschel (2) | n/a | n/a |
| 1968 | (France) Grenoble | (Austria) Olga Pall | (France) Marielle Goitschel | (Canada) Nancy Greene | (Canada) Nancy Greene | n/a | n/a |
| 1970 | (Italy) Val Gardena | (Switzerland) Annerösli Zryd | (France) Ingrid Lafforgue | (France) Michèle Jacot | (Canada) Betsy Clifford | n/a | n/a |
| 1972 | (Japan) Sapporo | (Switzerland) Marie-Theres Nadig | (United States) Barbara Cochran | (Austria) Annemarie Pröll | (Switzerland) Marie-Theres Nadig | n/a | n/a |
| 1974 | (Switzerland) St. Moritz | (Austria) Annemarie Moser-Pröll | (Liechtenstein) Hanni Wenzel | (France) Fabienne Serrat | (France) Fabienne Serrat | n/a | n/a |
| 1976 | (Austria) Innsbruck | (West Germany) Rosi Mittermaier | (West Germany) Rosi Mittermaier | (West Germany) Rosi Mittermaier | (Canada) Kathy Kreiner | n/a | n/a |
| 1978 | (West Germany) Garmisch-Partenkirchen | (Austria) Annemarie Moser-Pröll (2) | (Austria) Lea Sölkner | (Austria) Annemarie Moser-Pröll (2) | (West Germany) Maria Epple | n/a | n/a |
| 1980 | (United States) Lake Placid | (Austria) Annemarie Moser-Pröll (3) | (Liechtenstein) Hanni Wenzel (2) | (Liechtenstein) Hanni Wenzel | (Liechtenstein) Hanni Wenzel | n/a | n/a |
| 1982 | (Austria) Haus im Ennstal | (Canada) Gerry Sorensen | (Switzerland) Erika Hess | (Switzerland) Erika Hess | (Switzerland) Erika Hess | n/a | n/a |
| 1985 | (Italy) Bormio | (Switzerland) Michela Figini | (France) Perrine Pelen | (Switzerland) Erika Hess (2) | (United States) Diann Roffe | n/a | n/a |
| 1987 | (Switzerland) Crans-Montana | (Switzerland) Maria Walliser | (Switzerland) Erika Hess (2) | (Switzerland) Erika Hess (3) | (Switzerland) Vreni Schneider | (Switzerland) Maria Walliser | n/a |
| 1989 | (United States) Vail | (Switzerland) Maria Walliser (2) | (Socialist Federal Republic of Yugoslavia) Mateja Svet | (United States) Tamara McKinney | (Switzerland) Vreni Schneider (2) | (Austria) Ulrike Maier | n/a |
| 1991 | (Austria) Saalbach | (Austria) Petra Kronberger | (Switzerland) Vreni Schneider | (Switzerland) Chantal Bournissen | (Sweden) Pernilla Wiberg | (Austria) Ulrike Maier (2) | n/a |
| 1993 | (Japan) Morioka | (Canada) Kate Pace | (Austria) Karin Buder | (Germany) Miriam Vogt | (France) Carole Merle | (Germany) Katja Seizinger | n/a |
| 1996 | (Spain) Sierra Nevada | (United States) Picabo Street | (Sweden) Pernilla Wiberg | (Sweden) Pernilla Wiberg | (Italy) Deborah Compagnoni | (Italy) Isolde Kostner | n/a |
| 1997 | (Italy) Sestriere | (United States) Hilary Lindh | (Italy) Deborah Compagnoni | (Austria) Renate Götschl | (Italy) Deborah Compagnoni (2) | (Italy) Isolde Kostner (2) | n/a |
| 1999 | (United States) Vail/Beaver Creek | (Austria) Renate Götschl | (Australia) Zali Steggall | (Sweden) Pernilla Wiberg (2) | (Austria) Alexandra Meissnitzer | (Austria) Alexandra Meissnitzer | n/a |
| 2001 | (Austria) St. Anton | (Austria) Michaela Dorfmeister | (Sweden) Anja Pärson | (Germany) Martina Ertl | (Switzerland) Sonja Nef | (France) Régine Cavagnoud | n/a |
| 2003 | (Switzerland) St. Moritz | (Canada) Mélanie Turgeon | (Croatia) Janica Kostelić | (Croatia) Janica Kostelić | (Sweden) Anja Pärson | (Austria) Michaela Dorfmeister | n/a |
| 2005 | (Italy) Bormio | (Croatia) Janica Kostelić | (Croatia) Janica Kostelić (2) | (Croatia) Janica Kostelić (2) | (Sweden) Anja Pärson (2) | (Sweden) Anja Pärson | n/a |
| 2007 | (Sweden) Åre | (Sweden) Anja Pärson | (Czech Republic) Šárka Záhrobská | (Sweden) Anja Pärson | (Austria) Nicole Hosp | (Sweden) Anja Pärson (2) | n/a |
| 2009 | (France) Val d'Isère | (United States) Lindsey Vonn | (Germany) Maria Riesch | (Austria) Kathrin Zettel | (Germany) Kathrin Hölzl | (United States) Lindsey Vonn | n/a |
| 2011 | (Germany) Garmisch-Partenkirchen | (Austria) Elisabeth Görgl | (Austria) Marlies Schild | (Austria) Anna Fenninger | (Slovenia) Tina Maze | (Austria) Elisabeth Görgl | n/a |
| 2013 | (Austria) Schladming | (France) Marion Rolland | (United States) Mikaela Shiffrin | (Germany) Maria Höfl-Riesch | (France) Tessa Worley | (Slovenia) Tina Maze | n/a |
| 2015 | (United States) Vail/Beaver Creek | (Slovenia) Tina Maze | (United States) Mikaela Shiffrin (2) | (Slovenia) Tina Maze | (Austria) Anna Fenninger | (Austria) Anna Fenninger | n/a |
| 2017 | (Switzerland) St. Moritz | (Slovenia) Ilka Štuhec | (United States) Mikaela Shiffrin (3) | (Switzerland) Wendy Holdener | (France) Tessa Worley (2) | (Austria) Nicole Schmidhofer | n/a |
| 2019 | (Sweden) Åre | (Slovenia) Ilka Štuhec (2) | (United States) Mikaela Shiffrin (4) | (Switzerland) Wendy Holdener (2) | (Slovakia) Petra Vlhová | (United States) Mikaela Shiffrin | n/a |
| 2021 | (Italy) Cortina | (Switzerland) Corinne Suter | (Austria) Katharina Liensberger | (United States) Mikaela Shiffrin | (Switzerland) Lara Gut-Behrami | (Switzerland) Lara Gut-Behrami | (Italy) Marta Bassino (Austria) Katharina Liensberger |
| 2023 | (France) Courchevel-Méribel | (Switzerland) Jasmine Flury | (Canada) Laurence St. Germain | (Italy) Federica Brignone | (United States) Mikaela Shiffrin | (Italy) Marta Bassino | (Norway) Maria Therese Tviberg |
| 2025 | (Austria) Saalbach | (United States) Breezy Johnson | (Switzerland) Camille Rast | (United States) Breezy Johnson and Mikaela Shiffrin | (Italy) Federica Brignone | (Austria) Stephanie Venier | n/a |

- Held as part of the Winter Olympics (9).

=== Titles by nation ===
| Rank | Nation | Total | Downhill | Slalom | Combined | Giant slalom | Super-G | Parallel giant slalom | Team combined |
|---|---|---|---|---|---|---|---|---|---|
| 1 | Austria | 43 | 13 | 9 | 7 | 5 | 8 | 1 | — |
| 2 | Switzerland | 37 | 11 | 7 | 10 | 7 | 2 | — | — |
| 3 | Germany | 25 | 6 | 6 | 9 | 3 | 1 | — | — |
| 4 | France | 20 | 2 | 5 | 5 | 7 | 1 | — | — |
| 5 | United States | 19 | 4 | 7 | 2 | 3 | 2 | — | 1 |
| 6 | Canada | 12 | 4 | 2 | 2 | 4 | — | — | — |
| 7 | Sweden | 11 | 1 | 2 | 3 | 3 | 2 | — | — |
| 8 | Italy | 10 | 1 | 1 | 1 | 3 | 3 | 1 | — |
| 9 | Slovenia | 6 | 3 | — | 1 | 1 | 1 | — | — |
| 10 | Croatia | 5 | 1 | 2 | 2 | — | — | — | — |
| 11 | Great Britain | 4 | 2 | 1 | 1 | — | — | — | — |
| 11 | Liechtenstein | 4 | — | 2 | 1 | 1 | — | — | — |
| 13 | Norway | 2 | — | 1 | — | — | — | 1 | — |
| 14 | Australia | 1 | — | 1 | — | — | — | — | — |
| 14 | Czech Republic | 1 | — | 1 | — | — | — | — | — |
| 14 | Slovakia | 1 | — | — | — | 1 | — | — | — |
| 14 | Yugoslavia | 1 | — | 1 | — | — | — | — | — |

== Nations team event ==
| Year | Location | Champion |
|---|---|---|
| 2005 | (Italy) Bormio | Germany; Monika Bergmann-Schmuderer; Florian Eckert; Andreas Ertl; Martina Ertl; Hilde Gerg; Felix Neureuther |
| 2007 | (Sweden) Åre | Austria; Renate Götschl; Michaela Kirchgasser; Mario Matt; Benjamin Raich; Marlies Schild; Fritz Strobl |
| 2009 | (France) Val d'Isère | Cancelled |
| 2011 | (Germany) Garmisch-Partenkirchen | France; Taïna Barioz; Gauthier de Tessières * Thomas Fanara; Anémone Marmottan; Cyprien Richard; Tessa Worley |
| 2013 | (Austria) Schladming | Austria (2); Nicole Hosp; Marcel Hirscher; Michaela Kirchgasser; Marcel Mathis * Philipp Schörghofer; Carmen Thalmann |
| 2015 | (United States) Vail/Beaver Creek | Austria (3); Eva-Maria Brem; Marcel Hirscher; Nicole Hosp * Michaela Kirchgasser; Christoph Nösig; Philipp Schörghofer * |
| 2017 | (Switzerland) St. Moritz | France (2); Adeline Baud Mugnier; Mathieu Faivre; Julien Lizeroux * Nastasia Noens * Alexis Pinturault; Tessa Worley |
| 2019 | (Sweden) Åre | Switzerland; Aline Danioth; Andrea Ellenberger * Wendy Holdener; Sandro Simonet * Daniel Yule; Ramon Zenhäusern |
| 2021 | (Italy) Cortina | Norway; Sebastian Foss-Solevåg; Kristin Lysdahl * Kristina Riis-Johannessen; Fabian Wilkens Solheim; Thea Louise Stjernesund |
| 2023 | (France) Courchevel-Méribel | United States; Tommy Ford; Katie Hensien * Paula Moltzan; Nina O'Brien; River Radamus; Luke Winters * |
| 2025 | (Austria) Saalbach | Italy; Giorgia Collomb; Lara Della Mea; Filippo Della Vite; Alex Vinatzer |

* won gold medals as reserve skiers

== See also ==
- List of Olympic medalists in alpine skiing
