= 1938 in sports =

1938 in sports describes the year's events in world sport.

== Alpine skiing ==
FIS Alpine World Ski Championships 8th FIS Alpine World Ski Championships are held at Engelberg, Switzerland. The events are a downhill, a slalom and a combined race in both the men's and women's categories. The winners are:

- Men's downhill – James Couttet (France)
- Men's slalom – Rudolf Rominger (Switzerland)
- Men's combined – Emile Allais (France)
- Women's downhill – Lisa Resch (Germany)
- Women's slalom – Christl Cranz (Germany)
- Women's combined – Christl Cranz (Germany)

== American football ==
- NFL Championship – the New York Giants won 23–17 over the Green Bay Packers at the Polo Grounds
- First High School Oil Bowl is played.

== Association football ==
World Cup

- 1938 World Cup held in France – Italy retain their title, beating Hungary 4–2 in the final.

England

- First Division – Arsenal win the 1937–38 title
- FA Cup – Preston North End beat Huddersfield Town 1-0

Spain

- La Liga – not contested due to the Spanish Civil War

Germany

- German football championship won by Hannover 96

Italy

- Serie A won by Ambrosiana-Inter

Portugal

- Primeira Liga won by S.L. Benfica

France

- French Division 1 won by Sochaux-Montbéliard

Scotland

- First Division won by Celtic for the 21st time
- 27 April, Scottish Cup won by East Fife who beat Kilmarnock 4-2 in a replay after their initial match ended in a 1-1 draw

== Athletics ==
- March 3 – Glenn Cunningham breaks the world record for the indoor mile run by completing the distance in 4 minutes, 4.4 seconds.
- September 4 – European Championships Marathon at Paris is won by Väinö Muinonen (Finland) in a time of 2:37:29

== Australian rules football ==
- The Victorian Football Association legalized throwing the ball in general play, establishing its own code of Australian rules football which was distinct from the national code administered by the Australian National Football Council. It was the beginning of a decade-long schism which ran from 1938 until 1949.
- Victorian Football League
  - 24 September – Carlton wins the 42nd VFL Premiership, defeating Collingwood 15.10 (100) to 13.7 (85) in the 1938 VFL Grand Final
  - Brownlow Medal awarded to Dick Reynolds (Essendon)
- South Australian National Football League
  - 1 October – South Adelaide 23.14 (152) defeat Port Adelaide 15.16 (106) in the 1938 SANFL Grand Final
  - Magarey Medal won by Bob Quinn (Port Adelaide)
- Western Australian National Football League
  - 15 October – Claremont 15.11 (101) defeat East Fremantle 11.13 (79) to win their first WANFL premiership in the Grand Final Replay, after the Tigers had scored 13.16 (94) to Old Easts’ 14.10 (94) in the first Grand Final on 8 October.
  - Sandover Medal won by Haydn Bunton, Sr. (Subiaco)

== Baseball ==
- World Series – New York Yankees defeat the Chicago Cubs, 4–0.
- Hall of Fame election – Continuing toward the goal of 10 initial inductees at the 1939 opening of the Hall, voters select Grover Cleveland Alexander. A special committee selects organizer Alexander Cartwright and promoter Henry Chadwick; selections of 19th century players are again postponed.
- Starting pitcher Johnny Vander Meer (Cincinnati Reds) throws back–to–back no-hitters, meaning they came in two consecutive starts, something not accomplished before or since.
- March 1 – Nankai Hawks, officially founded in Japanese Baseball League, as predecessor of Fukuoka SoftBank Hawks.

== Basketball ==
NBL Championship

- Akron Goodyear Wingfoots over Oshkosh All-Stars (2–1)

Events

- The sixth South American Basketball Championship in Lima is won by Peru.

Argentina

- Asociacion Deportiva Atenas was founded in Cordoba on April 17.

== Boxing ==
Events

- American boxer Henry Armstrong simultaneously holds the welterweight, lightweight, and featherweight world titles.

Lineal world champions

- World Heavyweight Championship – Joe Louis
- World Light Heavyweight Championship – John Henry Lewis
- World Middleweight Championship – vacant
- World Welterweight Championship – Barney Ross → Henry Armstrong
- World Lightweight Championship – Lou Ambers → Henry Armstrong
- World Featherweight Championship – Henry Armstrong → vacant
- World Bantamweight Championship – Harry Jeffra → Sixto Escobar
- World Flyweight Championship – Benny Lynch → vacant → Peter Kane

== Cricket ==
Events

- 24 August – England defeat Australia by an innings and 579 runs, the biggest winning margin in Test cricket history.

England

- County Championship – won by Yorkshire
- Minor Counties Championship – won by Buckinghamshire
- Most runs – Wally Hammond 3,011 @ 75.27 (HS 271)
- Most wickets – Arthur Wellard 172 @ 20.29 (BB 7–59)
- England and Australia tie one Test each with two draws
- Wisden Cricketers of the Year – Hugh Bartlett, Bill Brown, Denis Compton, Kenneth Farnes, Arthur Wood

Australia

- Sheffield Shield won by New South Wales
- Most runs – Don Bradman 1,437 @ 89.81 (HS 246)
- Most wickets
  - Bill O‘Reilly 64 @ 12.25 (BB 9-41)
  - Chuck Fleetwood-Smith 64 @ 22.43 (BB 9–135)

India

- Bombay Pentangular – Muslims
- Ranji Trophy – Hyderabad beat Nawanagar by one wicket

South Africa

- Currie Cup – not contested

New Zealand

- Plunket Shield – won by Auckland

West Indies

- Inter-Colonial Tournament – won by British Guiana

== Cycling ==
Tour de France

- Gino Bartali wins the 32nd Tour de France

Giro d'Italia

- Giovanni Valetti of Fréjus wins the 26th Giro d'Italia

== Figure skating ==
- World Figure Skating Championships –
  - Men's champion: Felix Kaspar, Austria
  - Ladies' champion: Megan Taylor, Great Britain
  - Pair skating champion: Maxi Herber & Ernst Baier, Germany

== Golf ==
Men's professional

- Masters Tournament – Henry Picard
- U.S. Open – Ralph Guldahl
- British Open – Reg Whitcombe
- PGA Championship – Paul Runyan

Men's amateur

- British Amateur – Charlie Yates
- U.S. Amateur – Willie Turnesa

Women's professional

- Women's Western Open – Bea Barrett
- Titleholders Championship – Patty Berg

== Horse racing ==
- In what is billed as the “Match of the Century”, Seabiscuit defeats the US Triple Crown of Thoroughbred Racing champion, War Admiral.

Steeplechases

- Cheltenham Gold Cup – Morse Code
- Grand National – Battleship

Hurdle races

- Champion Hurdle – Our Hope

Flat races

- Australia – Melbourne Cup won by Catalogue
- Canada – King's Plate won by Bunty Lawless
- France – Prix de l'Arc de Triomphe won by Eclair au Chocolat
- Ireland – Irish Derby Stakes won by Rosewell
- English Triple Crown Races:
  1. 2,000 Guineas Stakes – Pasch
  2. The Derby – Bois Roussel
  3. St. Leger Stakes – Scottish Union
- United States Triple Crown Races:
  1. Kentucky Derby – Lawrin
  2. Preakness Stakes – War Admiral
  3. Belmont Stakes – War Admiral

== Ice hockey ==
- The Chicago Black Hawks defeat the Toronto Maple Leafs three games to one in the Stanley Cup Finals.

== Multi-sport events ==
- 3rd British Empire Games held in Sydney, Australia

== Nordic skiing ==
FIS Nordic World Ski Championships

- 11th FIS Nordic World Ski Championships 1938 are held at Lahti, Finland

== Rowing ==
The Boat Race

- 2 April — Oxford wins the 90th Oxford and Cambridge Boat Race

== Rugby league ==
- 1937–38 Kangaroo tour
- 1938 European Rugby League Championship / 1938–39 European Rugby League Championship
- 1938 New Zealand rugby league season
- 1938 NSWRFL season
- 1937–38 Northern Rugby Football League season / 1938–39 Northern Rugby Football League season

== Rugby union ==
- 51st Home Nations Championship series is won by Scotland

== Skiing ==
- The Cannon Mountain Aerial Tramway, the first aerial tramway in the United States, opens at Cannon Mountain Ski Area.

== Snooker ==
- World Snooker Championship – Joe Davis beats Sidney Smith 37–24

== Speed skating ==
Speed Skating World Championships

- Men's All-round Champion – Ivar Ballangrud (Norway)
- Women's All-round Champion – Laila Schou Nilsen (Norway)

== Tennis ==
Australia

- Australian Men's Singles Championship – Don Budge (USA) defeats John Bromwich (Australia) 6–4, 6–2, 6–1
- Australian Women's Singles Championship – Dorothy Cheney (USA) defeats Dorothy Stevenson (Australia) 6–3, 6–2

England

- Wimbledon Men's Singles Championship – Don Budge (USA) defeats Bunny Austin (Great Britain) 6–1, 6–0, 6–3
- Wimbledon Women's Singles Championship – Helen Wills Moody (USA) defeats Helen Jacobs (USA) 6–4, 6–0

France

- French Men's Singles Championship – Don Budge (USA) defeats Roderich Menzel (Czechoslovakia) 6–3, 6–2, 6–4
- French Women's Singles Championship – Simonne Mathieu (France) defeats Nelly Adamson Landry (France) 6–0, 6–3

USA

- American Men's Singles Championship – Don Budge (USA) defeats Gene Mako (USA) 6–3, 6–8, 6–2, 6–1
- American Women's Singles Championship – Alice Marble (USA) defeats Nancye Wynne Bolton (Australia) 6–0, 6–3

Events

- Don Budge becomes the first male tennis player to complete the Grand Slam in tennis of all 4 Championships.

Davis Cup

- 1938 International Lawn Tennis Challenge – United States 3–2 Australia at Germantown Cricket Club (grass) Philadelphia, United States

== Awards ==
- Associated Press Male Athlete of the Year – Don Budge, Tennis
- Associated Press Female Athlete of the Year – Patty Berg, LPGA golf
