= 1939 in sports =

Note — Several annual sporting events did not take place in 1939, because of the outbreak of World War II.

1939 in sports describes the year's events in world sports.

== Alpine skiing ==
FIS Alpine World Ski Championships 9th FIS Alpine World Ski Championships are held at Zakopane, Poland. The events are a downhill, a slalom and a combined race in both the men's and women's categories. The winners are:

- Men's Downhill – Hellmut Lantschner (Germany)
- Men's Slalom – Rudolf Rominger (Switzerland)
- Men's Combined – Josef Jennewein (Germany)
- Women's Downhill – Christl Cranz (Germany)
- Women's Slalom – Christl Cranz (Germany)
- Women's Combined – Christl Cranz (Germany)

== American football ==
- NFL Championship – the Green Bay Packers won 27–0 over the New York Giants at Milwaukee's Dairy Bowl
- Sugar Bowl (1938 season):
  - The Texas Christian Horned Frogs won 15–7 over the Carnegie Tech Tartans to win the college football national championship
- September 30 - The first televised football game is played between the Fordham Rams and the Waynesburg Yellow Jackets. NBC broadcast the game on station W2XBS with Bill Stern as the sole announcer.

== Association football ==
England

- First Division – Everton win the 1938–39 title.
- FA Cup – Portsmouth beat Wolverhampton Wanderers 4–1.
- The outbreak of World War II means all competitive football in England is suspended in September, and the 1939–40 season cancelled. Various regional leagues and cups are set up in place of normal Football League and FA Cup competition.

Spain

- La Liga – not contested due to the Spanish Civil War

Germany

- German football championship – won by Schalke 04

Italy

- Serie A – won by Bologna

Portugal

- Primeira Liga – won by F.C. Porto

France

- French Division 1 – won by FC Sète.

== Athletics ==
- September 17 – Taisto Mäki breaks the 10,000 m world record, becoming the first man to run the distance inside half an hour.

== Australian rules football ==
- Victorian Football League
  - Melbourne wins the 43rd VFL Premiership, defeating Collingwood 21.22 (148) to 14.11 (95) in the 1939 VFL Grand Final
  - Brownlow Medal awarded to Marcus Whelan (Collingwood)
- South Australian National Football League
  - 30 September – Port Adelaide win their thirteenth SANFL premiership, defeating West Torrens 16.28 (124) to 11.11 (77).
  - Magarey Medal won by Jeff Pash (North Adelaide) and Ray McArthur^{[a]} (West Adelaide)
- Western Australian National Football League
  - 7 October – Claremont win their second successive premiership, defeating East Fremantle 14.11 (95) to 11.10 (76)
  - Sandover Medal won by Haydn Bunton, Sr. (Subiaco)

== Baseball ==
- January 24 – Hall of Fame election – The goal of 10 initial inductees from the 20th century is finally met as voters select George Sisler, Eddie Collins, and Willie Keeler.
- May 2 – Cap Anson, Buck Ewing, Charles "Hoss" Radbourn, Albert Spalding, Charles Comiskey, and Candy Cummings are named to the Hall of Fame by a special committee, just weeks before the Hall opens. Along with the previous selections of Cy Young and Keeler in the writers' elections, Anson, Ewing and Radbourn arguably complete the 5 initial inductees from the 19th century which were promised but long delayed; Spalding, Comiskey and Cummings were largely elected as pioneers and contributors.
- May 2 – Lou Gehrig's streak of 2130 consecutive Major League Baseball games played comes to an end. The record will stand for 56 years before Cal Ripken Jr. breaks it.
- June 12 – The National Baseball Hall of Fame and Museum is dedicated in Cooperstown, New York.
- July 4 – Gehrig announces his retirement from the game at Yankee Stadium after being diagnosed with a terminal illness.
- August 26 – The first televised major–league baseball game is Brooklyn's 6–1 victory over Cincinnati at Ebbets Field.
- World Series – New York Yankees defeat Cincinnati Reds, 4–0.
- The Winnipeg Maroons win the Northern League championship.
- Little League Baseball is formed in Williamsport, Pennsylvania as a three–team league.
- December – A special election results in Gehrig being selected to the Hall of Fame; he had announced his retirement after the Hall's June opening.

== Basketball ==
NBL Championship

- Akron Firestone Non-Skids over Oshkosh All-Stars (3–2)

Events

- March 22 – Undefeated LIU tops undefeated Loyola of Chicago in the championship game of the second annual National Invitation Tournament, 44–32. LIU's 24–0 final record is the first perfect season of college basketball's postseason tournament era.
- March – The first NCAA Tournament is played. On March 27, the University of Oregon defeats Ohio State University 46–33 in Evanston, Illinois, to become the inaugural champions of this tournament.
- The third European basketball championship, Eurobasket 1939, is won by Lithuania.
- The seventh South American Basketball Championship in Rio de Janeiro is won by Brazil.

== Boxing ==
Events

- June – World Light Heavyweight Champion John Henry Lewis retires undefeated, his title later being claimed by Billy Conn

Lineal world champions

- World Heavyweight Championship – Joe Louis
- World Light Heavyweight Championship – John Henry Lewis → vacant → Billy Conn
- World Middleweight Championship – vacant
- World Welterweight Championship – Barney Ross → Henry Armstrong
- World Lightweight Championship – Henry Armstrong → Lou Ambers
- World Featherweight Championship – vacant → Joey Archibald
- World Bantamweight Championship – Sixto Escobar → vacant
- World Flyweight Championship – Peter Kane → vacant

== Cricket ==
Events

- 29 May – Northamptonshire gains (over Leicestershire at Northampton) their first victory for 99 matches, easily a record in the County Championship. Their last Championship victory was as far back as 14 May 1935 over Somerset at Taunton.
- 23 August – The threat of war causes the West Indian touring team to preemptively cancel its last six matches and return home
- 2 September – The British declaration of war causes all remaining first-class matches to be cancelled. No further first-class games would be played in England until 19 May 1945.

England

- County Championship – won by Yorkshire
- Minor Counties Championship – won by Surrey Second Eleven
- Most runs – Len Hutton 2,883 @ 62.67 (HS 280 not out)
- Most wickets – Tom Goddard 200 @ 14.86 (BB 9–38)
- England defeat West Indies one Test to nil with two draws
- Wisden Cricketers of the Year – Learie Constantine, Bill Edrich, Walter Keeton, Brian Sellers, Doug Wright

Australia

- Sheffield Shield won by South Australia
- Most runs – Bill Brown 1,057 @ 105.70 (HS 215 not out)
- Most wickets – Chuck Fleetwood-Smith 30 @ 39.73 (BB 7–144)

India

- Bombay Pentangular – Hindus
- Ranji Trophy – Bengal beat Southern Punjab by 178 runs

South Africa

- Currie Cup – Transvaal
- England defeat South Africa one Test to nil with four draws

New Zealand

- Plunket Shield – won by Auckland

== Cycling ==
Tour de France

- Sylvère Maes wins the 33rd Tour de France

Giro d'Italia

- Giovanni Valetti of Fréjus wins the 27th Giro d'Italia

== Figure skating ==
- World Figure Skating Championships:
  - Men's champion – Graham Sharp, Great Britain
  - Ladies' champion – Megan Taylor, Great Britain
  - Pair skating champion – Maxi Herber & Ernst Baier, Germany

== Golf ==
Men's professional

- Masters Tournament – Ralph Guldahl
- U.S. Open – Byron Nelson
- British Open – Dick Burton
- PGA Championship – Henry Picard

Men's amateur

- British Amateur – Alex Kyle
- U.S. Amateur – Bud Ward

Women's professional

- Women's Western Open – Helen Dettweiler
- Titleholders Championship – Patty Berg

== Horse racing ==
Steeplechases

- Cheltenham Gold Cup – Brendan's Cottage
- Grand National – Workman

Hurdle races

- Champion Hurdle – African Sister

Flat races

- Australia – Melbourne Cup won by Rivette
- Canada – King's Plate won by Archworth
- France – Prix de l'Arc de Triomphe – not held due to World War II
- Ireland – Irish Derby Stakes won by Mondragon
- English Triple Crown Races:
  1. 2,000 Guineas Stakes – Blue Peter
  2. The Derby – Blue Peter
  3. St. Leger Stakes – no race
- United States Triple Crown Races:
  1. Kentucky Derby – Johnstown
  2. Preakness Stakes – Challedon
  3. Belmont Stakes – Johnstown

== Ice hockey ==
- Boston Bruins won 4 games to 1 over the Toronto Maple Leafs to win the Stanley Cup

== Nordic skiing ==
FIS Nordic World Ski Championships

- 12th FIS Nordic World Ski Championships 1939 are held at Zakopane, Poland

== Rowing ==
The Boat Race

- 1 April — Cambridge wins the 91st Oxford and Cambridge Boat Race

== Rugby league ==
- 1938–39 European Rugby League Championship
- 1939 New Zealand rugby league season
- 1939 NSWRFL season
- 1938–39 Northern Rugby Football League season / 1939–40 Northern Rugby Football League Wartime Emergency League season

== Rugby union ==
- 52nd Home Nations Championship series is shared by England, Ireland and Wales
- France is readmitted to the championship after the 1939 series is completed but will be unable to take part again until 1947 due to the suspension of international rugby during World War II

== Snooker ==
- World Snooker Championship – Joe Davis beats Sidney Smith 43–30

== Speed skating ==
Speed Skating World Championships

- Men's All-round Champion – Birger Wasenius (Finland)
- Women's All-round Champion – Verné Lesche (Finland)

== Tennis ==
Australia

- Australian Men's Singles Championship – John Bromwich (Australia) defeats Adrian Quist (Australia) 6–4, 6–1, 6–3
- Australian Women's Singles Championship – Emily Hood Westacott (Australia) defeats Nell Hall Hopman (Australia) 6–1, 6–2

England

- Wimbledon Men's Singles Championship – Bobby Riggs (USA) defeats Elwood Cooke (USA) 2–6, 8–6, 3–6, 6–3, 6–2
- Wimbledon Women's Singles Championship – Alice Marble (USA) defeats Kay Stammers Bullitt (Great Britain) 6–2, 6–0

France

- French Men's Singles Championship – Don McNeill (USA) defeats Bobby Riggs (USA) 7–5, 6–0, 6–3
- French Women's Singles Championship – Simonne Mathieu (France) defeats Jadwiga Jedrzejowska (Poland) 6–3, 8–6

USA

- American Men's Singles Championship – Bobby Riggs (USA) defeats Welby Van Horn (USA) 6–4, 6–2, 6–4
- American Women's Singles Championship – Alice Marble (USA) defeats Helen Jacobs (USA) 6–0, 8–10, 6–4

Events

- Alice Marble wins Wimbledon Ladies' Singles, Doubles and Mixed Doubles, US Open Women's Singles, Doubles and Mixed Doubles, as well as Associated Press Athlete of the Year.

Davis Cup

- 1939 International Lawn Tennis Challenge – Australia 3–2 United States (15) Merion Cricket Club (grass) Haverford, United States

== Awards ==
- Associated Press Male Athlete of the Year – Nile Kinnick, College football
- Associated Press Female Athlete of the Year – Alice Marble, Tennis

== Notes ==
^{a} Awarded retrospectively by the SANFL in 1998.
