= FIS Alpine World Ski Championships 1938 – Men's downhill =

Men's downhill at the FIS Alpine World Ski Championships 1938
- Location: Engelberg, Switzerland
- Dates: 5 March
- Winning time: 3:17.8

Medalists
gold medal	James Couttet	France
silver medal	Emile Allais	France
bronze medal	Hellmut Lantschner	Germany

The Men's downhill competition at the 1938 World Championships was held on 5 March 1938.

== Results ==
Rank	Name	Country	Time	Diff
1st place, gold medalist(s)	James Couttet	France	3:17.8	
2nd place, silver medalist(s)	Émile Allais	France	3:19.8	+2.0
3rd place, bronze medalist(s)	Hellmut Lantschner	Germany	3:24.6	+6.8
4	Rudolf Rominger	Switzerland	3:26.2	+8.4
5	Roman Wörndle	Germany	3:28.6	+10.8
5	Thaddäus Schwabl	Austria	3:28.6	+10.8
7	Joseph Pertsch	Germany	3:34.6	+16.8
8	Anton Bäder	Germany	3:36.2	+18.4
9	Rudolph Matt	Austria	3:36.6	+18.8
