= FIS Alpine World Ski Championships 1941 =

Skiing event in Cortina d'Ampezzo, Italy

Coordinates: 46.533°N 12.133°E

- Host city: Cortina d'Ampezzo
- Country: Italy
- Events: 6
- Opening: 1 February 1941
- Closing: 9 February 1941
- Opened by: Victor Emmanuel III

Location in the Alps of Europe

The FIS Alpine World Ski Championships 1941 in alpine skiing were the tenth edition of the competition, organized by the International Ski Federation (FIS), and were held on 1–9 February 1941 in Cortina d’Ampezzo, Italy. The FIS Nordic World Ski Championships 1941 were held simultaneously at the same location. Later, in 1946, the FIS canceled the results and deemed the Championships unofficial as the attendees only included Axis nationals and citizens of neutral countries: Italy, the German Reich (Austria joined Germany in 1938), Bulgaria, Finland, Sweden, Norway, Yugoslavia, Romania, Switzerland and Hungary.

Due to World War II, there was a nine-year hiatus of the official competition until the 1948 Winter Olympics.

== Men's competitions ==
=== Downhill ===
Place	Country	Name
1st place, gold medalist(s)	Germany (GER)	Josef Jennewein
2nd place, silver medalist(s)	Italy (ITA)	Alberto Marcellin
3rd place, bronze medalist(s)	Germany (GER)	Rudolf Cranz

=== Slalom ===
Place	Country	name
1st place, gold medalist(s)	Germany (GER)	Albert Pfeifer
1st place, gold medalist(s)	Italy (ITA)	Vittorio Chierroni
3rd place, bronze medalist(s)	Italy (ITA)	Alberto Marcellin

=== Combined ===
Place	Country	Name
1st place, gold medalist(s)	Germany (GER)	Josef Jennewein
2nd place, silver medalist(s)	Italy (ITA)	Alberto Marcellin
3rd place, bronze medalist(s)	Italy (ITA)	Vittorio Chierroni

== Women's competitions ==
=== Downhill ===
Place	Country	Name
1st place, gold medalist(s)	Germany (GER)	Christl Cranz
2nd place, silver medalist(s)	Germany (GER)	Käthe Grasegger
3rd place, bronze medalist(s)	Germany (GER)	Anneliese Proxauf

- Many sources state that Proxauf (who in fact was Austrian) represented Switzerland, but this photo proves otherwise.

=== Slalom ===
Place	Country	Name
1st place, gold medalist(s)	Italy (ITA)	Celina Seghi
2nd place, silver medalist(s)	Germany (GER)	Christl Cranz
3rd place, bronze medalist(s)	Germany (GER)	Anneliese Proxauf

=== Combined ===
Place	Country	Name
1st place, gold medalist(s)	Germany (GER)	Christl Cranz
2nd place, silver medalist(s)	Italy (ITA)	Celina Seghi
3rd place, bronze medalist(s)	Germany (GER)	Anneliese Proxauf

== Medal standings ==
Place	Country	Gold	Silver	Bronze	Total
1	Germany (Germany)	5	2	4	11
2	Italy (Italy)	2	3	2	7
