= FIS Alpine World Ski Championships 1935 =

Skiing event in Mürren, Switzerland

- Host city: Mürren
- Country: Switzerland
- Events: 6
- Opening: 22 February 1935
- Closing: 25 February 1935
- Opened by: Rudolf Minger

The FIS Alpine World Ski Championships 1935 in alpine skiing were the fifth edition of the competition, organized by the International Ski Federation (FIS), and held in Mürren, Switzerland in February 1935.

== Medal summary ==
=== Men's events ===
Event	Gold	Silver	Bronze
Downhill	Franz Zingerle (AUT)	Émile Allais (FRA)	Willi Steuri (SUI)
Slalom	Anton Seelos (AUT)	David Zogg (SUI)	Friedl Pfeiffer (AUT); François Vignole (FRA)
Combined	Anton Seelos (AUT)	Émile Allais (FRA)	Birger Ruud (NOR)

=== Women's events ===
Event	Gold	Silver	Bronze
Downhill	Christl Cranz (GER)	Hady Pfeiffer (GER)	Anny Rüegg (SUI)
Slalom	Anny Rüegg (SUI)	Christl Cranz (GER)	Käthe Grasegger (GER)
Combined	Christl Cranz (GER)	Anny Rüegg (SUI)	Käthe Grasegger (GER)

== Medal table ==
* Host nation (Switzerland)

Rank	Nation	Gold	Silver	Bronze	Total
1	Austria (AUT)	3	0	1	4
2	Germany (GER)	2	2	2	6
3	Switzerland (SUI)*	1	2	2	5
4	France (FRA)	0	2	1	3
5	Norway (NOR)	0	0	1	1
Totals (5 entries)		6	6	7	19
