= Franz Zingerle =

Austrian skier

Personal information
- Nationality: Austrian
- Born: 11 December 1908 Axams, Tyrol, Austria
- Died: 12 June 1988 (aged 79) Axams, Tyrol, Austria

Sport
- Sport: Alpine skiing
Medal record
Representing Austria
Men's Alpine skiing
World championship
Gold medal – first place	1935 Mürren	Downhill

Franz Zingerle (11 December 1908 – 12 June 1988) was an Austrian alpine skier and world champion. Zingerle became a world downhill champion in 1935.

== Biography ==
He comes from a poor farmers family as the oldest son from a total of eight kids. Already during his childhood he developed a love for skiing. As a teenager, he first worked as a laborer until he learned to be a bricklayer. At the age of 17, he bought skis for the first time and joined the Axams, ski club which held the first ski races on the Birgitzer Alm. Shortly after he joined the club, he became the club's first club champion in 1926. Moreover, 1926 is considered as the beginning year of his successful career. At the age of 21, he came to the Tyrol Ski Club, where he was able to participate regularly in ski races in the winter of 1929/30. The following season, he was downhill and slalom winner in Seefeld.

In the winter of 1932, he won the downhill and the combination competition at the Austrian championships in Zell am See. He then took part in Cortina d'Ampezzo, with his best result of sixth place in the slalom. With second place in downhill and slalom, he also took the victory in the combination at Feldberg in the Black Forest in the same year. In addition, he ended the season with a slalom win at the Arlberg-Kandahar races in St. Anton.

In the winter of 1933, he won the Tyrolean downhill skiing championship and the cross-country skiing competition at the Vorarlberg championships. At the Austrian championship in Kitzbühel, the now 24-year-old skier reached second place in the slalom and the combination competition. In the same winter he won the combination victory in the competition for the "Golden Ring" from Seefeld.

In 1934, Franz Zingerle successfully passed the state ski instructor examination. In the same year he became the national coach of the Czechoslovak team. in the 1933/34 season, he won the downhill from the Glungezer. In the winter of 1935, Zingerle concentrated on his career and celebrated his greatest triumph in his career with the downhill victory at the World Championship in Mürren. He also achieved top position at the Austrian championship in Zell am See and was very successful in international races abroad, where he won the ČSR Grand Prix in the High Tatras and the downhill on the Marmolada in the Dolomites.

In the winter of 1937, he participated for the last time at a world championship but with a disappointing 13th place in slalom. He was no longer able to match or hold his previous performances. He achieved further good results with fifth place in the downhill run and seventh place in the gate run at the Grand Prix of Megève. Afterwards, Franz Zingerle ended his active career and only competed in regional races, whereby in 1939 he was once again able to win the title of Tyrolean downhill champion.

During his last season as an active player, he also worked as a coach for the French women's national team in 1937/38. In the winter of 1938/39, he took over the Polish national team, but had to withdraw from the post after the war began. Franz Zingerle was captured in World War II. After returning home, he went back to his old job as a bricklayer and took care of the family's small agriculture. He only continued to follow skiing to support his only child, his daughter Christine, who showed talent during school and adolescence, but she was not interested anymore.

Today, Franz Zingerle is known for his accomplishments which he achieved during his career.
