= FIS Alpine World Ski Championships =

International alpine skiing event

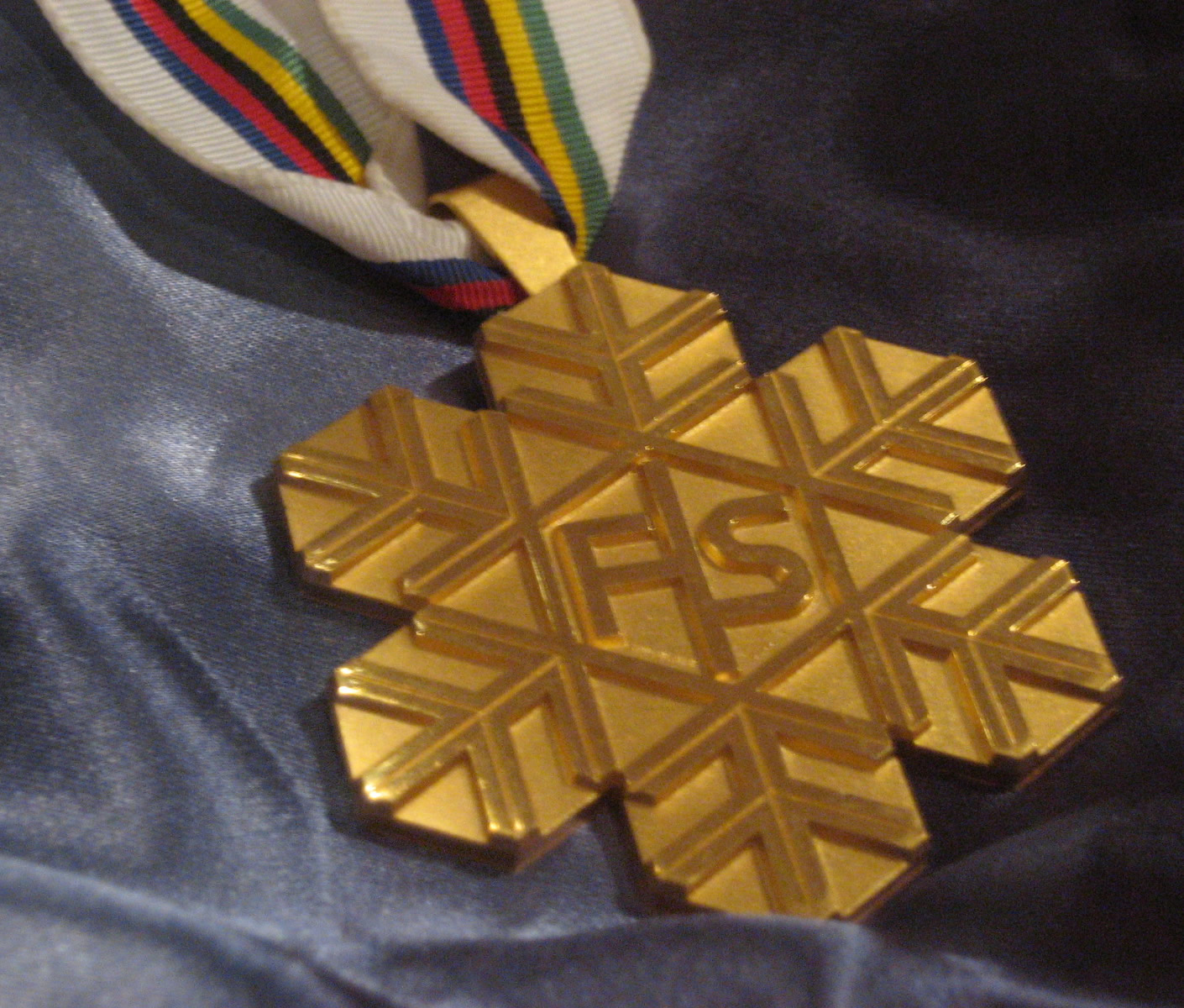
- Gold medal
- Status: active
- Genre: sporting event
- Date: January–February
- Frequency: biennial
- Location: various
- Inaugurated: 1931
- Organiser: FIS

The FIS Alpine World Ski Championships is an alpine skiing competition organized by the International Ski Federation (FIS).

== History ==
The inaugural world championships in alpine skiing were held in 1931. It consisted of downhill and slalom events for men and women. Next year the combined event was added to the program as a "paper" race which used the results of the downhill and slalom. During the 1930s, the event was held annually in Europe, until interrupted by the outbreak of World War II, preventing a 1940 event. An event was held in 1941, but included competitors only from nations from the Axis powers or nations not at war with them. The results were later cancelled by the FIS in 1946 because of the limited number of participants, so they are not considered official.

Following the war, the championships were connected with the Olympics for several decades. From 1948 through 1982, the competition was held in even-numbered years, with the Winter Olympics acting as the World Championships through 1980, and a separate competition held in even-numbered non-Olympic years. The 1950 championships in the United States at Aspen were the first held outside of Europe and the first official championships separate of the Olympics since 1939.

The combined event was dropped after 1948 with the addition of the giant slalom in 1950, but returned in 1954 as a "paper" race which used the results of the three events: downhill, giant slalom, and slalom. During Olympic years from 1956 through 1980, FIS World Championship medals were awarded in the combined, but not Olympic medals. The combined returned as a separately run event in 1982 with its own downhill and two-run slalom, and the Super-G was added to the program in 1987 (both disciplines were also added to the Olympics in 1988).

There were no World Championships in 1983 or 1984 and since 1985, they have been scheduled in odd-numbered years, independent of the Winter Olympics. A lack of snow in southern Spain in 1995 caused a postponement to the following year.

The mixed nations team event was added to the program in 2005. Since 2007, the combined event switched to the new "super combined" format (one run each of downhill and slalom instead of one-run downhill and two-run slalom). The parallel giant slalom was added to the program in 2021. In 2025, the individual combined event was replaced with team combined event (which involve two-person national teams assigned to downhill and slalom respectively) and the parallel giant slalom was dropped from the World Championships.

== Summary ==
Held as part of the Winter Olympics
Deemed unofficial by the FIS

Year	Place	Country	Event name	Official FIS designation	Events
1931	Mürren	Switzerland	FIS Alpine World Ski Championships 1931	1st Alpine World Ski Championships	4
1932	Cortina d'Ampezzo	Italy	FIS Alpine World Ski Championships 1932	2nd Alpine World Ski Championships	6
1933	Innsbruck	Austria	FIS Alpine World Ski Championships 1933	3rd Alpine World Ski Championships	6
1934	St. Moritz	Switzerland	FIS Alpine World Ski Championships 1934	4th Alpine World Ski Championships	6
1935	Mürren	Switzerland	FIS Alpine World Ski Championships 1935	5th Alpine World Ski Championships	6
1936	Innsbruck	Austria	FIS Alpine World Ski Championships 1936	6th Alpine World Ski Championships	6
1937	Chamonix	France	FIS Alpine World Ski Championships 1937	7th Alpine World Ski Championships	6
1938	Engelberg	Switzerland	FIS Alpine World Ski Championships 1938	8th Alpine World Ski Championships	6
1939	Zakopane	Poland	FIS Alpine World Ski Championships 1939	9th Alpine World Ski Championships	6
1941	Cortina d'Ampezzo	Italy	FIS Alpine World Ski Championships 1941	none (Note: Deemed to have been unofficial by the FIS due to being held during World War II with participation restricted to citizens of Axis and neutral nations.)	6
1948	St. Moritz	Switzerland	1948 Winter Olympics	10th Alpine World Ski Championships	6
1950	Aspen	United States	FIS Alpine World Ski Championships 1950	11th Alpine World Ski Championships	6
1952	Oslo	Norway	1952 Winter Olympics	12th Alpine World Ski Championships	6
1954	Åre	Sweden	FIS Alpine World Ski Championships 1954	13th Alpine World Ski Championships	8
1956	Cortina d'Ampezzo	Italy	1956 Winter Olympics	14th Alpine World Ski Championships	8
1958	Badgastein	Austria	FIS Alpine World Ski Championships 1958	15th Alpine World Ski Championships	8
1960	Squaw Valley	United States	1960 Winter Olympics	16th Alpine World Ski Championships	8
1962	Chamonix	France	FIS Alpine World Ski Championships 1962	17th Alpine World Ski Championships	8
1964	Innsbruck	Austria	1964 Winter Olympics	18th Alpine World Ski Championships	8
1966	Portillo	Chile	FIS Alpine World Ski Championships 1966	19th Alpine World Ski Championships	8
1968	Grenoble	France	1968 Winter Olympics	20th Alpine World Ski Championships	8
1970	Val Gardena	Italy	FIS Alpine World Ski Championships 1970	21st Alpine World Ski Championships	8
1972	Sapporo	Japan	1972 Winter Olympics	22nd Alpine World Ski Championships	8
1974	St. Moritz	Switzerland	FIS Alpine World Ski Championships 1974	23rd Alpine World Ski Championships	8
1976	Innsbruck	Austria	1976 Winter Olympics	24th Alpine World Ski Championships	8
1978	Garmisch-Partenkirchen	West Germany	FIS Alpine World Ski Championships 1978	25th Alpine World Ski Championships	8
1980	Lake Placid	United States	1980 Winter Olympics	26th Alpine World Ski Championships	8
1982	Schladming	Austria	FIS Alpine World Ski Championships 1982	27th Alpine World Ski Championships	8
1985	Bormio	Italy	FIS Alpine World Ski Championships 1985	28th Alpine World Ski Championships	8
1987	Crans-Montana	Switzerland	FIS Alpine World Ski Championships 1987	29th Alpine World Ski Championships	10
1989	Vail	United States	FIS Alpine World Ski Championships 1989	30th Alpine World Ski Championships	10
1991	Saalbach	Austria	FIS Alpine World Ski Championships 1991	31st Alpine World Ski Championships	10
1993	Morioka	Japan	FIS Alpine World Ski Championships 1993	32nd Alpine World Ski Championships	9
1996	Sierra Nevada	Spain	FIS Alpine World Ski Championships 1996	33rd Alpine World Ski Championships	10
1997	Sestriere	Italy	FIS Alpine World Ski Championships 1997	34th Alpine World Ski Championships	10
1999	Vail/Beaver Creek	United States	FIS Alpine World Ski Championships 1999	35th Alpine World Ski Championships	10
2001	St. Anton	Austria	FIS Alpine World Ski Championships 2001	36th Alpine World Ski Championships	10
2003	St. Moritz	Switzerland	FIS Alpine World Ski Championships 2003	37th Alpine World Ski Championships	10
2005	Bormio	Italy	FIS Alpine World Ski Championships 2005	38th Alpine World Ski Championships	11
2007	Åre	Sweden	FIS Alpine World Ski Championships 2007	39th Alpine World Ski Championships	11
2009	Val d'Isère	France	FIS Alpine World Ski Championships 2009	40th Alpine World Ski Championships	10
2011	Garmisch-Partenkirchen	Germany	FIS Alpine World Ski Championships 2011	41st Alpine World Ski Championships	11
2013	Schladming	Austria	FIS Alpine World Ski Championships 2013	42nd Alpine World Ski Championships	11
2015	Vail/Beaver Creek	United States	FIS Alpine World Ski Championships 2015	43rd Alpine World Ski Championships	11
2017	St. Moritz	Switzerland	FIS Alpine World Ski Championships 2017	44th Alpine World Ski Championships	11
2019	Åre	Sweden	FIS Alpine World Ski Championships 2019	45th Alpine World Ski Championships	11
2021	Cortina d'Ampezzo	Italy	FIS Alpine World Ski Championships 2021	46th Alpine World Ski Championships	13
2023	Courchevel-Méribel	France	FIS Alpine World Ski Championships 2023	47th Alpine World Ski Championships	13
2025	Saalbach	Austria	FIS Alpine World Ski Championships 2025	48th Alpine World Ski Championships	11
2027	Crans-Montana	Switzerland	FIS Alpine World Ski Championships 2027	49th Alpine World Ski Championships	11
2029	Narvik	Norway	FIS Alpine World Ski Championships 2029	50th Alpine World Ski Championships	?
2031	Val Gardena	Italy	FIS Alpine World Ski Championships 2031	51st Alpine World Ski Championships	?

== List of host countries ==
A total of twelve countries have hosted the FIS Alpine World Ski Championships, including those which were shared with the Winter Olympics. All of the top-7 on the list of nations which have won FIS World Cup races have been selected as host at least twice. The World Championships have been held only once in the Southern Hemisphere, in August 1966 at Portillo, Chile. The list is complete through 2025 and does not include the unofficial 1941 event.

Country	World Championships hosted			Earliest year	Latest year	Future
Country	Total number	Independent	Shared with Olympics	Earliest year	Latest year	Future
Austria	10	8	2	1933	2025	
Switzerland	9	8	1	1931	2017	2027
Italy	7	6	1	1932	2021	2031
United States	6	4	2	1950	2015	
France	5	4	1	1937	2023	
Sweden	3	3	0	1954	2019	
Germany	2	2	0	1978	2011	
Japan	2	1	1	1972	1993	
Poland	1	1	0	1939		
Chile	1	1	0	1966		
Spain	1	1	0	1996		
Norway	1	0	1	1952		2029
Totals	48	39	9	1931	2025	

== Events ==
Event	31	32	33	34	35	36	37	38	39	48	50	52	54	56	58	60	62	64	66	68	70	72	74	76	78	80	82	85	87	89	91	93	96	97	99	01	03	05	07	09	11	13	15	17	19	21	23	25
Men's combined		•	•	•	•	•	•	•	•	•			•	•	•	•	•	•	•	•	•	•	•	•	•	•	•	•	•	•	•	•	•	•	•	•	•	•	•	•	•	•	•	•	•	•	•	
Men's downhill	•	•	•	•	•	•	•	•	•	•	•	•	•	•	•	•	•	•	•	•	•	•	•	•	•	•	•	•	•	•	•	•	•	•	•	•	•	•	•	•	•	•	•	•	•	•	•	•
Men's slalom	•	•	•	•	•	•	•	•	•	•	•	•	•	•	•	•	•	•	•	•	•	•	•	•	•	•	•	•	•	•	•	•	•	•	•	•	•	•	•	•	•	•	•	•	•	•	•	•
Men's giant slalom											•	•	•	•	•	•	•	•	•	•	•	•	•	•	•	•	•	•	•	•	•	•	•	•	•	•	•	•	•	•	•	•	•	•	•	•	•	•
Men's super-G																													•	•	•		•	•	•	•	•	•	•	•	•	•	•	•	•	•	•	•
Men's parallel event																																														•	•	
Men's team combined																																																•
Women's combined		•	•	•	•	•	•	•	•	•			•	•	•	•	•	•	•	•	•	•	•	•	•	•	•	•	•	•	•	•	•	•	•	•	•	•	•	•	•	•	•	•	•	•	•	
Women's downhill	•	•	•	•	•	•	•	•	•	•	•	•	•	•	•	•	•	•	•	•	•	•	•	•	•	•	•	•	•	•	•	•	•	•	•	•	•	•	•	•	•	•	•	•	•	•	•	•
Women's slalom	•	•	•	•	•	•	•	•	•	•	•	•	•	•	•	•	•	•	•	•	•	•	•	•	•	•	•	•	•	•	•	•	•	•	•	•	•	•	•	•	•	•	•	•	•	•	•	•
Women's giant slalom											•	•	•	•	•	•	•	•	•	•	•	•	•	•	•	•	•	•	•	•	•	•	•	•	•	•	•	•	•	•	•	•	•	•	•	•	•	•
Women's super-G																													•	•	•	•	•	•	•	•	•	•	•	•	•	•	•	•	•	•	•	•
Women's parallel event																																														•	•	
Women's team combined																																																•
Mixed Nations Team Event																																						•	•		•	•	•	•	•	•	•	•
Total Events	4	6	6	6	6	6	6	6	6	6	6	6	8	8	8	8	8	8	8	8	8	8	8	8	8	8	8	8	10	10	10	9	10	10	10	10	10	11	11	10	11	11	11	11	11	13	13	11

Note: The men's super-G in 1993 and the team event in 2009 were cancelled due to adverse weather conditions, and no medals were awarded.

== Skiers with most victories ==
Top 10 skiers who won more gold medals at the Alpine Skiing World Championships (including at team events) are listed below. Boldface denotes active skiers and highest medal count among all skiers (including these who not included in these tables) per type.

=== Men ===
Rank	Skier	Country	From	To	Gold	Silver	Bronze	Total
1	**Marcel Hirscher**	Austria	2013	2019	7 **	4	–	11 **
2	Toni Sailer	Austria	1956	1958	**7**	1	–	8
3	Jean-Claude Killy	France	1966	1968	6	–	–	6
4	Kjetil André Aamodt	Norway	1991	2003	5	4	3	**12**
5	Aksel Lund Svindal	Norway	2005	2019	5	2	2	9
6	Gustav Thöni	Italy	1972	1976	5	2	–	7
7	Ingemar Stenmark	Sweden	1976	1982	5	1	1	7
8	Ted Ligety	United States	2009	2015	5	–	2	7
9	Marc Girardelli	Luxembourg	1985	1996	4	4	3	11
10	Pirmin Zurbriggen	Switzerland	1985	1989	4	4	1	9

=== Women ===
Rank	Skier	Country	From	To	Gold	Silver	Bronze	Total
1	**Mikaela Shiffrin**	United States	2013	2025	**8 ***	4	3	**15 ***
2	Marielle Goitschel	France	1962	1968	7	4	–	11
3	Anja Pärson	Sweden	2001	2011	7	2 *	4 *	13 **
4	Erika Hess	Switzerland	1980	1987	6	–	1	7
5	Annemarie Moser-Pröll	Austria	1970	1980	5	2	2	9
6	Janica Kostelić	Croatia	2003	2005	5	–	–	5
7	Tina Maze	Slovenia	2009	2015	4	5	–	9
8	Hanni Wenzel	Liechtenstein	1974	1980	4	3	2	9
9	Pernilla Wiberg	Sweden	1991	1999	4	1	1	6

* Including one medal in the team event
** Including two medals in the team events

== Skiers with most individual medals ==
Participants with five or more medals in the individual disciplines (not including team events) at the Alpine Skiing World Championships are (boldface denotes active skiers):

=== Men ===
Skier	Country	Total	Gold	Silver	Bronze
Kjetil André Aamodt	Norway	12	5	4	3
Marc Girardelli	Luxembourg	11	4	4	3
Lasse Kjus	Norway	11	3	8	0
**Marcel Hirscher**	Austria	9	5	4	0
Aksel Lund Svindal	Norway	9	5	2	2
Pirmin Zurbriggen	Switzerland	9	4	4	1
Toni Sailer	Austria	8	7	1	0
Émile Allais	France	8	4	4	0
Gustav Thöni	Italy	7	5	2	0
Ingemar Stenmark	Sweden	7	5	1	1
Ted Ligety	United States	7	5	0	2
Rudolf Rominger	Switzerland	7	4	1	2
David Zogg	Switzerland	7	3	4	0
Benjamin Raich	Austria	7	2	4	1
Alexis Pinturault	France	7	2	1	4
Jean-Claude Killy	France	6	6	0	0
Stein Eriksen	Norway	6	4	1	1
Hermann Maier	Austria	6	3	2	1
Karl Schranz	Austria	6	3	2	1
Guy Périllat	France	6	2	3	1
**Marco Schwarz**	Austria	6	1	1	4
Günther Mader	Austria	6	0	1	5
Bode Miller	United States	5	4	1	0
Toni Seelos	Austria	5	4	1	0
**Vincent Kriechmayr**	Austria	5	2	2	1
James Couttet	France	5	1	2	2
Otto Furrer	Switzerland	5	1	2	2
**Loïc Meillard**	Switzerland	5	1	1	3

=== Women ===
Skier	Country	Total	Gold	Silver	Bronze
Christl Cranz (Note: Three medals from the non-recognized 1941 championships (2 golds and 1 silver) not included.)	Germany	15	12	3	0
**Mikaela Shiffrin**	United States	14	7	4	3
Marielle Goitschel	France	11	7	4	0
Anja Pärson	Sweden	11	7	1	3
Annemarie Moser-Pröll	Austria	9	5	2	2
Tina Maze	Slovenia	9	4	5	0
Hanni Wenzel	Liechtenstein	9	4	3	2
**Lara Gut-Behrami**	Switzerland	8	2	3	3
**Lindsey Vonn (Kildow)**	United States	8	2	3	3
Lisa Resch	Germany	8	1	4	3
Erika Hess	Switzerland	7	6	0	1
Renate Götschl	Austria	7	2	3	2
Käthe Grasegger (Note: One medal from the non-recognized 1941 championships (1 silver) not included.)	Germany	7	0	1	6
Pernilla Wiberg	Sweden	6	4	1	1
Inge Wersin-Lantschner	Austria	6	3	3	0
Vreni Schneider	Switzerland	6	3	2	1
**Wendy Holdener**	Switzerland	6	2	4	0
Annie Famose	France	6	1	2	3
Nicole Hosp	Austria	6	1	2	3
Janica Kostelić	Croatia	5	5	0	0
Trude Jochum-Beiser	Austria	5	3	2	0
Anna Fenninger	Austria	5	3	1	1
**Federica Brignone**	Italy	5	2	3	0
Anny Rüegg	Switzerland	5	2	1	2
Maria Höfl-Riesch	Germany	5	2	0	3
Frieda Dänzer	Switzerland	5	1	3	1
**Petra Vlhová**	Slovakia	5	1	3	1
Marlies Schild	Austria	5	1	2	2
**Corinne Suter**	Switzerland	5	1	2	2
Mateja Svet	Yugoslavia	5	1	1	3
Nini von Arx-Zogg	Switzerland	5	0	4	1
Julia Mancuso	United States	5	0	2	3
Anita Wachter	Austria	5	0	2	3

== Most titles per discipline ==
=== Men ===
Discipline	Skier	Country	Titles
Downhill	Walter Prager	Switzerland	2
Downhill	Zeno Colò	Italy	2
Downhill	Toni Sailer	Austria	2
Downhill	Jean-Claude Killy	France	2
Downhill	Bernhard Russi	Switzerland	2
Downhill	Aksel Lund Svindal	Norway	2
Slalom	Ingemar Stenmark	Sweden	3
Slalom	Marcel Hirscher	Austria	3
Combined	Marc Girardelli	Luxembourg	3
Combined	Kjetil André Aamodt	Norway	3
Giant slalom	Ted Ligety	United States	3
Super-G	Atle Skårdal	Norway	2
Super-G	Stephan Eberharter	Austria	2
Parallel	Mathieu Faivre	France	1
Parallel	Alexander Schmid	Germany	1
Mixed team	Marcel Hirscher	Austria	2
Mixed team	Philipp Schörghofer	Austria	2
Team combined	Franjo von Allmen	Switzerland	1
Team combined	Loïc Meillard	Switzerland	1

=== Women ===
Discipline	Skier	Country	Titles
Downhill	Christl Cranz	Germany	3
Downhill	Annemarie Moser-Pröll	Austria	3
Slalom	Christl Cranz	Germany	4
Slalom	Mikaela Shiffrin	United States	4
Combined	Christl Cranz	Germany	5
Giant slalom	Marielle Goitschel	France	2
Giant slalom	Vreni Schneider	Switzerland	2
Giant slalom	Deborah Compagnoni	Italy	2
Giant slalom	Anja Pärson	Sweden	2
Giant slalom	Tessa Worley	France	2
Super-G	Ulrike Maier	Austria	2
Super-G	Isolde Kostner	Italy	2
Super-G	Anja Pärson	Sweden	2
Parallel	Marta Bassino	Italy	1
Parallel	Katharina Liensberger	Austria	1
Parallel	Maria Therese Tviberg	Norway	1
Mixed team	Michaela Kirchgasser	Austria	3
Team combined	Breezy Johnson	United States	1
Team combined	Mikaela Shiffrin	United States	1

== Multiple individual discipline winners ==
Only seven skiers (three men and four women) have ever managed to win World championship in four or more different alpine skiing individual disciplines during their career, as listed in the table below. Anja Pärson of Sweden is the only skier in history to win World Championship golds in five individual disciplines.

=== Men ===
Skier	Period	Different discipline titles won	Wins	DH	SG	GS	SL	KB
(Austria) Toni Sailer	1956–1958	4	7	2	—	2	1	2
(France) Jean-Claude Killy	1966–1968	4	6	2	—	1	1	2
(Switzerland) Pirmin Zurbriggen	1985–1987	4	4	1	1	1	—	1

=== Women ===
Skier	Period	Different discipline titles won	Wins	DH	SG	GS	SL	KB
(Sweden) Anja Pärson	2001–2007	5	7	1	2	2	1	1
(United States) Mikaela Shiffrin	2013–2023	4	7	—	1	1	4	1
(France) Marielle Goitschel	1962–1968	4	7	1	—	2	1	3
(Slovenia) Tina Maze	2011–2015	4	4	1	1	1	—	1

== Medals by country ==
The tables for both genders include medals won at the nine Winter Olympics from 1948 through 1980, though these were also World Championships. The mixed team events is not included for both genders, therefore there is special table for these team competitions. Also, there are two cumulative medal tables – the first one includes medals won at the nine Winter Olympics from 1948 through 1980, the second one do not includes these medals. All tables are current through the 2025 Championships.

=== Men ===
Rank	Nation	Gold	Silver	Bronze	Total
1	Austria	57	59	52	168
2	Switzerland	39	39	44	122
3	France	26	28	19	73
4	Norway	24	21	13	58
5	Italy	15	14	15	44
6	United States	13	5	11	29
7	Germany	9	14	18	41
8	Sweden	6	3	8	17
9	Luxembourg	4	4	3	11
10	Canada	4	3	5	12
11	Liechtenstein	1	5	4	10
12	Croatia	1	2	2	5
13	Spain	1	0	1	2
14	Finland	1	0	0	1
15	Yugoslavia	0	1	2	3
16	Japan	0	1	1	2
16	Poland	0	1	1	2
16	Slovenia	0	1	1	2
19	Greece	0	1	0	1
20	Australia	0	0	1	1
Totals (20 entries)		201	202	201	604

=== Women ===
Rank	Nation	Gold	Silver	Bronze	Total
1	Austria	43	48	51	142
2	Switzerland	37	38	24	99
3	Germany	25	24	28	77
4	France	20	24	18	62
5	United States	19	23	27	69
6	Canada	12	4	3	19
7	Sweden	11	5	10	26
8	Italy	10	13	11	34
9	Slovenia	6	5	1	12
10	Croatia	5	0	0	5
11	Great Britain	4	4	3	11
11	Liechtenstein	4	4	3	11
13	Norway	2	2	10	14
14	Slovakia	1	3	1	5
15	Yugoslavia	1	2	3	6
16	Czech Republic	1	1	3	5
17	Australia	1	0	0	1
18	Finland	0	2	2	4
19	New Zealand	0	1	0	1
20	Soviet Union	0	0	2	2
Totals (20 entries)		202	203	200	605

=== Mixed team events ===
Rank	Nation	Gold	Silver	Bronze	Total
1	Austria	3	3	0	6
2	France	2	0	1	3
3	Switzerland	1	1	1	3
4	Norway	1	1	0	2
5	Germany	1	0	2	3
6	Italy	1	0	1	2
7	United States	1	0	0	1
8	Sweden	0	3	4	7
9	Canada	0	1	1	2
10	Slovakia	0	1	0	1
Totals (10 entries)		10	10	10	30

=== Total ===
Rank	Nation	Gold	Silver	Bronze	Total
1	Austria	103	110	103	316
2	Switzerland	77	78	69	224
3	France	48	52	38	138
4	Germany	35	38	48	121
5	United States	33	28	38	99
6	Norway	27	24	23	74
7	Italy	26	27	27	80
8	Sweden	17	11	22	50
9	Canada	16	8	9	33
10	Slovenia	6	6	2	14
11	Croatia	6	2	2	10
12	Liechtenstein	5	9	7	21
13	Great Britain	4	4	3	11
13	Luxembourg	4	4	3	11
15	Slovakia	1	4	1	6
16	Yugoslavia	1	3	5	9
17	Finland	1	2	2	5
18	Czech Republic	1	1	3	5
19	Australia	1	0	1	2
19	Spain	1	0	1	2
21	Japan	0	1	1	2
21	Poland	0	1	1	2
23	Greece	0	1	0	1
23	New Zealand	0	1	0	1
25	Soviet Union	0	0	2	2
Totals (25 entries)		413	415	411	1,239

=== Total (not including 1948–1980 Winter Olympics) ===
Rank	Nation	Gold	Silver	Bronze	Total
1	Austria	89	93	85	267
2	Switzerland	67	69	61	197
3	France	38	44	30	112
4	Germany	31	32	44	107
5	United States	29	21	34	84
6	Norway	26	23	22	71
7	Italy	23	24	23	70
8	Sweden	15	11	20	46
9	Canada	13	7	7	27
10	Slovenia	6	6	2	14
11	Croatia	6	2	2	10
12	Great Britain	4	4	3	11
12	Luxembourg	4	4	3	11
14	Liechtenstein	3	7	5	15
15	Slovakia	1	4	1	6
16	Yugoslavia	1	3	5	9
17	Finland	1	2	2	5
18	Czech Republic	1	1	3	5
19	Australia	1	0	1	2
20	Poland	0	1	1	2
21	Greece	0	1	0	1
21	New Zealand	0	1	0	1
23	Japan	0	0	1	1
23	Soviet Union	0	0	1	1
23	Spain	0	0	1	1
Totals (25 entries)		359	360	357	1,076

== See also ==
- List of FIS Alpine World Ski Championships medalists
- Alpine skiing at the Winter Olympics
- Alpine skiing at the Winter Paralympics
- Alpine skiing at the Youth Olympic Games
- Alpine skiing World Cup
- Italy at the FIS Alpine World Ski Championships
- World Para Alpine Skiing Championships
- World Junior Alpine Skiing Championships
