= FIS Alpine World Ski Championships 1937 =

Skiing event in Chamonix, France

- Host city: Chamonix
- Country: France
- Events: 6
- Opening: 13 February 1937
- Closing: 15 February 1937
- Opened by: Albert François Lebrun

The FIS Alpine World Ski Championships 1937 in alpine skiing were the seventh edition of the competition, organized by the International Ski Federation (FIS), and were held in Chamonix, France in February 1937.

== Medal summary ==
=== Men's events ===
Event	Gold	Silver	Bronze
Downhill	Émile Allais (FRA)	Maurice Lafforgue (FRA); Giacinto Sertorelli (ITA)	—
Slalom	Émile Allais (FRA)	Wilhelm Walch (AUT)	Roman Wörndle (GER)
Combined	Émile Allais (FRA)	Maurice Lafforgue (FRA)	Willi Steuri (SUI)

=== Women's events ===
Event	Gold	Silver	Bronze
Downhill	Christl Cranz (GER)	Nini Arx-Zogg (SUI)	Käthe Grasegger (GER)
Slalom	Christl Cranz (GER)	Käthe Grasegger (GER)	Lisa Resch (GER)
Combined	Christl Cranz (GER)	Nini Arx-Zogg (SUI)	Käthe Grasegger (GER)

== Medal table ==
* Host nation (France)

Rank	Nation	Gold	Silver	Bronze	Total
1	France (FRA)*	3	2	0	5
2	Germany (GER)	3	1	4	8
3	Switzerland (SUI)	0	2	1	3
4	Austria (AUT)	0	1	0	1
4	Italy (ITA)	0	1	0	1
Totals (5 entries)		6	7	5	18
