= Rudolph Matt =

Austrian alpine skier (1909–1993)

Medal record

Men's alpine skiing

Representing Austria

World Championships
| Gold medal – first place | 1936 Innsbruck | Slalom |

Rudolph Matt (10 September 1909 in St. Anton am Arlberg – 18 November 1993 in Innsbruck) was an Austrian alpine skier and world champion.

Matt became a world champion in the slalom in Innsbruck in 1936, before fellow Austrian Eberhard Kneissl, and finished 6th in the downhill and 4th in the combined event.

At the world championships in Engelberg in 1939 he finished 4th in the slalom.

During the Second World War, Matt escaped to Mount Cranmore in New Hampshire.
