= 1938 Women's Western Open =

Golf tournament

Coordinates: 38.781856°N 104.848731°W

The 1938 Women's Western Open was a golf competition held at Broadmoor Golf Club in Colorado Springs, Colorado. It was the 9th edition of the Women's Western Open. Bea Barrett won the championship in match play competition by defeating Helen Hofmann in the final match, 6 and 4.
