= 1939 Currie Cup =

Domestic rugby union competition

- Countries: South Africa
- Champions: Transvaal (2nd title)
- Runners-up: Western Province

The 1939 Currie Cup was the 20th edition of the Currie Cup, the premier domestic rugby union competition in South Africa.

The tournament was won by Transvaal for the second time; they beat Western Province 17–6 in the final in Cape Town. This was the first time in the history of the competition that a final was held to determine the winner.

== Tables ==
=== Northern Section ===
1939 Currie Cup
Pos	Team	P	W	D	L	PF	PA	PD	Pts
1	Transvaal	5	4	0	1	110	63	+47	8
2	Natal	5	3	1	1	73	52	+21	7
3	Griqualand West	5	2	1	2	62	76	-14	5
4	Northern Transvaal	5	2	0	3	48	53	-5	4
5	Free State	5	2	0	3	57	67	-10	4
6	Western Transvaal	5	1	0	4	49	88	-39	2
Source: rugbyarchive.net Key: P = matches played, W = Won, D = Drawn, L = Lost, PF = Points for, PA = Points against, PD = Points difference, Pts = Tournament points The top-placed teams advanced to the Currie Cup grand final

=== Southern Section ===
1939 Currie Cup
Pos	Team	P	W	D	L	PF	PA	PD	Pts
1	Western Province	5	5	0	0	113	29	+84	10
2	Border	5	3	0	2	112	31	+81	6
3	Boland	5	3	0	2	60	30	+30	6
4	Eastern Province	5	3	0	2	55	63	-8	6
5	South Western Districts	5	1	0	4	22	120	-98	2
6	North Eastern Districts	5	0	0	5	12	101	-89	0
Source: rugbyarchive.net Key: P = matches played, W = Won, D = Drawn, L = Lost, PF = Points for, PA = Points against, PD = Points difference, Pts = Tournament points The top-placed teams advanced to the Currie Cup grand final

== Fixtures and Results ==
=== Northern Section ===
20 May 1939	Northern Transvaal	12 - 3	Orange Free State	Pretoria
				Referee: Nico Bosman

26 August 1939	Griqualand West	10 - 3	Northern Transvaal	Kimberley
				Referee: JT Thompson

1939	Griqualand West	13 - 13	Natal

1939	Griqualand West	15 - 10	Orange Free State

1939	Natal	14 - 3	Western Transvaal

1939	Natal	18 - 8	Transvaal

12 August 1939	Northern Transvaal	8 - 15	Natal	Pretoria
				Referee: Nico Bosman

13 June 1939	Northern Transvaal	16 - 8	Western Transvaal	Potchefstroom
				Referee: U Schmidt

1939	Orange Free State	20 - 13	Natal

1939	Orange Free State	11 - 3	Western Transvaal

10 June 1939	Transvaal	17 - 9	Northern Transvaal	Johannesburg
				Referee: Ivan Marais

1939	Transvaal	29 - 9	Griqualand West

1939	Transvaal	24 - 13	Orange Free State

1939	Transvaal	32 - 14	Western Transvaal

1939	Western Transvaal	21 - 15	Griqualand West

=== Southern Section ===
1939	Boland	11 - 0	Border

1939	Boland	16 - 0	North Eastern Districts

1939	Boland	24 - 3	South Western Districts

1939	Border	33 - 3	Eastern Province

1939	Border	32 - 0	North Eastern Districts

1939	Border	40 - 0	South Western Districts

1939	Eastern Province	11 - 0	Boland

1939	Eastern Province	16 - 3	North Eastern Districts

1939	Eastern Province	17 - 3	South Western Districts

1939	South Western Districts	11 - 9	North Eastern Districts

1939	Western Province	16 - 9	Boland

1939	Western Province	17 - 7	Border

1939	Western Province	24 - 8	Eastern Province

1939	Western Province	26 - 0	North Eastern Districts

1939	Western Province	30 - 5	South Western Districts

=== Final ===
1939	Western Province	6 - 17	Transvaal	Cape Town

== See also ==
- Currie Cup
