= Axams =

- Municipality
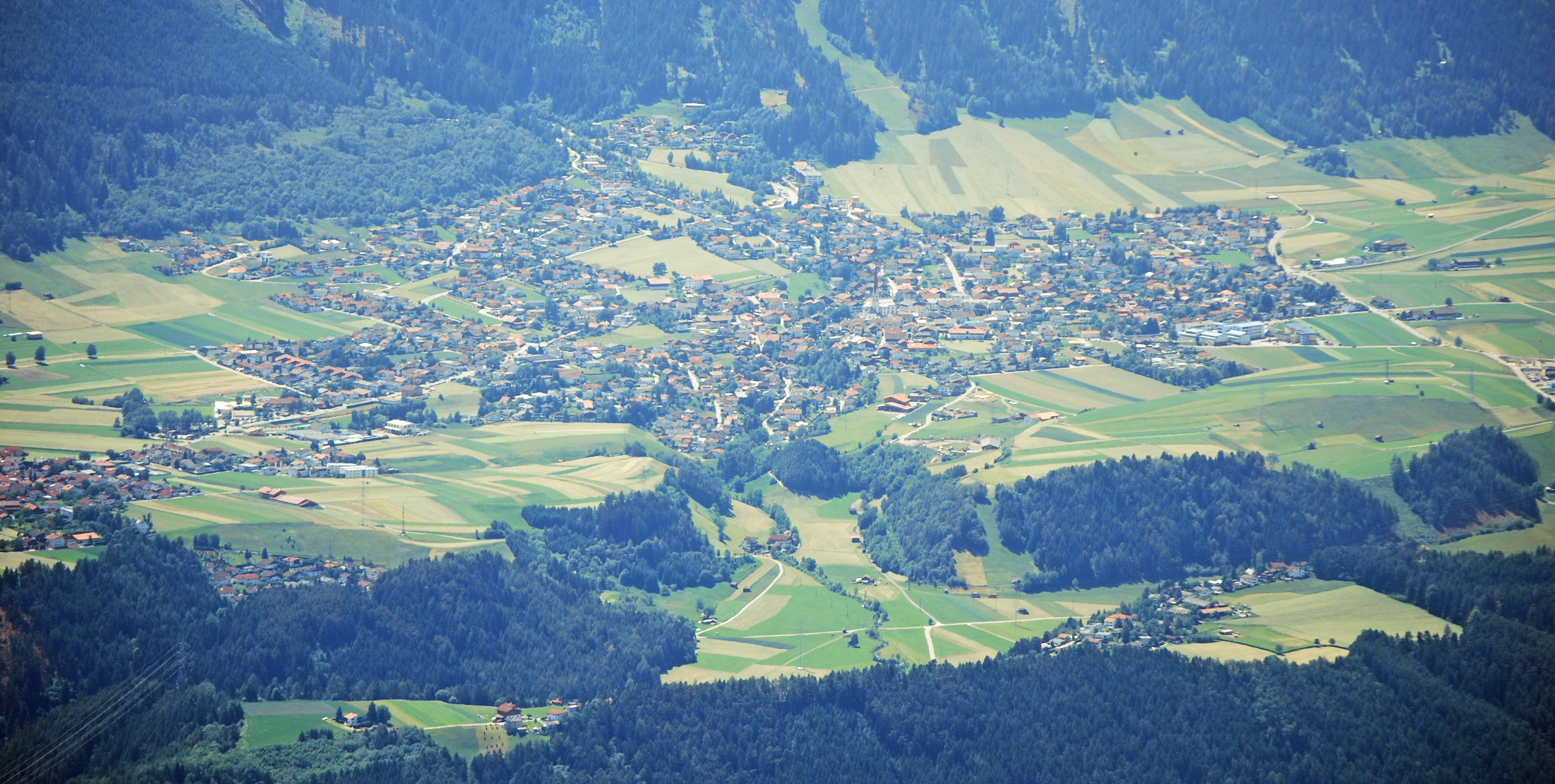

- Coat of arms

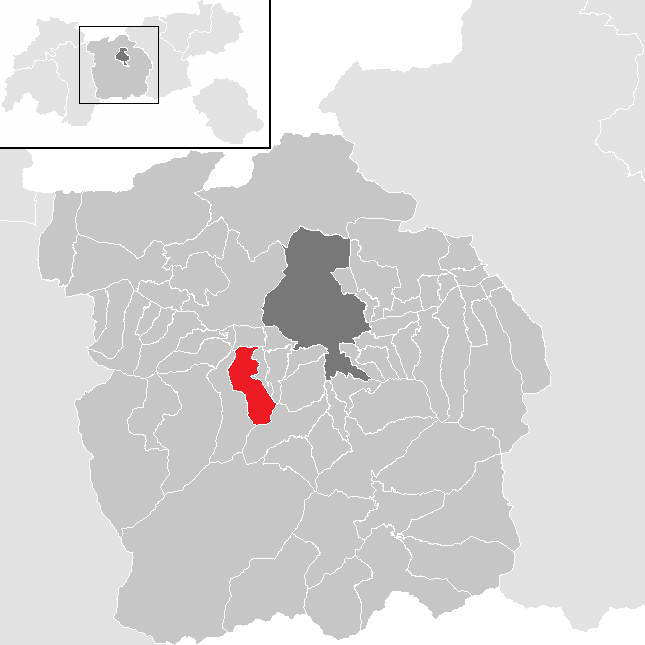
- Location in the district

- Location within Austria
- Coordinates: 47°13′00″N 11°18′00″E
- Country: Austria
- State: Tyrol
- District: Innsbruck Land

Government
  - Mayor: Thomas Suitner (Frischer Wind)

Area
  - Total: 22.16 km^{2} (8.56 sq mi)
- Elevation: 874 m (2,867 ft)

Population (2021-01-01)
  - Total: 6,111
  - Density: 275.8/km^{2} (714.2/sq mi)
- Time zone: UTC+1 (CET)
  - Summer (DST): UTC+2 (CEST)
- Postal code: 6094
- Area code: 05234
- Vehicle registration: IL
- Website: www.axams.tirol.gv.at

Axams is a municipality in the district of Innsbruck Land in the Austrian state of Tyrol.

The name "Axams" has a Celtic origin and means something like „Place in the height“. The emblem has a golden top on blue ground. In the previous century flax was important for the village. Axams grew in population in the last years.

== Population ==
View source data.

== Geography ==
The community is located in the western low mountain range about 10 km southwest of Innsbruck. Immediate neighboring communities are Oberperfuss, Grinzens, Götzens, Kematen in Tirol, Unterperfuss and Birgitz. South of the main village are the Axamer Lizum and the Kalkkögel, which still belong to the municipal area. Further north lies the Zirler Berg. In the west the Sendersbach and in the east the Ruifachbach flow past Axams.

== Recent History ==
From 1904/1905 the electrification of Axams began.

In the course of the First World War, the church bells were handed over in 1917 for the extraction of war metal.

Since 1926 there is a regulated bus service, one year later the regional children's home was opened.

The parish church received a new bell in 1948 and it was restored again between 1956 and 1958. In 1962–1963, the Lizum was connected to Axams by the construction of a road.

In 1964, almost all of the alpine disciplines of the Olympic Winter Games took place there, as well as at the 1976 Winter Games.

In 1980 Axams became the seat of the deanery of the same name.

In 1983 a devastating debris flow occurred here.

In 1998 the Lizum gets a snow-making system.

In 2007, the main school was renovated and expanded.

In 2009–2015, a merger of Axamer Lizum with Schlick 2000 was hotly and controversially discussed until the Tyrolean provincial government announced that the project was not legally feasible.

In February 2016, plans for a small hydroelectric power plant at the southern edge of the village and end of the Axamer Tal were publicized.
