= Käthe Grasegger =

German alpine skier (1917–2001)

Medal record

Representing Germany

Women's Alpine skiing

Winter Olympics
Silver medal – second place	1936 Garmisch-Partenkirchen	Combined

World Championship
Silver medal – second place	1937 Chamonix	Slalom
Bronze medal – third place	1935 Mürren	Slalom
Bronze medal – third place	1935 Mürren	Combined
Bronze medal – third place	1937 Chamonix	Downhill
Bronze medal – third place	1937 Chamonix	Combined
Bronze medal – third place	1938 Engelberg	Downhill
Bronze medal – third place	1938 Engelberg	Combined

Käthe Grasegger (later Deuschl; 19 June 1917 – 28 August 2001) was a German alpine skier who competed in the 1936 Winter Olympics.

She was born in Partenkirchen.

In 1936 she won the silver medal in the alpine skiing combined event.
