= FIS Alpine World Ski Championships 1936 =

Skiing event in Innsbruck, Austria

- Host city: Innsbruck
- Country: Austria
- Events: 6
- Opening: 21 February 1936
- Closing: 22 February 1936
- Opened by: Wilhelm Miklas

The FIS Alpine World Ski Championships 1936 in alpine skiing were the sixth edition of the competition, organized by the International Ski Federation (FIS), and were held in Innsbruck, Austria in February 1936.

== Medal summary ==
=== Men's events ===
| Event | Gold | Silver | Bronze |
|---|---|---|---|
| Downhill | Rudolf Rominger (SUI) | Giacinto Sertorelli (ITA) | Heinz von Allmen (SUI) |
| Slalom | Rudolph Matt (AUT) | Eberhard Kneissl (AUT) | Rudolf Rominger (SUI) |
| Combined | Rudolf Rominger (SUI) | Heinz von Allmen (SUI) | Eberhard Kneissl (AUT) |

=== Women's events ===
| Event | Gold | Silver | Bronze |
|---|---|---|---|
| Downhill | Evelyn Pinching (GBR) | Elvira Osirnig (SUI) | Nini Arx-Zogg (SUI) |
| Slalom | Gerda Paumgarten (AUT) | Evelyn Pinching (GBR) | Gretl Weikert (AUT) |
| Combined | Evelyn Pinching (GBR) | Elvira Osirnig (SUI) | Gerda Paumgarten (AUT) |

== Medal table ==
* Host nation (Austria)

| Rank | Nation | Gold | Silver | Bronze | Total |
|---|---|---|---|---|---|
| 1 | Switzerland (SUI) | 2 | 3 | 3 | 8 |
| 2 | Austria (AUT)* | 2 | 1 | 3 | 6 |
| 3 | Great Britain (GBR) | 2 | 1 | 0 | 3 |
| 4 | Italy (ITA) | 0 | 1 | 0 | 1 |
| Totals (4 entries) | | 6 | 6 | 6 | 18 |
