= Josef Jennewein =

German alpine skier and World War II flying ace

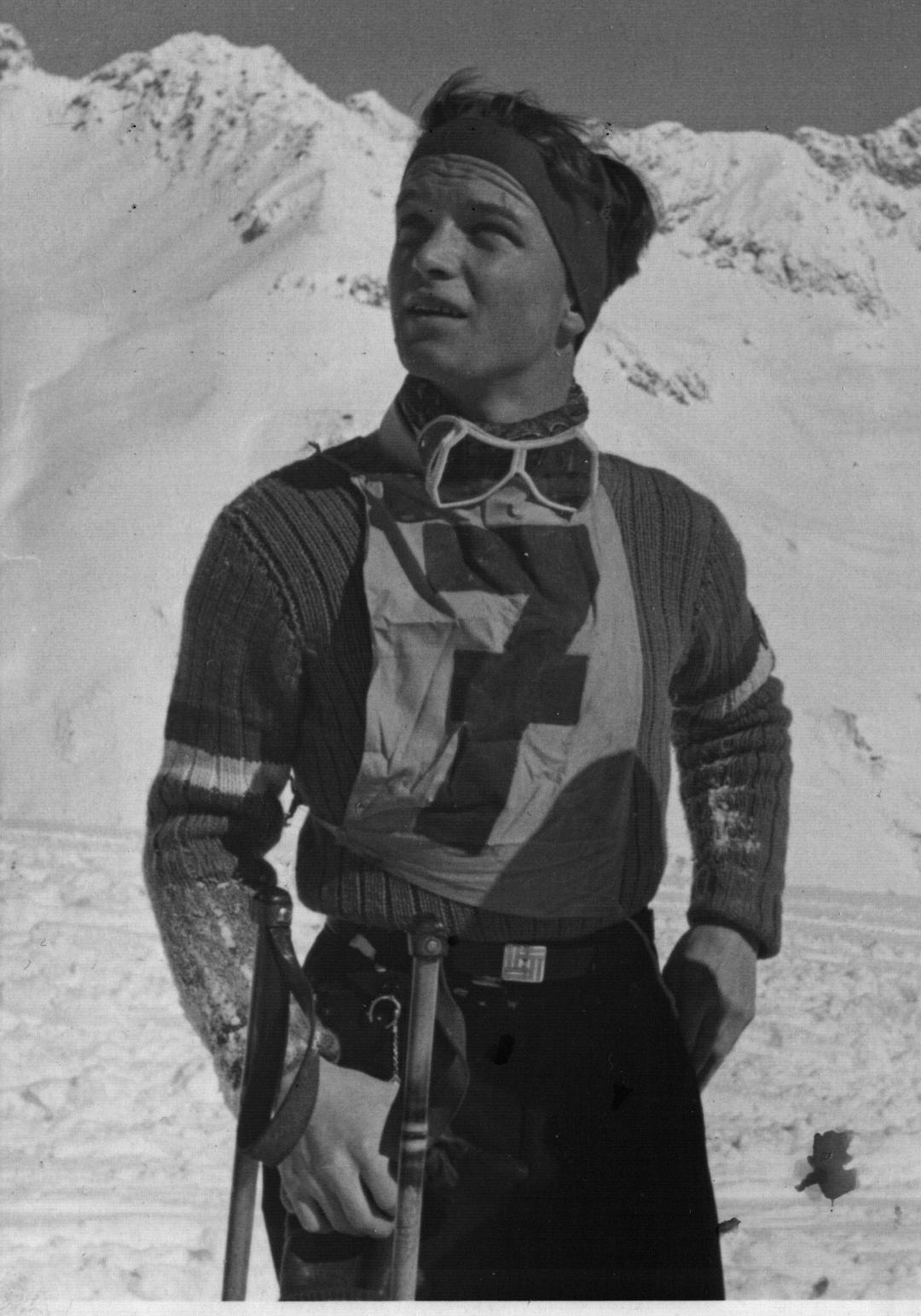
- Born: 21 November 1919; Sankt Anton am Arlberg, Austria
- Died: 27 July 1943 (aged 23) missing in action near Orel, Soviet Union
- Military career
- Allegiance: Nazi Germany
- Branch: Luftwaffe
- Rank: Leutnant (second lieutenant)
- Unit: JG 51
- Conflicts: See battles World War II: Battle of Britain; Eastern Front; Operation Barbarossa; Battle of Kursk
- Awards: Knight's Cross of the Iron Cross
- Sports career
- Sport: Alpine skiing
Medal record
Representing Germany
Men's Alpine skiing
World Championship
Gold medal – first place	1939 Zakopane	Combined
Silver medal – second place	1939 Zakopane	Slalom
Silver medal – second place	1939 Zakopane	Downhill

Josef Jennewein (21 November 1919 – 27 July 1943) was an Austrian-German alpine skier and world champion. During World War II, he served first in the Wehrmacht and then in the Luftwaffe, and was credited with 86 air victories. He was awarded the Knight's Cross of the Iron Cross of Nazi Germany.

== Early life and sports career ==
Jennewein was born on 21 November 1919 at St Anton in the Tyrolean Alps, Austria. He became a world champion in the combined event in Zakopane in 1939, and received silver medals in slalom and in downhill. In 1941 Jennewein participated at the FIS Alpine World Ski Championships 1941 in Cortina d'Ampezzo, Italy and won gold medals in downhill and the combined event. In 1946, the results were cancelled by the FIS because of the limited number of participants from only German-friendly countries during World War II.

== World War II ==
Jennewein joined the Luftwaffe as a fighter pilot and was posted to 4. Einsatzstaffel of Jagdfliegerschule 5 (JFS 5—5th Fighter Pilot School). In June 1941, most of the Luftwaffe fighter units were transferred east in preparation for Operation Barbarossa, the invasion of the Soviet Union launched on 22 June 1941. To augment the remaining fighter units fighting on the Western Front, JFS 5 was tasked with the creation of a fourth squadron named 4. Einsatzstaffel — action or combat squadron — in June 1941. The Einsatzstaffel was placed under the command of Oberleutnant Fülbert Zink. In early July, the Einsatzstaffel transferred to Octeville-sur-Mer, north of Le Havre. There, 4. Einsatzstaffel was subordinated to the Stab (headquarters unit) of Jagdgeschwader 2 "Richthofen" (JG 2—2nd Fighter Wing) and flew fighter protection in the area of Le Havre. Initially, 4. Einsatzstaffel was equipped with the Messerschmitt Bf 109 E-4 and E-7, later with the Bf 109 F-1 and F-2.

On 20 September 1941, the Royal Air Force (RAF) flew three "Circus" operations named No. 100A, 100B and 100C, against various targets in northern France. Circus No. 100A headed for the Hazebrouck marshalling yards, "Circus" No. 100B attacked the Abbeville marshalling yards, and Circus 100C targeted the shipyards at Rouen. Following the day's actions, pilots on both sides overclaimed the number of aerial victories. That day, flying his fourth combat mission, Jennewein claimed three Supermarine Spitfire fighters shot down near Fécamp. On 15 October, the RAF flew the "Ramrod" No. 69 mission against the Le Havre docks. Twelve Bristol Blenheim bombers from Westhampnett, escorted by Spitfire fighters from No. 234 Squadron, were intercepted by Bf 109 Luftwaffe fighters. In this encounter, Jennewein claimed the destruction of a Spitfire fighter and a Blenheim bomber.

=== Eastern Front ===
On 28 January 1942, Jennewein was posted to 2. Staffel (2nd squadron) of Jagdgeschwader 51 (JG 51—51st Fighter Wing) and transferred to the Eastern Front. At the time, 2. Staffel was commanded by Oberleutnant Friedhelm Höschen who was transferred in March and handed command of the Staffel to Leutnant Erwin Fleig. The Staffel was subordinated to I. Gruppe (1st group) of JG 51 and was based at Staraya Russa.

On 10 August, I. Gruppe of JG 51 was withdrawn from the Eastern Front and sent to Jesau, near present-day Bagrationovsk, to Heiligenbeil, present-day Mamonovo, to be reequipped with the Focke-Wulf Fw 190 A. The pilots were sent to Ergänzungs-Jagdgruppe West based at Cazaux, France for conversion training. Conversion completed, the Gruppe then relocated to Lyuban on 10 September. Here they came under the control of Army Group North and fought in the area south of Lake Ladoga.

By the end of July 1942, when he was posted to serve as a flight instructor, he had added 12 Russian aircraft to his tally. He returned to 2./JG 51 before the end of the year, starting a surprising sequence of multiple victories. On 18 January 1943, as a Feldwebel, flying an Fw 190 as a wingman of Leutnant Joachim Brendel, he attacked a formation of nine Petlyakov Pe-2 bombers from 202 BAP (Bombardirovochnyy Aviatsionyy Polk—bomber aviation regiment), in the area of Velikiye Luki, and claimed five kills in five minutes (Brendel claimed three, actual Soviet losses were six).

On 27 July 1943, Jennewein claimed his 86th and last aerial victory when he shot down an Ilyushin Il-2 ground-attack aircraft. Shortly after, he was posted as missing in action when his Fw 190 A-6 (Werknummer 550182 (Note: According to a document provided by the Deutsche Dienststelle (WASt), the Werknummer may have been 550181.) —factory number) was shot down by another Il-2 in aerial combat northwest of Mtsensk.

== Summary of military career ==
=== Aerial victory claims ===
According to US historian David T. Zabecki, Jennewein was credited with 86 aerial victories. Spick also lists Jennewein with 86 aerial victories, including five during the Battle of Britain and a further 81 on the Eastern Front, claimed in 271 combat missions, and a mission-to-claim ratio of 3.15. Mathews and Foreman, authors of Luftwaffe Aces - Biographies and Victory Claims, researched the German Federal Archives and found records for 83 aerial victory claims. This number includes five on the Western Front and 78 on the Eastern Front.

Victory claims were logged to a map-reference (PQ = Planquadrat), for example "PQ 44234". The Luftwaffe grid map (Jägermeldenetz) covered all of Europe, western Russia and North Africa and was composed of rectangles measuring 15 minutes of latitude by 30 minutes of longitude, an area of about 360 square miles (930 km^{2}). These sectors were then subdivided into 36 smaller units to give a location area 3 km × 4 km (1.9 mi × 2.5 mi) in size.

Chronicle of aerial victories
This and the ♠ (Ace of spades) indicates those aerial victories which made Jennewein an "ace-in-a-day", a term which designates a fighter pilot who has shot down five or more airplanes in a single day. This and the ? (question mark) indicates information discrepancies listed by Prien, Stemmer, Rodeike, Bock, Mathews and Foreman.
Claim	Date	Time	Type	Location	Unit	Claim	Date	Time	Type	Location	Unit
– Claims with Jagdfliegerschule 5 in the West – 1 July 1942 – 31 December 1941
1	20 September 1941	—	Spitfire	northwest of Fécamp	4.(Eins.)/JFS 5	4	15 October 1941	—	Spitfire	Le Havre	4.(Eins.)/JFS 5
2	20 September 1941	—	Spitfire	northwest of Fécamp	4.(Eins.)/JFS 5	5	15 October 1941	—	Blenheim	Le Havre	4.(Eins.)/JFS 5
3	20 September 1941	—	Spitfire	northwest of Fécamp	4.(Eins.)/JFS 5						
– Claims with Jagdgeschwader 51 "Mölders" on the Eastern Front – 6 December 1941 – 30 April 1942
6	21 March 1942	07:05	I-61 (MiG-3)		2./JG 51	9	5 April 1942	06:10	I-61 (MiG-3)		2./JG 51
7	29 March 1942	10:55	I-61? (Note: According to Mathews and Foreman claimed as a Lavochkin-Gorbunov-Gudkov LaGG-3.)		2./JG 51	10	5 April 1942	06:40	I-61 (MiG-3)		2./JG 51
8	30 March 1942	12:00	I-17 (MiG-1)		2./JG 51						
– Claims with Jagdgeschwader 51 "Mölders" on the Eastern Front – Eastern Front — 1 May 1942 – 3 February 1943
11	3 June 1942	19:22	MiG-1		2./JG 51	14	3 July 1942	13:25	MiG-3		2./JG 51
12	11 June 1942	07:57	Yak-1		2./JG 51	15	11 July 1942	06:00	MiG-3	PQ 44234; 25 km (16 mi) north-northeast of Zhizdra	2./JG 51
13	2 July 1942	15:00	LaGG-3		2./JG 51						
According to Prien, Stemmer, Rodeike and Bock, Jennewein claimed one undocumented aerial victory in the timeframe 29 May an 15 September 1942.
17	26 July 1942	14:50	Pe-2		2./JG 51	22♠	18 January 1943	08:03	Pe-2	PQ 07783	2./JG 51
18	10 January 1943	13:30? (Note: According to Mathews and Foreman claimed at 13:20.)	Il-2	PQ 01564	2./JG 51	23♠	18 January 1943	08:05	Pe-2	PQ 07783	2./JG 51
19	16 January 1943	08:15	MiG-3	PQ 17712, Velikiye Luki; 35 km (22 mi) east-northeast of Toropa	2./JG 51	24♠	18 January 1943	08:06	Pe-2	PQ 07793	2./JG 51
20♠	18 January 1943	08:01	Pe-2	PQ 07741	2./JG 51	25	27 January 1943	09:15	MiG-3	PQ 17724; 25 km (16 mi) east-northeast of Toropa	2./JG 51
21♠	18 January 1943	08:02	Pe-2	PQ 07741	2./JG 51	26	30 January 1943	08:40	Pe-2	PQ 63151; 15 km (9.3 mi) southeast of Orel	2./JG 51
– Claims with Jagdgeschwader 51 "Mölders" on the Eastern Front – Eastern Front — 4 February – 27 July 1943
27	22 February 1943	05:51	La-5	PQ 35 Ost 64473; 15 km (9.3 mi) south of Arsenyevo	2./JG 51	57	16 May 1943	04:25	LaGG-3	PQ 35 Ost 63844; 5 km (3.1 mi) southeast of Zolotukhino	2./JG 51
28	22 February 1943	06:06	Il-2	PQ 35 Ost 64611; 20 km (12 mi) north of Mtsensk	2./JG 51	58	22 May 1943	04:25	P-39	PQ 35 Ost 63574; 20 km (12 mi) south-southeast of Trosna	2./JG 51
29	22 February 1943	06:20	Il-2	PQ 35 Ost 64612; 20 km (12 mi) north of Mtsensk	2./JG 51	59? (Note: This claim is not listed by Mathews and Foreman.)	22 May 1943	—	P-39		2./JG 51
30♠	23 February 1943	10:40	Pe-2	PQ 35 Ost 44292; 15 km (9.3 mi) northeast of Zhizdra	2./JG 51	60?	28 May 1943	17:47	La-5	east of Orel	1./JG 51
31♠	23 February 1943	10:42	Pe-2	PQ 35 Ost 54123; 20 km (12 mi) south-southwest of Sukhinichi	2./JG 51	61	30 May 1943	07:25	La-5	PQ 35 Ost 63553; 15 km (9.3 mi) west of Maloarkhangelsk	1./JG 51
32♠	23 February 1943	10:45	Pe-2	PQ 35 Ost 54114; 20 km (12 mi) southwest of Sukhinichi	2./JG 51	62	2 June 1943	04:25	P-39	PQ 35 Ost 63553; 15 km (9.3 mi) west of Maloarkhangelsk	1./JG 51
33♠	23 February 1943	10:48	Pe-2	PQ 35 Ost 54111; 20 km (12 mi) southwest of Sukhinichi	2./JG 51	63	2 June 1943	11:15	LaGG-3	PQ 35 Ost 63534 vicinity of Maloarkhangelsk	1./JG 51
34♠	23 February 1943	10:55	Pe-2	PQ 35 Ost 54143; 25 km (16 mi) northeast of Zhizdra	2./JG 51	64	13 July 1943	18:45	La-5	southeast of Mtsensk	1./JG 51
35♠	24 February 1943	10:41	Il-2	PQ 35 Ost 44252; 15 km (9.3 mi) north of Zhizdra	2./JG 51	65	13 July 1943	19:00	La-5	southwest of Grinow	1./JG 51
36♠	24 February 1943	10:43	Il-2	PQ 35 Ost 44251; 15 km (9.3 mi) north of Zhizdra	2./JG 51	66	14 July 1943	19:25	LaGG-3	east of Mitejewo	1./JG 51
37♠	24 February 1943	13:40	La-5	PQ 35 Ost 64611; 20 km (12 mi) north of Mtsensk	2./JG 51	67	14 July 1943	19:40	LaGG-3	east of Gilkowa	1./JG 51
38♠	24 February 1943	13:42	Il-2	PQ 35 Ost 64613; 20 km (12 mi) north of Mtsensk	2./JG 51	68	16 July 1943	07:10	La-5	northwest of Baryomsky	1./JG 51
39♠	24 February 1943	13:45	Il-2	PQ 35 Ost 64611; 20 km (12 mi) north of Mtsensk	2./JG 51	69	17 July 1943	08:50	LaGG-3	PQ 35 Ost 54725; 25 km (16 mi) southwest of Kozelsk	2./JG 51
40♠	24 February 1943	13:51	Il-2	PQ 35 Ost 64621; 20 km (12 mi) north-northeast of Mtsensk	2./JG 51	70	17 July 1943	16:30	La-5	PQ 35 Ost 55858; 15 km (9.3 mi) north of Kozelsk	2./JG 51
41♠	24 February 1943	13:53	Il-2	PQ 35 Ost 64633; 20 km (12 mi) northwest of Lipitsy	2./JG 51	71	17 July 1943	19:00	LaGG-3	PQ 35 Ost 54642; 20 km (12 mi) northeast of Znamenskoye	2./JG 51
42	9 March 1943	11:10	LaGG-3	PQ 35 Ost 44223; 25 km (16 mi) north of Zhizdra	2./JG 51	72	18 July 1943	14:32	Il-2 m.H. (Note: The "m.H." refers to an Ilyushin Il-2 with rear gunner (mit Heckschütze).)	PQ 35 Ost 54812; 10 km (6.2 mi) east of Znamenskoye	2./JG 51
43	10 March 1943	15:55	LaGG-3	PQ 35 Ost 55713; 20 km (12 mi) northwest of Sukhinichi	2./JG 51	73	18 July 1943	14:34	Il-2 m.H.	PQ 35 Ost 54643; 20 km (12 mi) northeast of Znamenskoye	2./JG 51
44	21 March 1943	06:25	La-5	PQ 35 Ost 45363; 35 km (22 mi) northeast of Spas-Demensk	2./JG 51	74	19 July 1943	09:30	La-5	PQ 35 Ost 64881; 15 km (9.3 mi) northeast of Znamenskoye	2./JG 51
45	23 March 1943	11:05	Yak-1	PQ 35 Ost 53591; 15 km (9.3 mi) north-northeast of Dmitriyev-Lgovsky	2./JG 51	75	20 July 1943	14:40	LaGG-3	PQ 35 Ost 64864; 25 km (16 mi) southeast of Mtsensk	2./JG 51
46	27 March 1943	09:08	Pe-2	PQ 35 Ost 53484; 15 km (9.3 mi) south-southwest of Kromy	2./JG 51	76	20 July 1943	14:50	LaGG-3	PQ 35 Ost 64876; 10 km (6.2 mi) north of Zalegoshch	2./JG 51
47♠	6 May 1943	13:30	Pe-2	PQ 35 Ost 64762; 20 km (12 mi) north-northwest of Zalegoshch	2./JG 51	77♠	21 July 1943	13:25	Il-2 m.H.	PQ 35 Ost 63164; 10 km (6.2 mi) northeast of Orel	2./JG 51
48♠	6 May 1943	13:31	Pe-2	PQ 35 Ost 64762; 20 km (12 mi) north-northwest of Zalegoshch	2./JG 51	78♠	21 July 1943	13:27	Il-2 m.H.	PQ 35 Ost 63165; 10 km (6.2 mi) northeast of Orel	2./JG 51
49♠	6 May 1943	13:32	Pe-2	PQ 35 Ost 64763; 20 km (12 mi) north-northwest of Zalegoshch	2./JG 51	79♠	21 July 1943	13:28	Il-2 m.H.	PQ 35 Ost 63243; 10 km (6.2 mi) south of Zalegoshch	2./JG 51
50♠	6 May 1943	13:38	Pe-2	PQ 35 Ost 64844; 20 km (12 mi) south of Mtsensk	2./JG 51	80♠	21 July 1943	13:29	Il-2 m.H.	PQ 35 Ost 63247; 10 km (6.2 mi) south of Zalegoshch	2./JG 51
51♠	6 May 1943	13:42	Il-2	PQ 35 Ost 64813; 10 km (6.2 mi) south of Mtsensk	2./JG 51	81♠	21 July 1943	13:30	La-5	PQ 35 Ost 63251; 15 km (9.3 mi) southeast of Zalegoshch	2./JG 51
52	8 May 1943	04:30	Pe-2	PQ 35 Ost 54731 vicinity of Znamenskoye	2./JG 51	82	24 July 1943	13:30	Il-2 m.H.	PQ 35 Ost 63271; 20 km (12 mi) south of Zalegoshch	2./JG 51
53	8 May 1943	07:34	Il-2	PQ 35 Ost 63324 vicinity of Glazunowka	2./JG 51	83	26 July 1943	10:38	Il-2 m.H.	PQ 35 Ost 63145; 10 km (6.2 mi) south of Orel	2./JG 51
54	8 May 1943	07:38	La-5	PQ 35 Ost 63321 vicinity of Glazunowka	2./JG 51	84	26 July 1943	10:44	Il-2 m.H.	PQ 35 Ost 53296; 15 km (9.3 mi) north-northeast of Kromy	2./JG 51
55	8 May 1943	07:41	La-5	PQ 35 Ost 63324 vicinity of Glazunowka	2./JG 51	85	26 July 1943	11:10	La-5	PQ 35 Ost 63189 vicinity of Zmiyovka	2./JG 51
56	12 May 1943	08:01	La-5	PQ 35 Ost 63761; 5 km (3.1 mi) southwest of Zolotukhino	2./JG 51	86	27 July 1943	11:25	Il-2 m.H.	PQ 35 Ost 54464; 15 km (9.3 mi) northwest of Bolkhov	2./JG 51

=== Awards ===
- Iron Cross (1939) 2nd and 1st Class
- Honor Goblet of the Luftwaffe on 1 March 1943 as Oberfeldwebel and pilot
- German Cross in Gold on 12 April 1943 as Oberfeldwebel in the I./Jagdgeschwader 51
- Knight's Cross of the Iron Cross on 5 December 1943 (posthumously) as Leutnant and pilot in the 1./Jagdgeschwader 51 "Mölders" (Note: According to Scherzer as Oberfeldwebel and pilot in the I./Jagdgeschwader 51 "Mölders".)

== See also ==
- List of people who disappeared
