= Rudolf Cranz =

German alpine skier (1918–1941)

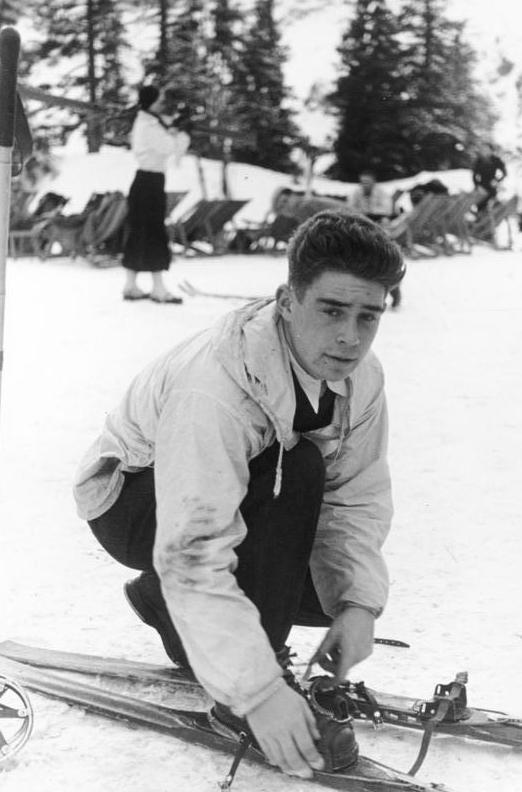
Rudolf Cranz at the 1936 Winter Olympics

Heinz-Rudolf Cranz (2 September 1918 – 22 June 1941) was a German alpine skier who competed in the 1936 Winter Olympics.

He was born in Uccle, Belgium and died in Różaniec, Przemyśl Voivodeship. He was the younger brother of Christl Cranz.

In 1936 he finished sixth in the alpine skiing combined event.

Only a few months after his last German National in 1941 Cranz was killed-in-action during World War II on his first day of battle on the Russian campaign in Rosaniec (Poland), where he served as a corporal in an Alpine division.
