= Lisa Resch =

German alpine skier (1908–1949)

Medal record

Representing Germany

Women's Alpine skiing

Winter Olympics
Silver medal – second place	1936 Garmisch-Partenkirchen	Downhill

World Championship
Gold medal – first place	1938 Engelberg	Slalom
Silver medal – second place	1934 St. Moritz	Slalom
Silver medal – second place	1934 St. Moritz	Combined
Silver medal – second place	1938 Engelberg	Combined
Silver medal – second place	1939 Zakopane	Downhill
Bronze medal – third place	1934 St. Moritz	Downhill
Bronze medal – third place	1937 Chamonix	Slalom
Bronze medal – third place	1939 Zakopane	Combined

Lisa Resch (4 October 1908 – 31 January 1949) was a German alpine skier. She won the women's world downhill championship in 1938, and a silver medal in the 1936 Winter Olympics women's downhill event.
