= Anny Rüegg =

Swiss alpine skier (1912–2011)

Medal record

Representing Switzerland

Women's Alpine skiing

World Championships
Gold medal – first place	1934 St. Moritz	Downhill
Gold medal – first place	1935 Mürren	Slalom
Silver medal – second place	1935 Mürren	Combined
Bronze medal – third place	1934 St. Moritz	Combined
Bronze medal – third place	1935 Mürren	Downhill

Anny Rüegg-Hardmeier (1912 – 1 May 2011) was a Swiss alpine skier and world champion. She was born in Chur.

Rüegg won a gold medal at the 1934 World Championships in St. Moritz, winning the Downhill event, and a gold medal in slalom at the 1935 World Championships in Mürren.
