= Christl Cranz =

German alpine skier (1914–2004)

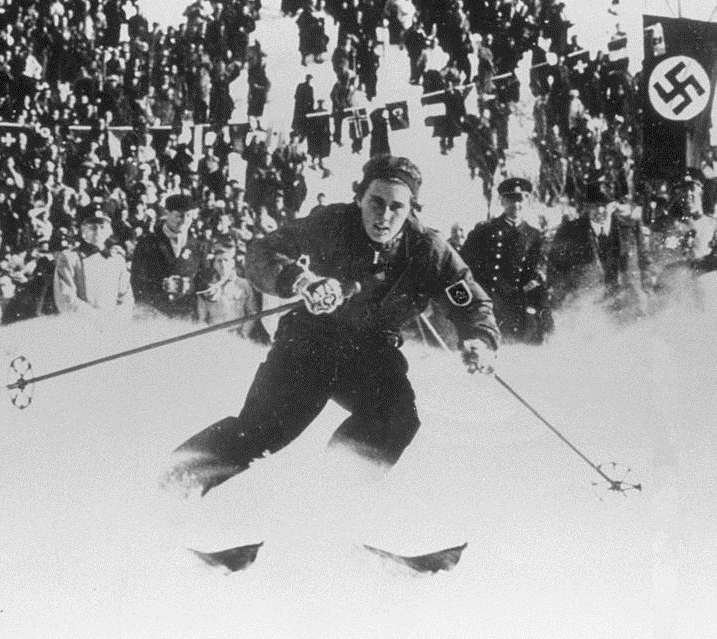
- Cranz at the 1936 Olympics

Personal information
- Born: 1 July 1914 Brussels, Belgium
- Died: 28 September 2004 (aged 90) Oberstaufen-Steibis, Germany

Sport
- Sport: Skiing
Medal record
Representing Germany
Women's Alpine skiing
Winter Olympics
Gold medal – first place	1936 Garmisch-Parten.	Combined
World Championships
Gold medal – first place	1934 St. Moritz	Slalom
Gold medal – first place	1934 St. Moritz	Combined
Gold medal – first place	1935 Mürren	Downhill
Gold medal – first place	1935 Mürren	Combined
Gold medal – first place	1937 Chamonix	Downhill
Gold medal – first place	1937 Chamonix	Slalom
Gold medal – first place	1937 Chamonix	Combined
Gold medal – first place	1938 Engelberg	Slalom
Gold medal – first place	1938 Engelberg	Combined
Gold medal – first place	1939 Zakopane	Downhill
Gold medal – first place	1939 Zakopane	Slalom
Gold medal – first place	1939 Zakopane	Combined
Silver medal – second place	1934 St. Moritz	Downhill
Silver medal – second place	1935 Mürren	Slalom
Silver medal – second place	1938 Engelberg	Downhill

Christl Franziska Antonia Cranz-Borchers (1 July 1914 – 28 September 2004) was a German alpine ski racer. She dominated international competition in the 1930s, winning twelve world championship titles between 1934 and 1939. At the 1936 Winter Olympics in Garmisch-Partenkirchen, Cranz won the combined competition (slalom and downhill).

== Biography ==
Born in Brussels, Cranz was the older sister of Rudolf Cranz. After the break-out of World War I, Cranz and her family fled from Belgium to Traifelberg near Reutlingen, where Cranz learned to ski. Afterwards the family moved to Grindelwald and Freiburg.

Alongside her apprenticeship as trainer and philologist she started a successful ski racing career. In 1934, she won all titles at the German Championship. At the world championship in St. Moritz she won the slalom and the combined competition and was second in downhill (after Swiss Anny Rüegg). She won all titles at the world championships in 1937 (Chamonix) and 1939 (Zakopane). To this day, Cranz remains the most successful competitor at the World Championships, with twelve gold and three silver medals. In the 1930s, the championships were held annually.

At the 1936 Winter Olympics, Cranz won the newly established alpine combined competition in a spectacular race. After a crash in the downhill competition Cranz was 19 seconds behind Laila Schou Nilsen of Norway, but after two outstanding slalom races she won the combined ahead of Käthe Grasegger (Germany) and Schou Nilsen.

At the 1941 World Championships in Cortina d'Ampezzo, Cranz won two additional titles and then retired. Taking place during World War II with only Germany-friendly athletes, the championship was deemed unofficial by the post-war International Ski Federation. After her active career, Cranz publicly donated her skis and equipment, meticulously exploited by the Nazi propaganda, for the "Winterhilfswerk" to support the German troops fighting on the Eastern Front.

In 1943, Cranz married Adolf Borchers. After the end of the war, she was arrested because of her collaboration with the Nazis and was forced to do farmwork for eleven months. Cranz fled into the American Occupation Zone in 1947. Later, she founded a skiing school with her husband, which she led until 1987. Cranz was inducted into the Hall of Fame of International Women's Sports in New York.
