= Hellmut Lantschner =

Austrian and German alpine skier (1909–1993)

Medal record

Representing Germany

Men's Alpine skiing

World championship
Gold medal – first place	1939 Zakopane	Downhill
Bronze medal – third place	1938 Engelberg	Downhill
Bronze medal – third place	1938 Engelberg	Slalom
Bronze medal – third place	1938 Engelberg	Combined

Hellmut Lantschner (11 November 1909 – 4 July 1993) was an Austrian and German alpine skier and world champion. He first competed for Austria, and from 1935 for Germany. He is the brother of Alpine skier and actor Gustav Lantschner.

Lantschner became a world champion in the downhill in 1939.

== Filmography ==
- The Son of the White Mountain (1930)
