= FIS Alpine World Ski Championships 1939 =

Skiing event in Kasprowy Wierch, Poland

- Host city: Zakopane
- Country: Poland
- Events: 6
- Opening: 12 February 1939
- Closing: 15 February 1939
- Opened by: Ignacy Mościcki

Location in Europe
Location in Poland

The FIS Alpine World Ski Championships 1939 in alpine skiing were the ninth edition of the competition, organized by the International Ski Federation (FIS), and were held 12–15 February in Kasprowy Wierch in the Western Tatras, south of Zakopane, Poland. Due to World War II, there would be a nine-year hiatus of the official competition until the 1948 Winter Olympics.

Josef Jennewein, Wilhelm Walch and Helga Gödl were Austrians but after the Anschluss in 1938 they were citizen of 1935-Germany. Their medals cache continue to be counted for Germany. Hellmuth Lantschner also was an Austrian but he had changed to Germany in 1935 and competed under the German Ski Federation after that time.

== Medal summary ==
=== Men's events ===
Event	Gold	Silver	Bronze
Downhill	Hellmut Lantschner (GER)	Josef Jennewein (GER)	Karl Molitor (SUI)
Slalom	Rudolf Rominger (SUI)	Josef Jennewein (GER)	Wilhelm Walch (GER)
Combined	Josef Jennewein (GER)	Wilhelm Walch (GER)	Rudolf Rominger (SUI)

=== Women's events ===
Event	Gold	Silver	Bronze
Downhill	Christl Cranz (GER)	Lisa Resch (GER)	Helga Gödl (GER)
Slalom	Christl Cranz (GER)	Gritli Schaad (SUI)	May Nilsson (SWE)
Combined	Christl Cranz (GER)	Gritli Schaad (SUI)	Lisa Resch (GER)

== Medal table ==
* Host nation (Poland)

Rank	Nation	Gold	Silver	Bronze	Total
1	Germany (GER)	5	4	3	12
2	Switzerland (SUI)	1	2	2	5
3	Sweden (SWE)	0	0	1	1
Totals (3 entries)		6	6	6	18
