= FIS Alpine World Ski Championships 1938 =

Skiing event in Engelberg, Switzerland

- Host city: Engelberg
- Country: Switzerland
- Events: 6
- Opening: 5 March 1938
- Closing: 6 March 1938
- Opened by: Johannes Baumann

The FIS Alpine World Ski Championships 1938 in alpine skiing were the eighth edition of the competition, organized by the International Ski Federation (FIS), and were held in Engelberg, Switzerland in February 1938. Due to the "Anschluss", participants from Austria (male and female) were included in the Deutsche Reich team.

== Medal summary ==
=== Men's events ===
Event	Gold	Silver	Bronze
Downhill	James Couttet (FRA)	Émile Allais (FRA)	Hellmut Lantschner (GER)
Slalom	Rudolf Rominger (SUI)	Émile Allais (FRA)	Hellmut Lantschner (GER)
Combined	Émile Allais (FRA)	Rudolf Rominger (SUI)	Hellmut Lantschner (GER)

=== Women's events ===
Event	Gold	Silver	Bronze
Downhill	Lisa Resch (GER)	Christl Cranz (GER)	Käthe Grasegger (GER)
Slalom	Christl Cranz (GER)	Nini Arx-Zogg (SUI)	Erna Steuri (SUI)
Combined	Christl Cranz (GER)	Lisa Resch (GER)	Käthe Grasegger (GER)

== Medal table ==
* Host nation (Switzerland)

Rank	Nation	Gold	Silver	Bronze	Total
1	Germany (GER)	3	2	5	10
2	France (FRA)	2	2	0	4
3	Switzerland (SUI)*	1	2	1	4
Totals (3 entries)		6	6	6	18
