= James Couttet =

French alpine skier and ski jumper

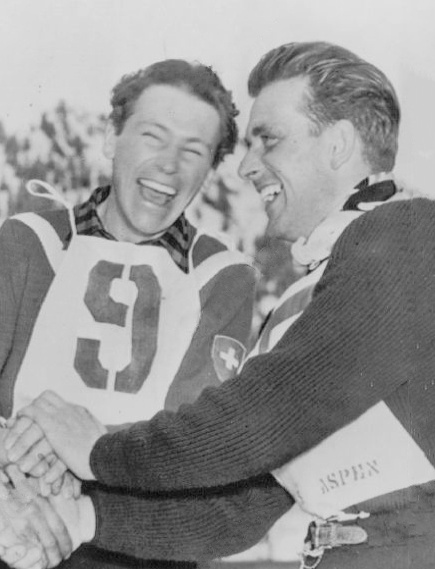
- Couttet (right) at the 1950 World Championships

Personal information
- Born: 6 July 1921 Chamonix, France
- Died: 13 November 1997 (aged 76) Chamonix, France
- Height: 168 cm (5 ft 6 in)
- Weight: 67 kg (148 lb)

Sport
- Sport: Alpine skiing
- Club: Ski Club Chamonix
Medal record
Representing France
Olympic Games
Silver medal – second place	1948 St. Moritz	Slalom
Bronze medal – third place	1948 St. Moritz	Combined
World Championship
Gold medal – first place	1938 Engelberg	Downhill
Silver medal – second place	1950 Colorado	Downhill
Bronze medal – third place	1950 Colorado	Giant slalom

James Couttet (6 July 1921 – 13 November 1997) was a French alpine skier and ski jumper. As an alpine skier he competed at the 1948 and 1952 Olympics and won two medals in 1948: a silver in the slalom and a bronze in the combined event. As a ski jumper he placed 25th in the normal hill at the 1948 Games. Couttet won a full set of medals at the world championships: a gold in 1938 and a silver and bronze in 1950. He retired in 1955 to become a skiing coach and prepare the French alpine skiing team for the 1956 Winter Olympics. He later helped design and build ski lifts. He was married to Lucienne Schmidt-Couttet, a fellow alpine skier who competed at the 1948 Olympics.
