= Émile Allais =

French alpine skier (1912–2012)

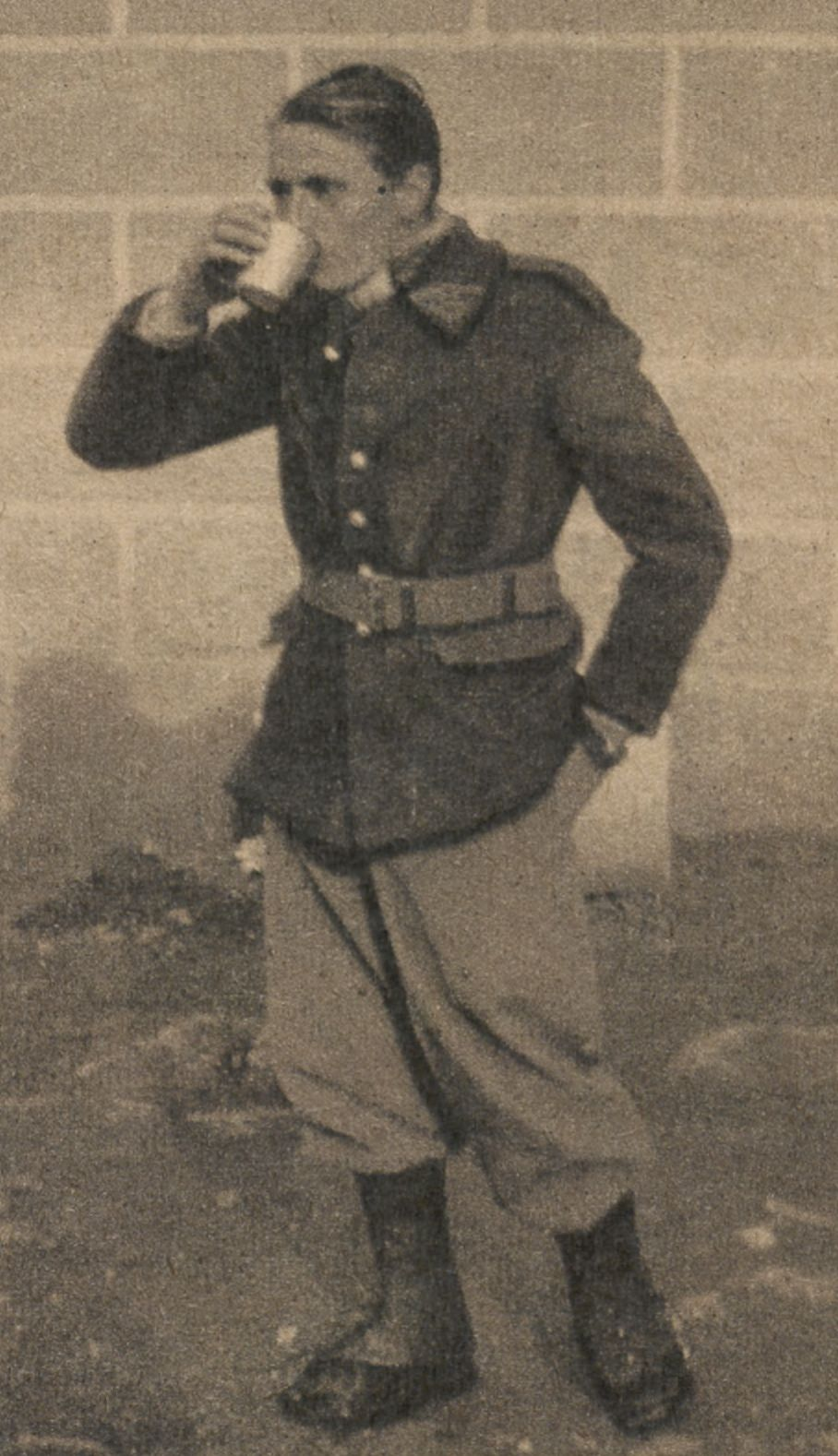

Personal information
- Born: 25 February 1912 Megève, France
- Died: 17 October 2012 (aged 100) Sallanches, France

Sport
- Sport: Skiing
Medal record
Men's alpine skiing
Representing France
Olympic Games
Bronze medal – third place	1936 Garmisch-Partenkirchen	Combined
World Championships
Gold medal – first place	1937 Chamonix	Downhill
Gold medal – first place	1937 Chamonix	Slalom
Gold medal – first place	1937 Chamonix	Combined
Gold medal – first place	1938 Engelberg	Combined
Silver medal – second place	1935 Mürren	Downhill
Silver medal – second place	1935 Mürren	Combined
Silver medal – second place	1938 Engelberg	Downhill
Silver medal – second place	1938 Engelberg	Slalom

Émile Allais (25 February 1912 – 17 October 2012) was a champion alpine ski racer from France; he won all three events at the 1937 world championships in Chamonix and the gold in the combined in 1938. Born in Megève, he was a dominant racer in the late 1930s and is considered to have been the first great French alpine skier.

Allais won the bronze medal in the combined (downhill and slalom), the only alpine medal event at the 1936 Winter Olympics in Garmisch, Germany. These Olympics were the first to award medals in alpine skiing. The previous year, he had won the silver medal in the downhill and combined at the 1935 world championships. In 1937 he was a triple world champion at Chamonix, France, winning all three events (downhill, slalom, and combined). The following year at Engelberg, Switzerland, he won the combined, and took silver in the downhill and slalom. He created the École Française de Ski which taught innovative methods of Anton Seelos (who was his trainer and instructor), characterised by parallel turns, controlling the speed by sideslipping, and turning by ruade (French: kick, back kick), i.e. kicking the backs of the skis up and pivoting on the tips while rotating the body in the direction of the turn. The École du Ski Français (ESF) is now the biggest Ski school in the world in terms of numbers of ski teachers, and is present in every single French ski resort, and even abroad.

After a spell in North and South America (Squaw Valley, California and Portillo, Chile) Allais held the post of technical director at Courchevel from 1954 to 1964, where he introduced many ideas from the U.S. regarding slope preparation and piste security. He later worked as a technical consultant for other resorts, notably La Plagne and Flaine. One of the Saulire couloirs at Courchevel is named after Allais.

As a consultant to Skis Rossignol, Allais helped to design the laminated-wood Olympic 41 ski (1941), and the first aluminum skis to win major ski races, the Métallais (1959) and Allais 60 (1960). The Olympic 41 later served as the basis of Rossignol's very successful Strato (1964).

In December 2005, 93-year-old Allais made the trip to the French Senate in Paris where he was honoured, along with a number of other ski instructors. His life has been all about skiing; he learned his skiing early, raced all over Europe, then coached the French Olympic ski team for seven years. Allais fought in World War II on skis, and even courted his wife at a ski meet. He turned 100 in February 2012.

Allais died after an illness in a hospital in Sallanches in the French Alps on 17 October 2012.
