= Rudolf Rominger =

Swiss alpine skier (1908–1979)

Medal record

Men's alpine skiing

Representing Switzerland

World Championships
Gold medal – first place	1936 Innsbruck	Downhill
Gold medal – first place	1936 Innsbruck	Combined
Gold medal – first place	1938 Engelberg	Slalom
Gold medal – first place	1939 Zakopane	Slalom
Silver medal – second place	1938 Engelberg	Combined
Bronze medal – third place	1936 Innsbruck	Slalom
Bronze medal – third place	1939 Zakopane	Combined

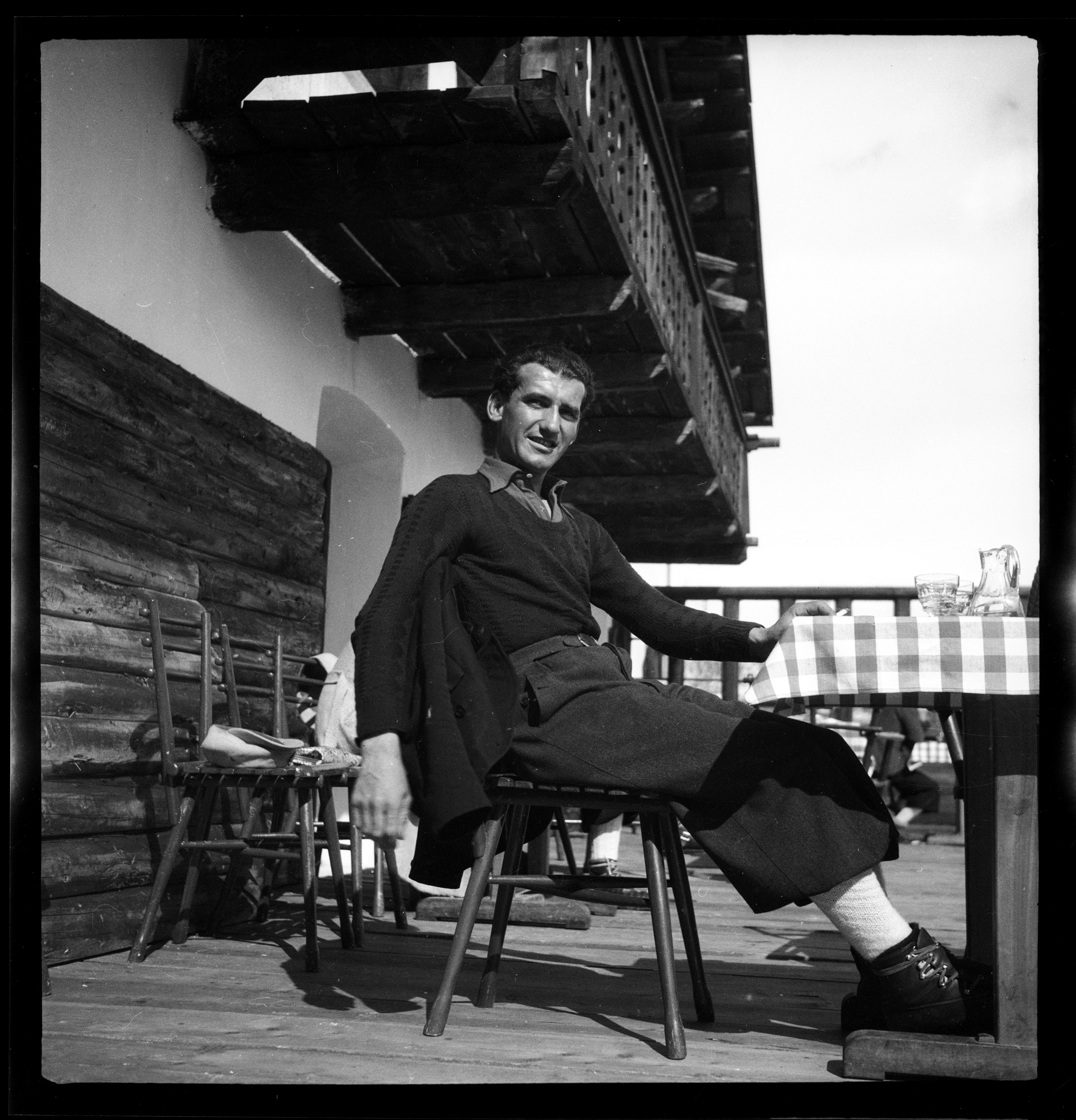
CH-NB - Schweiz, St. Moritz- Menschen - Annemarie Schwarzenbach - SLA-Schwarzenbach-A-5-08-134.jpg

Rudolf Rominger (21 August 1908 – 8 November 1979) was a Swiss alpine skier. He won several World Championship titles.
