= List of FIS Alpine World Ski Championships medalists =

This is a list of medalists from the FIS Alpine World Ski Championships in alpine skiing, competed since 1931.

In 1931 they introduced downhill and slalom; giant slalom in 1950, Super-G in 1987, mixed team in 2005 and team combined in 2025. The combined (classic, super and alpine) between 1932 and 2023 and parallel giant slalom (2021 to 2023) are no longer part of World Championships.

== Men ==
Winter Olympic Games between 1948 and 1980 also counted for World Championships.

=== Downhill ===
Edition	Place	Year	Gold	Silver	Bronze
1	(Switzerland) Mürren	1931	(Switzerland) Walter Prager	(Switzerland) Otto Furrer	(Switzerland) Fritz Steuri
2	(Italy) Cortina d'Ampezzo	1932	(Austria) Gustav Lantschner	(Switzerland) David Zogg	(Switzerland) Otto Furrer
3	(Austria)	1933			
4	(Switzerland) St. Moritz	1934	(Switzerland) David Zogg	(Germany) Franz Pfnür	(Switzerland) Heinz von Allmen (Italy) Ido Cattaneo
5	(Switzerland) Mürren	1935	(Austria) Franz Zingerle	(France) Émile Allais	(Switzerland) Willy Steuri
6	(Austria)	1936			
7		1937			
8	(Switzerland) Engelberg	1938	(France) James Couttet	(France) Émile Allais	(Nazi Germany) Hellmut Lantschner
9	(Poland) Zakopane	1939	(Nazi Germany) Hellmut Lantschner	(Nazi Germany) Josef Jennewein	(Switzerland) Karl Molitor
10	(Switzerland) St. Moritz	1948	(France) Henri Oreiller	(Austria) Franz Gabl	(Switzerland) Karl Molitor (Switzerland) Ralph Olinger
11	(United States) Aspen	1950	(Italy) Zeno Colo	(France) James Couttet	(Austria) Egon Schöpf
12	(Norway) Oslo	1952	(Italy) Zeno Colo	(Austria) Othmar Schneider	(Austria) Christian Pravda
13	(Sweden) Are	1954	(Austria) Christian Pravda	(Austria) Martin Strolz	(Austria) Ernst Oberaigner
14	(Italy) Cortina d'Ampezzo	1956	(Austria) Toni Sailer	(Switzerland) Raymond Fellay	(Austria) Andreas Molterer
15	(Austria) Bad Gastein	1958	(Austria) Toni Sailer	(Switzerland) Roger Staub	(France) Jean Vuarnet
16	(United States) Squaw Valley	1960	(France) Jean Vuarnet	(West Germany) Hanspeter Lanig	(France) Guy Périllat
17		1962			
18	(Austria) Innsbruck	1964			
19	(Chile) Portillo	1966	(France) Jean-Claude Killy	(France) Léo Lacroix	(West Germany) Franz Vogler
20	(France) Grenoble	1968	(France) Jean-Claude Killy	(France) Guy Périllat	(Switzerland) Jean-Daniel Dätwyler
21	(Italy) Val Gardena	1970	(Switzerland) Bernhard Russi	(Austria) Karl Cordin	(Australia) Malcolm Milne
22	(Japan) Saporo	1972	(Switzerland) Bernhard Russi	(Switzerland) Roland Collombin	(Austria) Heinrich Messner
23	(Switzerland) St. Moritz	1974	(Austria) David Zwilling	(Austria) Franz Klammer	(Liechtenstein) Willi Frommelt
24	(Austria)	1976			
25	(West Germany) Garmisch-Partenkirchen	1978	(Austria) Josef Walcher	(West Germany) Michael Veith	(Austria) Werner Grissmann
26	(United States) Lake Placid	1980	(Austria) Leonhard Stock	(Austria) Peter Wirnsberger	(Canada) Steve Podborski
27	(Austria) Schladming	1982	(Austria) Harti Weirather	(Switzerland) Conradin Cathomen	(Austria) Erwin Resch
28	(Italy) Bormio	1985	(Switzerland) Pirmin Zurbriggen	(Switzerland) Peter Müller	(United States) Doug Lewis
29	(Switzerland) Crans-Montana	1987	(Switzerland) Peter Müller	(Switzerland) Pirmin Zurbriggen	(Switzerland) Karl Alpiger
30	(United States) Vail	1989	(West Germany) Hansjörg Tauscher	(Switzerland) Peter Müller	(Switzerland) Karl Alpiger
31	(Austria) Saalbach-Hinterglemm	1991	(Switzerland) Franz Heinzer	(Italy) Peter Runggaldier	(Switzerland) Daniel Mahrer
32	(Japan) Morioka	1993	(Switzerland) Urs Lehmann	(Norway) Atle Skardal	(United States) AJ Kitt
33	(Spain) Sierra Nevada	1996	(Austria) Patrick Ortlieb	(Italy) Kristian Ghedina	(France) Luc Alphand
34	(Italy) Sestriere	1997	(Switzerland) Bruno Kernen	(Norway) Lasse Kjus	(Italy) Kristian Ghedina
35	(United States) Vail / Beaver Creek	1999	(Austria) Hermann Maier	(Norway) Lasse Kjus	(Norway) Kjetil André Aamodt
36	(Austria) St. Anton	2001	(Austria) Hannes Trinkl	(Austria) Hermann Maier	(Germany) Florian Eckert
37	(Switzerland) St. Moritz	2003			
38	(Italy) Bormio	2005	(United States) Bode Miller	(United States) Daron Rahlves	(Austria) Michael Walchhofer
39	(Sweden) Are	2007	(Norway) Aksel Lund Svindal	(Canada) Jan Hudec	(Sweden) Patrik Järbyn
40	(France) Val d’Isere	2009	(Canada) John Kucera	(Switzerland) Didier Cuche	(Switzerland) Carlo Janka
41	(Germany) Garmisch-Partenkirchen	2011	(Canada) Erik Guay	(Switzerland) Didier Cuche	(Italy) Christof Innerhofer
42	(Austria) Schladming	2013	(Norway) Aksel Lund Svindal	(Italy) Dominik Paris	(France) David Poisson
43	(United States) Vail / Beaver Creek	2015	(Switzerland) Patrick Küng	(United States) Travis Ganong	(Switzerland) Beat Feuz
44	(Switzerland) St. Moritz	2017	(Switzerland) Beat Feuz	(Canada) Erik Guay	(Austria) Max Franz
45	(Sweden) Are	2019	(Norway) Kjetil Jansrud	(Norway) Aksel Lund Svindal	(Austria) Vincent Kriechmayr
46	(Italy) Cortina d’Ampezzo	2021	(Austria) Vincent Kriechmayr	(Germany) Andreas Sander	(Switzerland) Beat Feuz
47	(France) Courchevel/Méribel	2023	(Switzerland) Marco Odermatt	(Norway) Aleksander Aamodt Kilde	(Canada) Cameron Alexander
48	(Austria) Saalbach-Hinterglemm	2025	(Switzerland) Franjo von Allmen	(Austria) Vincent Kriechmayr	(Switzerland) Alexis Monney

=== Super-G ===
Edition	Place	Year	Gold	Silver	Bronze
1	(Switzerland) Crans-Montana	1987	(Switzerland) Pirmin Zurbriggen	(Luxembourg) Marc Girardelli	(West Germany) Markus Wasmeier
2	(United States) Vail	1989	(Switzerland) Martin Hangl	(Switzerland) Pirmin Zurbriggen	(Socialist Federal Republic of Yugoslavia) Tomaž Čižman
3	(Austria) Saalbach-Hinterglemm	1991	(Austria) Stephan Eberharter	(Norway) Kjetil André Aamodt	(France) Franck Piccard
	(Japan) Morioka	1993	cancelled due to constant bad weather conditions		
4	(Spain) Sierra Nevada	1996	(Norway) Atle Skardal	(Sweden) Patrik Järbyn	(Norway) Kjetil André Aamodt
5	(Italy) Sestriere	1997	(Switzerland) Bruno Kernen	(Norway) Lasse Kjus	(Italy) Kristian Ghedina
6	(United States) Vail / Beaver Creek	1999	(Austria) Hermann Maier	(Norway) Lasse Kjus	(Norway) Kjetil André Aamodt
7	(Austria) St. Anton	2001	(Austria) Hannes Trinkl	(Austria) Hermann Maier	(Germany) Florian Eckert
8	(Switzerland) St. Moritz	2003			
9	(Italy) Bormio	2005	(United States) Bode Miller	(United States) Daron Rahlves	(Austria) Michael Walchhofer
10	(Sweden) Are	2007	(Italy) Patrick Staudacher	(Austria) Fritz Strobl	(Switzerland) Bruno Kernen
11	(France) Val d’Isere	2009	(Switzerland) Didier Cuche	(Italy) Peter Fill	(Norway) Aksel Lund Svindal
12	(Germany) Garmisch-Partenkirchen	2011	(Italy) Christof Innerhofer	(Austria) Hannes Reichelt	(Croatia) Ivica Kostelić
13	(Austria) Schladming	2013	(United States) Ted Ligety	(France) Gauthier de Tessieres	(Norway) Aksel Lund Svindal
14	(United States) Vail / Beaver Creek	2015	(Austria) Hannes Reichelt	(Canada) Dustin Cook	(France) Adrien Théaux
15	(Switzerland) St. Moritz	2017	(Canada) Erik Guay	(Norway) Kjetil Jansrud	(Canada) Manuel Osborne-Paradis
16	(Sweden) Are	2019	(Italy) Dominik Paris	(France) Johan Clarey (Austria) Vincent Kriechmayr	
17	(Italy) Cortina d’Ampezzo	2021	(Austria) Vincent Kriechmayr	(Germany) Romed Baumann	(France) Alexis Pinturault
18	(France) Courchevel¨/ Méribel	2023	(Canada) James Crawford	(Norway) Aleksander Aamodt Kilde	(France) Alexis Pinturault
19	(Austria) Saalbach-Hinterglemm	2025	(Switzerland) Marco Odermatt	(Austria) Raphael Haaser	(Norway) Adrian Smiseth Sejersted

=== Giant slalom ===
Edition	Place	Year	Gold	Silver	Bronze
1	(United States) Aspen	1950	(Italy) Zeno Colo	(Switzerland) Fernand Grosjean	(France) James Couttet
2	(Norway) Oslo	1952	(Norway) Stein Eriksen	(Austria) Christian Pravda	(Austria) Toni Spiss
3	(Sweden) Are	1954	(Norway) Stein Eriksen	(France) François Bonlieu	(Austria) Andreas Molterer
4	(Italy) Cortina d'Ampezzo	1956	(Austria) Toni Sailer	(Austria) Andreas Molterer	(Austria) Walter Schuster
5	(Austria) Bad Gastein	1958	(Austria) Toni Sailer	(Austria) Josef Rieder	(France) François Bonlieu (Switzerland) Roger Staub
6	(United States) Squaw Valley	1960	(Switzerland) Roger Staub	(Austria) Josef Stiegler	(Austria) Ernst Hinterseer
7		1962			
8	(Austria) Innsbruck	1964			
9	(Chile) Portillo	1966	(France) Guy Périllat	(France) Georges Mauduit	(Austria) Karl Schranz
10	(France) Grenoble	1968	(France) Jean-Claude Killy	(Switzerland) Willy Favre	(Austria) Heinrich Messner
11	(Italy) Val Gardena	1970	(Austria) Karl Schranz	(Austria) Werner Bleiner	(Switzerland) Dumeng Giovanoli
12	(Japan) Saporo	1972	(Italy) Gustav Thöni	(Switzerland) Edmund Bruggmann	(Switzerland) Werner Mattle
13	(Switzerland) St. Moritz	1974	(Italy) Gustav Thöni	(Austria) Hans Hinterseer	(Austria) Piero Gros
14	(Austria) Innsbruck	1976			
15	(West Germany) Garmisch-Partenkirchen	1978	(Sweden) Ingemar Stenmark	(Liechtenstein) Andreas Wenzel	(Liechtenstein) Willi Frommelt
16	(United States) Lake Placid	1980	(Sweden) Ingemar Stenmark	(Liechtenstein) Andreas Wenzel	(Austria) Hans Enn
17	(Austria) Schladming	1982	(United States) Steve Mahre	(Sweden) Ingemar Stenmark	(Socialist Federal Republic of Yugoslavia) Boris Strel
18	(Italy) Bormio	1985	(West Germany) Markus Wasmeier	(Switzerland) Pirmin Zurbriggen	(Luxembourg) Marc Girardelli
19	(Switzerland) Crans-Montana	1987	(Switzerland) Pirmin Zurbriggen	(Luxembourg) Marc Girardelli	(Italy) Alberto Tomba
20	(United States) Vail	1989	(Austria) Rudolf Nierlich	(Austria) Helmut Mayer	(Switzerland) Pirmin Zurbriggen
21	(Austria) Saalbach-Hinterglemm	1991	(Austria) Rudolf Nierlich	(Switzerland) Urs Kälin	(Sweden) Johan Wallner
22	(Japan) Morioka	1993	(Norway) Kjetil André Aamodt	(Austria) Rainer Salzgeber	(Sweden) Johan Wallner
23	(Spain) Sierra Nevada	1996	(Italy) Alberto Tomba	(Switzerland) Urs Kälin	(Switzerland) Michael von Grünigen
24	(Italy) Sestriere	1997	(Switzerland) Michael von Grünigen	(Norway) Lasse Kjus	(Austria) Andreas Schifferer
25	(United States) Vail / Beaver Creek	1999	(Norway) Lasse Kjus	(Liechtenstein) Marco Büchel	(Switzerland) Steve Locher
26	(Austria) St. Anton	2001	(Switzerland) Michael von Grünigen	(Norway) Kjetil André Aamodt	(France) Frédéric Covili
27	(Switzerland) St. Moritz	2003			
28	(Italy) Bormio	2005	(Austria) Hermann Maier	(Austria) Benjamin Raich	(United States) Daron Rahlves
29	(Sweden) Are	2007	(Norway) Aksel Lund Svindal	(Switzerland) Daniel Albrecht	(Switzerland) Didier Cuche
30	(France) Val d’Isere	2009	(Switzerland) Carlo Janka	(Austria) Benjamin Raich	(United States) Ted Ligety
31	(Germany) Garmisch-Partenkirchen	2011	(United States) Ted Ligety	(France) Cyprien Richard	(Austria) Philipp Schörghofer
32	(Austria) Schladming	2013	(United States) Ted Ligety	(Austria) Marcel Hirscher	(Italy) Manfred Mölgg
33	(United States) Vail / Beaver Creek	2015	(United States) Ted Ligety	(Austria) Marcel Hirscher	(France) Alexis Pinturault
34	(Switzerland) St. Moritz	2017	(Austria) Marcel Hirscher	(Austria) Roland Leitinger	(Norway) Leif Kristian Haugen
35	(Sweden) Are	2019	(Norway) Henrik Kristoffersen	(Austria) Marcel Hirscher	(France) Alexis Pinturault
36	(Italy) Cortina d’Ampezzo	2021	(France) Mathieu Faivre	(Italy) Luca De Aliprandini	(Austria) Marco Schwarz
37	(France) Courchevel¨/Méribel	2023	(Switzerland) Marco Odermatt	(Switzerland) Loic Meillard	(Austria) Marco Schwarz
38	(Austria) Saalbach-Hinterglemm	2025	(Austria) Raphael Haaser	(Switzerland) Thomas Tumler	(Switzerland) Loic Meillard

=== Slalom ===
Edition	Place	Year	Gold	Silver	Bronze
1	(Switzerland) Mürren	1931	(Switzerland) David Zogg	(Austria) Toni Seelos	(Germany) Friedl Däuber
2	(Italy) Cortina d'Ampezzo	1932	(Germany) Friedl Däuber	(Switzerland) Otto Furrer	(Austria) Hans Hauser
3	(Austria)	1933			
4	(Switzerland) St. Moritz	1934	(Germany) Franz Pfnür	(Switzerland) David Zogg	(Switzerland) Willy Steuri
5	(Switzerland) Mürren	1935	(Austria) Toni Seelos	(Switzerland) David Zogg	(Austria) Friedl Pfeifer (France) François Vignole
6	(Austria)	1936			
7		1937			
8	(Switzerland) Engelberg	1938	(Switzerland) Rudolf Rominger	(France) Émile Allais	(Nazi Germany) Hellmut Lantschner
9	(Poland) Zakopane	1939	(Switzerland) Rudolf Rominger	(Nazi Germany) Josef Jennewein	(Nazi Germany) Wilhelm Walch
10	(Switzerland) St. Moritz	1948	(Switzerland) Edy Reinalter	(France) James Couttet	(France) Henri Oreiller
11	(United States) Aspen	1950	(Switzerland) Georges Schneider	(Italy) Zeno Colo	(Norway) Stein Eriksen
12	(Norway) Oslo	1952	(Austria) Othmar Schneider	(Norway) Stein Eriksen	(Norway) Guttorm Berge
13	(Sweden) Are	1954	(Norway) Stein Eriksen	(West Germany) Benedikt Obermüller	(Austria) Toni Spiss
14	(Italy) Cortina d'Ampezzo	1956	(Austria) Toni Sailer	(Japan) Chiharu Igaya	(Sweden) Stig Sollander
15	(Austria) Bad Gastein	1958	(Austria) Josef Rieder	(Austria) Toni Sailer	(Japan) Chiharu Igaya
16	(United States) Squaw Valley	1960	(Austria) Ernst Hinterseer	(Austria) Mathias Leitner	(France) Charles Bozon
17		1962			
18	(Austria) Innsbruck	1964			
19	(Chile) Portillo	1966	(Italy) Carlo Senoner	(France) Guy Périllat	(France) Louis Jauffret
20	(France) Grenoble	1968	(France) Jean-Claude Killy	(Austria) Herbert Huber	(Austria) Alfred Matt
21	(Italy) Val Gardena	1970	(France) Jean-Noël Augert	(France) Patrick Russel	(United States) Billy Kidd
22	(Japan) Saporo	1972	(Spain) F. Fernández Ochoa	(Italy) Gustav Thöni	(Italy) Roland Thöni
23	(Switzerland) St. Moritz	1974	(Italy) Gustav Thöni	(Austria) David Zwilling	(Spain) F. Fernández Ochoa
24	(Austria) Innsbruck	1976			
25	(West Germany) Garmisch-Partenkirchen	1978	(Sweden) Ingemar Stenmark	(Italy) Piero Gros	(Liechtenstein) Paul Frommelt
26	(United States) Lake Placid	1980	(Sweden) Ingemar Stenmark	(United States) Phil Mahre	(Switzerland) Jacques Lüthy
27	(Austria) Schladming	1982	(Sweden) Ingemar Stenmark	(Socialist Federal Republic of Yugoslavia) Bojan Križaj	(Sweden) Bengt Fjällberg
28	(Italy) Bormio	1985	(Sweden) Jonas Nilsson	(Luxembourg) Marc Girardelli	(Austria) Robert Zoller
29	(Switzerland) Crans-Montana	1987	(West Germany) Frank Wörndl	(Austria) Günther Mader	(West Germany) Armin Bittner
30	(United States) Vail	1989	(Austria) Rudolf Nierlich	(West Germany) Armin Bittner	(Luxembourg) Marc Girardelli
31	(Austria) Saalbach-Hinterglemm	1991	(Luxembourg) Marc Girardelli	(Austria) Thomas Stangassinger	(Norway) Ole Kristian Furuseth
32	(Japan) Morioka	1993	(Norway) Kjetil André Aamodt	(Luxembourg) Marc Girardelli	(Austria) Thomas Stangassinger
33	(Spain) Sierra Nevada	1996	(Italy) Alberto Tomba	(Austria) Mario Reiter	(Switzerland) Michael von Grünigen
34	(Italy) Sestriere	1997	(Norway) Tom Stiansen	(France) Sébastien Amiez	(Italy) Alberto Tomba
35	(United States) Vail / Beaver Creek	1999	(Finland) Kalle Palander	(Norway) Lasse Kjus	(Austria) Christian Mayer
36	(Austria) St. Anton	2001	(Austria) Mario Matt	(Austria) Benjamin Raich	(Slovenia) Mitja Kunc
37	(Switzerland) St. Moritz	2003			
38	(Italy) Bormio	2005	(Austria) Benjamin Raich	(Austria) Rainer Schönfelder	(Italy) Giorgio Rocca
39	(Sweden) Are	2007	(Austria) Mario Matt	(Italy) Manfred Mölgg	(France) Jean-Baptiste Grange
40	(France) Val d’Isere	2009	(Austria) Manfred Pranger	(France) Julien Lizeroux	(Canada) Michael Janyk
41	(Germany) Garmisch-Partenkirchen	2011	(France) Jean-Baptiste Grange	(Sweden) Jens Byggmark	(Italy) Manfred Mölgg
42	(Austria) Schladming	2013	(Austria) Marcel Hirscher	(Germany) Felix Neureuther	(Austria) Mario Matt
43	(United States) Vail / Beaver Creek	2015	(France) Jean-Baptiste Grange	(Germany) Fritz Dopfer	(Germany) Felix Neureuther
44	(Switzerland) St. Moritz	2017	(Austria) Marcel Hirscher	(Austria) Manuel Feller	(Germany) Felix Neureuther
45	(Sweden) Are	2019	(Austria) Marcel Hirscher	(Austria) Michael Matt	(Austria) Marco Schwarz
46	(Italy) Cortina d’Ampezzo	2021	(Norway) Sebastian Foss Solevag	(Austria) Adrian Pertl	(Norway) Henrik Kristoffersen
47	(France) Courchevel/Méribel	2023	(Norway) Henrik Kristoffersen	(Greece) AJ Ginnis	(Italy) Alex Vinatzer
48	(Austria) Saalbach-Hinterglemm	2025	(Switzerland) Loic Meillard	(Norway) Atle Lie McGrath	(Germany) Linus Straßer

== Women ==
=== Downhill ===
Edition	Place	Year	Gold	Silver	Bronze
1	(Switzerland) Mürren	1931	(United Kingdom) Esmé MacKinnon	(United Kingdom) Nell Carroll	(Austria) Irma Schmidegg
2	(Italy) Cortina d'Ampezzo	1932	(Italy) Paula Wiesinger	(Austria) Inge Wersin-Lantschner	(Austria) Hady Lantschner
3	(Austria)	1933			
4	(Switzerland) St. Moritz	1934	(Switzerland) Anny Rüegg	(Germany) Christl Cranz	(Germany) Lisa Resch
5	(Switzerland) Mürren	1935	(Germany) Christl Cranz	(Germany) Hady Pfeifer-Lantschner	(Switzerland) Anny Rüegg
6	(Austria)	1936			
7		1937			
8	(Switzerland) Engelberg	1938	(Nazi Germany) Lisa Resch	(Nazi Germany) Christl Cranz	(Nazi Germany) Käthe Grasegger
9	(Poland) Zakopane	1939	(Nazi Germany) Christl Cranz	(Nazi Germany) Lisa Resch	(Nazi Germany) Helga Gödl
10	(Switzerland) St. Moritz	1948	(Switzerland) Hedy Schlunegger	(Austria) Trude Jochum-Beiser	(Austria) Resi Hammerer
11	(United States) Aspen	1950	(Austria) Trude Jochum-Beiser	(Austria) Erika Mahringer	(France) Georgette Thiolliere
12	(Norway) Oslo	1952	(Austria) Trude Jochum-Beiser	(West Germany) Annemarie Buchner	(Italy) Giuliana Minuzzo
13	(Sweden) Are	1954	(Switzerland) Ida Schöpfer	(Austria) Trude Klecker	(France) Lucienne Schmith
14	(Italy) Cortina d'Ampezzo	1956	(Switzerland) Madeleine Berthod	(Switzerland) Frieda Dänzer	(Canada) Lucille Wheeler
15	(Austria) Bad Gastein	1958	(Canada) Lucille Wheeler	(Switzerland) Frieda Dänzer	(Italy) Carla Marchelli
16	(United States) Squaw Valley	1960	(West Germany) Heidi Biebl	(United States) Penny Pitou	(Austria) Traudl Hecher
17		1962			
18	(Austria) Innsbruck	1964			
19	(Chile) Portillo	1966	(France) Marielle Goitschel	(France) Annie Famose	(West Germany) Burgl Färbinger
20	(France) Grenoble	1968	(Austria) Olga Pall	(France) Isabelle Mir	(Austria) Christl Haas
21	(Italy) Val Gardena	1970	(Switzerland) Annerösli Zryd	(France) Isabelle Mir	(Austria) Annemarie Moser-Pröll
22	(Japan) Saporo	1972	(Switzerland) Marie-Theres Nadig	(Austria) Annemarie Moser-Pröll	(United States) Susan Corrock
23	(Switzerland) St. Moritz	1974	(Austria) Annemarie Moser-Pröll	(Canada) Betsy Clifford	(Austria) Wiltrud Drexel
24	(Austria) Innsbruck	1976			
25	(West Germany) Garmisch-Partenkirchen	1978			
26	(United States) Lake Placid	1980	(Austria) Annemarie Moser-Pröll	(Liechtenstein) Hanni Wenzel	(Switzerland) Marie-Theres Nadig
27	(Austria) Schladming	1982	(Canada) Gerry Sorensen	(United States) Cindy Nelson	(Canada) Laurie Graham
28	(Italy) Bormio	1985	(Switzerland) Michela Figini	(Switzerland) Ariane Ehrat (Austria) Katharina Gutensohn	
29	(Switzerland) Crans-Montana	1987	(Switzerland) Maria Walliser	(Switzerland) Michela Figini	(West Germany) Regine Mösenlechner
30	(United States) Vail	1989	(Switzerland) Maria Walliser	(Canada) Karen Percy	(West Germany) Karin Dedler
31	(Austria) Saalbach-Hinterglemm	1991	(Austria) Petra Kronberger	(France) Nathalie Bouvier	(Soviet Union) Svetlana Gladysheva
32	(Japan) Morioka	1993	(Canada) Kate Pace	(Norway) Astrid Lodemel	(Austria) Anja Haas
33	(Spain) Sierra Nevada	1996	(United States) Picabo Street	(Germany) Katja Seizinger	(United States) Hilary Lindh
34	(Italy) Sestriere	1997	(United States) Hilary Lindh	(Switzerland) Heidi Zurbriggen	(Sweden) Pernilla Wiberg
35	(United States) Vail / Beaver Creek	1999	(Austria) Renate Götschl	(Austria) Michaela Dorfmeister	(Austria) Stefanie Schuster
36	(Austria) St. Anton	2001	(Austria) Michaela Dorfmeister	(Austria) Renate Götschl	(Austria) Stefanie Schuster
37	(Switzerland) St. Moritz	2003			
38	(Italy) Bormio	2005	(Croatia) Janica Kostelić	(Italy) Elena Fanchini	(Austria) Renate Götschl
39	(Sweden) Are	2007	(Sweden) Anja Pärson	(United States) Lindsey Kildow	(Austria) Nicole Hosp
40	(France) Val d’Isere	2007	(United States) Lindsey Vonn	(Switzerland) Lara Gut	(Italy) Nadia Fanchini
41	(Germany) Garmisch-Partenkirchen	2011	(Austria) Elisabeth Görgl	(United States) Lindsey Vonn	(Germany) Maria Riesch
42	(Austria) Schladming	2013	(France) Marion Rolland	(Italy) Nadia Fanchini	(Germany) Maria Höfl-Riesch
43	(United States) Vail / Beaver Creek	2015	(Slovenia) Tina Maze	(Austria) Anna Fenninger	(Switzerland) Lara Gut
44	(Switzerland) St. Moritz	2017	(Slovenia) Ilka Štuhec	(Austria) Stephanie Venier	(United States) Lindsey Vonn
45	(Sweden) Are	2019	(Slovenia) Ilka Štuhec	(Switzerland) Corinne Suter	(United States) Lindsey Vonn
46	(Italy) Cortina d’Ampezzo	2021	(Switzerland) Corinne Suter	(Germany) Kira Weidle	(Switzerland) Lara Gut-Behrami
47	(France) Courchevel / Méribel	2023	(Switzerland) Jasmine Flury	(Austria) Nina Ortlieb	(Switzerland) Corinne Suter
48	(Austria) Saalbach-Hinterglemm	2025	(United States) Breezy Johnson	(Austria) Mirjam Puchner	(Czech Republic) Ester Ledecká

=== Super-G ===
Edition	Place	Year	Gold	Silver	Bronze
1	(Switzerland) Crans-Montana	1987	(Switzerland) Maria Walliser	(Switzerland) Michela Figini	(Socialist Federal Republic of Yugoslavia) Mateja Svet
2	(United States) Vail	1989	(Austria) Ulrike Maier	(Austria) Sigrid Wolf	(West Germany) Michaela Gerg
3	(Austria) Saalbach-Hinterglemm	1991	(Austria) Ulrike Maier	(France) Carole Merle	(Austria) Anita Wachter
4	(Japan) Morioka	1993	(Germany) Katja Seizinger	(Austria) Sylvia Eder	(Norway) Astrid Lodemel
5	(Spain) Sierra Nevada	1996	(Italy) Isolde Kostner	(Switzerland) Heidi Zurbriggen	(United States) Picabo Street
6	(Italy) Sestriere	1997	(Italy) Isolde Kostner	(Germany) Katja Seizinger	(Germany) Hilde Gerg
7	(United States) Vail / Beaver Creek	1999	(Austria) Alexandra Meissnitzer	(Austria) Renate Götschl	(Austria) Michaela Dorfmeister
8	(Austria) St. Anton	2001	(France) Régine Cavagnoud	(Italy) Isolde Kostner	(Germany) Hilde Gerg
9	(Switzerland) St. Moritz	2003			
10	(Italy) Bormio	2005	(Sweden) Anja Pärson	(Italy) Lucia Recchia	(United States) Julia Mancuso
11	(Sweden) Are	2007	(Sweden) Anja Pärson	(United States) Lindsey Kildow	(Austria) Renate Götschl
12	(France) Val d’Isere	2009	(United States) Lindsey Vonn	(France) Marie Marchand-Arvier	(Austria) Andrea Fischbacher
13	(Germany) Garmisch-Partenkirchen	2011	(Austria) Elisabeth Görgl	(United States) Julia Mancuso	(Germany) Maria Riesch
14	(Austria) Schladming	2013	(Slovenia) Tina Maze	(Switzerland) Lara Gut	(United States) Julia Mancuso
15	(United States) Vail / Beaver Creek	2015	(Austria) Anna Fenninger	(Slovenia) Tina Maze	(United States) Lindsey Vonn
16	(Switzerland) St. Moritz	2017	(Austria) Nicole Schmidhofer	(Liechtenstein) Tina Weirather	(Switzerland) Lara Gut
17	(Sweden) Are	2019	(United States) Mikaela Shiffrin	(Italy) Sofia Goggia	(Switzerland) Corinne Suter
18	(Italy) Cortina d’Ampezzo	2021	(Switzerland) Lara Gut-Behrami	(Switzerland) Corinne Suter	(United States) Mikaela Shiffrin
19	(France) Courchevel / Méribel	2023	(Italy) Marta Bassino	(United States) Mikaela Shiffrin	(Austria) Cornelia Hütter (Norway) Kajsa Vickhoff Lie
20	(Austria) Saalbach-Hinterglemm	2025	(Austria) Stephanie Venier	(Italy) Federica Brignone	(United States) Lauren Macuga (Norway) Kajsa Vickhoff Lie

=== Giant slalom ===
Edition	Place	Year	Gold	Silver	Bronze
1	(United States) Aspen	1950	(Austria) Dagmar Rom	(Austria) Trude Jochum-Beiser	(France) Lucienne Schmith
2	(Norway) Oslo	1952	(United States) Andrea Mead-Lawrence	(Austria) Dagmar Rom	(West Germany) Annemarie Buchner
3	(Sweden) Are	1954	(France) Lucienne Schmith	(Switzerland) Madeleine Berthod	(United States) Jannette Burr
4	(Italy) Cortina d'Ampezzo	1956			
5	(Austria) Bad Gastein	1958	(Canada) Lucille Wheeler	(United States) Sally Deaver	(Switzerland) Frieda Dänzer
6	(United States) Squaw Valley	1960	(Switzerland) Yvonne Rüegg	(United States) Penny Pitou	(Italy) Giuliana Minuzzo
7		1962			
8	(Austria) Innsbruck	1964			
9	(Chile) Portillo	1966	(France) Marielle Goitschel	(Austria) Heidi Zimmermann	(France) Florence Steurer
10	(France) Grenoble	1968	(Canada) Nancy Greene	(France) Annie Famose	(Switzerland) Fernande Bochatay
11	(Italy) Val Gardena	1970	(Canada) Betsy Clifford	(France) Ingrid Lafforgue	(France) Françoise Macchi
12	(Japan) Saporo	1972	(Switzerland) Marie-Theres Nadig	(Austria) Annemarie Moser-Pröll	(Austria) Wiltrud Drexel
13	(Switzerland) St. Moritz	1974	(France) Fabienne Serrat	(West Germany) Traudl Treichl	(France) Jacqueline Rouvier
14	(Austria) Innsbruck	1976			
15	(West Germany) Garmisch-Partenkirchen	1978	(West Germany) Maria Epple	(Switzerland) Lise-Marie Morerod	(Austria) Annemarie Moser-Pröll
16	(United States) Lake Placid	1980	(Liechtenstein) Hanni Wenzel	(West Germany) Irene Epple	(France) Perrine Pelen
17	(Austria) Schladming	1982	(Switzerland) Erika Hess	(United States) Christin Cooper	(Liechtenstein) Ursula Konzett
18	(Italy) Bormio	1985			
19	(Switzerland) Crans-Montana	1987	(Switzerland) Vreni Schneider	(Socialist Federal Republic of Yugoslavia) Mateja Svet	(Switzerland) Maria Walliser
20	(United States) Vail	1989	(Switzerland) Vreni Schneider	(France) Carole Merle	(Socialist Federal Republic of Yugoslavia) Mateja Svet
21	(Austria) Saalbach-Hinterglemm	1991	(Sweden) Pernilla Wiberg	(Austria) Ulrike Maier	(Germany) Traudl Hächer
22	(Japan) Morioka	1993	(France) Carole Merle	(Austria) Anita Wachter	(Germany) Martina Ertl
23	(Spain) Sierra Nevada	1996	(Italy) Deborah Compagnoni	(Switzerland) Karin Roten	(Germany) Martina Ertl
24	(Italy) Sestriere	1997	(Italy) Deborah Compagnoni	(Switzerland) Karin Roten	(France) Leila Piccard
25	(United States) Vail / Beaver Creek	1999	(Austria) Alexandra Meissnitzer	(Norway) Andrine Flemmen	(Austria) Anita Wachter
26	(Austria) St. Anton	2001	(Switzerland) Sonja Nef	(Italy) Karen Putzer	(Sweden) Anja Pärson
27	(Switzerland) St. Moritz	2003			
28	(Italy) Bormio	2005	(Sweden) Anja Pärson	(Finland) Tanja Poutiainen	(United States) Julia Mancuso
29	(Sweden) Are	2007	(Austria) Nicole Hosp	(Sweden) Maria Pietilä Holmner	(Italy) Denise Karbon
30	(France) Val d’Isere	2009	(Germany) Kathrin Hölzl	(Slovenia) Tina Maze	(Finland) Tanja Poutiainen
31	(Germany) Garmisch-Partenkirchen	2011	(Slovenia) Tina Maze	(Italy) Federica Brignone	(France) Tessa Worley
32	(Austria) Schladming	2013	(France) Tessa Worley	(Slovenia) Tina Maze	(Austria) Anna Fenninger
33	(United States) Vail / Beaver Creek	2015	(Austria) Anna Fenninger	(Germany) Viktoria Rebensburg	(Sweden) Jessica Lindell-Vikarby
34	(Switzerland) St. Moritz	2017	(France) Tessa Worley	(United States) Mikaela Shiffrin	(Italy) Sofia Goggia
35	(Sweden) Are	2019	(Slovakia) Petra Vlhová	(Germany) Viktoria Rebensburg	(United States) Mikaela Shiffrin
36	(Italy) Cortina d’Ampezzo	2021	(Switzerland) Lara Gut-Behrami	(United States) Mikaela Shiffrin	(Austria) Katharina Liensberger
37	(France) Courchevel / Méribel	2023	(United States) Mikaela Shiffrin	(Italy) Federica Brignone	(Norway) Ragnhild Mowinckel
38	(Austria) Saalbach-Hinterglemm	2025	(Italy) Federica Brignone	(New Zealand) Alice Robinson	(United States) Paula Moltzan

=== Slalom ===
Edition	Place	Year	Gold	Silver	Bronze
1	(Switzerland) Mürren	1931	(United Kingdom) Esmé MacKinnon	(Austria) Inge Wersin-Lantschner	(United Kingdom) Jeanette Kessler
2	(Italy) Cortina d'Ampezzo	1932			
3	(Austria)	1933			
4	(Switzerland) St. Moritz	1934	(Germany) Christl Cranz	(Germany) Lisa Resch	(Switzerland) Rösli Rominger
5	(Switzerland) Mürren	1935	(Switzerland) Anny Rüegg	(Germany) Christl Cranz	(Germany) Käthe Grasegger
6	(Austria)	1936			
7		1937			
8	(Switzerland) Engelberg	1938	(Nazi Germany) Christl Cranz	(Switzerland) Nini von Arx-Zogg	(Switzerland) Erna Steuri
9	(Poland) Zakopane	1939	(Nazi Germany) Christl Cranz	(Switzerland) Gritli Schaad	(Sweden) May Nilsson
10	(Switzerland) St. Moritz	1948	(United States) Gretchen Fraser	(Switzerland) Antoinette Meyer	(Austria) Erika Mahringer
11	(United States) Aspen	1950	(Austria) Dagmar Rom	(Austria) Erika Mahringer	(Italy) Celina Seghi
12	(Norway) Oslo	1952	(United States) Andrea Mead-Lawrence	(West Germany) Ossi Reichert	(West Germany) Annemarie Buchner
13	(Sweden) Are	1954	(Austria) Trude Klecker	(Switzerland) Ida Schöpfer	(Sweden) Sara Thomasson
14	(Italy) Cortina d'Ampezzo	1956	(Switzerland) Renée Colliard	(Austria) Regina Schöpf	(Soviet Union) Yevgeniya Sidorova
15	(Austria) Bad Gastein	1958	(Norway) Inger Bjornbakken	(Austria) Josefa Frandl	(Switzerland) Annemarie Waser
16	(United States) Squaw Valley	1960	(Canada) Anne Heggtveit	(United States) Betsy Snite	(West Germany) Barbara Henneberger
17		1962			
18	(Austria) Innsbruck	1964			
19	(Chile) Portillo	1966	(France) Annie Famose	(France) Marielle Goitschel	(United States) Penny McCoy
20	(France) Grenoble	1968	(France) Marielle Goitschel	(Canada) Nancy Greene	(France) Annie Famose
21	(Italy) Val Gardena	1970	(France) Ingrid Lafforgue	(United States) Barbara Ann Cochran	(France) Michele Jacot
22	(Japan) Saporo	1972	(United States) Barbara Ann Cochran	(France) Daniele Debernard	(France) Florence Steurer
23	(Switzerland) St. Moritz	1974	(Liechtenstein) Hanni Wenzel	(France) Michèle Jacot	(Switzerland) Lise-Marie Morerod
24	(Austria) Innsbruck	1976			
25	(West Germany) Garmisch-Partenkirchen	1978	(Austria) Lea Sölkner	(West Germany) Pamela Behr	(Austria) Monika Kaserer
26	(United States) Lake Placid	1980	(Liechtenstein) Hanni Wenzel	(West Germany) Christa Kinshofer	(Switzerland) Erika Hess
27	(Austria) Schladming	1982	(Switzerland) Erika Hess	(United States) Christin Cooper	(Italy) Daniela Zini
28	(Italy) Bormio	1985	(France) Perrine Pelen	(France) Christelle Guignard	(Italy) Paoletta Magoni
29	(Switzerland) Crans-Montana	1987	(Switzerland) Erika Hess	(Austria) Roswitha Steiner	(Socialist Federal Republic of Yugoslavia) Mateja Svet
30	(United States) Vail	1989	(Socialist Federal Republic of Yugoslavia) Mateja Svet	(Switzerland) Vreni Schneider	(United States) Tamara McKinney
31	(Austria) Saalbach-Hinterglemm	1991	(Switzerland) Vreni Schneider	(Socialist Federal Republic of Yugoslavia) Nataša Bokal	(Austria) Ingrid Salvenmoser
32	(Japan) Morioka	1993	(Austria) Karin Buder	(United States) Julie Parisien	(Austria) Elfi Eder
33	(Spain) Sierra Nevada	1996	(Sweden) Pernilla Wiberg	(France) Patricia Chauvet	(Slovenia) Urška Hrovat
34	(Italy) Sestriere	1997	(Italy) Deborah Compagnoni	(Switzerland) Lara Magoni	(Austria) Karin Roten
35	(United States) Vail / Beaver Creek	1999	(Australia) Zali Steggall	(Sweden) Pernilla Wiberg	(Norway) Trine Bakke
36	(Austria) St. Anton	2001	(Sweden) Anja Pärson	(France) Christel Pascal	(Norway) Hedda Berntsen
37	(Switzerland) St. Moritz	2003			
38	(Italy) Bormio	2005	(Croatia) Janica Kostelić	(Finland) Tanja Poutiainen	(Czech Republic) Šárka Záhrobská
39	(Sweden) Are	2007	(Czech Republic) Šárka Záhrobská	(Austria) Marlies Schild	(Sweden) Anja Pärson
40	(France) Val d’Isere	2009	(Germany) Maria Höfl-Riesch	(Czech Republic) Šárka Záhrobská	(Finland) Tanja Poutiainen
41	(Germany) Garmisch-Partenkirchen	2011	(Austria) Marlies Schild	(Austria) Kathrin Zettel	(Sweden) Maria Pietilä Holmner
42	(Austria) Schladming	2013	(United States) Mikaela Shiffrin	(Austria) Michaela Kirchgasser	(Sweden) Frida Hansdotter
43	(United States) Vail / Beaver Creek	2015	(United States) Mikaela Shiffrin	(Sweden) Frida Hansdotter	(Czech Republic) Šárka Strachová
44	(Switzerland) St. Moritz	2017	(United States) Mikaela Shiffrin	(Sweden) Frida Hansdotter	(Czech Republic) Šárka Strachová
45	(Sweden) Are	2019	(United States) Mikaela Shiffrin	(Sweden) Anna Swenn-Larsson	(Czech Republic) Petra Vlhová
46	(Italy) Cortina d’Ampezzo	2021	(Austria) Katharina Liensberger	(Czech Republic) Petra Vlhová	(United States) Mikaela Shiffrin
47	(France) Courchevel / Méribel	2023	(Canada) Laurence St-Germain	(United States) Mikaela Shiffrin	(Germany) Lena Dürr
48	(Austria) Saalbach-Hinterglemm	2025	(Switzerland) Camille Rast	(Switzerland) Wendy Holdener	(Austria) Katharina Liensberger

== Team events ==
=== Mixed team ===
Edition	Place	Year	Gold	Silver	Bronze
↓ SUPER GIANT SLALOM + SLALOM ↓
1	(Italy) Bormio	2005	Germany M. Bergmann-Schmuderer; Andreas Ertl; Martina Ertl; Florian Eckert; Hilde Gerg; Felix Neureuther	Austria Nicole Hosp; Renate Götschl; Benjamin Raich; Rainer Schönfelder; Michael Walchhofer; Kathrin Zettel	France Pierrick Bourgeat; Ingrid Jacquemod; Carole Montillet; Christel Pascal; Laure Pequegnot; Jean-Pierre Vidal
2	(Sweden) Are	2007	Austria Renate Götschl; Michaela Kirchgasser; Mario Matt; Benjamin Raich; Marlies Schild; Fritz Strobl	Sweden Jens Byggmark; Patrik Järbyn; Markus Larsson; Hans Olsson; Anna Ottosson; Anja Pärson	Switzerland Daniel Albrecht; Marc Berthod; Sandra Gini; Rabea Grand; Nadia Styger; Fabienne Suter
	(France) Val d’Isere	2009	cancelled due to heavy snowfall and not replaced		
↓ PARALLEL GIANT SLALOM ↓
3	(Germany) Garmisch-Partenkirchen	2011	France Taina Barioz; Thomas Fanara; Anémone Marmottan; Cyprien Richard; Tessa Worley; Gauthier de Tessieres*	Austria Romed Baumann; Anna Fenninger; Michaela Kirchgasser; Benjamin Raich; Marlies Schild; Philipp Schörghofer	Sweden Hans Olsson; Matts Olsson; Anja Pärson; Maria Pietilä Holmner; Axel Bäck*; Sara Hector*
4	(Austria) Schladming	2013	Austria Marcel Hirscher; Nicole Hosp; Michaela Kirchgasser; Philipp Schörghofer; Carmen Thalmann; Marcel Mathis*	Sweden Frida Hansdotter; Mattias Hargin; André Myhrer; Maria Pietilä Holmner; Jens Byggmark*; Nathalie Eklund*	Germany Fritz Dopfer; Lena Dürr; Maria Höfl-Riesch; Felix Neureuther; Veronique Hronek*; Stefan Luitz*
5	(United States) Vail / Beaver Creek	2015	Austria Eva-Maria Brem; Marcel Hirscher; Michaela Kirchgasser; Christoph Nösig; Nicole Hosp*; Philipp Schörghofer*	Canada Phil Brown; Candace Crawford; Erin Mielzynski; Trevor Philp; Marie-Pier Préfontaine*; Erik Read*	Sweden Mattias Hargin; André Myhrer; Maria Pietilä Holmner; Anna Swenn-Larsson; Sara Hector*; Markus Larsson*
6	(Switzerland) St. Moritz	2017	France Adeline Baud-Mugnier; Mathieu Faivre; Alexis Pinturault; Tessa Worley; Julien Lizeroux*; Nastasia Noens*	Slovakia Matej Falat; Veronika Velez-Zuzulová; Petra Vlhová; Andreas Žampa; Tereza Jančová*; Adam Žampa*	Sweden Frida Hansdotter; Mattias Hargin; André Myhrer; Maria Pietilä Holmner; Gustav Lundbäck*; Emelie Wikström*
7	(Sweden) Are	2019	Switzerland Wendy Holdener; Daniel Yule; Aline Danioth; Ramon Zenhäusern; Andrea Ellenberger*; Sandro Simonet*	Austria Katharina Liensberger; Michael Matt; Katharina Truppe; Marco Schwarz; Franziska Gritsch*; Christian Hirschbühl*	Italy Lara Della Mea; Simon Maurberger; Irene Curtoni; Alex Vinatzer; Marta Bassino*; Riccardo Tonetti*
8	(Italy) Cortina d’Ampezzo	2021	Norway Thea Louise Stjernesund; Sebastian Foss Solevag; Kristina Riis-Johannessen; Fabian Wilkens Solheim; Kristin Lysdahl*	Sweden Sara Hector; Kristoffer Jakobsen; Estelle Alphand; Mattias Rönngren; Jonna Luthman*; William Hansson*	Germany Andrea Filser; Stefan Luitz; Emma Aicher; Alexander Schmid; Lena Dürr*; Linus Straßer*
9	(France) Courchevel / Méribel	2023	United States Nina O'Brien; River Radamus; Paula Moltzan; Tommy Ford; Katie Hensien*; Luke Winters*	Norway Thea Louise Stjernesund; Maria Therese Tviberg; Alexander Steen Olsen; Timon Haugan; Kristin Lysdahl; L. K. Nestvold-Haugen*	Canada Valérie Grenier; Jeffrey Read; Britt Richardson; Erik Read
10	(Austria) Saalbach-Hinterglemm	2025	Italy Giorgia Collomb; Filippo Della Vite; Lara Della Mea; Alex Vinatzer	Switzerland Wendy Holdener; Luca Aerni; Delphine Darbellay; Thomas Tumler	Sweden Sara Hector; Kristoffer Jakobsen; Estelle Alphand; Fabian Ax Swartz; Lisa Nyberg*; William Hansson*

=== Team combined ===
Edition	Place	Year	Gold	Silver	Bronze
↓ MEN ↓ (DOWNHILL + SLALOM)
1	(Austria) Saalbach-Hinterglemm	2025	Switzerland I Franjo von Allmen; Loic Meillard	Switzerland II Alexis Monney; Tanguy Nef	Switzerland IV Stefan Rogentin; Marc Rochat
↓ WOMEN ↓ (DOWNHILL + SLALOM)
1	(Austria) Saalbach-Hinterglemm	2025	United States I Breezy Johnson; Mikaela Shiffrin	Switzerland I Lara Gut-Behrami; Wendy Holdener	Austria III Stephanie Venier; Katharina Truppe

== Discontinued ==
=== Combined (M) ===
Men's olympic combined events between 1956 and 1980 counted only as World Championships.

Edition	Place	Year	Gold	Silver	Bronze
↓ CLASSIC COMBINED ↓ (DOWNHILL + 2 SLALOMS)
1	(Italy) Cortina d'Ampezzo	1932	(Switzerland) Otto Furrer	(Austria) Hans Hauser	(Austria) Gustav Lantschner
2	(Austria)	1933			
3	(Switzerland) St. Moritz	1934	(Switzerland) David Zogg	(Germany) Franz Pfnür	(Switzerland) Heinz von Allmen
4	(Switzerland) Mürren	1935	(Austria) Toni Seelos	(France) Émile Allais	(Norway) Birger Ruud
5	(Austria)	1936			
6		1937			
7	(Switzerland) Engelberg	1938	(France) Émile Allais	(Switzerland) Rudolf Rominger	(Nazi Germany) Hellmut Lantschner
8	(Poland) Zakopane	1939	(Nazi Germany) Josef Jennewein	(Nazi Germany) Wilhelm Walch	(Switzerland) Rudolf Rominger
9	(Switzerland) St. Moritz	1948	(France) Henri Oreiller	(Switzerland) Karl Molitor	(France) James Couttet
10	(Sweden) Åre	1954	(Norway) Stein Eriksen	(Austria) Christian Pravda	(Sweden) Stig Sollander
11	(Italy) Cortina d'Ampezzo	1956	(Austria) Toni Sailer	(France) Charles Bozon	(Sweden) Stig Sollander
12	(Austria) Bad Gastein	1958	(Austria) Toni Sailer	(Austria) Josef Rieder	(Switzerland) Roger Staub
13	(United States) Squaw Valley	1960	(France) Guy Périllat	(France) Charles Bozon	(West Germany) Hanspeter Lanig
14		1962			
15	(Austria)	1964			
16	(Chile) Portillo	1966	(France) Jean-Claude Killy	(France) Léo Lacroix	(West Germany) Ludwig Leitner
17	(France) Grenoble	1968	(France) Jean-Claude Killy	(Switzerland) Dumeng Giovanoli	(Austria) Heinrich Messner
18	(Italy) Val Gardena	1970	(United States) Billy Kidd	(France) Patrick Russel	(Poland) Andrzej Bachleda-Curuś
19	(Japan) Saporo	1972	(Italy) Gustav Thöni	(Switzerland) Walter Tresch	(Canada) Jim Hunter
20	(Switzerland) St. Moritz	1974	(Austria) Franz Klammer	(Poland) Andrzej Bachleda-Curuś	(West Germany) Wolfgang Junginger
21	(Austria) Innsbruck	1976			
22	(West Germany) Garmisch-Partenkirchen	1978	(Liechtenstein) Andreas Wenzel	(West Germany) Sepp Ferstl	(United States) Pete Patterson
23	(Japan) Saporo	1980	(United States) Phil Mahre	(Liechtenstein) Andreas Wenzel	(Austria) Leonhard Stock
24	(Austria) Schladming	1982	(France) Michel Vion	(Switzerland) Peter Lüscher	(Austria) Anton Steiner
25	(Italy) Bormio	1985	(Switzerland) Pirmin Zurbriggen	(Austria) Ernst Riedlsperger	(Switzerland) Thomas Bürgler
26	(Switzerland) Crans-Montana	1987	(Luxembourg) Marc Girardelli	(Switzerland) Pirmin Zurbriggen	(Austria) Günther Mader
27	(United States) Vail	1989	(Luxembourg) Marc Girardelli	(Switzerland) Paul Accola	(Austria) Günther Mader
28	(Austria) Saalbach-Hinterglemm	1991	(Austria) Stephan Eberharter	(Italy) Kristian Ghedina	(Austria) Günther Mader
29	(Japan) Morioka	1993	(Norway) Lasse Kjus	(Norway) Kjetil André Aamodt	(Luxembourg) Marc Girardelli
30	(Spain) Sierra Nevada	1996	(Luxembourg) Marc Girardelli	(Norway) Lasse Kjus	(Austria) Günther Mader
31	(Italy) Sestriere	1997	(Norway) Kjetil André Aamodt	(Switzerland) Bruno Kernen	(Austria) Mario Reiter
32	(United States) Vail / Beaver Creek	1999	(Norway) Kjetil André Aamodt	(Norway) Lasse Kjus	(Switzerland) Paul Accola
33	(Austria) St. Anton	2001	(Norway) Kjetil André Aamodt	(Austria) Mario Matt	(Switzerland) Paul Accola
34	(Switzerland) St. Moritz	2003			
35	(Italy) Bormio	2005	(Austria) Benjamin Raich	(Norway) Aksel Lund Svindal	(Italy) Giorgio Rocca
↓ SUPER COMBINED ↓ (DOWNHILL + SLALOM)
36	(Sweden) Åre	2007	(Switzerland) Daniel Albrecht	(Austria) Benjamin Raich	(Switzerland) Marc Berthod
37	(France) Val d’Isère	2009	(Norway) Aksel Lund Svindal	(France) Julien Lizeroux	(Croatia) Natko Zrnčić-Dim
38	(Germany) Garmisch-Partenkirchen	2011	(Norway) Aksel Lund Svindal	(Italy) Christof Innerhofer	(Italy) Peter Fill
39	(Austria) Schladming	2013	(United States) Ted Ligety	(Croatia) Ivica Kostelić	(Austria) Romed Baumann
40	(United States) Vail / Beaver Creek	2015	(Austria) Marcel Hirscher	(Norway) Kjetil Jansrud	(United States) Ted Ligety
↓ ALPINE COMBINED ↓ (DOWNHILL + SLALOM)
41	(Switzerland) St. Moritz	2017	(Switzerland) Luca Aerni	(Austria) Marcel Hirscher	(Switzerland) Mauro Caviezel
42	(Sweden) Åre	2019	(France) Alexis Pinturault	(Slovenia) Štefan Hadalin	(Austria) Marco Schwarz
↓ SUPER GIANT SLALOM + SLALOM ↓
43	(Italy) Cortina d’Ampezzo	2021	(Austria) Marco Schwarz	(France) Alexis Pinturault	(Switzerland) Loïc Meillard
44	(France) Courchevel / Méribel	2023	(France) Alexis Pinturault	(Austria) Marco Schwarz	(Austria) Raphael Haaser

=== Combined (W) ===
Women's olympic combined events between 1956 and 1980 counted only as World Championships.

Edition	Place	Year	Gold	Silver	Bronze
↓ CLASSIC COMBINED ↓ (DOWNHILL + 2 SLALOMS)
1	(Italy) Cortina d'Ampezzo	1932	(Switzerland) Rösli Streiff	(Austria) Inge Wersin-Lantschner	(Austria) Hady Lantschner
2	(Austria)	1933			
3	(Switzerland) St. Moritz	1934	(Germany) Christl Cranz	(Germany) Lisa Resch	(Switzerland) Anny Rüegg
4	(Switzerland) Mürren	1935	(Germany) Christl Cranz	(Switzerland) Anny Rüegg	(Germany) Käthe Grasegger
5	(Austria)	1936			
6		1937			
7	(Switzerland) Engelberg	1938	(Nazi Germany) Christl Cranz	(Nazi Germany) Lisa Resch	(Nazi Germany) Käthe Grasegger
8	(Poland) Zakopane	1939	(Nazi Germany) Christl Cranz	(Switzerland) Gritli Schaad	(Nazi Germany) Lisa Resch
9	(Switzerland) St. Moritz	1948	(Austria) Trude Jochum-Beiser	(United States) Gretchen Fraser	(Austria) Erika Mahringer
10	(Sweden) Åre	1954	(Switzerland) Ida Schöpfer	(Switzerland) Madeleine Berthod	(Austria) Lucienne Schmith
11	(Italy) Cortina d'Ampezzo	1956	(Switzerland) Madeleine Berthod	(Switzerland) Frieda Dänzer	(Italy) Giuliana Minuzzo
12	(Austria) Bad Gastein	1958	(Switzerland) Frieda Dänzer	(Canada) Lucille Wheeler	(Austria) Josefa Frandl
13	(United States) Squaw Valley	1960	(Canada) Anne Heggtveit	(West Germany) Sonja Sperl	(West Germany) Barbara Henneberger
14		1962			
15	(Austria) Innsbruck	1964			
16	(Chile) Portillo	1966	(France) Marielle Goitschel	(France) Annie Famose	(Austria) Heidi Zimmermann
17	(France) Grenoble	1968	(Canada) Nancy Greene	(France) Marielle Goitschel	(France) Annie Famose
18	(Italy) Val Gardena	1970	(France) Michèle Jacot	(France) Florence Steurer	(United States) Marilyn Cochran
19	(Japan) Saporo	1972	(Austria) Annemarie Moser-Pröll	(France) Florence Steurer	(Norway) Toril Førland
20	(Switzerland) St. Moritz	1974	(France) Fabienne Serrat	(Liechtenstein) Hanni Wenzel	(Austria) Monika Kaserer
21	(Austria) Innsbruck	1976			
22	(West Germany) Garmisch-Partenkirchen	1978	(Austria) Annemarie Moser-Pröll	(Liechtenstein) Hanni Wenzel	(France) Fabienne Serrat
23	(United States) Lake Placid	1980	(Liechtenstein) Hanni Wenzel	(United States) Cindy Nelson	(Austria) Ingrid Eberle
24	(Austria) Schladming	1982	(Switzerland) Erika Hess	(France) Perrine Pelen	(United States) Christin Cooper
25	(Italy) Bormio	1985	(Switzerland) Erika Hess	(Austria) Sylvia Eder	(United States) Tamara McKinney
26	(Switzerland) Crans-Montana	1987	(Switzerland) Erika Hess	(Austria) Sylvia Eder	(United States) Tamara McKinney
27	(United States) Vail	1989	(United States) Tamara McKinney	(Switzerland) Vreni Schneider	(Switzerland) Brigitte Oertli
28	(Austria) Saalbach-Hinterglemm	1991	(Switzerland) Chantal Bournissen	(Austria) Ingrid Stöckl	(Switzerland) Vreni Schneider
29	(Japan) Morioka	1993	(Germany) Miriam Vogt	(United States) Picabo Street	(Austria) Anita Wachter
30	(Spain) Sierra Nevada	1996	(Sweden) Pernilla Wiberg	(Austria) Anita Wachter	(Norway) Marianne Kjørstad
31	(Italy) Sestriere	1997	(Austria) Renate Götschl	(Germany) Katja Seizinger	(Germany) Hilde Gerg
32	(United States) Vail / Beaver Creek	1999	(Sweden) Pernilla Wiberg	(Austria) Renate Götschl	(France) Florence Masnada
33	(Austria) St. Anton	2001	(Sweden) Pernilla Wiberg	(Austria) Renate Götschl	(France) Florence Masnada
34	(Switzerland) St. Moritz	2003			
35	(Italy) Bormio	2005	(Croatia) Janica Kostelić	(Sweden) Anja Pärson	(Austria) Marlies Schild
↓ SUPER COMBINED ↓ (DOWNHILL + SLALOM)
36	(Sweden) Åre	2007	(Sweden) Anja Pärson	(United States) Julia Mancuso	(Austria) Marlies Schild
37	(France) Val d’Isère	2009	(Austria) Kathrin Zettel	(Switzerland) Lara Gut	(Austria) Elisabeth Görgl
38	(Germany) Garmisch-Partenkirchen	2011	(Austria) Anna Fenninger	(Slovenia) Tina Maze	(Sweden) Anja Pärson
39	(Austria) Schladming	2013	(Germany) Maria Höfl-Riesch	(Slovenia) Tina Maze	(Austria) Nicole Hosp
40	(United States) Vail / Beaver Creek	2015	(Slovenia) Tina Maze	(Austria) Nicole Hosp	(Austria) Michaela Kirchgasser
↓ ALPINE COMBINED ↓ (DOWNHILL + SLALOM)
41	(Switzerland) St. Moritz	2017	(Switzerland) Wendy Holdener	(Switzerland) Michelle Gisin	(Austria) Michaela Kirchgasser
42	(Sweden) Åre	2019	(Switzerland) Wendy Holdener	(Slovakia) Petra Vlhová	(Norway) Ragnhild Mowinckel
↓ SUPER GIANT SLALOM + SLALOM ↓
43	(Italy) Cortina d’Ampezzo	2021	(United States) Mikaela Shiffrin	(Slovakia) Petra Vlhová	(Switzerland) Michelle Gisin
44	(France) Courchevel / Méribel	2023	(Italy) Federica Brignone	(Switzerland) Wendy Holdener	(Austria) Ricarda Haaser

=== Parallel giant slalom ===
Edition	Place	Year	Gold	Silver	Bronze
↓ MEN ↓
1	(Italy) Cortina d’Ampezzo	2021	(France) Mathieu Faivre	(Croatia) Filip Zubčić	(Switzerland) Loïc Meillard
2	(France) Courchevel / Méribel	2023	(Germany) Alexander Schmid	(Austria) Dominik Raschner	(Norway) Timon Haugan
↓ WOMEN ↓
1	(Italy) Cortina d’Ampezzo	2021	(Italy) Marta Bassino (Austria) Katharina Liensberger		(France) Tessa Worley
2	(France) Courchevel / Méribel	2023	(Norway) Maria Therese Tviberg	(Switzerland) Wendy Holdener	(Norway) Thea Louise Stjernesund

== See also ==
- List of alpine skiing world champions
