= FIS Alpine World Ski Championships 1931 – Men's slalom =

Men's slalom at the FIS Alpine World Ski Championships 1931
- Location: Wintereggstrecke; Mürren, Switzerland
- Dates: 21 February
- Competitors: 30 from 6 nations
- Winning time: 54.6

Medalists
gold medal	David Zogg	Switzerland
silver medal	Anton Seelos	Austria
bronze medal	Friedl Däuber	Germany

The Men's slalom competition at the FIS Alpine World Ski Championships 1931 was held on 21 February.

== Results ==
Place	Skier	Country	Time	Penalty
1	David Zogg	Switzerland	0:54,6	-
2	Toni Seelos	Austria	0:55,5	-
3	Friedl Däuber	Germany	0:55,8	-
4	William James Riddel	United Kingdom	0:57,9	-
5	Walter Prager	Switzerland	1:01,1	-
6	Martin Neuner	Germany	1:01,6	-
7	Peter Lunn	United Kingdom	1:02,5	-
8	Hansgeorg von Weech	Germany	1:02,5	-
9	William Bracken	United Kingdom	1:02,7	6,0
10	Ulrich Neuner	Germany	1:04,8	6,0
11	E.W.A. Richardson	United Kingdom	1:06,5	-
12	Hannes Schroll	Austria	1:10,0	6,0
13	Harold Mitchell	United Kingdom	1:10,1	-
14	Karl Reiser	Germany	1:10,4	6,0
15	Antony Bulwer-Lytton	United Kingdom	1:10,5	6,0
16	Karl Rösen	Germany	1:13,3	-
17	Thomas Mitchell	Australia	1:13,3	6,0
18	Pelham Maitland	United Kingdom	1:17,0	12,0
19	Peter Alexander von Le Fort	Germany	1:23,3	6,0
20	Carlo Barassi	Italy	1:39,4	-
DNS	Harald Reinl	Austria	-	-
DNS	Gustav Lantschner	Austria	-	-
DNS	Otto Lantschner	Austria	-	-
DNS	Richard Waghorn	United Kingdom	-	-
DNS	Chris Mackintosh	United Kingdom	-	-
DNS	Willy Steuri	Switzerland	-	-
DNS	Otto Furrer	Switzerland	-	-
DNS	Fritz Steuri II	Switzerland	-	-
DNS	Ernst von Allmen	Switzerland	-	-
DNS	Hans Schlunegger	Switzerland	-	
