= 1931 in sports =

1931 in sports describes the year's events in world sport.

== Alpine skiing ==
FIS Alpine World Ski Championships

Inaugural FIS Alpine World Ski Championships are held at Mürren, Switzerland. The events are a downhill and a slalom race in both the men's and women's categories. The winners are:

- Men's downhill – Walter Prager (Switzerland)
- Men's slalom – David Zogg (Switzerland)
- Women's downhill – Esme Mackinnon (Great Britain)
- Women's slalom – Esme Mackinnon (Great Britain)

== American football ==
- NFL championship – Green Bay Packers (12–2)
- Rose Bowl (1930 season):
  - The Alabama Crimson Tide won 24–0 over the Washington State Cougars to share the college football national championship

== Association football ==
England

- The Football League – Arsenal 66 points, Aston Villa 59, Sheffield Wednesday 52, Portsmouth 49, Huddersfield Town 48, Derby County 46
- FA Cup final – West Bromwich Albion 2–1 Birmingham City at Empire Stadium, Wembley, London

Germany

- National Championship – Hertha BSC 3–2 TSV 1860 München at Köln

Spain

- La Liga won by Athletic Bilbao

Italy

- Serie A won by Juventus

Brazil

- Foundation of Botafogo Rio

== Athletics ==
- 29 – 31 Maj - Olympics of Grace, Florence Italy

== Australian rules football ==
- May 9: Richmond beat South Melbourne’s 12 year record for the highest score when they kick 30.19 (199) to North Melbourne’s 4.7 (31). Doug Strang, in his second game, and Jack Titus kick 22 goals between them – still an equal record for two players on one side.

VFL Premiership

- Geelong wins the 35th VFL Premiership: defeating Richmond 9.14 (68) to 7.6 (48) at Melbourne Cricket Ground (MCG)
- The annual Brownlow Medal is awarded to Haydn Bunton senior (Fitzroy)

South Australian National Football League

- 3 October: North Adelaide 17.13 (115) defeat Sturt 11.11 (77) to win their sixth SANFL premiership.
- Magarey Medal won by Jack Sexton (West Adelaide)

Western Australian National Football League

- 1 June: East Fremantle’s 4.28 (52) against South Fremantle’s 5.8 (38) is the second most inaccurate score in WA(N)FL history by excess of behinds over goals and the most until 1957.
- 17 October: East Fremantle win their fourth consecutive WA(N)FL premiership, beating Subiaco 9.13 (67) to 7.7 (49) in the 1931 WANFL Grand Final.
- Sandover Medal won by Lin Richards (East Fremantle)

== Bandy ==
Sweden

- Championship final – AIK 4–3 IF Karlstad-Göta

== Baseball ==
World Series

- 1–10 October — St. Louis Cardinals (NL) defeats Philadelphia Athletics (AL) to win the 1931 World Series by four games to three

Major League Baseball

- MVP awards to Frankie Frisch (NL) and Lefty Grove (AL)

Negro leagues

- The Negro National League disbands. St. Louis Stars win the last championship.

== Basketball ==
ABL Championship

- Brooklyn Visitations over Fort Wayne Hoosiers (4–2)

College Championship

- Northwestern University wins the men's college basketball title

Events

- The ABL suspends operations after the 1930–1931 season. This is also the last year it operates as a major professional league.

== Bobsleigh ==
Bobsleigh World Championships

- 2nd FIBT World Championships 1931 are held in Oberhof, Germany (two-man bob) and St Moritz, Switzerland (four-man bob). Both gold medals are won by Germany.

== Boxing ==
Events

- World Middleweight Champion Mickey Walker vacates his title to campaign as a heavyweight. The middleweight championship remains vacant until 1941.

Lineal world champions

- World Heavyweight Championship – Max Schmeling
- World Light Heavyweight Championship – Maxie Rosenbloom
- World Middleweight Championship – Mickey Walker → vacant
- World Welterweight Championship – Tommy Freeman → "Young" Jack Thompson → Lou Brouillard
- World Lightweight Championship – Tony Canzoneri
- World Featherweight Championship – Bat Battalino
- World Bantamweight Championship – Panama Al Brown
- World Flyweight Championship – vacant

== Canadian football ==
Grey Cup

- 19th Grey Cup in the Canadian Football League – Montreal AAA defeats Regina Roughriders 22–0

== Cricket ==
Events

- New Zealand plays its first Test series in England. England wins the series 1–0 with two matches drawn.

England

- County Championship – Yorkshire
- Minor Counties Championship – Leicestershire II
- Most runs – Herbert Sutcliffe 3006 @ 96.96 (HS 230)
- Most wickets – Tich Freeman 276 @ 15.60 (BB 10–79)
- Wisden Cricketers of the Year – Bill Bowes, Stewie Dempster, James Langridge, Iftikhar Ali Khan Pataudi, Hedley Verity

Australia

- Sheffield Shield – Victoria
- Most runs – Don Bradman 1422 @ 79.00 (HS 258)
- Most wickets – Clarrie Grimmett 74 @ 19.14 (BB 7–87)

India

- Bombay Quadrangular – not contested

New Zealand

- Plunket Shield – Canterbury

South Africa

- Currie Cup – not contested

West Indies

- Inter-Colonial Tournament – not contested

== Cycling ==
Tour de France

- Antonin Magne (France) wins the 25th Tour de France

Other events

- Giro d'Italia is won by Francesco Camusso (Italy)
- World Cycling Championship is won by Learco Guerra (Italy)

== Figure skating ==
World Figure Skating Championships

- World Men's Champion – Karl Schäfer (Austria)
- World Women's Champion – Sonja Henie (Norway)
- World Pairs Champions – Emília Rotter and László Szollás (Hungary)

== Golf ==
Major tournaments

- British Open – Tommy Armour
- U.S. Open – Billy Burke
- PGA Championship – Tom Creavy

Other tournaments

- British Amateur – Eric Martin-Smith
- U.S. Amateur – Francis Ouimet
- Women's Western Open – June Beebe

== Harness racing ==
USA

- Hambletonian – Calumet Butler
- Kentucky Futurity – The Protector

== Horse racing ==
England

- Champion Hurdle – not contested due to frost
- Cheltenham Gold Cup – not contested due to frost
- Grand National – Grakle
- 1,000 Guineas Stakes – Four Course
- 2,000 Guineas Stakes – Cameronian
- The Derby – Cameronian
- The Oaks – Brulette
- St. Leger Stakes – Sandwich

Australia

- Melbourne Cup – White Nose

Canada

- King's Plate – Froth Blower

France

- Prix de l'Arc de Triomphe – Pearl Cap

Ireland

- Irish Grand National – Impudent Barney
- Irish Derby Stakes – Sea Serpent

USA

- Kentucky Derby – Twenty Grand
- Preakness Stakes – Mate
- Belmont Stakes – Twenty Grand

== Ice hockey ==
Stanley Cup

- Montreal Canadiens defeats Chicago Black Hawks by 3 games to 2

Ice Hockey World Championships

- Gold Medal – Canada
- Silver Medal – United States
- Bronze Medal – Austria

Other events

- Hockey Night in Canada, now the oldest sports-related television program still on air, debuts as a radio program known as the General Motors Hockey Broadcast. The TV series begins in 1952.

== Nordic skiing ==
FIS Nordic World Ski Championships

- 6th FIS Nordic World Ski Championships 1931 are held at Oberhof, Germany

== Rowing ==
The Boat Race

- 21 March — Cambridge wins the 83rd Oxford and Cambridge Boat Race

== Rugby league ==
England

- Championship – Swinton
- Challenge Cup final – Halifax 22–8 York at Empire Stadium, Wembley, London
- Lancashire League Championship – Swinton
- Yorkshire League Championship – Leeds
- Lancashire County Cup – St Helens Recs 18–3 Wigan
- Yorkshire County Cup – Leeds 10–2 Huddersfield

Australia

- NSW Premiership – South Sydney 12–7 Eastern Suburbs

== Rugby union ==
Five Nations Championship

- 44th Five Nations Championship series is won by Wales
- Shortly after the 1931 Five Nations Championship is completed, France is banned from the competition due to allegations of professionalism and administrative deficiencies. France will be readmitted after the 1939 competition but will not be able to play until 1947 because of the suspension of international rugby during World War II. In the meantime, the competition reverts to its original title of Home Nations Championship.

== Snooker ==
World Championship

- 5th World Snooker Championship is won by Joe Davis who defeats Tom Dennis 25–21

== Speed skating ==
Speed Skating World Championships

- Men's All-round Champion – Clas Thunberg (Finland)

== Tennis ==
Australia

- Australian Men's Singles Championship – Jack Crawford (Australia) defeats Harry Hopman (Australia) 6–4 6–2 2–6 6–1
- Australian Women's Singles Championship – Coral Buttsworth (Australia) defeats Marjorie Cox Crawford (Australia) 1–6 6–3 6–4

England

- Wimbledon Men's Singles Championship – Sidney Wood (USA) by a walkover after Frank Shields (USA) withdraws from the final due to an ankle injury
- Wimbledon Women's Singles Championship – Cilly Aussem (Germany) defeats Hilde Krahwinkel Sperling (Germany) 6–2 7–5

France

- French Men's Singles Championship – Jean Borotra (France) defeats Christian Boussus (USA) 2–6 6–4 7–5 6–4
- French Women's Singles Championship – Cilly Aussem (Germany) defeats Betty Nuthall (Great Britain) 8–6 6–1

USA

- American Men's Singles Championship – Ellsworth Vines (USA) defeats George Lott (USA) 7–9 6–3 9–7 7–5
- American Women's Singles Championship – Helen Wills Moody (USA) defeats Eileen Bennett Whittingstall (Great Britain) 6–4 6–1

Davis Cup

- 1931 International Lawn Tennis Challenge – France 3–2 Great Britain at Stade Roland Garros (clay) Paris, France

== Awards ==
Associated Press Athlete of the Year

- Inauguration of the Athlete of the Year award in the United States by the Associated Press (AP). The AP offers a male and a female athlete of the year award to either a professional or amateur athlete, the awards being voted on annually by a panel of AP sports editors from across the United States. The first winners are:
- Associated Press Male Athlete of the Year – Pepper Martin (baseball)
- Associated Press Female Athlete of the Year – Helene Madison (swimming)
