= FIS Alpine World Ski Championships 1931 – Men's downhill =

1931 edition of The FIS Alpine World Ski Championships

Men's downhill at the FIS Alpine World Ski Championships 1931
- Location: Mürren, Switzerland
- Dates: 20 February
- Competitors: 25 from 6 nations
- Winning time: 1:56,2

Medalists
gold medal	Walter Prager	Switzerland
silver medal	Otto Furrer	Switzerland
bronze medal	Fritz Steuri II	Switzerland

The Men's downhill competition at the FIS Alpine World Ski Championships 1931 was held on 20 February.

== Results ==
Place	Skier	Country	Time
1st place, gold medalist(s)	Walter Prager	Switzerland	1:56,2
2nd place, silver medalist(s)	Otto Furrer	Switzerland	2:18,0
3rd place, bronze medalist(s)	Fritz Steuri II	Switzerland	2:21,8
4	Ernst Feuz	Switzerland	2:22,2
5	Gustav Lantschner	Austria	2:31,0
6	Otto Lantschner	Austria	2:34,4
7	Antony Bulwer-Lytton	United Kingdom	2:42,8
8	Harald Reinl	Austria	2:48,8
9	Hans von Weech	Germany	2:53,8
10	David Zogg	Switzerland	2:55,0
11	Martin Neuner	Germany	2:57,0
12	Friedl Däuber	Germany	3:00,0
13	Peter Lunn	United Kingdom	3:00,2
14	Hannes Schroll	Austria	3:03,6
15	Toni Seelos	Austria	3:04,4
16	James Riddell	United Kingdom	3:06,2
17	Chris Mackintosh	United Kingdom	3:11,4
18	Richard Waghorn	United Kingdom	3:16,0
19	Ulrich Neuner	Germany	3:16,4
20	Karl Reiser	Germany	3:17,2
21	Peter Alexander von le Fort	Germany	3:25,4
22	Hans Nöbl	Austria	3:36,4
23	Bill Bracken	United Kingdom	3:56,6
24	Thomas Mitchell	Australia	4:39,2
25	Carlo Barassi	Italy	4:50,4
DNF	Hans Schlunegger	Switzerland	-
