= Austria at the FIS Alpine World Ski Championships 1933 =

Austria at the 1933 FIS Alpine World Ski Championships
- IOC code: AUT
- National federation: Austrian Ski Federation (ÖSV)
- Website: www.oesv.at

in (Austria) Innsbruck
- Medals Ranked 1st: Gold 5 Silver 2 Bronze 2 Total 9

FIS Alpine World Ski Championships appearances
- 1933; 1934; 1935; 1936; 1937; 1938; 1939; 1948; 1950; 1952; 1954; 1956; 1958; 1960; 1962; 1964; 1966; 1968; 1970; 1972; 1974; 1976; 1978; 1980; 1982; 1985; 1987; 1989; 1991; 1993; 1996; 1997; 1999; 2001; 2003; 2005; 2007; 2009; 2011; 2013; 2015; 2017; 2019; 2021

Austria competed at the FIS Alpine World Ski Championships 1933 in Innsbruck, Austria, from 6 to 10 February 1933.

== Medalists ==
Athlete	Gendre	Event	Medal
Toni Seelos	Men	Slalom	GOLD
Toni Seelos	Men	Combined	GOLD
Inge Wersin-Lantschner	Women	Slalom	GOLD
Inge Wersin-Lantschner	Women	Downhill	GOLD
Inge Wersin-Lantschner	Women	Combined	GOLD
Gustav Lantschner	Men	Slalom	SILVER
Gerda Paumgarten	Women	Combined	SILVER
Hans Hauser	Men	Downhill	BRONZE
Gerda Paumgarten	Women	Downhill	BRONZE
