= Steuri =

Steuri is a surname. Notable people with the surname include:

- Erna Steuri (1917–2001), Swiss alpine skier
- Fritz Steuri (1879–1950), Swiss mountain climber
- Fritz Steuri II (1903-1955), Swiss alpine skier
- Fritz Steuri Jr. (1908–1953), Swiss ski jumper

== See also ==
- Fritz Steuri (disambiguation)
- Steuri Glacier, a glacier in Marie Byrd Land, Antarctica
