= Dunagiri (mountain) =

Mountain in Uttarakhand, India

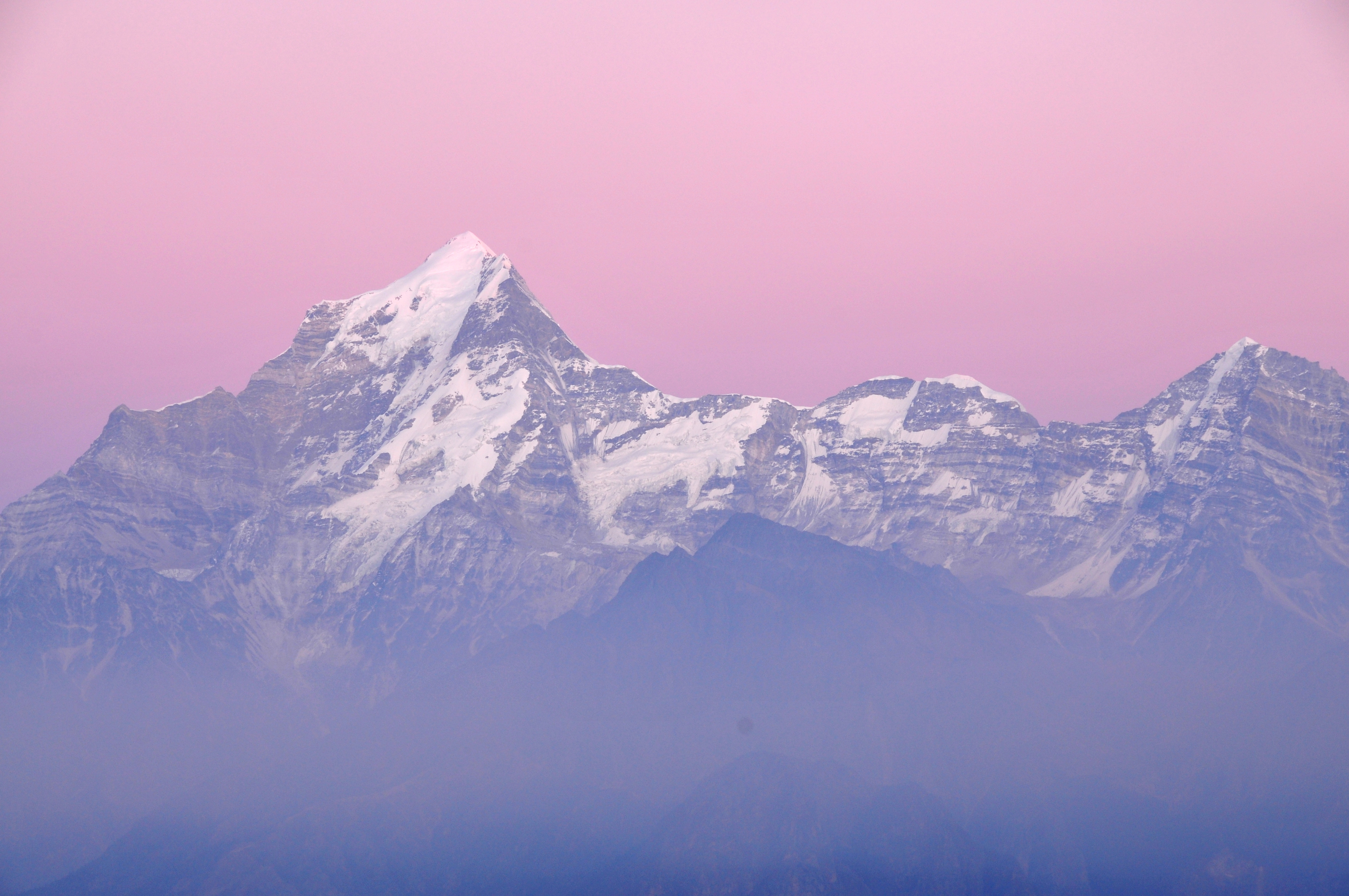
- Dunagiri from the Kuari Pass

Highest point
- Elevation: 7,066 m (23,182 ft)
- Prominence: c. 1,200 m (3,900 ft)
- Coordinates: 30°31′57″N 79°50′02″E

Geography
- Location within Uttarakhand
- Location: Uttarakhand, India
- Parent range: Nanda Devi Group, Garhwal Himalayas

Climbing
- First ascent: 5 July 1939 by André Roch, F. Steuri, D. Zogg
- Easiest route: southwest ridge: rock/snow/ice climb

Dunagiri (7,066 m) is one of the high peaks of the Chamoli District Himalayas in the northern Indian state of Uttarakhand. It lies at the northwest corner of the Sanctuary Wall, a ring of peaks surrounding Nanda Devi and enclosing the Nanda Devi Sanctuary.

== In Hindu legends ==
According to Ramayana, Sanjeevani is a magical herb that has the power to cure serious nervous system problems. It was believed that medicines prepared from this herb could revive someone when death was almost certain. The herb is mentioned in the Ramayana when Ravana's son Indrajit (Meghnath) hurls a powerful weapon at Lakshmana. Lakshmana is badly wounded and is nearly killed. Hanuman was called upon to fetch this herb from Mount Dronagiri (Mahodaya) or the Gandhamardhan hills, far to the north of the Vindhyas on the slopes of the Himalayas. The mountain of herbs is identified as the Valley of Flowers near Badri in Uttarakhand on the slopes of the Himalayas. It is sometimes called Gandhamardan, and at other times Dronagiri. Upon reaching Dronagiri Parvata or Gandhamardan, Hanuman could not identify the herb and lifted the whole mountain and brought it to the battlefield.

== History ==
Dunagiri was first climbed on 5 July 1939 by the Swiss climbers André Roch, Fritz Steuri and David Zogg, via the southwest ridge. In 1975, Joe Tasker and Dick Renshaw climbed a particularly difficult route on the southeast buttress in a significant milestone for alpine-style climbing. In 1978 the first Australian Himalayan expedition by the Australian National University Mountaineering Club made the fourth ascent via the south-west ridge. Lincoln Hall and Tim Macartney-Snape made the final summit attempt with Macartney-Snape successfully summiting.

== Gallery ==
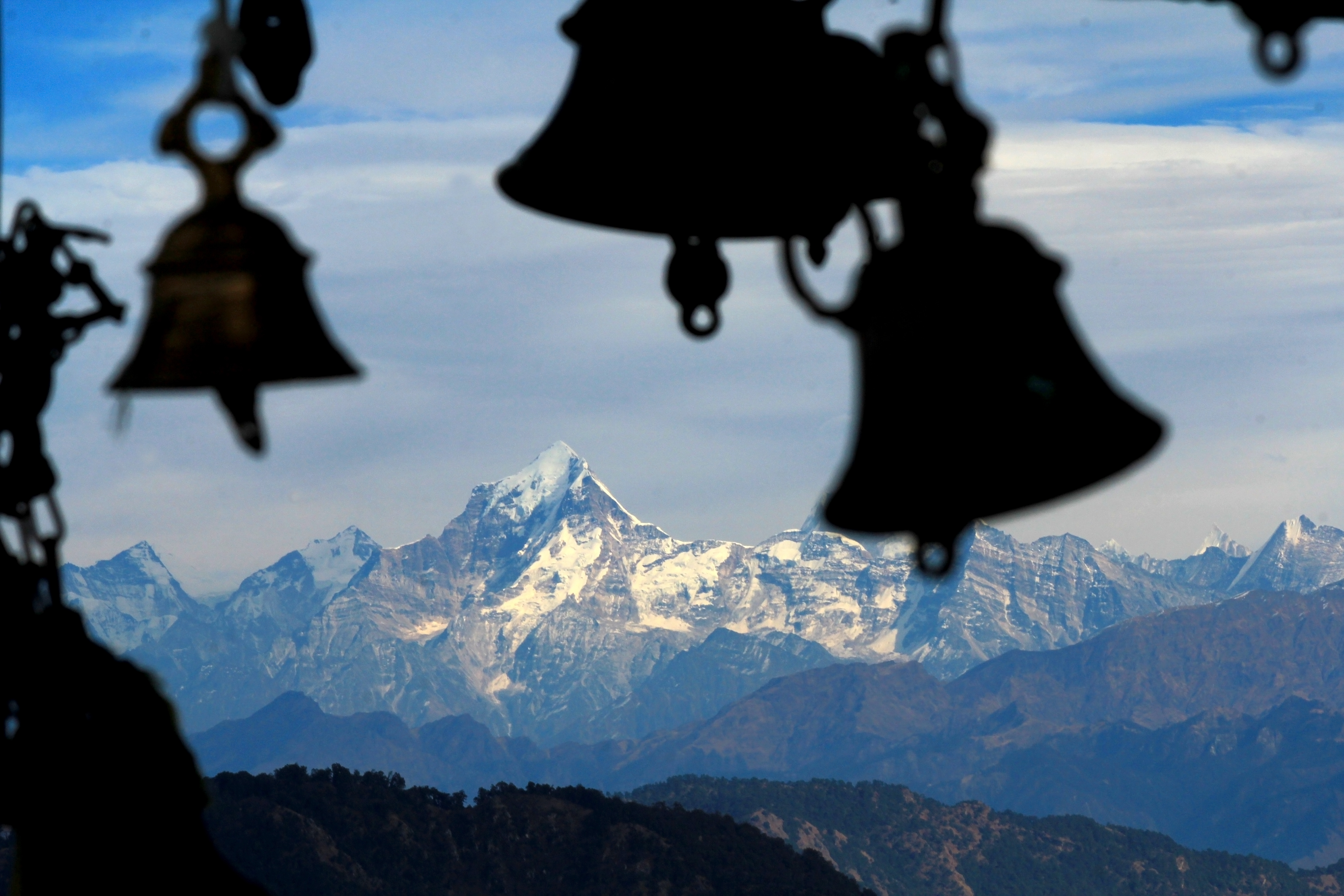
Dunagiri peak from Kartik Swami Temple

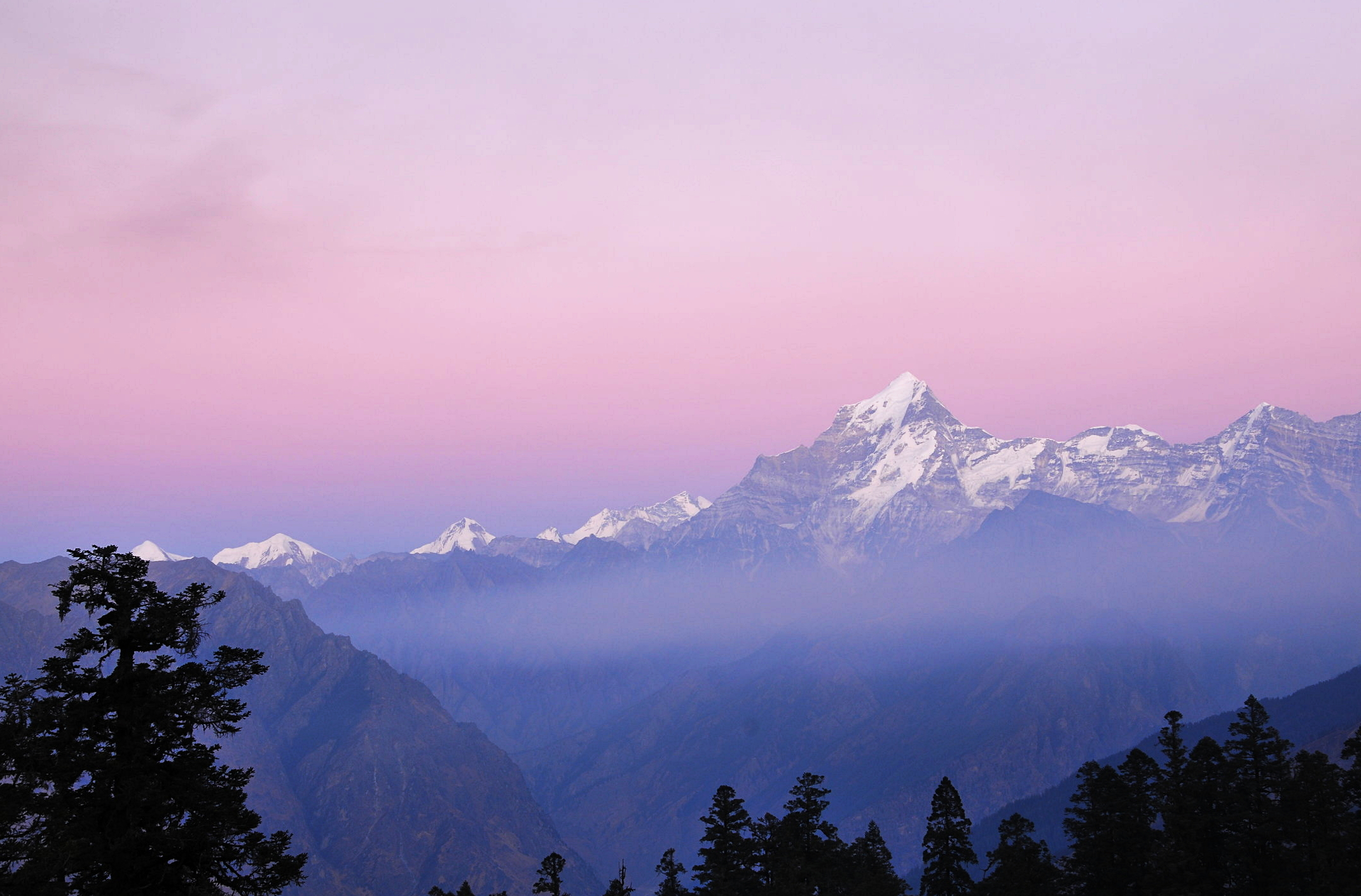
Dunagiri from Kuari Pass

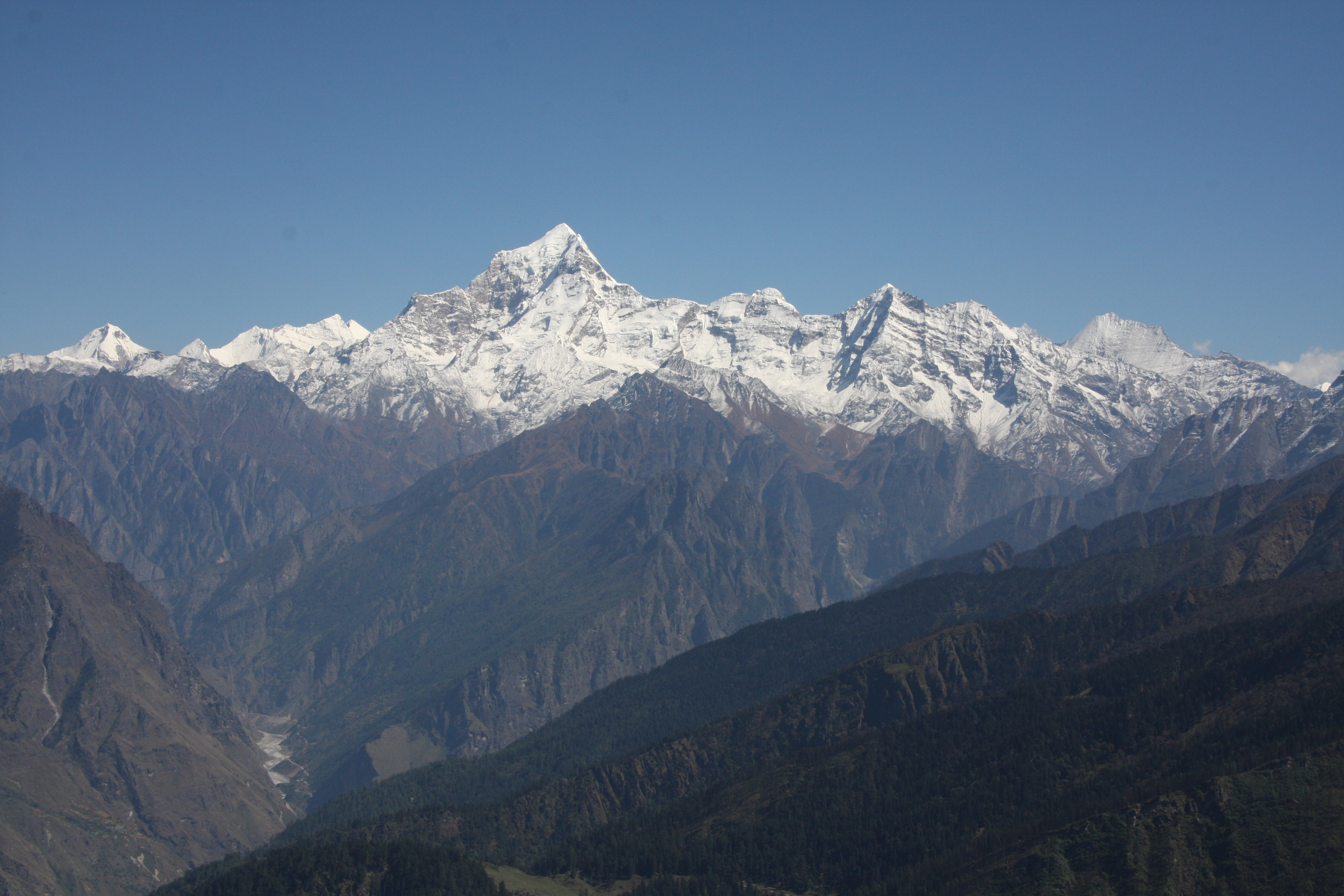
Dunagiri from Kuari Pass
