= Fritz Steuri (disambiguation) =

Fritz Steuri may refer to:

- Fritz Steuri (1887–1969), Swiss mountain climber and Nordic and Alpine skier
- Fritz Steuri II (1903–1955), Swiss mountain climber and Nordic and Alpine skier
- Fritz Steuri III (1908–1953), Swiss ski jumpers and Nordic combined skiers
