= Fritz Steuri (alpine skier, born 1903) =

Swiss alpine skier (1903–1955)

Personal information
- Born: 1903 Grindelwald, Switzerland
- Died: 9 August 1955 (aged 51–52) Gross Grünhorn, Switzerland

Skiing career
- Sport: Alpine skiing
- Disciplines: Polyvalent

World Championships
- Teams: 3
- Medals: 3 (0 gold)
Medal record
World Championship
Silver medal – second place	1933 Innsbruck	Combined
Bronze medal – third place	1931 Mürren	Downhill
Bronze medal – third place	1933 Innsbruck	Slalom

Fritz Steuri also known as Fritz Steuri II (1903 - 9 August 1955) was a Swiss alpine ski racer who competed at three editions of the FIS Alpine World Ski Championships (1931, 1932, 1933).

== World Championship results ==
Edition	Slalom	Downhill	Combined
1931	-	3	-
1932	5	7	7
1933	3	4	2

== See also ==
- Fritz Steuri
- Fritz Steuri III
