= Ladies' Ski Club =

The Ladies' Ski Club was founded in 1923, at the suggestion of Arnold Lunn, by Doreen Elliott, Mrs Duncan Harvey and Lunn's wife, (Lady) Mabel Lunn. It was the first club for women who wanted to ski.

== History ==
The Ladies' Ski Club (LSC) was founded in 1923 at the Palace Hotel on Mürren. The first Swiss club for women, Schweizerischer Damen-Skiclub, followed some years later which established some international rivalry. Greta, Lady Raeburn led the LSC to victory three times in friendly races.

The first Alpine Ski Club had been created by Lunn in 1908 and, although popular, it denied membership to women. Lunn believed that skiing was an attractive sport for women and he wanted to ensure that Britain had the first ski club for women. It was suggested, but denied, that his purpose was actually to dissuade women from joining the Alpine Club.

In 1929 a letter was received inviting the British to send skiers to compete in an event in Poland. The organisers in Zakopane were surprised to find that the British team included LSC founder members Doreen Elliott and Audrey Sale-Barker as the only races they were qualified to race were designated as for men only. The ladies were allowed to join the skiers on the condition that they could not win prizes. The other competitors were impressed when Doreen finished 13th and Audrey 14th.

In time the ski club was involved in providing delegates to organise larger international events with the FIS.

== Notable members ==
- Doreen Elliott
- Esme Mackinnon
- Evelyn Pinching
- Audrey Sale-Barker
