= Doreen Elliott =

British skier

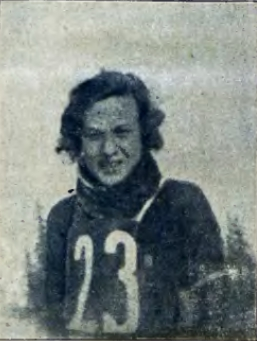
- in Zakopane in 1929

Personal information
- Born: 1908
- Died: 1966 (aged 57–58)
Medal record
Representing United Kingdom
World Championships
| Bronze medal – third place | 1932 Cortina d'Ampezzo | Slalom |

Doreen Elliott (1908–1966) was a British skier. She was a co-founder of the Ladies' Ski Club and rose to be its president.

== Life ==
Elliott was born in 1908 and she was one of the three women chosen by Arnold Lunn to found the Ladies' Ski Club in 1923. Elliott served as the club's secretary for several years.

In 1928 Lunn created the Inferno race. Elliott was one of four female entrants. She finished fourth. This was despite helping another competitor with a broken rib. The Inferno race was still running in 2013. Elliott was the second woman in the Arlberg-Kandahar race. She won the slalom as well as taking fourth place in the downhill.

In 1929 a letter was received inviting the British to send skiers to compete in an event in Poland. The organisers in Zakopane were surprised to find that the British team included Elliott and another LSC founder member Audrey Sale-Barker. Elliott and Sale-Barker were allowed to join the skiers and the competitors were impressed when they finished 13th and 14th.

Elliott took part in the FIS Alpine World Ski Championships in 1932. She became president of the club she founded from 1935 to 1938. When she died in 1966 she left her book collection to the club.
