= Gretl Weikert =

Austrian alpine skier (born 1914)

Personal information
- Nationality: Austrian
- Born: 25 September 1914; Budapest, Austria-Hungary

Sport
- Sport: Alpine skiing

Gretl Weikert
Medal record

Women's Alpine skiing

Representing Austria

World Championships
Bronze medal – third place	1936 Innsbruck	Slalom

Gretl Weikert (born 25 September 1914, date of death unknown) was an Austrian alpine skier. She competed in the FIS Alpine World Ski Championships 1936, where she won bronze in slalom. She also competed in the women's combined event at the Winter Olympics the same year.
