= Austria at the FIS Alpine World Ski Championships 2021 =

Austria at the 2021 FIS Alpine World Ski Championships
- IOC code: AUT
- National federation: Österreichischer Skiverband
- Website: www.oesv.at

in (Italy) Cortina d'Ampezzo
- Competitors: 24 (13 men, 11 women)
- Medals Ranked 1st: Gold 5 Silver 1 Bronze 2 Total 8

FIS Alpine World Ski Championships appearances
- 1931; 1932; 1933; 1934; 1935; 1936; 1937; 1938; 1939; 1948; 1950; 1952; 1954; 1956; 1958; 1960; 1962; 1964; 1966; 1968; 1970; 1972; 1974; 1976; 1978; 1980; 1982; 1985; 1987; 1989; 1991; 1993; 1996; 1997; 1999; 2001; 2003; 2005; 2007; 2009; 2011; 2013; 2015; 2017; 2019; 2021

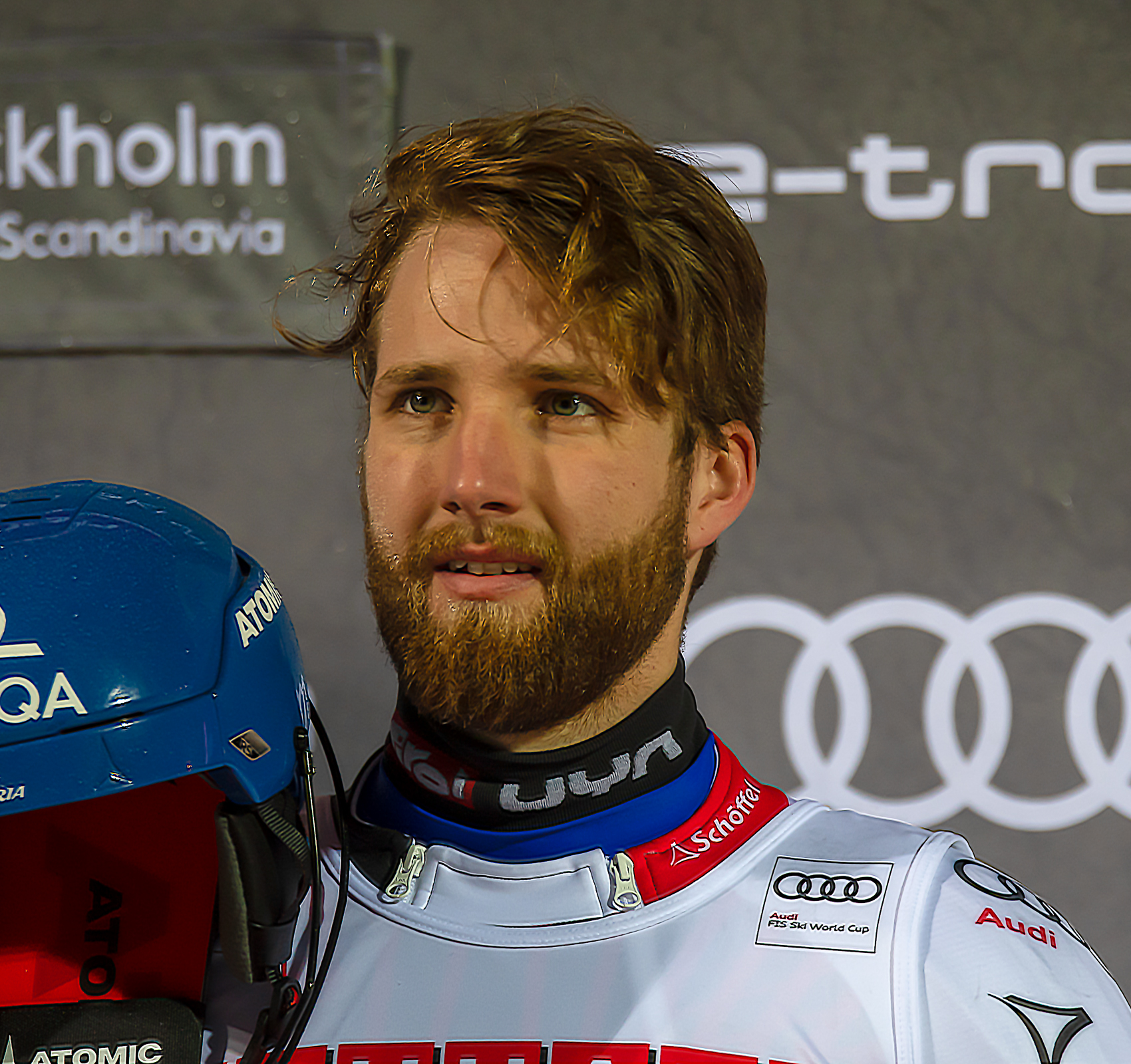
Marco Schwarz two medals (one gold) at Cortina 2021.

Austria competed at the FIS Alpine World Ski Championships 2021 in Cortina d'Ampezzo, Austria, from 8 to 21 February 2021.

== Medalists ==
Athlete	Gendre	Event	Medal
Vincent Kriechmayr	Men	Downhill	GOLD
Vincent Kriechmayr	Men	Super-G	GOLD
Marco Schwarz	Men	Alpine combined	GOLD
Katharina Liensberger	Women	Slalom	GOLD
Katharina Liensberger	Women	Parallel giant slalom	GOLD
Adrian Pertl	Men	Slalom	SILVER
Marco Schwarz	Men	Giant slalom	BRONZE
Katharina Liensberger	Women	Giant slalom	BRONZE
