= Audrey Sale-Barker =

British alpine skiing champion and prominent aviator

Medal record

Representing United Kingdom

Women's Alpine skiing

World Championships
Silver medal – second place	1932 Cortina d'Ampezzo	Slalom

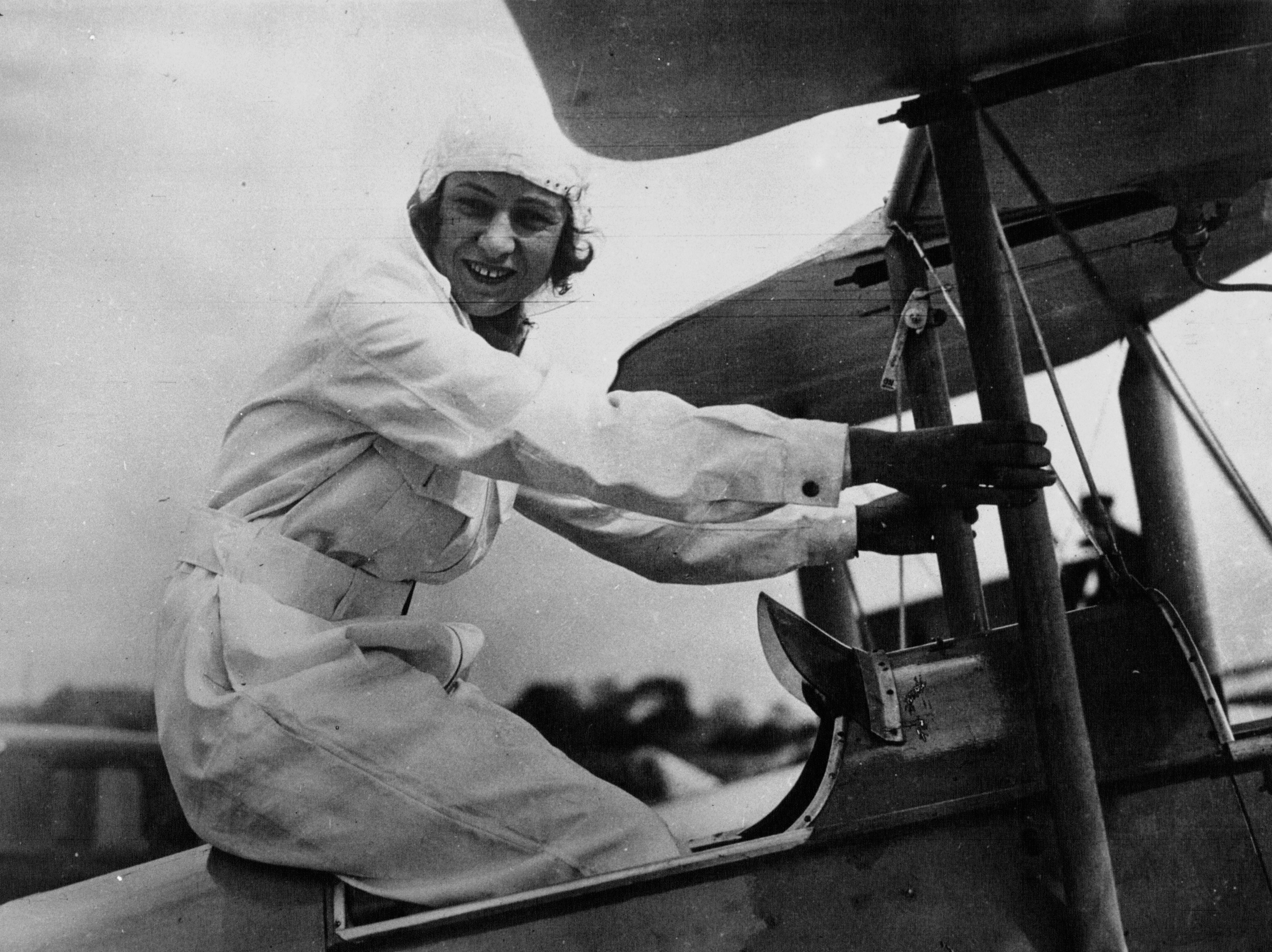
Flying in 1932

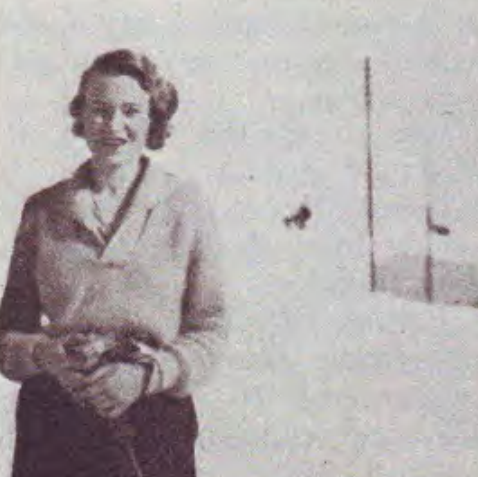
Skiing in 1939

Audrey Florice Durell "Wendy" Drummond Sale-Barker (1903 – 21 December 1994) was a British alpine skiing champion and prominent aviator. She captained the British women's team at the 1936 Winter Olympics. She earned her pilot's licence from the Royal Aero Club in 1929 and embarked on a flight to South Africa in 1932. During World War II she flew as a ferry pilot of the Air Transport Auxiliary. After her marriage to George Douglas-Hamilton, 10th Earl of Selkirk in 1947, she became Audrey Douglas-Hamilton, Countess of Selkirk.

== Early life ==
Audrey Durell Drummond Sale-Barker was born in Chelsea, London in 1903. Her father was Maurice Drummond Sale-Barker. Her grandmother was children's writer Lucy Sale-Barker.

== Skiing career ==
An inaugural member of the Ladies' Ski Club organized by Sir Arnold Lunn, she was the first female skier to win the diamond badge at the prestigious Arlberg-Kandahar race, signifying at least four top-three finishes in the combined race. She won the combined title at the second A-K race, held in St. Anton in 1929.

American skier Alice Kiare described Sale-Barker as a striking figure:

Audrey Sale-Barker made an extraordinary impression on everybody who saw her ski. Very tall, extremely slim, her height accentuated by trousers so long that they touched the ground around her boots, pale honey-coloured hair, a vague dreamy expression, and when she skied I can only describe her as a sleep-walker. She stood very erect, with both arms slightly lifted in front of her, she had little or no reserve strength in a race, gave everything she had, and often collapsed and fainted when a race was over. She had incredible courage, and I will never forget seeing her take the last steep slope of Dengert at the finish of the 1928 Arlberg-Kandahar absolutely straight, with lifted arms like someone in a trance.

—

In 1929 a letter was received inviting the British to send skiers to compete in an event in Poland. The organisers in Zakopane were surprised to find that the British team included Sale-Barker and another LSC founder member Doreen Elliott. Elliott and Sale-Barker were allowed to join the skiing competition and the skiers were impressed when they finished 13th and 14th.

Sale-Barker was captain of the British women's team at the 1936 Winter Olympics, held at Garmisch-Partenkirchen, Germany, the first Olympics to include alpine skiing.

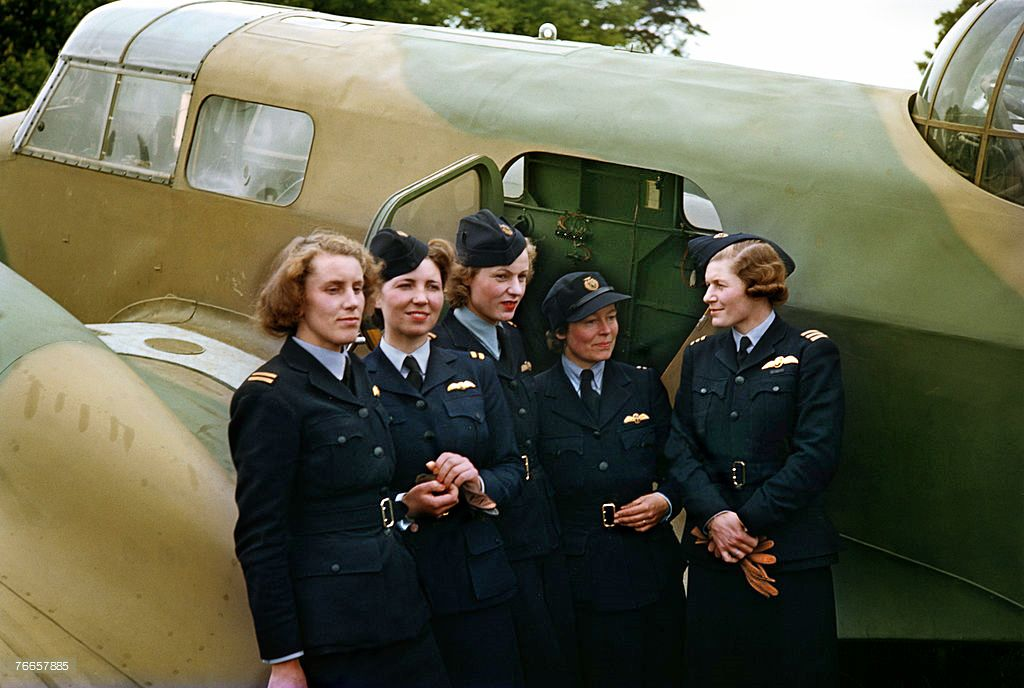
Five ATA flyers Lettice Curtis, Jenny Broad, Audrey Sale-Barker, Gabrielle Patterson and Pauline Gower in 1942 by an Airspeed Oxford trainer

== Aviation ==
In 1929, Sale-Barker earned her 'ticket' from the Royal Aero Club (RAeC). In October and November 1932, she and another female pilot, Joan Page, flew from London to Cape Town in a de Havilland Gipsy Moth. They were held up for a time in Cairo when the Sudanese authorities wouldn't permit them to fly through the country. On their return from Cape Town, they crashed near Nairobi; Page broke her leg, and Sale-Barker suffered a minor head injury. According to one contemporaneous account, the women were sighted by scouting plane and then located by a rescue party. But according to another, more persistent account, the aviators were saved when a Maasai tribesman came upon them, and Sale-Barker sent him for help with a note written in lipstick, reading "Please come and fetch us. We've had an aircrash AND ARE HURT." She had the note framed and it hung in her Dorset home.

In June 1940, Sale-Barker joined the Women's Section of the Air Transport Auxiliary (ATA), the organisation responsible for ferrying military aircraft from the aircraft-factories to the RAF units. She was a close friend of famed ATA pilot Amy Johnson. On 30 November 1945, it was Sale-Barker who was charged with lowering the ATA flag for the last time.

== Marriage and later life ==
On 6 August 1947, she married fellow aviator George Douglas-Hamilton, 10th Earl of Selkirk, one of the legendary Douglas-Hamilton brothers, all four of whom had distinguished wartime careers in the RAF. On her marriage she became Audrey Douglas-Hamilton, Countess of Selkirk. The couple had no children.

She died in Dorset on 21 December 1994, just one month after her husband. In a remembrance written a few days after her death by her sister-in-law, Elizabeth Douglas-Hamilton, Duchess of Hamilton and Brandon, she described her postwar married life as a selfless one, dedicated to supporting her husband and those in need.

The Scottish Conservative politician James Douglas-Hamilton was her nephew.
