= Gerda Paumgarten =

Austrian alpine skier (1907–2000)

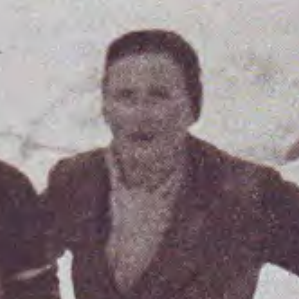
- Gerda Paumgarten c.1939

Personal information
- Nationality: Austrian
- Born: 4 February 1907 Graz, Austria-Hungary
- Died: 1 January 2000 (aged 92) Vienna, Austria

Sport
- Country: Austria
- Sport: Alpine skiing
Medal record
Representing Austria
Women's Alpine skiing
World Championships
Gold medal – first place	1936 Innsbruck	Slalom
Silver medal – second place	1933 Innsbruck	Combined
Bronze medal – third place	1933 Innsbruck	Downhill
Bronze medal – third place	1936 Innsbruck	Combined

Gerda Gräfin Paumgarten-Hohenschwangau (4 February 1907 – 1 January 2000) was an Austrian alpine skier and world champion.

Paumgarten received a gold medal at the 1936 World Championships in Innsbruck, winning the slalom event. She was the younger sister of Olympic skier Harald Paumgarten (1904–1952).
