= 1930–31 Sheffield Shield season =

Australian cricket tournament

- Cricket format: First-class
- Tournament format: Double round-robin
- Champions: Victoria (13th title)
- Participants: 4
- Matches: 12
- Most runs: Don Bradman (New South Wales) (695)
- Most wickets: Bert Ironmonger (Victoria) (29)

The 1930–31 Sheffield Shield season was the 35th season of the Sheffield Shield, the domestic first-class cricket competition of Australia. Victoria won the championship.

== Points system ==
- 5 points for a win
- 3 points for a win on first innings
- 2 points for a draw
- 1 point for a loss on first innings

== Table ==
Team	Played	Won	1st Inns Won	1st Inns Lost	Lost	Drawn	Points
Victoria	6	1	2	1	0	2	16
New South Wales	6	2	0	3	0	1	15
Queensland	6	1	2	0	2	1	13
South Australia	6	1	1	1	3	0	9

== Statistics ==
=== Most Runs ===
Don Bradman 695

=== Most Wickets ===
Bert Ironmonger 29
