= Esme Mackinnon =

British alpine skier (1913–1999)

Medal record

Representing United Kingdom

Women's Alpine skiing

World Championships
Gold medal – first place	1931 Mürren	Slalom
Gold medal – first place	1931 Mürren	Downhill

Esmé Mackinnon (2 December 1913 – 9 July 1999), known as Muffie, was a British alpine skier from Edinburgh, Scotland, remembered as the first female FIS World Champion in both downhill and slalom. She was a member of the Ladies' Ski Club which was the first skiing club for women.

The editors of Ski magazine called Mackinnon and fellow British skier Audrey Sale-Barker "probably the first women who could really be called racers." Sir Arnold Lunn wrote that she "had the most remarkable record of any lady racer." In addition to her world championships, Mackinnon won the slalom and combined titles at the prestigious Arlberg-Kandahar races in March 1933, in Mürren, Switzerland.

After her skiing success, she married one L. M. Murphy.

== 1931 World Championships ==
At the age of 17, Mackinnon received two gold medals at the 1931 World Championships in Mürren, Switzerland, winning both the slalom and the downhill. The races were held in deep, soft snow conditions that presented no problem for Mackinnon.

Mackinnon also won a third, unofficial race at the 1931 Championships, from Grütschalp to Lauterbrunnen. As Mackinnon approached the finish in Lauterbrunnen, she encountered a funeral procession passing by and stopped to wait. The timekeeper stopped the clock and then restarted it when she resumed her run. Some sources maintain that Mackinnon did this out of respect for the departed. According to Lunn's first-hand account, though, Mackinnon stopped out of necessity:

An incident unique in ski-ing history occurred at the finish. The finishing posts had been placed just outside the Lauterbrunnen station. Shortly before Miss Mackinnon appeared, a funeral procession emerged from the station and passed between Miss Mackinnon and the finishing posts. Miss Mackinnon naturally stopped, and her time was taken to the point where she stopped, and from the point where she stopped till she had passed through the finishing posts. She lost, of course, a few seconds for she had to start again on the level instead of being carried through the posts by her impetus. The Austrians put in a protest, alleging that the time that the funeral procession had taken to pass should be added to her time. This struck us as rather odd for the object of a race is surely to prove that you have skied faster than your rivals, and not that you are entitled to a prize as the result of the opportune intervention of a funeral procession. (p. 79)

In any case, the Austrian protest was dismissed and Mackinnon was named the winner. Her final time was 10 minutes, 4.4 seconds.
