= FIS Alpine World Ski Championships 1933 =

Skiing event in Innsbruck, Austria

- Host city: Innsbruck
- Country: Austria
- Events: 6
- Opening: 6 February 1933
- Closing: 10 February 1933
- Opened by: Wilhelm Miklas

The FIS Alpine World Ski Championships 1933 in alpine skiing were the third edition of the competition, organized by the International Ski Federation (FIS) and held in Innsbruck, Austria in February 1933.

== Men's events ==
Event	Gold	Silver	Bronze
Downhill	Walter Prager (SUI)	David Zogg (SUI)	Hans Hauser (AUT)
Slalom	Anton Seelos (AUT)	Gustav Lantschner (AUT)	Fritz Steuri (SUI)
Combined	Anton Seelos (AUT)	Fritz Steuri (SUI)	Otto Furrer (SUI)

== Women's events ==
Event	Gold	Silver	Bronze
Downhill	Inge Wersin-Lantschner (AUT)	Nini von Arx-Zogg (SUI)	Gerda Paumgarten (AUT)
Slalom	Inge Wersin-Lantschner (AUT)	Helena Boughton (GBR)	Helena Zingg (SUI)
Combined	Inge Wersin-Lantschner (AUT)	Gerda Paumgarten (AUT)	Jeanette Kessler (GBR)

== Medal table ==
* Host nation (Austria)

Rank	Nation	Gold	Silver	Bronze	Total
1	Austria (AUT)*	5	2	2	9
2	Switzerland (SUI)	1	3	3	7
3	Great Britain (GBR)	0	1	1	2
Totals (3 entries)		6	6	6	18

== See also ==
- Austria at the FIS Alpine World Ski Championships 1933
- Italy at the FIS Alpine World Ski Championships 1933
