= FIS Alpine World Ski Championships 1931 =

Skiing event in Mürren, Switzerland

Coordinates: 46.559°N 7.892°E

- Poster
- Host city: Mürren
- Country: Switzerland
- Nations: 7
- Events: 4
- Opening: 19 February 1931
- Closing: 23 February 1931
- Opened by: Heinrich Häberlin

Location in the Alps of Europe

The FIS Alpine World Ski Championships 1931 were held 19–23 February in Mürren, Switzerland. These were the inaugural world championships for alpine skiing organized by the International Ski Federation (FIS), and consisted of downhill and slalom events for men and women.

== Participating nations ==
- Australia (AUS)
- Austria (AUT)
- Germany (GER)
- Great Britain (GBR)
- Italy (ITA)
- Switzerland (SUI)

== Men's competitions ==
=== Slalom ===
| Place | Skier | Country | Time | Penalty |
|---|---|---|---|---|
| 1 | David Zogg | Switzerland (SUI) | 0:54.6 | — |
| 2 | Toni Seelos | Austria (AUT) | 0:55.5 | — |
| 3 | Friedl Däuber | Germany (GER) | 0:55.8 | — |
| 4 | William James Riddel | Great Britain (GBR) | 0:57.9 | — |
| 5 | Walter Prager | Switzerland (SUI) | 1:01.1 | — |
| 6 | Martin Neuner | Germany (GER) | 1:01.6 | — |
| 7 | Peter Lunn | Great Britain (GBR) | 1:02.5 | — |
| 8 | Hansgeorg von Weech | Germany (GER) | 1:02.5 | — |
| 9 | William Bracken | Great Britain (GBR) | 1:02.7 | 6.0 |
| 10 | Ulrich Neuner | Germany (GER) | 1:04.8 | 6.0 |

=== Downhill ===
2 February 1931 (started 25, finished 25).

| Place | Skier | Country | Time |
|---|---|---|---|
| 1st place, gold medalist(s) | Walter Prager | Switzerland (SUI) | 1:56.2 |
| 2nd place, silver medalist(s) | Otto Furrer | Switzerland (SUI) | 2:18.0 |
| 3rd place, bronze medalist(s) | Fritz Steuri II | Switzerland (SUI) | 2:21.8 |
| 4 | Ernst Feuz | Switzerland (SUI) | 2:22.2 |
| 5 | Gustav Lantschner | Austria (AUT) | 2:31.0 |
| 6 | Otto Lantschner | Austria (AUT) | 2:34.4 |
| 7 | Antony Bulwer-Lytton | Great Britain (GBR) | 2:42.8 |
| 8 | Harald Reinl | Austria (AUT) | 2:48.8 |
| 9 | Hans von Weech | Germany (GER) | 2:53.8 |
| 10 | David Zogg | Switzerland (SUI) | 2:55.0 |

== Medal summary ==
=== Men's events ===
| Event | Gold | Silver | Bronze |
|---|---|---|---|
| Downhill | Walter Prager (SUI) | Otto Furrer (SUI) | Fritz Steuri II (SUI) |
| Slalom | David Zogg (SUI) | Anton Seelos (AUT) | Friedl Däuber (GER) |

=== Women's events ===
| Event | Gold | Silver | Bronze |
|---|---|---|---|
| Downhill | Esme Mackinnon (GBR) | Nell Carroll (GBR) | Irma Schmiedegg (AUT) |
| Slalom | Esme Mackinnon (GBR) | Inge Wersin-Lantschner (AUT) | Jeanette Kessler (GBR) |

== Medal table ==
Host nation is highlighted

* Host nation (Switzerland)

| Rank | Nation | Gold | Silver | Bronze | Total |
|---|---|---|---|---|---|
| 1 | Great Britain (GBR) | 2 | 1 | 1 | 4 |
| 1 | Switzerland (SUI)* | 2 | 1 | 1 | 4 |
| 3 | Austria (AUT) | 0 | 2 | 1 | 3 |
| 4 | Germany (GER) | 0 | 0 | 1 | 1 |
| Totals (4 entries) | | 4 | 4 | 4 | 12 |

== See also ==
- Italy at the FIS Alpine World Ski Championships 1931
