= FIS Alpine World Ski Championships 1932 =

Skiing event in Cortina d'Ampezzo, Italy

Coordinates: 46.533°N 12.133°E

- Host city: Cortina d'Ampezzo
- Country: Italy
- Events: 6
- Opening: 4 February 1932
- Closing: 6 February 1932
- Opened by: Victor Emmanuel III

Location in the Alps of Europe

The FIS Alpine World Ski Championships 1932 were held 4–6 February in Cortina d'Ampezzo, Italy, the second edition of the FIS Alpine World Ski Championships alpine skiing competition and organized by the International Ski Federation (FIS). The combined event was added to the program.

Alpine skiing was not yet a part of the Winter Olympics in 1932, held 4–15 February in Lake Placid, New York; it was added to the Olympic program in 1936 in Garmisch-Partenkirchen, Germany.

== Men's events ==
Event	Gold	Silver	Bronze
Downhill	Gustav Lantschner (AUT)	David Zogg (SUI)	Otto Furrer (SUI)
Slalom	Friedl Däuber (GER)	Otto Furrer (SUI)	Hans Hauser (AUT)
Combined	Otto Furrer (SUI)	Hans Hauser (AUT)	Gustav Lantschner (AUT)

== Women's events ==
Event	Gold	Silver	Bronze
Downhill	Paula Wiesinger (ITA)	Inge Wersin-Lantschner (AUT)	Hady Lantschner (AUT)
Slalom	Rösli Streiff (SUI)	Durell Sale-Barker (GBR)	Doreen Elliott (GBR)
Combined	Rösli Streiff (SUI)	Inge Wersin-Lantschner (AUT)	Hady Lantschner (AUT)

== Medal table ==
* Host nation (Italy)

Rank	Nation	Gold	Silver	Bronze	Total
1	Switzerland (SUI)	3	2	1	6
2	Austria (AUT)	1	3	4	8
3	Germany (GER)	1	0	0	1
3	Italy (ITA)*	1	0	0	1
5	Great Britain (GBR)	0	1	1	2
Totals (5 entries)		6	6	6	18

== See also ==
- Italy at the FIS Alpine World Ski Championships 1932
