= Inge Wersin-Lantschner =

Austrian alpine skier (1905–1997)

Medal record

Representing Austria

Women's Alpine skiing

World Championships
Gold medal – first place	1933 Innsbruck	Slalom
Gold medal – first place	1933 Innsbruck	Downhill
Gold medal – first place	1933 Innsbruck	Combined
Silver medal – second place	1931 Mürren	Slalom
Silver medal – second place	1932 Cortina	Downhill
Silver medal – second place	1932 Cortina	Combined

Inge Wersin-Lantschner, née Inge Lantschner (26 January 1905 in Innsbruck – 16 June 1997 in Innsbruck) was an Austrian alpine skier and world champion.

Wersin-Lantschner received three gold medals at the 1933 World Championships in Innsbruck, winning the slalom, the downhill and combined events.
