= William Bracken =

William Bracken was an American hunter, tradesman, and surveyor who explored Kentucky in the last decades of the 18th century. In 1773 he traveled down the Kentucky River with brothers George, Robert, and James McAffee. They surveyed the area around present day Frankfort and Harrodsburg. Their surveys of what is now Bracken County, named for William Bracken, were among the first made in Kentucky.

Bracken later explored Ohio and settled either along the Little or Big Bracken, creeks which empty into the Ohio River. He was killed by hostile Indians during the Northwest Indian War. William Bracken is the namesake of Bracken County, Kentucky.
