= Richard Waghorn =

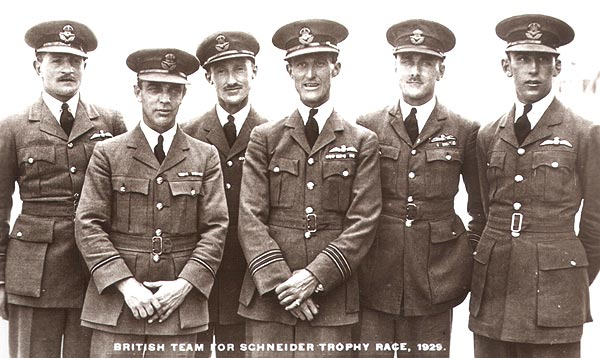
- British 1929 Schneider Trophy Team (Waghorn first from the left)
- Born: 6 September 1904; Brompton, London, England
- Died: 7 May 1931 (aged 26); Farnborough, Hampshire, England
- Military career
- Allegiance: United Kingdom
- Branch: Royal Air Force
- Service years: 1924–1931
- Rank: Flight Lieutenant
- Unit: Royal Aircraft Establishment
- Awards: Air Force Cross

Henry Richard Danvers Waghorn, AFC (6 September 1904 – 7 May 1931) was a British aviator and Royal Air Force officer who flew the winning aircraft in the 1929 Schneider Trophy seaplane race.

== Early life ==
Waghorn was born on 6 September 1904 at Brompton, London, the son of a civil engineer.

In 1924 Waghorn became a cadet at the Royal Air Force College Cranwell. When he passed out in August that year he was awarded the Sword of Honour as the best all-round cadet. He was posted to No. 17 Squadron flying the Sopwith Snipe fighter. After a few years he was sent on a flying instructor's course at the Central Flying School (CFS). Following the course he stayed with the CFS as a qualified flying instructor. In February 1929 he was posted to the Marine Aircraft Experimental Establishment at Felixstowe to train as part of the British team to contest the 1929 Schneider Trophy.

== Schneider Trophy ==
After training, the British team moved to Calshot in April 1929 to prepare for the race against France, Italy, and the United States. The race was held on 6 September 1929 and was won by Waghorn flying his Supermarine S.6. He completed the course in 39 minutes 42 seconds at an average speed of 328.63 mph (529 km/h). Waghorn was also to claim world record speeds for seaplanes, although teammate Richard Atcherley later registered higher speeds when he completed his laps of the circuit. But Waghorn had the highest average speed and the United Kingdom retained the trophy for the second time, following the team win in 1927. After winning the trophy, Waghorn was awarded the Air Force Cross. The award was announced in the London Gazette of 20 September 1929, reading:

The King has been graciously pleased to approve the award of the Air Force Cross to Flying Officer Henry Richard Danvers Waghorn in recognition of his achievement winning the recent "Schneider Trophy" Air Race.

Waghorn continued to fly after the race, mainly concerned with experimental and high-speed flying.

== Family and sport ==
Waghorn married Dollie Watson on 15 June 1929 and they had a son, John. Dick Waghorn had an interest in skiing and was second in a 3.75 miles (6.0 km) race in the 1930 British Ski Championship and was a member of the Great Britain team.

== Death ==
On 5 May 1931 Waghorn was test flying a Hawker Horsley biplane bomber from Farnborough when he lost control in high winds; he and his passenger, a civilian assistant named E. R. Alexander, parachuted from the aircraft. Alexander landed on the roof of a factory and had minor injuries but Waghorn was seriously injured and died on 7 May. The Horsley was being used to carry out experiments with radiators and had a prototype Rolls-Royce Buzzard engine fitted rather than the normal Condor. An inquest returned a verdict of accidental death.
