= Otto Furrer =

Swiss alpine and cross-country skier (1903–1951)

Personal information
- Born: 19 October 1903 Zermatt, Switzerland
- Died: 26 July 1951 (aged 47) Matterhorn, Switzerland

Sport
- Sport: Skiing
Medal record
Representing Switzerland
Men's Alpine skiing
World Championships
Gold medal – first place	1932 Cortina d'Ampezzo	Combined
Silver medal – second place	1931 Mürren	Downhill
Silver medal – second place	1932 Cortina d'Ampezzo	Slalom
Bronze medal – third place	1932 Cortina d'Ampezzo	Downhill
Bronze medal – third place	1933 Innsbruck	Combined

Otto Furrer (19 October 1903 – 26 July 1951) was a Swiss alpine skier and cross-country skier and world champion born in Zermatt.

At the second winter Olympics in St. Moritz in 1928, he competed on the Swiss team in the military patrol demonstration sport where the team placed third. Furrer also participated in a cross-country skiing event.

== Cross-country skiing results ==
=== Olympic Games ===
Year	Age	18 km	50 km
1928	24	21	—

== Alpine skiing ==
In the 1931, 1932 and 1934 Arlberg-Kandahar races, he won the Men's downhill and alpine combined, and also won slalom in 1932 (tie) and 1934, with second place slalom runs in 1930 and 1931.

Competing in FIS Alpine World Ski Championships, in 1931 Furrer was second in downhill. Furrer won the combined world championship in 1932 (second in slalom and third in downhill), and in 1933 was third in the combined.

He was co-founder of the ski resort at Zermatt where he operated a ski school from 1935 until his death in an accident on the Matterhorn.
