= Friedl Däuber =

German skier (1911–1997)

Medal record

Representing Germany

Men's Alpine skiing

World Championship
Gold medal – first place	1932 Cortina D'Ampezzo	Slalom
Bronze medal – third place	1931 Mürren	Slalom

Friedl Däuber (5 January 1911 – 1 May 1997) was a German alpine and cross-country skier who competed in the 1936 Winter Olympics.

He was born and died in Berchtesgaden.

In 1936 he was a member of the German cross-country relay team which finished sixth in the 4x10 km relay event.
