= Walter Prager =

Swiss alpine skier (1910–1984)

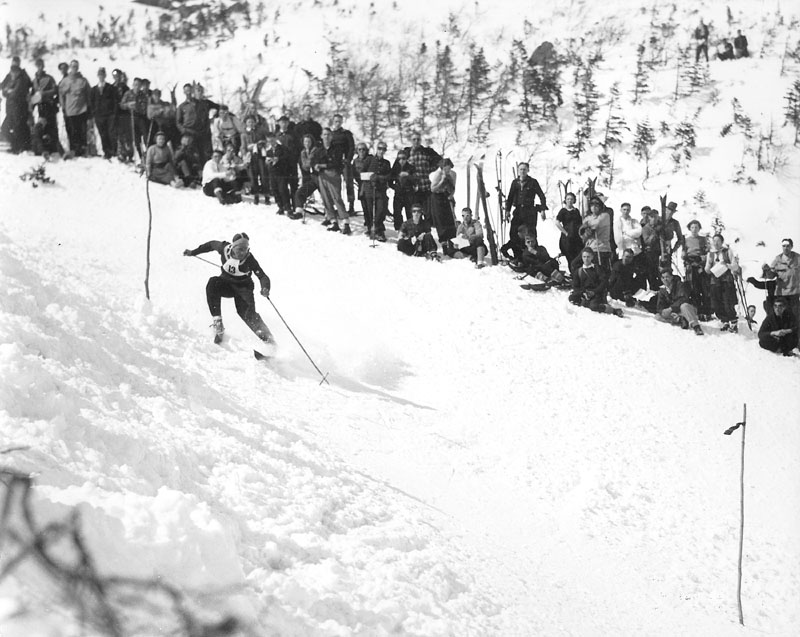

Medal record

Representing Switzerland

Men's Alpine skiing

World Championship
Gold medal – first place	1931 Mürren	Downhill
Gold medal – first place	1933 Innsbruck	Downhill

Walter Prager (2 April 1910 - 28 May 1984) was a Swiss alpine skier.

At the 1931 World Championship in Mürren, Prager became the first World Champion in downhill skiing. He also won the 1933 downhill championship.

Later on, Prager successfully coached the Dartmouth Ski Team both before and after World War II. During the war, he was drafted and was one of the first soldiers to join the 10th Mountain Division.
