= Toni Seelos =

Austrian alpine skier (1911–2006)

Medal record

Men's alpine skiing

Representing Austria

World Championships
Gold medal – first place	1933 Innsbruck	Slalom
Gold medal – first place	1933 Innsbruck	Combined
Gold medal – first place	1935 Mürren	Slalom
Gold medal – first place	1935 Mürren	Combined
Silver medal – second place	1931 Mürren	Slalom

Anton "Toni" Seelos (4 March 1911 – 1 June 2006) was an Austrian alpine skier and world champion.

In the 1930s, Seelos invented the parallel turn and became a world champion in the slalom and alpine combination in 1933, and again in slalom and in combination in 1935.

Seelos worked as professional ski instructor, and was therefore not allowed to participate in the Olympic games. He was also trainer and instructor for Christl Cranz and the French ski team with Emile Allais.

The Toni-Seelos-Olympiaschanze in Seefeld in Tirol is named after him.
