= Fritz Steuri Jr. =

Swiss ski jumper (1908–1953)

Personal information
- Nationality: Swiss
- Born: 11 July 1908 Grindelwald, Switzerland
- Died: 8 July 1953 (aged 44) Grindelwald, Switzerland

Sport
- Sport: Ski jumping

Fritz Steuri Jr. also known as Fritz Steuri III (11 July 1908 – 8 July 1953) was a Swiss ski jumper. He competed in the individual event at the 1932 Winter Olympics.

On 5 July 1939 he made the first ascent of Dunagiri with André Roch and David Zogg during the 1939 Swiss expedition to the Himalayas.
