= Gustav Lantschner =

Austrian-born German alpine skier and actor

Medal record

Men's Alpine skiing

Representing Germany

Winter Olympics
Silver medal – second place	1936 Garmisch-Partenkirchen	Combined

Representing Austria

World Championship
Gold medal – first place	1932 Cortina d'Ampezzo	Downhill
Bronze medal – third place	1932 Cortina d'Ampezzo	Combined
Silver medal – second place	1933 Innsbruck	Slalom

Gustav Adolf "Guzzi" Lantschner (12 August 1910 – 19 March 2011) was an Austrian-born German alpine skier turned actor. He competed in the 1936 Winter Olympics. He was born in Innsbruck, Austria and was the younger brother of Hellmut Lantschner. Competing for Austria, he won the downhill world championship in 1932. At the 1936 Winter Olympics, he won the silver medal in the alpine skiing combined event.
