= David Zogg =

Swiss skier (1902–1977)

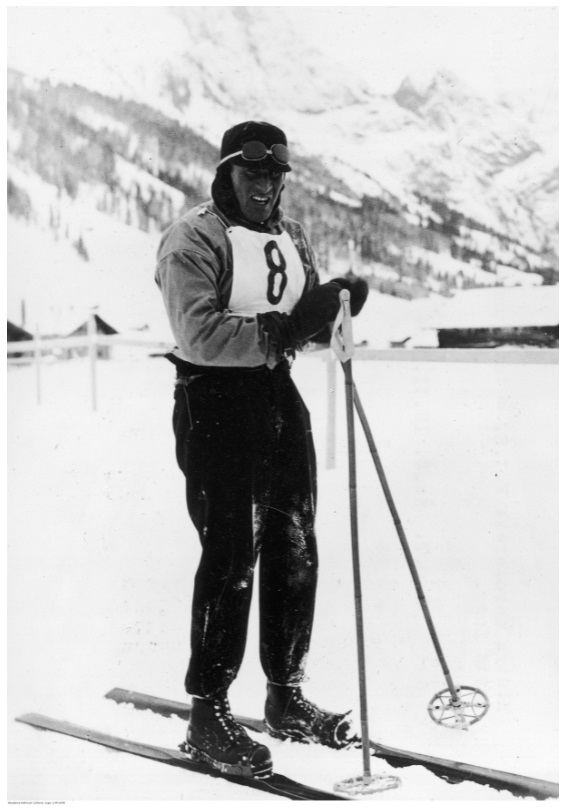

Personal information
- Born: 18 December 1902
- Died: 26 July 1977 (aged 74)

Sport
- Sport: Skiing
Medal record
Representing Switzerland
Men's Alpine skiing
World Championship
Gold medal – first place	1931 Mürren	Slalom
Gold medal – first place	1934 St. Moritz	Downhill
Gold medal – first place	1934 St. Moritz	Combined
Silver medal – second place	1932 Cortina D'Ampezzo	Downhill
Silver medal – second place	1933 Innsbruck	Downhill
Silver medal – second place	1934 St. Moritz	Slalom
Silver medal – second place	1935 Mürren	Slalom

David Zogg (18 December 1902 – 26 July 1977) was a Swiss alpine and Nordic combined skier. He was raised in Arosa, Switzerland.

At the 1928 Winter Olympics in St. Moritz he finished 16th in the Nordic combined event.

In 1931, he won the first World Championship in Slalom and in 1934, he was World Champion in downhill skiing. In the 1930s, he participated in a few films about skiing.

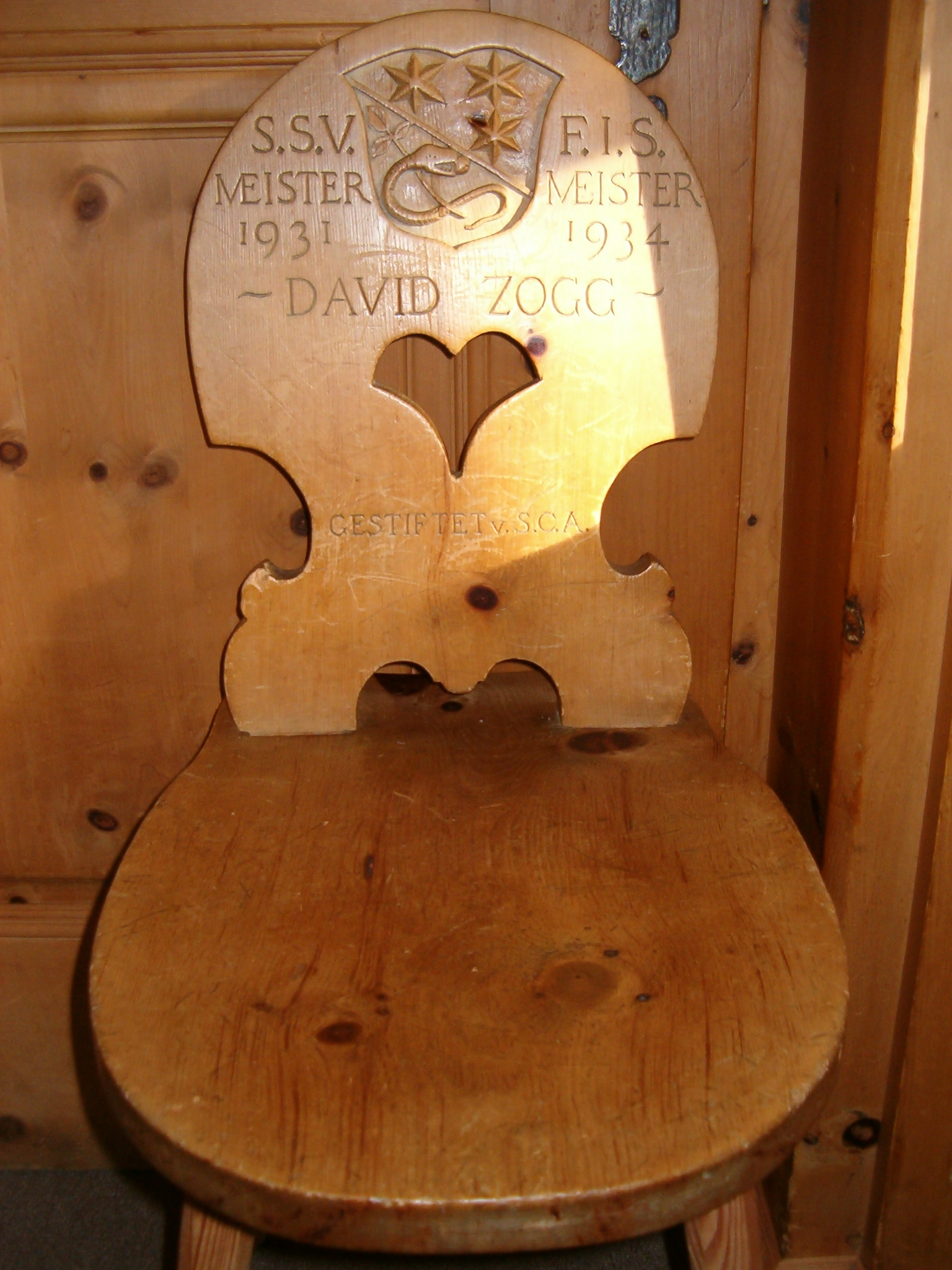
David Zogg's original club chair in the Sattelhütte Arosa

After retiring from ski racing, he was the head of the ski school in Arosa for many years.

David Zogg additionally played a role in opening up the exploration of the Himalayas by being appointed the deputy leader of the 1939 Swiss expedition to the Himalayas, undertaken by the Swiss Foundation for Alpine Research. The outcomes of this were "Exploration of the Ramani glacier basic, first ascent of Dunagiri (7066 m), Rataban (6156 m), Ghori Parbat (6714 m). Attempt on Chaukhamba (7138 m)" There's more about his mountaineering in the German article.

== Filmography ==
- Storm over Mont Blanc (1930)
- The White Ecstasy (1931)
- Die weiße Majestät (1933) from Anton Kutter, August Kern
- Mountain Man (1934) uncredited
- Die weißen Teufel (1935) from Alfred Abel, August Kern
