= France at the 1952 Winter Olympics =

- IOC code: FRA
- NOC: French Olympic Committee

in Oslo, Norway 14–25 February 1952
- Competitors: 26 (20 men, 6 women) in 5 sports
- Flag bearer: Alain Giletti (figure skating)
- Medals Ranked 12th: Gold 0 Silver 0 Bronze 1 Total 1

Winter Olympics appearances (overview)
- 1924; 1928; 1932; 1936; 1948; 1952; 1956; 1960; 1964; 1968; 1972; 1976; 1980; 1984; 1988; 1992; 1994; 1998; 2002; 2006; 2010; 2014; 2018; 2022; 2026

France competed at the 1952 Winter Olympics in Oslo, Norway.

== Medalists ==
Medal	Name	Sport	Event
Bronze	Jacqueline du Bief	Figure skating	Women's singles

== Alpine skiing ==
Men

Athlete	Event	Race 1		Race 2		Total	
Athlete	Event	Time	Rank	Time	Rank	Time	Rank
Guy de Huertas	Downhill					2:54.4	35
Maurice Sanglard	Downhill					2:45.4	25
Henri Oreiller	Downhill					2:41.5	14
James Couttet	Downhill					2:38.7	11
Maurice Sanglard	Giant Slalom					2:38.0	23
Henri Oreiller	Giant Slalom					2:35.3	16
Guy de Huertas	Giant Slalom					2:35.1	15
James Couttet	Giant Slalom					2:34.9	14
Guy de Huertas	Slalom	1:09.1	38	did not advance			
Firmin Mattis	Slalom	1:02.0	12 Q	1:04.0	15	2:06.0	12
Maurice Sanglard	Slalom	1:01.4	8 Q	1:08.6	26	2:10.0	20
James Couttet	Slalom	1:01.1	6 Q	1:01.7	5	2:02.8	6

Women

Athlete	Event	Race 1		Race 2		Total	
Athlete	Event	Time	Rank	Time	Rank	Time	Rank
Jacqueline Martel	Downhill					DSQ	–
Andrée Bermond	Downhill					2:03.1	30
Marysette Agnel	Downhill					1:56.8	22
Marysette Agnel	Giant Slalom					2:18.0	19
Andrée Bermond	Giant Slalom					2:15.2	13
Jacqueline Martel	Giant Slalom					2:14.3	11
Andrée Bermond	Slalom	DSQ	–	–	–	DSQ	–
Marysette Agnel	Slalom	1:07.5	7	1:08.1	11	2:15.6	7

== Bobsleigh ==
Sled	Athletes	Event	Run 1		Run 2		Run 3		Run 4		Total	
Sled	Athletes	Event	Time	Rank	Time	Rank	Time	Rank	Time	Rank	Time	Rank
FRA-1	Robert Guillard; Joseph Chatelus	Two-man	1:29.68	17	1:28.84	17	1:28.71	17	1:28.08	17	5:55.31	17
FRA-2	André Robin; Henri Rivière	Two-man	1:23.22	6	1:23.06	5	1:22.85	5	1:22.85	6	5:31.98	5

Sled	Athletes	Event	Run 1		Run 2		Run 3		Run 4		Total	
Sled	Athletes	Event	Time	Rank	Time	Rank	Time	Rank	Time	Rank	Time	Rank
FRA-1	André Robin; Joseph Chatelus; Louis Saint-Calbre; Henri Rivière	Four-man	1:18.90	6	1:19.91	8	1:19.18	9	1:22.75	14	5:20.74	11

== Cross-country skiing ==
Men

Event	Athlete	Race	
Event	Athlete	Time	Rank
18 km	Benoît Carrara	DNF	–
18 km	Jacques Perrier	1'10:33	33
18 km	Gérard Perrier	1'09:17	24
18 km	René Mandrillon	1'06:48	18
50 km	Gervais Gindre	4'39:31	28
50 km	Benoît Carrara	3'55:16	11

Men's 4 × 10 km relay

Athletes	Race	
Athletes	Time	Rank
Gérard Perrier; Benoît Carrara; Jean Mermet; René Mandrillon	2'31:11	4

Women

Event	Athlete	Race	
Event	Athlete	Time	Rank
10 km	Michèle Angirany	54:56	18
10 km	Josette Baisse	51:43	15

== Figure skating ==
Men

Athlete	CF	FS	Points	Places	Rank
Alain Giletti	7	6	163.233	63	7

Women

Athlete	CF	FS	Points	Places	Rank
Jacqueline du Bief	4	2	158.000	24	3rd place, bronze medalist(s)

== Ski jumping ==
Athlete	Event	Jump 1			Jump 2			Total	
Athlete	Event	Distance	Points	Rank	Distance	Points	Rank	Points	Rank
Henri Thiolière	Large hill	56.5 (fall)	54.0	44	55.0	88.5	41	142.5	43
André Monnier	Large hill	56.0	90.0	37	56.0	92.5	33	182.5	36
Régis Robert Rey	Large hill	56.5	90.5	36	57.5	91.0	35	181.5	38
