= Norway at the 1956 Winter Olympics =

- IOC code: NOR
- NOC: Norwegian Sports Federation

in Cortina d'Ampezzo
- Competitors: 45 (37 men, 8 women) in 6 sports
- Flag bearer: Sverre Stenersen (Nordic combined)
- Medals Ranked 7th: Gold 2 Silver 1 Bronze 1 Total 4

Winter Olympics appearances (overview)
- 1924; 1928; 1932; 1936; 1948; 1952; 1956; 1960; 1964; 1968; 1972; 1976; 1980; 1984; 1988; 1992; 1994; 1998; 2002; 2006; 2010; 2014; 2018; 2022; 2026

Norway competed at the 1956 Winter Olympics in Cortina d'Ampezzo, Italy.

== Medalists ==
Medal	Name	Sport	Event
Gold	Hallgeir Brenden	Cross-country skiing	Men's 15 km
Gold	Sverre Stenersen	Nordic combined	Men's individual
Silver	Knut Johannesen	Speed skating	Men's 10,000m
Bronze	Alv Gjestvang	Speed skating	Men's 500m

== Alpine skiing ==
Men

Athlete	Event	Race 1		Race 2		Total	
Athlete	Event	Time	Rank	Time	Rank	Time	Rank
Trygve Berge	Downhill					DSQ	–
Kåre Opdal	Downhill					DSQ	–
Asle Sjåstad	Downhill					3:08.8	14
Jan Thorstensen	Giant Slalom					DSQ	–
Guttorm Berge	Giant Slalom					DSQ	–
Hans Magnus Andresen	Giant Slalom					3:44.7	50
Asle Sjåstad	Giant Slalom					3:21.6	22
Asle Sjåstad	Slalom	1:36.4	25	2:04.5	17	3:40.9	18
Hans Magnus Andresen	Slalom	1:35.0	21	2:06.8	21	3:41.8	20
Jan Thorstensen	Slalom	1:33.1	14	DSQ	–	DSQ	–
Guttorm Berge	Slalom	1:32.1	9	DSQ	–	DSQ	–

Women

Athlete	Event	Race 1		Race 2		Total	
Athlete	Event	Time	Rank	Time	Rank	Time	Rank
Astrid Sandvik	Downhill					1:54.4	27
Inger Jørgensen	Downhill					1:54.3	26
Borghild Niskin	Downhill					1:49.5	9
Inger Jørgensen	Giant Slalom					2:04.4	24
Astrid Sandvik	Giant Slalom					2:04.0	22
Inger Bjørnbakken	Giant Slalom					2:02.3	14
Borghild Niskin	Giant Slalom					1:59.0	7
Inger Jørgensen	Slalom	1:01.4	17	1:00.9	15	2:02.3	13
Borghild Niskin	Slalom	59.0	11	1:00.0	12	1:59.0	11
Astrid Sandvik	Slalom	58.9	10	59.1	5	1:58.0	6
Inger Bjørnbakken	Slalom	58.7	8	59.3	6	1:58.0	6

== Bobsleigh ==
Sled	Athletes	Event	Run 1		Run 2		Run 3		Run 4		Total	
Sled	Athletes	Event	Time	Rank	Time	Rank	Time	Rank	Time	Rank	Time	Rank
NOR-1	Reidar Alveberg; Arnold Dyrdahl	Two-man	1:29.04	22	1:26.83	17	DNF	–	1:28.86	19	DNF	–
NOR-2	Arne Røgden; Odd Solli	Two-man	1:27.57	20	1:26.90	19	1:28.81	21	1:29.05	21	5:52.33	20

Sled	Athletes	Event	Run 1		Run 2		Run 3		Run 4		Total	
Sled	Athletes	Event	Time	Rank	Time	Rank	Time	Rank	Time	Rank	Time	Rank
NOR-1	Arne Røgden; Arnold Dyrdahl; Odd Solli; Trygve Brudevold	Four-man	1:20.96	16	1:20.08	13	1:20.45	11	1:20.01	7	5:21.50	11

== Cross-country skiing ==
Men

Event	Athlete	Race	
Event	Athlete	Time	Rank
15 km	Magnar Ingebrigtsli	54:30	30
15 km	Martin Stokken	50:45	6
15 km	Håkon Brusveen	50:36	5
15 km	Hallgeir Brenden	49:39	1st place, gold medalist(s)
30 km	Per Olsen	1'51:15	19
30 km	Oddmund Jensen	1'51:04	17
30 km	Martin Stokken	1'49:38	15
30 km	Hallgeir Brenden	1'49:29	14
50 km	Martin Stokken	DSQ	–
50 km	Birger Vestermo	DSQ	–
50 km	Edvin Landsem	3'11:43	15
50 km	Oddmund Jensen	3'11:14	14

Men's 4 × 10 km relay

Athletes	Race	
Athletes	Time	Rank
Håkon Brusveen; Per Olsen; Martin Stokken; Hallgeir Brenden	2'21:16	4

Women

Event	Athlete	Race	
Event	Athlete	Time	Rank
10 km	Ingrid Wigernæs	43:40	27
10 km	Gina Regland	42:42	22
10 km	Rakel Wahl	40:49	11
10 km	Kjelfrid Brusveen	40:38	10

Women's 3 x 5 km relay

Athletes	Race	
Athletes	Time	Rank
Kjelfrid Brusveen; Gina Regland; Rakel Wahl	1'10:50	4

== Nordic combined ==
Events:

- normal hill ski jumping (Three jumps, best two counted and shown here.)
- 15 km cross-country skiing

Athlete	Event	Ski Jumping				Cross-country			Total	
Athlete	Event	Distance 1	Distance 2	Points	Rank	Time	Points	Rank	Points	Rank
Kjetil Mårdalen	Individual	64.0	67.0	189.0	26	57:43	234.500	6	423.500	14
Arne Barhaugen	Individual	64.5	68.0	199.0	15	57:11	236.581	3	435.581	5
Tormod Knutsen	Individual	70.5	69.0	203.0	10	58:22	232.000	9	435.000	6
Sverre Stenersen	Individual	73.0	74.0	215.0	2	56:18	240.000	1	455.000	1st place, gold medalist(s)

== Ski jumping ==
Athlete	Event	Jump 1			Jump 2			Total	
Athlete	Event	Distance	Points	Rank	Distance	Points	Rank	Points	Rank
Sverre Stenersen	Normal hill	72.0	90.5	39	70.0	93.0	29	183.5	35
Asbjørn Osnes	Normal hill	75.5	102.0	18	72.0	97.5	21	199.5	18
Sverre Stallvik	Normal hill	77.0	104.5	11	75.5	103.5	11	208.0	9
Arne Hoel	Normal hill	77.5	104.5	11	76.5	102.0	13	206.5	11

== Speed skating ==
Men

Event	Athlete	Race	
Event	Athlete	Time	Rank
500 m	Hroar Elvenes	42.8	17
500 m	Sigmund Søfteland	42.7	16
500 m	Finn Hodt	42.5	13
500 m	Alv Gjestvang	41.0	3rd place, bronze medalist(s)
1500 m	Hroar Elvenes	2:16.0	24
1500 m	Jan Kristiansen	2:13.7	16
1500 m	Roald Aas	2:12.9	10
1500 m	Knut Johannesen	2:12.2	9
5000 m	Hjalmar Andersen	8:06.5	11
5000 m	Torstein Seiersten	8:06.4	10
5000 m	Knut Johannesen	8:02.3	8
5000 m	Roald Aas	8:01.6	6
10,000 m	Knut Tangen	17:22.3	19
10,000 m	Hjalmar Andersen	16:52.6	6
10,000 m	Sverre Haugli	16:48.7	4
10,000 m	Knut Johannesen	16:36.9	2nd place, silver medalist(s)
