= Deaths in December 2001 =

The following is a list of notable deaths in December 2001.

Entries for each day are listed alphabetically by surname. A typical entry lists information in the following sequence:

- Name, age, country of citizenship at birth, subsequent country of citizenship (if applicable), reason for notability, cause of death (if known), and reference.

== December 2001 ==
=== 1 ===
- Doug Bartlett, 87, Australian rugby league footballer.
- Barry Donath, 68, Australian Olympic shot putter (1956).
- Danilo Donati, 75, Italian costume designer (Romeo and Juliet, Fellini's Casanova) and production designer (Life Is Beautiful), Oscar winner (1969, 1977).
- Ellis R. Dungan, 92, American film director.
- Michael Gallanagh, 82, Irish Fianna Fáil politician and Army captain.
- Cor de Jager, 76, Dutch army officer, Chief of Defence (1980–1983).
- Lin Haiyin, 83, Taiwanese writer, organ dysfunction.
- Celia M. Hunter, 82, American environmentalist and conservationist.
- Chris Rees, 70, Welsh politician.
- Pavel Sadyrin, 59, Soviet and Russian football player and manager, cancer.

=== 2 ===
- John W. Collins, 89, American chess master, author and teacher.
- Chase Craig, 91, American comic strip and comic book writer and cartoonist, fall.
- Bruce Halford, 70, British racing driver.
- Martha Kneale, 92, British philosopher.
- Roger McDonough, 92, American librarian.
- Amir Abdullah Khan Rokhri, 85, Pakistani politician.
- Max Rood, 74, Dutch jurist and politician.
- Naomi Schor, 58, American literary critic and theorist, brain hemorrhage.
- Manuel Velasco Suárez, 86, Mexican neurologist, scientist and humanist, Governor of Chiapas (1970−1976).
- Dmitri Voskoboynikov, 60, Soviet Russian Olympic volleyball player (1964).
- Willie Woodburn, 82, Scottish footballer.

=== 3 ===
- Juan José Arreola, 83, Mexican writer, academic, and actor.
- Dee Barton, 64, American jazz trombonist, big band drummer and composer.
- Marike de Klerk, 64, First Lady of South Africa, as wife of President Frederik Willem de Klerk, murdered.
- Anthony Gigliotti, 79, American clarinetist and music teacher (Philadelphia Orchestra).
- Nebojša M. Krstić, 37, Serbian theologian and sociologist, car accident.
- Grady Martin, 72, American country music guitarist (The Nashville A-Team), heart attack.
- Gerhart M Riegner, 90, German philosopher, and the secretary-general of the World Jewish Congress from 1965 to 1983.
- Harry Winter, 87, Austrian singer.

=== 4 ===
- Silvio Clementelli, 75, Italian film producer.
- Pierre de Bénouville, 87, French Army officer, member of the Resistance during World War II, and politician.
- Mercedes Matter, 87/88, American painter, draughtswoman, and writer.
- Eddie Popowski, 88, American baseball coach and manager.
- Princess Maria Francesca of Savoy, 86, Italian royal and daughter of Victor Emmanuel III of Italy.
- John Townsend, 85, American basketball player.
- Ed Whalen, 74, Canadian television personality and journalist, heart attack.

=== 5 ===
- Zhang Banglun, 82, Chinese Olympic footballer (1948).
- Anton Benya, 89, Austrian politician and trade unionist.
- Peter Blake, 53, New Zealand sailor and environmentalist, shot.
- Muhamed Kreševljaković, 62, Bosnian politician and Mayor of Sarajevo.
- Moya Lear, 86, American businesswoman and philanthropist.
- Franco Rasetti, 100, Italian-American physicist.
- Bill Roberts, 89, British athlete and Olympian (1936, 1948).
- Dharam Singh, 82, Indian field hockey player and Olympic champion (1952).
- Valo Urho, 85, Finnish Olympic sailor (1948).
- Tomás Vio, 80, Argentine Olympic basketball player (1948).

=== 6 ===
- Colin Buchanan, 94, Scottish town planner.
- Robert W. Camac, 61, American thoroughbred horse racing trainer and breeder, shot.
- Thomas William Gould, 86, English Royal Navy submariner and World War II hero (Victoria Cross).
- Clarita Hunsberger, 95, American Olympic diver (1928).
- Lia Leismüller, 70, German Olympic alpine skier (1952).
- Charles McClendon, 78, American football player (University of Kentucky) and coach (Louisiana State University).
- Walt Mulconery, 69, American film editor (Flashdance, The Karate Kid, Touch and Go).

=== 7 ===
- David Astor, 89, British newspaper proprietor.
- Eva Calvo, 80, Mexican actress.
- Wally Cruice, 88, American NFL football player, assistant coach, and scout.
- James Crutchfield, 89, American blues singer, piano player and songwriter, heart disease.
- Peter Elias, 78, American information theorist, Creutzfeldt–Jakob disease.
- Faith Hubley, 77, American animator (Moonbird, The Hole, Sesame Street, A Doonesbury Special), breast cancer.
- Billie Matthews, 71, American gridiron football coach.
- Subrata Mitra, 70, Indian cinematographer.
- Pauline Moore, 87, American actress (Heidi, The Three Musketeers, Young Mr. Lincoln, Charlie Chan at Treasure Island), ALS.
- Ray Powell, 73, British politician.

=== 8 ===
- Agha Shahid Ali, 52, Kashmiri-American poet, brain cancer.
- Wink Bowman, 85, American basketball player.
- Mirza Delibašić, 47, Bosnian and Yugoslav basketball player, coach, and Olympian (1976, 1980).
- Maurice Gross, 67, French linguist and scholar.
- Betty Holberton, 84, American computer programmer, one of six original programmers of the ENIAC computer.
- Pete Perreault, 62, American gridiron football player (New York Jets, Cincinnati Bengals, Minnesota Vikings).
- Sergei Suponev, 38, Soviet/Russian television director and children's television presenter, snowmobile accident.
- Miroslav Vlach, 66, Czech ice hockey player and Olympic medalist (1960, 1964).
- George Young, 71, American football executive.

=== 9 ===
- Cesina Bermudes, 93, Portuguese obstetrician and feminist.
- Michael Carver, Baron Carver, 86, British Field Marshal.
- Gijs Kramer, 96, Dutch painter.
- Carol Lindroos, 71, Finnish Olympic discus thrower (1960).
- Joseph Mees, 78, Belgian prelate of the Catholic Church.
- Frederick Stewart, 85, British geologist.
- Lisa Welander, 92, Swedish neurologist.

=== 10 ===
- Enrique Araneda, 94, Chilean footballer.
- Mikhail Budyko, 81, Russian climatologist.
- Gus Doerner, 79, American basketball player.
- Alan Fennell, 65, British writer and editor.
- Knut Fægri, 92, Norwegian botanist and palaeoecologist.
- Sadao Kikuchi, 68, Japanese Olympic ski jumper (1960, 1964).
- Ashok Kumar, 90, Indian film actor, heart failure.
- Vernon Richards, 86, Anglo-Italian anarchist, author, and photographer.
- Heinz Rögner, 72, German conductor.

=== 11 ===
- Beverly Hope Atkinson, 66, American actress, cancer.
- Andrei Bantikov, 87, Russian and Soviet painter.
- Graham Billing, 65, New Zealand novelist, journalist and poet.
- Mainza Chona, 71, Zambian politician and diplomat, kidney failure.
- Ramchandra Narayan Dandekar, 92, Indian indologist and scholar.
- Zdeněk Dítě, 81, Czechoslovak film actor.
- Thomas Favors, 80, American baseball player.
- Teguh Karya, 64, Indonesian film director, complications from a stroke.
- Clark Mills, 86, American boatbuilder and designer.
- John Wilkinson Taylor, 95, American academic and UNESCO director-general.
- Tatsuo Watanabe, 73, Japanese Olympic ski jumper (1952).

=== 12 ===
- Friedel Apelt, 99, German political activist and trades union official.
- Josef Bican, 88, Austrian-Czech footballer.
- Ardito Desio, 104, Italian explorer, geologist, and cartographer.
- Berit Granquist, 92, Swedish Olympic fencer (1936).
- Armando Theodoro Hunziker, 82, Argentine botanist (Botanical Museum of the National University of Córdoba), cancer.
- Farnham Johnson, 77, American gridiron football player (Chicago Rockets).
- Lê Phổ, 94, Vietnamese painter.
- Giuseppe Prisco, 80, Italian lawyer and sporting director.
- Jean Richard, 80, French actor, comedian, and circus entrepreneur, cancer.
- Roger Scotti, 76, French football player.
- U. S. Grant Sharp Jr., 95, United States Navy admiral.
- William Stobie, 51, Northern Irish paramilitary, shot.

=== 13 ===
- Michael Bradshaw, 68, English actor.
- Larry Costello, 70, American basketball player (Philadelphia Warriors, Syracuse Nationals/Philadelphia 76ers), and coach (Milwaukee Bucks), cancer.
- Yvan Craipeau, 90, French Trotskyist.
- Jack Hoffman, 71, American gridiron football player (Xavier University, Chicago Bears).
- György Kőszegi, 51, Hungarian weightlifter and Olympic silver medalist (1976, 1980).
- Karel Lomecký, 87, Czech canoeist and Olympian (1948).
- Nigel Lovell, 85, Australian actor and opera director.
- Beatrice Macola, 36, Italian actress, cerebral infarction.
- Vidadi Narimanbekov, 75, Azerbaijani painter.
- Chuck Schuldiner, 34, American death metal guitarist, vocalist and songwriter, brain cancer.
- Dušan Slobodník, 74, Slovak literary theoretician, translator and politician.
- Juha Tikka, 71, Finnish Olympic swimmer (1952).

=== 14 ===
- Conte Candoli, 74, American jazz trumpeter, prostate cancer.
- Arghiri Emmanuel, 90, French marxian economist.
- Alfred Byrd Graf, 100, German-American botanist, photographer and author.
- John Guedel, 88, American radio and television producer (You Bet Your Life, People Are Funny, The Adventures of Ozzie and Harriet).
- Pauline Mills McGibbon, 91, Canadian politician, Lieutenant Governor of Ontario.
- Claude Santelli, 78, French film director and screenwriter.
- W. G. Sebald, 57, German writer, car collision.
- Eoin Ryan, Snr, 81, Irish politician, senator (1957–1987).
- André Tollet, 88, French chairman of the Paris liberation committee.
- Jack Tomson, 83, British-born Canadian ice hockey player (New York Americans).

=== 15 ===
- Wilkie Cooper, 90, British cinematographer (Jason and the Argonauts).
- Russ Haas, 27, American professional wrestler, heart failure.
- Bianca Halstead, 36, American hard rock singer, traffic collision.
- Franciszek Kępka, 61, Polish glider pilot and European champion.
- José O'Callaghan Martínez, 79, Spanish Jesuit priest and biblical scholar.
- Rufus Thomas, 84, American R&B/soul singer, heart failure.

=== 16 ===
- Stuart Adamson, 43, Scottish singer-songwriter and guitarist of Big Country and The Raphaels, suicide by hanging.
- Roy Brocksmith, 56, American actor, diabetes.
- Stefan Heym, 88, German writer, heart failure.
- Martin Isaksson, 80, Finnish politician and diplomat.
- Carwood Lipton, 81, American soldier during World War II and member of the Band of Brothers.
- Lester Persky, 76, American film, television, and theatre producer, complications following heart surgery.
- Villy Sørensen, 72, Danish writer, philosopher and literary critic.
- Lincoln Tate, 67, American actor and marine.
- Gheorghe Vilmoș, 60, Romanian Olympic biathlete (1964, 1968, 1972).

=== 17 ===
- Mohammad al-Husayni al-Shirazi, 73, Iranian-Iraqi Shia marja' and political theorist.
- Gerald Ashby, 52, English football referee, heart attack.
- Vittoria Avanzini, 86, Italian Olympic gymnast (1936).
- Luigi Bertoldi, 81, Italian socialist politician.
- Fred Chaney Sr., 87, Australian politician.
- Nelson Chelle, 70, Uruguayan Olympic basketball player (1956, 1960).
- Frédéric de Pasquale, 70, French actor.
- Martin Glaberman, 83, American marxist writer, historian, and academic.
- Eynon Hawkins, 81, Welsh rugby footballer.
- Vladimir Kazantsev, 48, Russian Airborne Forces major general, fall.
- Yolande Le Calvez, 91, French geologist, palaeontologist, geological engineer.
- Martha Mödl, 89, German soprano, and later mezzo-soprano.
- Wale Ogunyemi, 62, Nigerian dramatist, film actor, and playwright.
- Aleksandr Volodin, 82, Soviet and Russian playwright, screenwriter and poet.
- Alf Wood, 86, English football goalkeeper and manager.

=== 18 ===
- Gilbert Bécaud, 74, French singer, composer ("What Now My Love"), pianist and actor, lung cancer.
- Dan DeCarlo, 82, American cartoonist (Sabrina the Teenage Witch, Josie and the Pussycats, Cheryl Blossom), pneumonia.
- Dimitris Dragatakis, 87, Greek classical music composer.
- Mary Hardwick, 88, English tennis player.
- Bill Howerton, 80, American baseball player (St. Louis Cardinals, Pittsburgh Pirates, New York Giants).
- Kira Ivanova, 38, Soviet Olympic figure skater (1980, 1984, 1988), homicide.
- Jim Letherer, 67, American civil rights activist.
- Marcel Mule, 100, French saxophonist.
- Tolomush Okeyev, 66, Kyrgyz screenwriter and film director.
- Amal Kumar Sarkar, 100, Indian judge and Chief Justice.
- Fyodor Shutkov, 77, Soviet Russian Olympic sailor (1952, 1956, 1960, 1964, 1968).
- Marcelle Tassencourt, 87, French actress and theatre director.
- Cecil Waidyaratne, 63, Sri Lankan general.
- Clifford T. Ward, 57, English singer-songwriter, pneumonia.

=== 19 ===
- Susheela Gopalan, 71, Indian communist leader and politician.
- Christine Kittrell, 72, American R&B singer, emphysema.
- Wang Ruowang, 83, Chinese author and dissident, lung cancer.
- Julia Sánchez, 71, Peruvian track and field sprinter.
- Hans Warren, 80, Dutch writer, liver problems.
- Dale Waters, 92, American football player (Cleveland Indians, Portsmouth Spartans, Boston Braves/Redskins).
- Jakob Weidemann, 78, Norwegian artist.
- Arkie Whiteley, 37, Australian actress (A Town Like Alice, Mad Max 2, Princess Caraboo), adrenal cancer.
- Kiyoji Ōtsuji, 78, Japanese photographer, photography theorist, and educator.

=== 20 ===
- Manuhuia Bennett, 85, New Zealand anglican prelate.
- Foster Brooks, 89, American actor and comedian, heart failure.
- Edward Evans, 87, English film and television actor (The Grove Family, Coronation Street, Z-Cars).
- Sergey Gorbunov, 31, Russian volleyball player and Olympian (1992).
- Kōji Nanbara, 74, Japanese actor, heart attack.
- Kauko Paananen, 77, Finnish Olympic equestrian (1956).
- Léopold Sédar Senghor, 95, Senegalese politician and poet, President (1960 -1980).
- Joan Wheeler, 88, American actress.

=== 21 ===
- James M. Burns, 77, American attorney and district judge (United States District Court for the District of Oregon).
- Joe Levandoski, 80, Canadian ice hockey player (New York Rangers).
- Heinz Macher, 81, German Waffen-SS member and Nazi official during World War II.
- Kevin Manser, 72, Australian actor, cancer.
- Jacques Mauclair, 82, French film actor.
- Ed Salem, 73, American gridiron football player (Washington Redskins), complications from diabetes.
- Dick Schaap, 67, American sportswriter, broadcaster, and author.
- Thomas Sebeok, 81, Hungarian-American polymath, semiotician, and linguist.
- Leonid Smirnov, 85, Soviet statesman.
- Karl Winsch, 86, American baseball player and manager.
- Namık Kemal Yolga, 87, Turkish diplomat and statesman.
- Vladimir Zherikhin, 56, Soviet/Russian paleoentomologist and coleopterist.

=== 22 ===
- Grzegorz Ciechowski, 44, Polish rock musician (Republika) and film music composer, heart attack after surgery.
- Bob Davis, 68, American baseball player (Kansas City Athletics).
- Angèle Durand, 76, Belgian singer and actress.
- Lance Fuller, 73, American actor.
- Jovan Gojković, 26, Serbian football player, traffic collision.
- Shidzue Katō, 104, Japanese feminist and politician.
- Jan Kott, 87, Polish theatre critic and political activist, heart attack.
- Norm Larson, 81, Canadian ice hockey player (New York/Brooklyn Americans, New York Rangers).
- Lance Loud, 50, American television personality and magazine columnist, liver failure as a result of hepatitis C.
- Jacques Mayol, 74, French diver and holder of many records in free diving, suicide by hanging.
- Gene Taylor, 72, American jazz double bassist.
- Liu Zihou, 92, Chinese politician, governor of Hubei and Hebei.

=== 23 ===
- Torbjørn Clausen, 70, Norwegian Olympic boxer (1952).
- Mark Clinton, 86, Irish Fine Gael politician.
- Vicente Gómez, 90, Spanish guitarist and composer.
- Elkana Grønne, 76, Danish Olympic gymanst (1948).
- Bola Ige, 71, Nigerian lawyer and politician (Minister of Justice and Attorney General of Nigeria), shot.
- Dimitri Obolensky, 83, Russian-born British historian.
- Pedro Richards, 45, English footballer, pneumonia.
- Donald C. Spencer, 89, American mathematician.
- Jelle Zijlstra, 83, Dutch politician and economist, Prime Minister (1966–1967), dementia.

=== 24 ===
- Doug Adam, 78, Canadian ice hockey player (New York Rangers), and coach.
- René Alpsteg, 81, French footballer.
- Hiroshi Kuroki, 94, Japanese politician and governor of Miyazaki Prefecture, pneumonia.
- Robert Leckie, 81, United States Marine and author, Alzheimer's disease.
- Harvey Martin, 51, American gridiron football player (Dallas Cowboys), pancreatic cancer.
- Lucie Petit-Diagre, 100, Belgian Olympic discus thrower (1928).
- Hank Soar, 87, American gridiron football player (New York Giants).
- Gareth Williams, 48, British musician (This Heat), cancer.

=== 25 ===
- Mike Davis, 45, American professional wrestler, heart attack.
- Bryan Drake, 76, New Zealand operatic baritone.
- Andrew J. Evans Jr., 83, American air force officer and flying ace.
- Ramón García, 77, Cuban baseball player (Washington Senators).
- Alfred Tomatis, 81, French otolaryngologist and inventor.
- Billy Wells, 70, American football player.

=== 26 ===
- Jacques Cauvin, French archaeologist.
- Edward Downes, 90, American musicologist, radio personality, and music critic.
- Sir Nigel Hawthorne, 72, British actor (The Madness of King George, Yes Minister, Tarzan), five-time BAFTA winner, pancreatic cancer, heart attack.
- Paul Landres, 89, American film and television editor and director, cancer.
- Tom McBride, 87, American baseball player (Boston Red Sox, Washington Senators).
- George Rochester, 93, British physicist, heart failure.

=== 27 ===
- Momčilo Cemović, 73, Montenegrin politician.
- Peter Cooke, 77, Kenyan Olympic sailor (1964).
- Pete D'Alonzo, 72, American gridiron football player (Detroit Lions).
- Robert Fowler, 70, South African Olympic cyclist (1952, 1956, 1960).
- Ian Hamilton, 63, British critic, poet, magazine publisher, cancer.
- John Hoffman, 58, American baseball player (Houston Colt .45s/Astros).
- Paul Hogarth, 84, British artist.
- Zoltan Norman, 82, Romanian Olympic water polo player (1952).
- Boris Rybakov, 83, Russian historian.
- Helen Rodríguez Trías, 72, American pediatrician and women's rights activist, cancer.

=== 28 ===
- Tadeusz Adamski, 79, Polish Olympic field hockey player (1952).
- Charles Aiu, 47, American football player (San Diego Chargers, Seattle Seahawks).
- Frankie Gaye, 60, American soul musician and brother of Marvin Gaye, heart attack.
- T. R. Govindachari, 86, Indian chemist and academic.
- Hovie Lister, 75, American gospel singer and manager of The Statesmen Quartet.
- Arne Rettedal, 75, Norwegian politician.
- Anthony Royle, Baron Fanshawe of Richmond, 74, British politician and businessman.
- Sam Solon, 70, American politician, melanoma.
- Gerard van Leijenhorst, 73, Dutch politician and chemist.

=== 29 ===
- Don Boll, 74, American football player (Washington Redskins, New York Giants).
- Tom Bourke, 83, Australian rugby player.
- Cássia Eller, 39, Brazilian singer and musician, heart attack.
- Florian Fricke, 57, German musician, stroke.
- György Kepes, 95, Hungarian-American painter, photographer, designer, and art theorist.
- Anatoly Kubatsky, 93, Soviet/Russian actor.
- Clinton D. McKinnon, 95, American politician and journalist, member of the United States House of Representatives (1949–1953).
- Josef Věntus, 70, Czech rower and Olympic medalist (1956, 1960, 1964).
- Louis Waltniel, 76, Belgian politician and industrialist.

=== 30 ===
- Eric Cheney, 77, British motorcycle designer.
- Chaim Kreiswirth, 83, Belgian orthodox rabbi.
- Samuel Mockbee, 57, American architect, leukemia.
- Ray Patterson, 90, American animator (The Smurfs, Dumbo, Challenge of the GoBots).
- Sheila Sherlock, 83, British physician, pulmonary fibrosis.
- Ralph Sutton, 79, American jazz pianist, stroke.
- Vladislav Čáp, 75, Czech figure skater and Olympian (1948).

=== 31 ===
- Mathew H. Ahmann, 70, American Catholic layman and civil rights activist, cancer.
- John Grigg, 2nd Baron Altrincham, 77, British writer, historian and politician.
- Guido di Tella, 70, Argentine businessman, academic and diplomat, cerebral hemorrhage.
- Eileen Heckart, 82, American actress (Butterflies Are Free, The Bad Seed, The First Wives Club), Oscar winner (1973), lung cancer.
- Harshad Mehta, 47, Indian stockbroker and fraudster.
- Bernie Purcell, 73, Australian rugby player and coach.
- T. M. Chidambara Ragunathan, 78, Tamil, writer, journalist and literary critic.
- David Swift, 82, American screenwriter and film director (How to Succeed in Business Without Really Trying, The Parent Trap, Pollyanna), heart failure.
