= Yugoslavia at the 1956 Winter Olympics =

- Flag of FPR Yugoslavia
- IOC code: YUG (JUG used at these Games)
- NOC: Yugoslav Olympic Committee

in Cortina d'Ampezzo
- Competitors: 17 (12 men, 5 women) in 3 sports
- Medals: Gold 0 Silver 0 Bronze 0 Total 0

Winter Olympics appearances (overview)
- 1924; 1928; 1932; 1936; 1948; 1952; 1956; 1960; 1964; 1968; 1972; 1976; 1980; 1984; 1988; 1992; 1994; 1998; 2002

Other related appearances
- Croatia (1992–pres.); Slovenia (1992–pres.); Bosnia and Herzegovina (1994–pres.); North Macedonia (1998–pres.); Serbia and Montenegro (1998–2006); Montenegro (2010–pres.); Serbia (2010–pres.); Kosovo (2018–pres.)

Athletes from the Federal People's Republic of Yugoslavia competed at the 1956 Winter Olympics in Cortina d'Ampezzo, Italy.

== Alpine skiing ==
Men

Athlete	Event	Race 1		Race 2		Total	
Athlete	Event	Time	Rank	Time	Rank	Time	Rank
Jože Ilija	Downhill					DSQ	–
Ludvig Dornig	Downhill					3:41.1	29
Frank Cvenkelj	Downhill					3:28.5	22
Jože Ilija	Giant Slalom					3:44.8	51
Ludvig Dornig	Giant Slalom					3:42.4	47
Franc Cvenkelj	Giant Slalom					3:33.7	40
Jože Ilija	Slalom	2:17.5	52	2:22.3	33	4:39.8	43
Franc Cvenkelj	Slalom	1:58.3	42	2:28.6	40	4:26.9	42
Ludvig Dornig	Slalom	1:49.3	35	2:13.4	25	4:02.7	28

Women

Athlete	Event	Race 1		Race 2		Total	
Athlete	Event	Time	Rank	Time	Rank	Time	Rank
Slava Zupančič	Downhill					1:54.5	28
Slava Zupančič	Giant Slalom					2:07.9	32
Slava Zupančič	Slalom	1:35.0	36	1:08.5	23	2:43.5	32

== Cross-country skiing ==
Men

Event	Athlete	Race	
Event	Athlete	Time	Rank
15 km	Matevž Kordež	57:09	49
15 km	Cveto Pavčič	56:55	47
15 km	Janez Pavčič	56:41	45
15 km	Zdravko Hlebanja	56:32	43
30 km	Janez Pavčič	DSQ	–
30 km	Štefan Robač	2'03:55	45
30 km	Zdravko Hlebanja	2'01:47	42
30 km	Matevž Kordež	1'57:48	32
50 km	Štefan Robač	DSQ	–

Men's 4 × 10 km relay

Athletes	Race	
Athletes	Time	Rank
Zdravko Hlebanja; Cveto Pavčič; Matevž Kordež; Janez Pavčič	2'33:45	13

Women

Event	Athlete	Race	
Event	Athlete	Time	Rank
10 km	Biserka Vodenlič	46:28	36
10 km	Nada Birko-Kustec	46:03	35
10 km	Mara Rekar	45:36	33
10 km	Amalija Belaj	45:32	32

Women's 3 x 5 km relay

Athletes	Race	
Athletes	Time	Rank
Amalija Belaj; Biserka Vodenlič; Nada Birko-Kustec	1'18:54	9

== Ski jumping ==
Athlete	Event	Jump 1			Jump 2			Total	
Athlete	Event	Distance	Points	Rank	Distance	Points	Rank	Points	Rank
Janez Gorišek	Normal hill	63.5	81.5	50	63.5	80.5	47	162.0	50
Albin Rogelj	Normal hill	71.0	94.0	31	74.5	98.5	18	192.5	23
Janez Polda	Normal hill	74.5	96.5	27	74.0	95.0	24	191.5	24
Jože Zidar	Normal hill	75.0	99.5	23	74.0	94.5	25	194.0	22
