= Alpine skiing at the 1952 Winter Olympics – Women's downhill =

Women's downhill at the VI Olympic Winter Games
- Alpine skiing
- Venue: Norefjell Ski Resort, Krødsherad, Norway
- Date: 17 February 1952
- Competitors: 42 from 13 nations
- Winning time: 1:47.1

Medalists
1st place, gold medalist(s)		Trude Jochum-Beiser	Austria
2nd place, silver medalist(s)		Annemarie Buchner	Germany
3rd place, bronze medalist(s)		Giuliana Minuzzo	Italy

Women's Downhill
- Interactive map of Women's Downhill
- Location: Norefjell
- Vertical: 385 m (1,263 ft)
- Top elevation: 710 m (2,329 ft) AMSL
- Base elevation: 325 m (1,066 ft)

The women's downhill event was part of the alpine skiing at the 1952 Winter Olympics program, and was the second appearance of the event. The competition was held at Norefjell Ski Resort near Krødsherad, Norway, on Sunday, 17 February. Forty-two alpine skiers from 13 nations competed.

Austria's Trude Jochum-Beiser won the gold medal, Annemarie Buchner of Germany took the silver, and Giuliana Minuzzo of Italy was the bronze medalist.

The race's starting elevation was 710 m (2,329 ft) above sea level; the course length was 1.35 km (0.84 mi), with a vertical drop of 385 m (1,263 ft). Jochum-Beiser's winning time of 107.1 seconds yielded an average speed of 45.378 km/h (28.2 mph), with an average vertical descent rate of 3.595 m/s (11.8 ft/s).

== Results ==
Sunday, 17 February 1952

The race was started at 13:00 local time, (UTC +1).

Rank	Bib #	Competitor	Time	Difference
1st place, gold medalist(s)	3	Trude Jochum-Beiser (AUT)	1:47.1	—
2nd place, silver medalist(s)	5	Annemarie Buchner (GER)	1:48.0	+0.9
3rd place, bronze medalist(s)	13	Giuliana Minuzzo (ITA)	1:49.0	+1.9
4	2	Erika Mahringer (AUT)	1:49.5	+2.4
5	8	Dagmar Rom (AUT)	1:49.8	+2.7
6	7	Madeleine Berthod (SUI)	1:50.7	+3.6
7	24	Margit Hvammen (NOR)	1:50.9	+3.8
8	34	Joanne Hewson (CAN)	1:51.3	+4.2
9	30	Evi Lanig (GER)	1:53.0	+5.9
10	18	Ida Schöpfer (SUI)	1:53.0	+5.9
10	19	Hannelore Franke (GER)	1:53.8	+6.7
12	14	Idly Walpoth (SUI)	1:54.1	+7.0
13	27	Barbara Grocholska (POL)	1:54.6	+7.5
14	33	Rosemarie Schutz (CAN)	1:54.9	+7.8
15	6	Celina Seghi (ITA)	1:54.9	+7.8
15	23	Silvia Glatthard (SUI)	1:54.9	+7.8
17	4	Andrea Mead Lawrence (USA)	1:55.3	+8.2
18	28	Sarah Thomasson (SWE)	1:55.5	+8.4
19	21	Betty Weir (USA)	1:55.7	+8.6
20	12	Rhoda Wurtele-Eaves (CAN)	1:56.4	+9.3
21	38	Dagny Jørgensen (NOR)	1:56.5	+9.4
22	29	Marysette Agnel (FRA)	1:56.8	+9.7
23	15	Katy Rodolph (USA)	1:57.4	+10.3
24	16	Trude Klecker (AUT)	1:57.9	+10.8
25	25	Margareta Jacobsson (SWE)	1:58.2	+11.1
26	41	Sheena Mackintosh (GBR)	1:59.6	+12.5
27	35	Lucille Wheeler (CAN)	1:59.7	+12.6
28	31	Ana María Dellai (ARG)	2:00.3	+13.2
29	40	Ingrid Englund (SWE)	2:01.3	+14.2
30	1	Andrée Bermond (FRA)	2:03.1	+16.0
31	26	Karen-Sofie Styrmoe (NOR)	2:15.5	+28.4
32	43	Ildikó Szendrődi-Kővári (HUN)	2:18.5	+31.4
33	42	Fiona Campbell (GBR)	2:18.6	+31.5
34	37	Maria Kowalska (POL)	2:27.4	+40.3
35	11	Lia Leismüller (GER)	2:37.6	+50.5
—	9	Jacqueline Martel (FRA)	DSQ	
—	10	Borghild Niskin (NOR)	DSQ	
—	17	Jannette Burr (USA)	DSQ	
—	22	Maria Grazia Marchelli (ITA)	DSQ	
—	36	Hilary Laing (GBR)	DSQ	
—	44	Teresa Kodelska (POL)	DSQ	
—	45	Vora Mackintosh (GBR)	DSQ	
