= Cross-country skiing at the 1952 Winter Olympics – Women's 10 kilometre =

Women's 10 kilometres at the VI Olympic Winter Games
- Venue: Holmenkollen
- Date: 23 February 1952
- Competitors: 20 from 8 nations
- Winning time: 41:40

Medalists
1st place, gold medalist(s)		Lydia Wideman	Finland
2nd place, silver medalist(s)		Mirja Hietamies	Finland
3rd place, bronze medalist(s)		Siiri Rantanen	Finland

The women's 10 kilometre cross-country skiing event was part of the cross-country skiing programme at the 1952 Winter Olympics. It was the first appearance of a women's cross-country skiing event at the Olympics. The competition was held on Saturday, 23 February 1952. Twenty cross-country skiers from eight nations competed.

== Medalists ==
Gold	Silver	Bronze
Lydia Wideman; Finland	Mirja Hietamies; Finland	Siiri Rantanen; Finland

== Results ==
Rank	Athlete	Time	
Rank	Athlete	At 5.5 km	Final
1	Lydia Wideman (FIN)	23:00	41:40
2	Mirja Hietamies (FIN)	24:00	42:39
3	Siiri Rantanen (FIN)	24:15	42:50
4	Märta Norberg (SWE)	24:10	42:53
5	Sirkka Polkunen (FIN)	24:10	43:07
6	Rakel Wahl (NOR)	25:20	44:54
7	Marit Øiseth (NOR)	25:40	45:04
8	Margit Albrechtsson (SWE)	25:05	45:05
9	Eivor Alm (SWE)	25:30	45:20
10	Gina Sigstad (NOR)	25:35	45:37
11	Sonja Edström (SWE)	25:45	45:41
12	Jorun Askersrud (NOR)	26:50	47:45
13	Hanni Gehring (GER)	28:10	50:39
14	Nada Birko (YUG)	28:30	50:44
15	Josette Baisse (FRA)	28:45	51:43
16	Angela Kordež (YUG)	28:55	52:33
17	Fides Romanin (ITA)	31:00	54:43
18	Michèle Angirany (FRA)	30:30	54:56
-	Ildegarda Taffra (ITA)	DNF	-
-	Lizzy Kladensky (AUT)	DNF	-
