= Françoise Gignoux =

French alpine skier and racing driver

- Françoise Matussière in Zakopane in 1939

Personal information
- Nickname: Matutu
- Born: Françoise Marie Henriette Thérèse Matussière; 22 February 1923 Grenoble, France
- Died: 24 October 1996 (aged 73) 15th arrondissement of Paris, France
- Years active: 1937–1948 (alpine skiing)

Sport
- Sport: Alpine skiing
- Club: Ski Club de Paris

Françoise Gignoux (née Matussière; 22 February 1923 – 24 October 1996) was a French alpine skier and racing driver. She was born in Grenoble and died in the 15th arrondissement of Paris.

In the late 1930s, Françoise Matussière emerged as a precocious talent in alpine skiing. At just fifteen, she competed at the 1939 World Championships, finishing fourth in the downhill. Regarded as a rising star of French skiing, she was the first French woman at this level whose background brought her into close contact with the mountains, at a time when women's skiing was largely the preserve of young Parisian women. The Second World War, however, interrupted international competition. After the war, now known as Françoise Gignoux following her marriage in 1941, she became one of the leaders of the French women's national team and competed at the 1948 Winter Olympics in St. Moritz, where she was one of France's leading competitors, finishing fifth in the combined.

Retiring from competitive alpine skiing after those Olympic Games, she continued her sporting career in motor racing alongside her husband, Marc Gignoux, and won the second edition of the Tour de France Automobile in 1952.

== Personal life ==
Françoise Matussière was born on 22 February 1923 in Grenoble. She was the daughter of Pierre Matussière and Paule Favre-Gilly, and a descendant of Amable Matussière (1829–1901), a papermaker from Domène. In 1941, she married Marc Gignoux, an industrialist and racing driver and the brother of Paul Gignoux, president of the French Ski Federation from 1945 to 1948. They had two daughters. Her brother, Louis Matussière, competed in the French skiing championships during the 1940s.

== Career ==
=== Alpine skiing career ===
==== Early skiing career ====
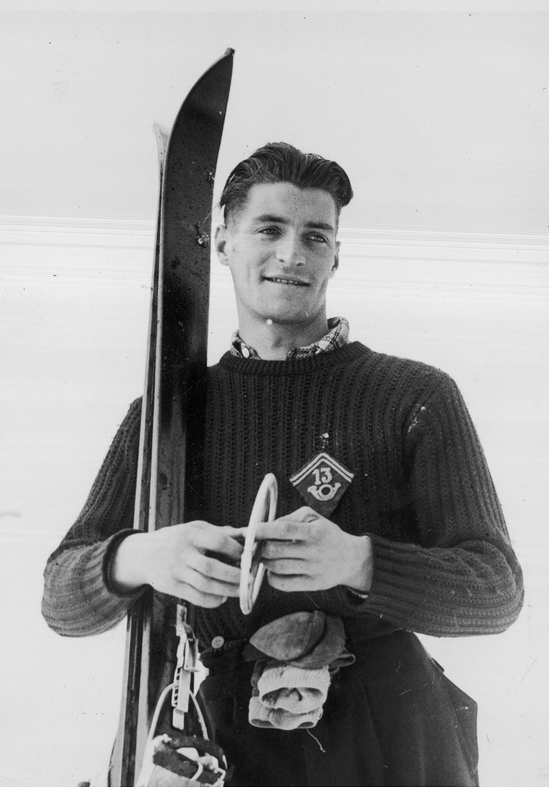
Maurice Lafforgue taught Matussière the French skiing technique.

A city-dweller from Grenoble, Françoise Matussière was soon regarded as the most precocious of France's female skiers in the late 1930s. She skied near the Bonnenuit chalet above Modane, where she spent her winters during her chilhood. She joined the Ski Club de Paris in October 1937 and took part in her first competitions during the winter of 1937–1938, aged only fourteen. At the Easter Grand Prix, a downhill race held in Chamonix by the Ski Club de Paris in April 1938, she came fifth out of about fifty competitors, behind skiers including Nicole Villan and Christiane de la Fressange. She was the only member of the French women's team described as a mountain girl, surrounded by Parisian competitors. Dr Deschamps, a delegate of the Dauphiné branch of the French Ski Federation (FFS), argued that she was not a mountain girl in the strict sense, since she came from a Grenoble family of industrialists and lawyers. Indeed, she had first been taught to ski by her father Pierre Matussière, himself an accomplished skier, from the age of around four or five. Deschamps therefore preferred the description modern mountain girl, since she was the first woman on the French national team whose upbringing had brought her close to the mountains. This opened the way towards concentrating the training of young female skiers in mountain areas, whereas France had previously been represented mainly by girls from Paris, such as Zizi du Manoir.

Diligent and serious, Matussière joined the French national team and learned the French skiing technique taught by Maurice Lafforgue. Her performances immediately challenged the existing choices for the national squad. The World Championships were scheduled for February 1939 in the Polish resort of Zakopane, and only four women could be selected; Matussière was the youngest contender. A series of races was organised to determine the selection, but four skiers soon stood out on results: Matussière, Cécile Agnel, de la Fressange and Villan. In early January 1939, at the sixth Grand Prix of the Ski Club de Paris in Megève, she encountered the great champion Christl Cranz. Although her talent had not yet consistently translated into results, the French team management praised her as the future of French women's skiing. Matussière was duly confirmed as one of the four French competitors for the Zakopane championships, with a month of preparation planned, even though she had not yet turned sixteen. On 23 January 1939 she left for Zakopane by train with the French delegation, including the 1938 World Championship medallists Émile Allais and James Couttet. The team travelled in a carriage reserved for them, going directly to Zakopane under an arrangement with the Polish and German customs authorities.

==== 1939: First World Championships ====
Downhill standings at the 1939 World Championships

Rank
Name
1st
Christl Cranz
2nd
Lisa Resch
3rd
Helga Gödl
4th
Françoise Matussière

The World Championships comprised three events : downhill, slalom and combined, the last of which was determined by the results in the other two events. As these were the first championships organised under the International Ski and Snowboard Federation (FIS) in which the fifteen-year-old Matussière participated, she was assigned a third-group starting bib, number 23. The downhill, held on 12 February 1939, was dominated by the German competitors: Christl Cranz (aged 24) won the world title ahead of Lisa Resch (30) and Helga Gödl (23). Skiing with youthful fearlessness, Matussière finished just off the podium in fourth place, the highest-placed Frenchwoman, less than two seconds behind Gödl. In the slalom on 15 February, Matussière fared much less well, falling three times during the first run and then being disqualified on the second for missing a gate. She therefore also went unclassified in the combined. Her downhill performance was widely praised in the press in France, which compared her precocious skiing talent to that of Suzanne Lenglen in tennis twenty years earlier.

==== 1939–1941: Leading the French team until her withdrawal in 1941 ====
After this major event of the winter season, Matussière travelled with part of the French team to Romania for a competition involving Romanian, German, Czechoslovak and Yugoslav skiers, which she won. Then, she returned to France for the national championships, held in Luchon in early March, following previous editions there in 1923, 1929 and 1934. Weakened by fatigue, she finished tenth in the downhill, eighth in the slalom and therefore ninth in the combined. She subsequently competed at the Arlberg-Kandahar in Mürren, finishing sixth in the downhill and fourth in the slalom for fifth overall in the combined. In June 1939, she won an unusual event combining a ski downhill on a slope at Auron with a swimming race along the Promenade des Anglais in Nice. Despite the Second World War, skiing continued to be organised in December 1940. Matussière remained in the French national team, whose women's squad was now coached by Louis Agnel, with Allais as head coach, and had become one of its leading figures despite being only seventeen. The team also included Georgette Thiollière and Cécile Agnel. She won the Grand Prix de Megève in late January 1941 and the French national title in March 1941. On 25 April 1941, she married Marc Gignoux in a strictly private ceremony in Grenoble. Marc was the leading skier from the Lyon region and the brother of Paul Gignoux, who headed the French skiing team. She announced her retirement from competition in November 1941.

==== 1943–1946: Return to competition ====
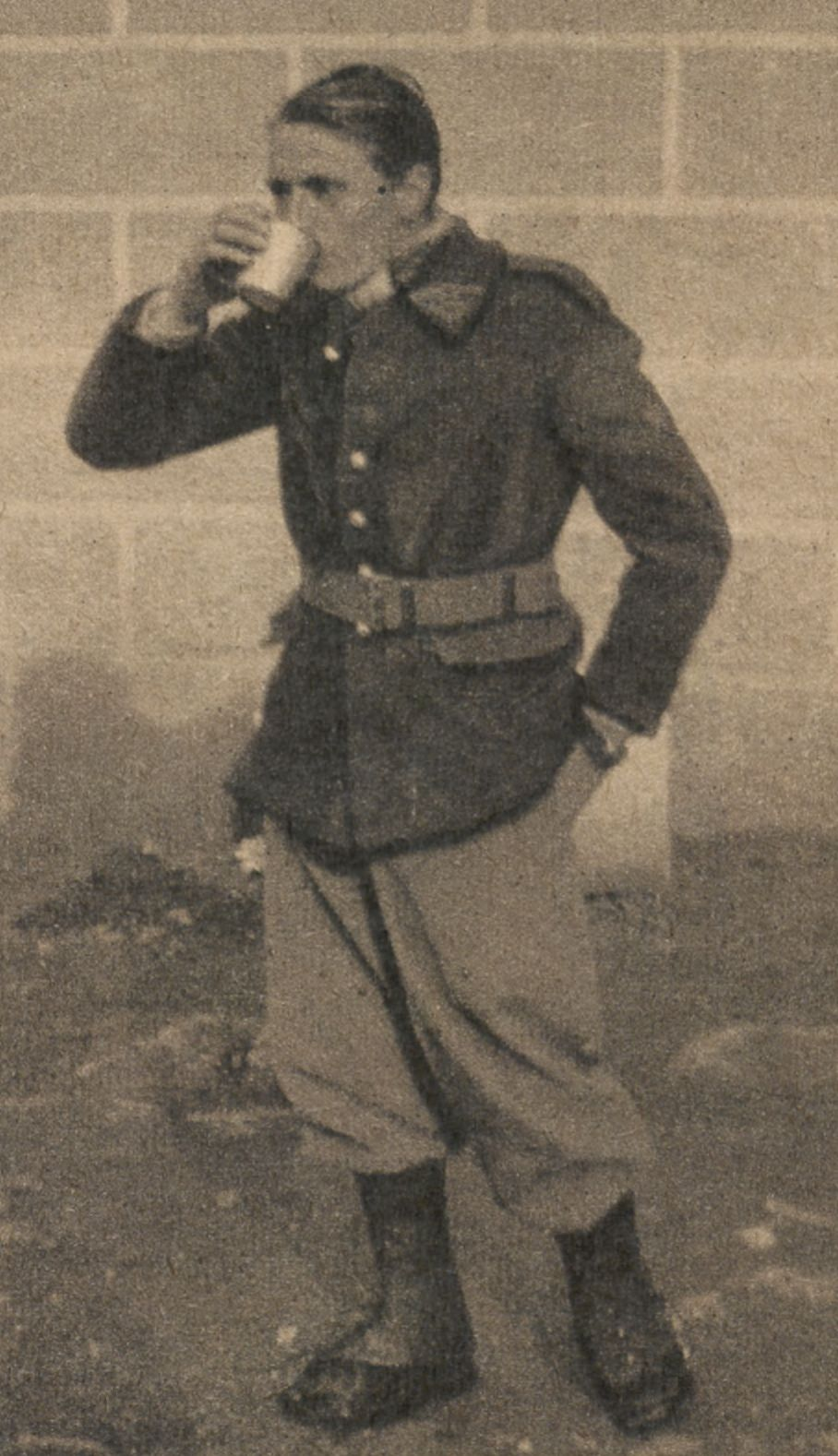
Émile Allais renewed his confidence in Françoise Matussière Gignoux.

After two years away, Françoise, now known as Gignoux, returned to competitive alpine skiing in a race at Megève and was quickly readmitted to the French national team, selected by Émile Allais. At that time, international skiing events were suspended because of the war, so only domestic competitions took place; in France, these events were restricted to French competitors. At Megève she finished second behind Georgette Thiollière and ahead of Lucienne Couttet. The French women's team was still coached by Maurice Lafforgue. In February 1943, she suffered a serious ankle fracture during downhill training at Serre Chevalier, ending her season.

==== 1946: International competition resumes ====
In December 1945, ahead of the 1945–1946 season, the French national team, now coached by James Couttet, comprised only four women: Gignoux, Georgette and Suzanne Thiollière, and Lucienne Couttet. Gignoux achieved a series of strong performances in 1946, placing fourth in the Megève combined in February and second in the Zermatt combined in March. The question arose of whether Gignoux or Georgette Thiollière should lead the women's team. Now the mother of two children, Gignoux had returned to competition only the previous year, while Thiollière planned to spend the season in the United States at Sun Valley. Gignoux therefore took charge of organising training and leading the French women's team, with the clear goal of succeeding at the 1948 Winter Olympics in St. Moritz. With Georgette Thiollière absent and Lucienne Schmidt-Couttet pregnant, the team welcomed Micheline Desmazières, Fernande Bayetto and the junior Jacqueline Martel. On 12 January 1947, Gignoux scored a prestigious victory in the combined on the famous Lauberhorn course at Wengen, after finishing second in the downhill behind Switzerland's Lina Mittner and winning the slalom. This was the only occasion in alpine skiing history on which women were permitted to race down the Lauberhorn course. She subsequently recorded other high placings at Grindelwald and at the Arlberg-Kandahar in Mürren.

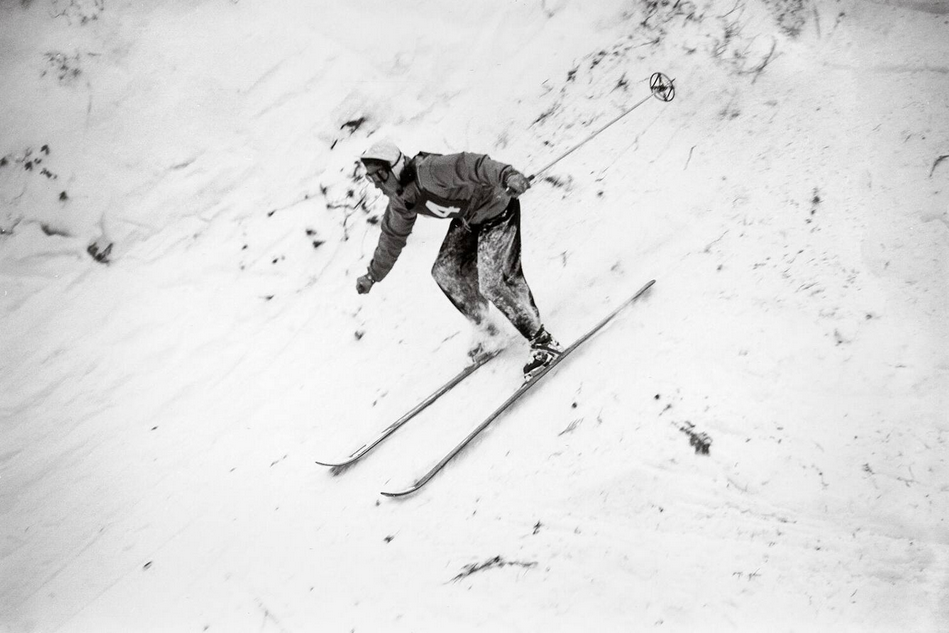
Françoise Gignoux racing down the Lauberhorn course at Wengen in 1947.

For the 1947–1948 season, with the Olympic Games returning after the war, France had high ambitions and retained the core of its team: Gignoux alongside the Thiollière sisters, Desmazières, Bayetto, Schmidt-Couttet and Martel. In December 1947, the French Ski Federation also changed its approach to women's skiing by creating a separate committee for the women's team, in line with the international federation's wish to separate men's and women's events. Gignoux was appointed chair of this FFS committee. At the end of December, the federation confirmed that six French women would compete in the first postwar Winter Olympics, with Gignoux regarded as a natural medal contender. To complete her preparations, she entered the prestigious races at Grindelwald, finishing third in the downhill, fourth in the giant slalom (a newly introduced event not yet on the Olympic programme in 1948) and fifth in the combined. She travelled to the Olympic venue, St. Moritz, in mid-January.

==== 1948: St. Moritz Olympics and retirement from alpine skiing at 25 ====
Françoise Gignoux's results at the 1948 Olympics

Event
Rank
Downhill
7th
Slalom
12th
Combined
5th

In the first Olympic event, which also counted towards the World Championships, the downhill on 2 February 1948, Gignoux was assigned a relatively high starting number, 15. She finished seventh, two seconds outside the podium, in a race won by Switzerland's Hedy Schlunegger. On 4 February, she took fifth in the combined slalom portion, moving up to fifth overall in the combined and finishing as the leading Frenchwoman. Praised for her consistency since the beginning of her career, Gignoux received recognition for her performances despite missing out on an Olympic medal. In the third and final Olympic event, the special slalom, she started with bib number 9 and completed two consistent but unspectacular runs, leaving her unable to challenge for victory or a podium place; she finished a distant twelfth.

After the Olympic Games, Gignoux took part in the women's national criterium at Megève, an event she had helped initiate as chair of the FFS women's skiing committee. She finished second in both the downhill (behind Odette d'Hespel) and the slalom (behind Lucienne Schmidt-Couttet), winning the combined. At the end of February, at the French Championships in Luchon, she won the downhill ahead of Bayetto and the combined, and took bronze in the slalom. Having just turned twenty-five, she announced her definitive retirement from alpine skiing after these two titles, saying:

I am delighted. Everything went well; I very much liked the course, which was a little easier than the one at St. Moritz. I am happy to retire on this victory, because next year I will no longer compete. I must now devote more time to my two little girls

. She completed the season with one last appearance at the Arlberg-Kandahar at Chamonix, followed by her final races at Galdhøpiggen in Norway.

=== 1950s: Tour de France Automobile victory and a book on motor racing ===
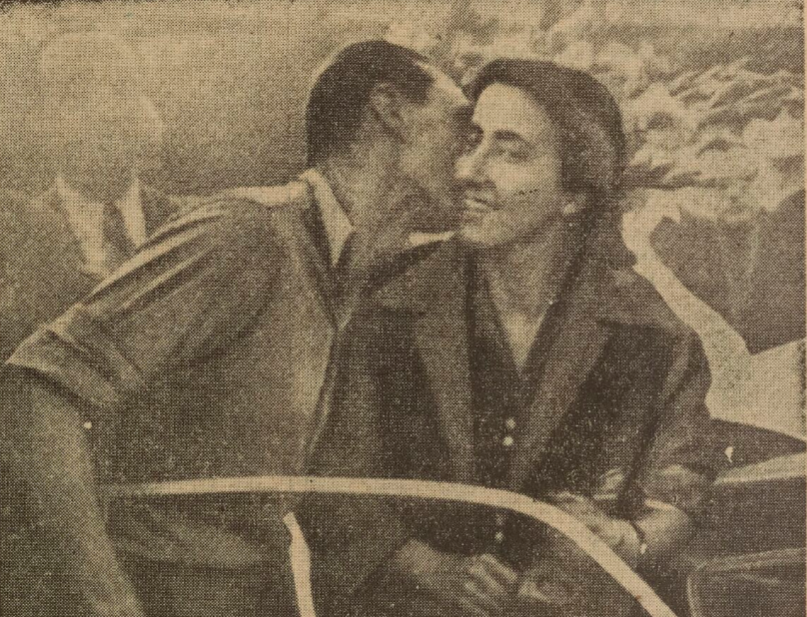
Marc and Françoise Gignoux celebrating their victory in the 1952 Tour de France Automobile.

In the following years, her husband, Marc Gignoux, achieved prestigious motor-racing victories, including the Rhône-Charbonnières Rally in 1950 and the Mille Miglia endurance race in 1952. Françoise became his co-driver for his second appearance in the Tour de France Automobile in 1952, driving a DB 750 developed by Roland Touzot. It was the first time Marc had been accompanied by a woman in a motor race. A total of 108 crews started the event, which consisted of three stages linking Nice, La Baule and Reims, covering 5,533 km. Marc and Françoise Gignoux won ahead of the Ferrari 225 S driven by Pierre Pagnibon and the Renault 4CV 1063 driven by Jean Rédélé. During the event, she drew a comparison between alpine skiing and motor racing, saying:

In a car, as on skis, you have to feel the skid and know how to control it.

Her husband also paid tribute to her:

Françoise helped me magnificently. She took the wheel during the night, between Cahors and Clermont-Ferrand, when I was falling asleep. That was the difficult moment, and thanks to my wife we came through it perfectly.

In 1959, she and her husband published Elle au volant ('She at the Wheel') with Éditions Arthème Fayard, illustrated by Siné.

== Alpine skiing results ==
=== Olympic Games ===
Françoise Gignoux's results at the 1948 Winter Olympics
| Event / Edition | Age | Downhill | Slalom | Combined |
|---|---|---|---|---|
| 1948 Olympic Games (Switzerland) Saint-Moritz | 25 | 7th | 12th | 5th |

=== World Championships ===
The Olympic alpine skiing events between 1948 and 1982 also counted as World Championships, so Olympic champions were automatically world champions.

Françoise Gignoux's results at the World Championships
| Event / Edition | Age | Downhill | Slalom | Combined |
|---|---|---|---|---|
| 1939 World Championships (Poland) Zakopane | 15 | 4th | DSQ | DNF |
| 1948 Olympic Games (Switzerland) Saint-Moritz | 25 | 7th | 12th | 5th |

=== French national championships ===
Françoise Gignoux's results at the French Championships (Note: Results achieved by skiers of foreign nationality are not included in these standings.)
| Event / Edition | Age | Downhill | Slalom | Combined |
|---|---|---|---|---|
| 1946; Chamonix | 23 | – | 3 | – |
| 1948; Superbagnères | 25 | 1 | 3 | 1 |

== Motor racing results ==
=== Victories ===
- Tour de France Automobile (5,533 km): 1952 (second edition), in a DB 750 (the Panhard–Gignoux Coupé, with a metal body, three examples made), with her husband Marc Gignoux, winning on the index classification (overall standings).

== Publications ==
- Elle au volant, co-written with Marc Gignoux, illustrated by Siné, Fayard, 1959.
