= Cross-country skiing at the 1956 Winter Olympics – Women's 10 kilometre =

Women's 10km at the VII Olympic Winter Games
- Cross-country skiing
- Venue: Stadio della neve
- Date: January 28, 1956
- Competitors: 40 from 11 nations
- Winning time: 38:11.0

Medalists
1st place, gold medalist(s)		Lyubov Kozyreva	Soviet Union
2nd place, silver medalist(s)		Radya Yeroshina	Soviet Union
3rd place, bronze medalist(s)		Sonja Edström	Sweden

The ladies' 10 kilometre cross-country race at the 1956 Winter Olympics was held on 28 January. It was held at the Snow Stadium (Lo Stadio della neve), which was about 2 km (1.2 mi) from Cortina. Thirty-seven competitors from eleven countries participated in the event. The Soviet Union won the top two spots when Lyubov Kozyreva edged teammate Radya Yeroshina by 5 seconds. Swede Sonja Edström won the bronze.

== Medalists ==
Gold	Lyubov Kozyreva; Soviet Union
Silver	Radya Yeroshina; Soviet Union
Bronze	Sonja Edström; Sweden

== Results ==
Place	No.	Competitor	Time	Difference*
1	32	Lyubov Kozyreva (URS)	38:11	
2	15	Radya Yeroshina (URS)	38:16	+0.05
3	38	Sonja Edström (SWE)	38:23	+0.12
4	28	Alevtina Kolchina (URS)	38:46	+0.35
5	37	Siiri Rantanen (FIN)	39:40	+1.29
6	21	Mirja Hietamies (FIN)	40:18	+2.07
7	29	Irma Johansson (SWE)	40:20	+2.09
8	9	Sirkka Polkunen (FIN)	40:25	+2.14
9	7	Anna Kaaleste (URS)	40:29	+2.18
10	31	Kjelfrid Brusveen (NOR)	40:38	+2.27
11	22	Rakel Wahl (NOR)	40:49	+2.38
12	14	Sanna Kiero (FIN)	40:52	+2.41
13	11	Anna Lisa Eriksson (SWE)	40:56	+2.45
14	3	Barbro Martinsson (SWE)	41:04	+2.53
14	40	Eva Lauermanová (TCH)	41:04	+2.53
16	27	Maria Gąsienica Bukowa-Kowalska (POL)	41:09	+2.58
17		Józefa Czerniawska-Pęksa (POL)	41:28	+3.15
18	34	Zofia Krzeptowska (POL)	41:37	+3.26
19	30	Libuse Patockova (TCH)	41:52	+3.41
20	33	Sonnhilde Hausschild-Kallus (EUA)	42:22	+4.11
21	13	Else Amann (EUA)	42:22	+4.11
22	8	Gina Regland (NOR)	42:42	+4.31
23	35	Ildegarda Taffra (ITA)	42:51	+4.40
24	4	Helena Daniel-Gasienica (POL)	43:09	+4.58
25	18	Olga Krasilova (TCH)	43:10	+4.59
26	26	Elfriede Uhlig (EUA)	43:15	+5.04
27	20	Ingrid Wigernaes (NOR)	43:40	+5.29
28	10	Eva Benesova (TCH)	43:42	+5.31
29	6	Rita Blasel-Czechova (EUA)	43:51	+5.40
30	17	Rita Bottero (ITA)	44:03	+5.58
31	23	Fides Romanin (ITA)	44:17	+6.06
32	19	Amalija Belaj (YUG)	45:32	+7.21
33	41	Mara Rekar (YUG)	45:36	+7.25
34	36	Maria Peneva Dimova (BUL)	45:52	+7.41
35		Nada Birko Kustec (YUG)	46:03	+7.52
36	5	Blazenka Vodenlic (YUG)	46:28	+8.17
37	1	Anita Parmesani (ITA)	47:37	+9.26
38	24	Iuliana Simon (ROM)	49:32	+11.21
39	12	Ștefania Botcariu (ROM)	49:37	+11.26
40		Margareta Arvay (ROM)	DQ	

* - Difference is in minutes and seconds.

== See also ==
- List of IOC country codes
- 1956 Winter Olympics

== Sources ==
- Comitato Olimpico Nazionale Italiano (1956). VII Olympic Winter Games: Official Report (PDF). Cortina d'Ampezzo. Archived from the original (PDF) on 2010-11-02.
