= Árvai =

Árvai [ˈaːrvɒi] or Árvay is a Hungarian habitational surname originally used for a person coming from the historical Árva County (14th century–1920), which today is divided between Slovakia and Poland. It may refer to:

== Árvai/Arvai ==
- Attila Árvai (born 1974), Hungarian bicycle racer
- Ferenc Árvai (1935–2004), Hungarian sculptor and painter
- György Árvai (1697–1759), Hungarian monk, poet and teacher
- Jolán Árvai (1947–2001), Hungarian film director, producer and editor
- Peter Arvai (born 1979), Swedish businessman of Hungarian parentage
- Péter Árvai (born 1989), Hungarian actor

== Árvay/Arvay ==
- Alica Árvay (born 1970), Slovak-Hungarian poet and writer
- Árpád Árvay (1902–1985), Romanian journalist
- Clemens Arvay (born 1980), Austrian biologist and author
- Gergely Árvay (1790–1871), Hungarian friar, writer and canon
- Herman Arvay (born 1964), Slovak politician
- István Árvay (1818–1889), Hungarian lawyer, writer and journalist
- János Árvay (1924–1996), Hungarian statistician
- Joseph Arvay (1949–2020), Canadian lawyer
- Lajos Árvay (1852–1924), Hungarian lawyer
- Margareta Arvay (born 1937), Romanian cross-country skier
- Mihály Árvay (1708–1750), Jesuit teacher, poet and literary historian
- Zsolt Árvay (born 1935), Hungarian chemical engineer
