= Yugoslavia at the 1952 Winter Olympics =

- Flag of Yugoslavia
- IOC code: YUG
- NOC: Yugoslav Olympic Committee

in Oslo
- Competitors: 6 (4 men, 2 women) in 3 sports
- Medals: Gold 0 Silver 0 Bronze 0 Total 0

Winter Olympics appearances (overview)
- 1924; 1928; 1932; 1936; 1948; 1952; 1956; 1960; 1964; 1968; 1972; 1976; 1980; 1984; 1988; 1992; 1994; 1998; 2002

Other related appearances
- Croatia (1992–pres.); Slovenia (1992–pres.); Bosnia and Herzegovina (1994–pres.); North Macedonia (1998–pres.); Serbia and Montenegro (1998–2006); Montenegro (2010–pres.); Serbia (2010–pres.); Kosovo (2018–pres.)

Athletes from the Federal People's Republic of Yugoslavia competed at the 1952 Winter Olympics in Oslo, Norway.

== Alpine skiing ==
Men

Athlete	Event	Race 1		Race 2		Total	
Athlete	Event	Time	Rank	Time	Rank	Time	Rank
Janko Štefe	Downhill					2:40.6	13
Janko Štefe	Giant Slalom					2:47.5	33
Tine Mulej	Giant Slalom					2:41.3	27
Tine Mulej	Slalom	1:07.5	36	did not advance			
Janko Štefe	Slalom	1:03.7	18 Q	DSQ	–	DSQ	–

== Cross-country skiing ==
Women

Event	Athlete	Race	
Event	Athlete	Time	Rank
10 km	Angela Kordež	52:33	16
10 km	Nada Birko-Kustec	50:44	14

== Ski jumping ==
Athlete	Event	Jump 1			Jump 2			Total	
Athlete	Event	Distance	Points	Rank	Distance	Points	Rank	Points	Rank
Karel Klančnik	Normal hill	60.0	96.5	24	56.5	92.0	34	188.5	29
Janez Polda	Normal hill	62.5	101.0	17	62.0	99.5	19	200.5	16
