= Mariya Dimova =

Mariya Dimova may refer to:

- Mariya Dimova (skier)
- Mariya Dimova (snowboarder)
