= Matthias Lindner =

Matthias Lindner may refer to:

- Matthias Lindner (German footballer) (born 1965), former football (soccer) defender
- Matthias Lindner (Austrian footballer) (born 1988), football (soccer) forward
- Matthias Lindner (athlete), German track and field athlete
