= Brusveen =

Brusveen is a Norwegian surname. Notable people with the surname include:

- Håkon Brusveen (1927–2021), Norwegian cross-country skier
- Kjelfrid Brusveen (1926–2009), Norwegian cross country skier
