= Per Olsen =

Per Olsen may refer to:

- Per Olsen (cross-country skier) (1932–2013), Norwegian cross country skier
- Per Olsen (swimmer) (born 1934), Norwegian swimmer
- Per Arne Olsen (born 1961), Norwegian politician
- Per Erling Olsen (born 1958), Norwegian javelin thrower
- Per Olaf Olsen (1871–1919), Norwegian sports shooter
- Per Skjerwen Olsen (born 1939), Norwegian ice hockey player and football player
