= Tangen (surname) =

Tangen is a surname. Notable people with the surname include:

- Christopher von Tangen (1877–1941), Norwegian fencer
- Eivind Tangen (born 1993), Norwegian handball player
- Harald Nilsen Tangen (born 2001), Norwegian footballer
- Jens Tangen (1897–1980), Norwegian trade unionist
- Knut Tangen (1928–2007), Norwegian speed skater
- Nicolai Tangen (born 1966), Norwegian hedge fund manager
- Otto Tangen (1886–1956), Norwegian Nordic skier
- Ragne Tangen (1927–2015), Norwegian children's television presenter
