= Giuliana Minuzzo =

Italian alpine skier (1931–2020)

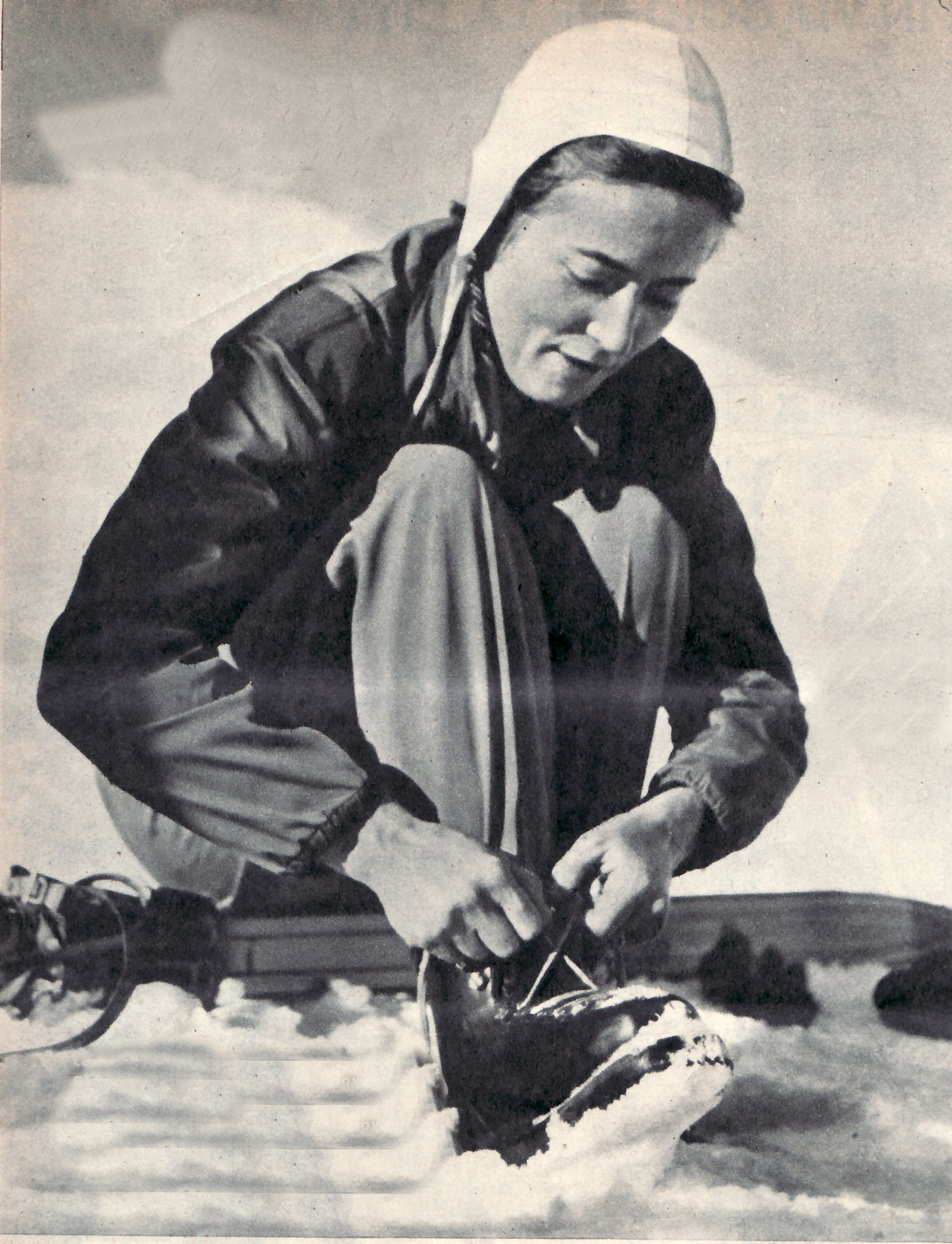
- Minuzzo in 1955

Personal information
- Born: 26 November 1931 Vallonara di Marostica, Italy
- Died: 11 November 2020 (aged 88)

Sport
- Sport: Skiing
Medal record
Women's alpine skiing
Representing Italy
Olympic Games
Bronze medal – third place	1952 Oslo	Downhill
Bronze medal – third place	1960 Squaw Valley	Giant Slalom
World Championships
Bronze medal – third place	1956 Cortina d'Ampezzo	Combined

Giuliana Chenal-Minuzzo (née Minuzzo, 26 November 1931 – 11 November 2020) was an Italian alpine skier.

== Career ==
She was born in Vallonara di Marostica. At the 1952 Olympics in Oslo Minuzzo was the bronze medalist in the women's downhill competition. At the 1960 Olympics in Squaw Valley she was bronze medalist in the women's giant slalom event.

At the 1956 Winter Olympics in Cortina d'Ampezzo, Minuzzo made history by becoming the first woman to take the Olympic Oath.

On 11 November 2020, Minuzzo died at the age of 88.
