= Olga Krasilová =

Czech cross-country skier

Personal information
- Nationality: Czech
- Born: 18 March 1925

Sport
- Sport: Cross-country skiing

Olga Krasilová (born 18 March 1925) Is a Czech cross-country skier. She competed in the women's 10 kilometres at the 1956 Winter Olympics.

== Cross-country skiing results ==
=== Olympic Games ===
Year	Age	10 km	3 × 5 km relay
1956	30	25	—

=== World Championships ===
Year	Age	10 km	3 × 5 km relay
1954	28	—	5
