= Matthias Lindner (footballer, born 1988) =

Austrian footballer

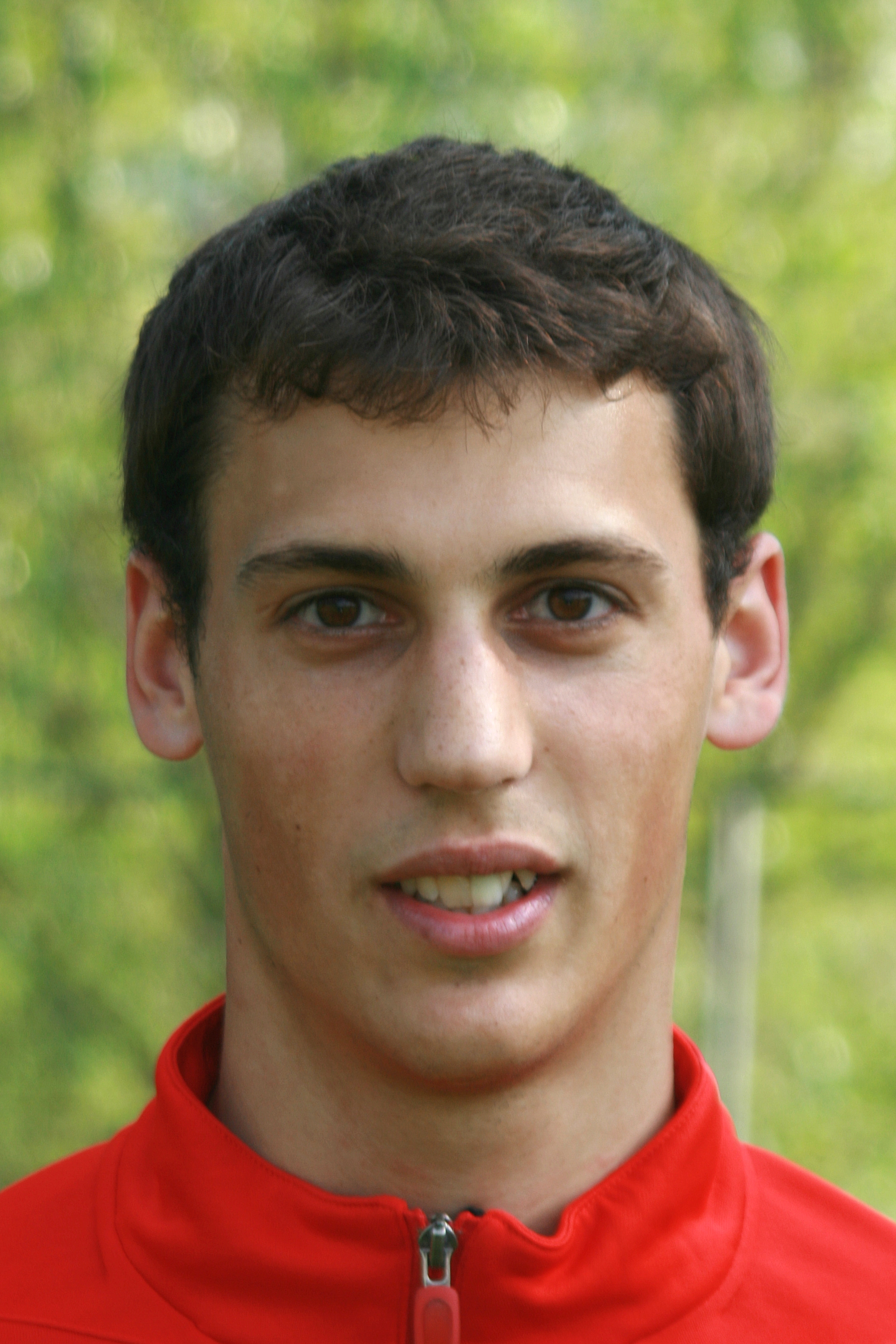

Personal information
- Date of birth: September 7, 1988 (age 38)
- Place of birth: Scheiblingkirchen-Thernberg, Austria
- Height: 1.83 m (6 ft 0 in)
- Position: Forward

Team information
- Current team: FC Blau-Weiß Linz
- Number: 9

Youth career
- Admira Wacker

Senior career*
Years	Team	Apps	(Gls)
2006–2007	Admira Wacker	6	(4)
2007–2011	Mattersburg	23	(5)
2011–2012	Wiener Neustadt	17	(2)
2012–	FC Blau-Weiß Linz	0	(0)
- * Club domestic league appearances and goals as of May 13, 2010

Matthias Lindner (born September 7, 1988 in Scheiblingkirchen-Thernberg, Austria) is a football forward, who plays for FC Blau-Weiß Linz.

== Club career ==
Before joining Mattersburg Lindner played for Admira Wacker, where he came through the youth ranks.
