= Hanni Gehring =

German cross-country skier (1926–2011)

Johanna "Hanni" Gehring (15 August 1926 – 24 March 2011) was a German cross-country skier during the 1950s. She finished 13th in the 10 km event at the 1952 Winter Olympics in Oslo.

== Cross-country skiing results ==
=== Olympic Games ===
Year	Age	10 km
1952	25	13
