= Clemens Arvay =

Austrian author (1980–2023)

Clemens Georg Arvay
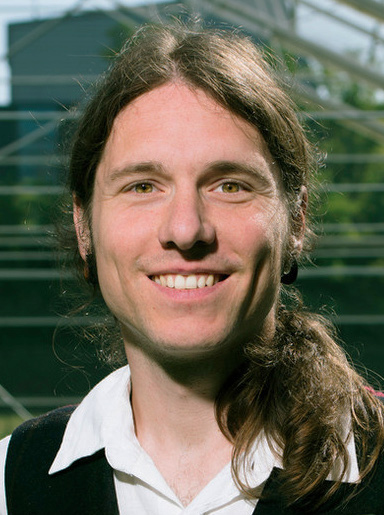
- Arvay in 2017
- Born: 22 July 1980; Graz, Austria
- Died: 18 February 2023 (aged 42); Türkensturz, Gleißenfeld, Scheiblingkirchen-Thernberg, Austria
- Education: University of Graz; University of Natural Resources and Life Sciences, Vienna
- Writing career
- Language: German, English
- Notable works: The Biophilia Effect; The Healing Code of Nature
- Website: clemensarvay.com

Clemens Georg Arvay (22 July 1980 – 18 February 2023) was an Austrian author of nonfiction books with an emphasis on health ecology. In particular, his controversial conclusions about the relationship between the benefit and risk of the COVID-19 vaccine attracted media attention.

== Biography ==
Arvay was born in 1980 in Graz. After initially undergoing an apprenticeship as a bookbinder while completing secondary school, Arvay qualified in landscape ecology at the University of Graz, receiving his bachelor's degree in 2005. In 2007, he also completed his master's degree in Applied Plant Sciences at the University of Natural Resources and Life Sciences in Vienna. Arvay subsequently held various positions, including quality manager for the organic brand "Zurück zum Ursprung" (Back to the Origin) of the Hofer supermarket chain. Later, Arvay temporarily obtained a position working for the Austrian environmental protection organization, Global 2000, a member of Friends of the Earth Europe. From 2012 on Arvay worked exclusively as a freelance author. Some of his books became bestsellers in Germany and Austria. His corpse was found at the bottom of the cliff near the Türkensturz ruins, in Gleißenfeld, Scheiblingkirchen-Thernberg, on February 18, 2023. His death was declared a suicide.

== Publications ==
In 2011, Arvay published his first nonfiction book on forgotten species of vegetables. The author reached a wide readership with his second book Der große Bio-Schmäh (The Big Organic Fraud). Released in 2012, the book offered a look "behind the scenes of the supposedly picture-perfect world of organic foods," which was touted as being "a dispassionate and therefore also credible account." In 2013, in an additional book, Arvay advocated reining in "power-hungry food conglomerates" in favor of regional, small-scale farming. This book also was published in Japanese.

In 2014, Arvay teamed up with the actor Roland Düringer on a book titled Leb wohl Schlaraffenland (Farewell, Land of Plenty) in which both authors discussed the "major philosophical questions in life." As an experiment, Düringer decided to do without modern advances and to live according to the way things were 40 years ago. In the course of additional activities as an author, Arvay once again took on the ramifications of industrial farming, in his book published in 2014, having to do above all with the artificial standardization of food by policymakers and industry, along with the practices of large seed producers.

In Der Biophilia-Effekt (The Biophilia Effect, 2015) and Das Biophilia-Training (The Biophilia Training, 2016), the author analyzed the healing effect of the forest. In the two books, Arvay touted the forest as the "best fitness gym in the world"; The English edition of The Biophilia Effect was published in 2018. It contains a foreword by biologist Marc Bekoff. In 2016, Arvay revisited this topic in a book entitled Der Heilungscode der Natur (The Healing Code of Nature, 2018). Specifically, the work discusses the positive effects of plants and animals on the human immune system. His work Biophilia in der Stadt (Biophilia in the City, 2018) deals with the effects of nature and green spaces on urban public health. Brain scientist Gerald Hüther wrote the foreword to the book. In the book Mit den Bäumen wachsen wir in den Himmel: Autistische Kinder mit der Heilkraft des Waldes fördern (Forest therapy and the autism spectrum: advancing the development of children through biodiversity, 2019), Arvay describes developmental opportunities in the forest for children on the autism spectrum, supporting his explanations with current research.

In 2019, the International Handbook of Forest Therapy was published by Cambridge Scholars Publishing; it consists of two chapters that are written by Arvay. In 2020 he published Wir können es besser (We Can Do Better), claiming a correlation between environmental damages, loss of biodiversity, and the emergence and spread of SARS-CoV-2. Arvay's book Die Naturgeschichte des Immunsystems (The Natural History of the Immune System) was published in 2022 by Quadriga, Bastei Lübbe. It deals with the evolutionary development of the immune systems of humans, animals, and plants.

== COVID-19 controversy ==
Arvay appeared as a public critic of the COVID-19 vaccines, more specifically the shortened clinical approval process for the vaccine development against SARS-CoV-2. About this issue, he published an article in the Swiss Medical Journal (Schweizerische Ärztezeitung) as well as a book with the title Corona-Impfstoffe: Rettung oder Risiko? (Corona vaccines: rescue or risk?, Bastei Luebbe, 2021). He was invited to a panel discussion on Austrian public television ORF to talk about these concerns in November 2020 and posted several related videos on his YouTube channel, which were deleted by him later. According to Arvay, in animal experiments the vaccine candidate AZD1222 did not achieve sufficient protection against the infection and led to significant side effects in the combined clinical phases I/II. Fabian Schmidt wrote in Deutsche Welle that Arvay drew a narrative according to which the pharmaceutical industry and investors such as Bill Gates wanted to bring the vaccines to the market at any price and for profit, even if they put public health at risk.

The German virologist Stephan Becker, who was involved in the vaccine study in the early stages, did not share Arvay's concerns about a lack of care. For him, the test data in animals and humans showed a desired immune response. In contrast to Arvay, Becker considered the side effects shown so far to be acceptable, but advised carefully considering whether the risk for a patient outweighs the protection against the coronavirus infection. In an article in the Austrian newspaper Falter, Barbara Tóth sees Arvay as a "classic Corona free rider" who also used criticism of the containment measures against COVID-19 as a business model.

According to the Robert Koch Institute (RKI), all COVID-19 vaccines approved in the European Union are safe, effective, and overall have a good risk-benefit profile according to the current state of science (1 April 2021).
