= Lizzy Kladensky =

Austrian cross-country skier (born 1925)

Lizzy Kladensky (27 March 1925 – in or before 2019) was an Austrian cross-country skier during the 1950s. She competed in the 10 km event at the 1952 Winter Olympics in Oslo, and did not finish. Kladensky died in or before 2019.

== Cross-country skiing results ==
=== Olympic Games ===
Year	Age	10 km
1952	26	DNF
