= Odd Solli =

Norwegian bobsledder

Odd Solli (8 August 1924 – 29 March 2007) was a Norwegian bobsledder. He was born in Stabekk. He competed at the 1956 Winter Olympics in Cortina d'Ampezzo, where he placed 20th in men's two, together with Arne Røgden, and 11th in men's four.
