= Margit Albrechtsson =

Swedish cross-country skier

Margit Åsberg-Albrechtsson (February 2, 1918, in Selånger – April 6, 1994) was a Swedish cross-country skier who competed in the 1950s. She finished eighth in the 10 km event at the 1952 Winter Olympics in Oslo.

== Cross-country skiing results ==
=== Olympic Games ===
| Year | Age | 10 km |
|---|---|---|
| 1952 | 34 | 8 |
