= Eivor Alm =

Swedish cross-country skier

Eivor Matilda Astergren, née Alm (29 June 1924 – 5 March 2011) was a Swedish cross-country skier who competed in the 1950s. She finished ninth in the 10 km event at the 1952 Winter Olympics in Oslo. She was born in Almunge.

== Cross-country skiing results ==
=== Olympic Games ===
Year	Age	10 km
1952	27	9
