= Betty Weir =

American alpine skier (1924–2020)

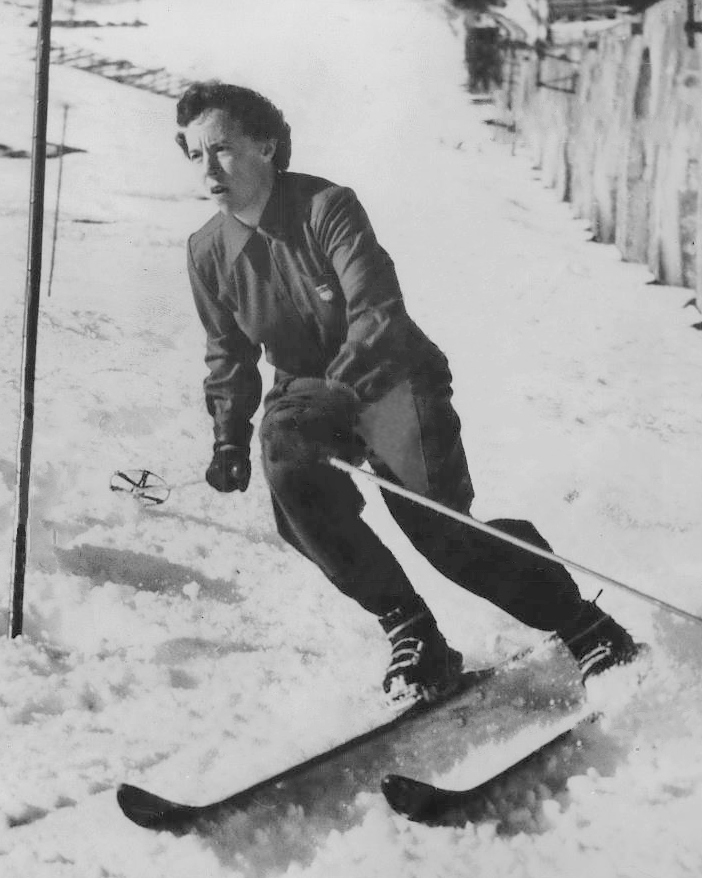
- Weir in 1952

Personal information
- Born: June 20, 1924 Columbus, Ohio, U.S.
- Died: March 6, 2020 (aged 95)
- Height: 168 cm (5 ft 6 in)
- Weight: 66 kg (146 lb)

Sport
- Sport: Alpine skiing
- Club: Sun Valley Ski Club

Betty Ellen Weir (later Bell, June 20, 1924 – March 6, 2020) was an American alpine skier. She competed in the downhill event at the 1952 Winter Olympics and placed 19th. Weir took up skiing in 1948 and placed second in the downhill at the 1952 U.S. Olympic trials. She retired soon after the Games and married Ned Bell in Sun Valley. She then worked for many years for Idaho Mountain Express newspaper.
