= Sanna Kiero =

Finnish cross-country skier

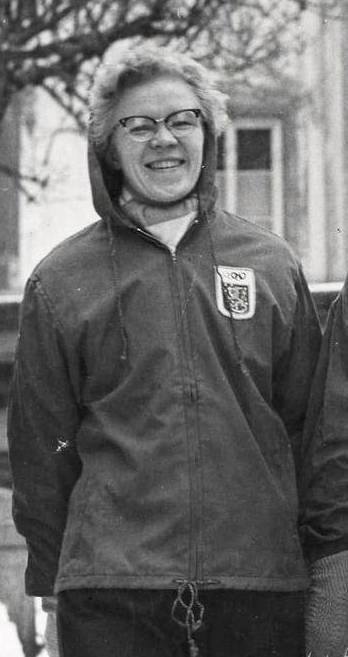
- Sanna Kiero in 1956.

Personal information
- Nationality: Finnish
- Born: 13 September 1930 Lappeenranta, Finland
- Died: 31 January 2010 (aged 79) Lappeenranta, Finland

Sport
- Sport: Cross-country skiing

Sanna Kiero (13 September 1930 – 31 January 2010) was a Finnish cross-country skier. She competed in the women's 10 kilometres at the 1956 Winter Olympics.

== Cross-country skiing results ==
=== Olympic Games ===
Year	Age	10 km	3 × 5 km relay
1956	25	12	—
