= Lydia Wideman =

Finnish cross-country skier (1920–2019)

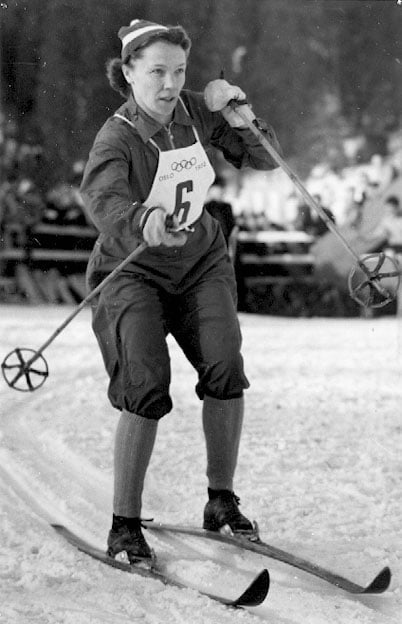
- Wideman at the 1952 Olympics

Personal information
- Born: 17 May 1920 Vilppula, Finland
- Died: 13 April 2019 (aged 98) Tampere, Finland
- Height: 163 cm (5 ft 4 in)
- Weight: 61–62 kg (134–137 lb)

Sport
- Sport: Cross-country skiing
- Club: Tampereen Hiihtoseura
Medal record
Women's cross-country skiing
Representing Finland
Olympic Games
Gold medal – first place	1952 Oslo	10 km

Lydia Wideman (later Wideman-Lehtonen, 17 May 1920 – 13 April 2019) was a cross-country skier from Finland and the first female Olympic medalist in cross-country skiing. In 1952 she competed in thirteen 10 km races and won all of them, including the 1952 Winter Olympics, national championships and Lahti Ski Games.

Wideman and her twin sister Tyyne were born in a family of ten siblings. Many members of her family were skilled cross-country skiers. In particular, Tyyne won the national 10 km title in 1949–1951, beating Lydia in 1951, but retiring the same year.

In February 2018, following the death of Durward Knowles, she became the oldest living Olympic champion. She died on 13 April 2019, aged 98.

== Cross-country skiing results ==
All results are sourced from the International Ski Federation (FIS).

=== Olympic Games ===
Year	Age	10 km
1952	31	Gold
