= Slava Zupančič =

Slovenian alpine skier (1931–2000)

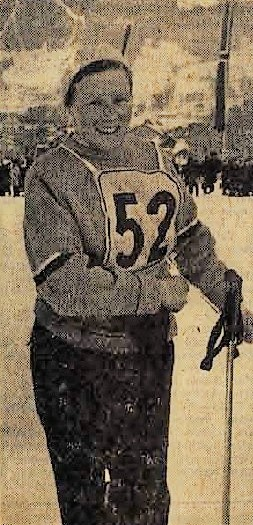
- Slava Zupančič in 1959

Personal information
- Nationality: Slovenian
- Born: 5 July 1931; Kranj, Kingdom of Yugoslavia
- Died: 2 April 2000 (aged 68); Ljubljana, Slovenia

Sport
- Sport: Alpine skiing

Slava Zupančič (5 July 1931 – 2 April 2000) was a Slovenian alpine skier. She competed in three events at the 1956 Winter Olympics, representing Yugoslavia.

Awards
| Preceded by Nada Vučković | Yugoslav Sportswoman of the Year; 1958 | Succeeded by Draga Stamejčić |
