= Matevž Kordež =

Slovenian cross-country skier

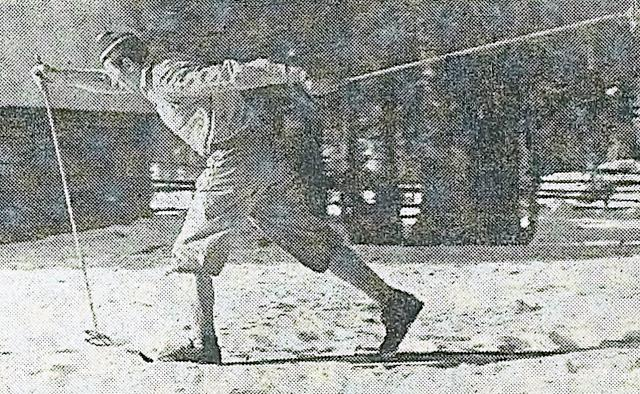

Personal information
- Nationality: Slovenian
- Born: 13 September 1919; Kropa, Yugoslavia
- Died: May 1992 (aged 72)

Sport
- Sport: Cross-country skiing

Matevž Kordež (13 September 1919 – May 1992) was a Slovenian cross-country skier. He competed at the 1948 Winter Olympics and the 1956 Winter Olympics.
