= Micheline Desmazières =

French alpine skier (born 1926)

Micheline Madeleine Georgette Deplanck (née Desmazières; born 23 February 1926) is a French retired alpine skier who competed in the 1948 Winter Olympics.
