= Inger Jørgensen =

Norwegian alpine skier

Personal information
- Nationality: Norway
- Born: 30 October 1930 (age 95) Asker

Sport
- Sport: Skiing
- Club: Asker SK

Inger Jørgensen (born 30 October 1930) is a retired Norwegian alpine skier. She was born in Asker. Jørgensen represented Asker SK, and is the sister of Dagny Jørgensen. She participated at the 1956 Winter Olympics in Cortina d'Ampezzo, where she competed in downhill, slalom and giant slalom. She became Norwegian champion in slalom in 1953 and 1954, and in giant slalom in 1956.
