= Maurice Sanglard =

French alpine skier (1927–1963)

Personal information
- Nationality: French
- Born: 19 August 1927; Chamonix, France
- Died: April 1963; Chamonix, France

Sport
- Sport: Alpine skiing

Maurice Sanglard (19 August 1927 – April 1963) was a French alpine skier. He competed in three events at the 1952 Winter Olympics.
