= Peter Cooke (sailor) =

Kenyan sailor

Peter Cooke (23 September 1924 – 27 December 2001) was a Kenyan sailor. He competed in the Finn class at the 1964 Summer Olympic games in Tokyo, Japan.
