= Gina Sigstad =

Norwegian cross-country skier

Gina Regland-Sigstad (September 16, 1927 – October 5, 2015) was a Norwegian cross-country skier who competed in the 1950s. She finished tenth in the 10 km event at the 1952 Winter Olympics in Oslo.

== Cross-country skiing results ==
=== Olympic Games ===
Year	Age	10 km	3 × 5 km relay
1952	24	10	—N/a
1956	28	22	4

=== World Championships ===
Year	Age	10 km	3 × 5 km relay
1954	26	25	—
1958	30	29	7
