= Amalija Belaj =

Slovenian cross-country skier

Personal information
- Nationality: Slovenian
- Born: 25 June 1935 (age 90) Celje, Yugoslavia

Sport
- Sport: Cross-country skiing

Amalija Belaj Arbeiter (born 25 June 1935) is a Slovenian former cross-country skier and factory worker. She competed in the women's 10 kilometres and the women's 3 × 5 kilometre relay events at the 1956 Winter Olympics, representing Yugoslavia.
