= Eynon Hawkins =

Wales international rugby league footballer

Eynon Hawkins GC AM
Personal information
- Born: 26 June 1920 Llanharan, Wales
- Died: 17 December 2001 (aged 81) Bridgend, Wales

Playing information

Rugby union
Club
Years	Team	Pld	T	G	FG	P
	Llanharan RFC
	Bridgend RFC
	Total	0	0	0	0	0
Representative
Years	Team	Pld	T	G	FG	P
	Glamorgan

Rugby league
- Position: Prop
Club
Years	Team	Pld	T	G	FG	P
1948–52	Salford	93	4	0	0	12
≤1953–≥53	Rochdale Hornets
	Total	93	4	0	0	12
Representative
Years	Team	Pld	T	G	FG	P
1949–53	Wales	6

Eynon Hawkins GC AM (26 June 1920 – 17 December 2001) was an Albert Medal and George Cross World War II hero and a Welsh rugby union and rugby league footballer who played in the 1940s and 1950s. He played representative level rugby union (RU) for Glamorgan County RFC, and at club level for Llanharan RFC and Bridgend RFC, and representative level rugby league (RL) for Wales, and at club level for Salford and Rochdale Hornets, as a prop.

== Early life ==
The son of a miner, Eynon Hawkins was born in Llanharan, in Glamorgan. Educated locally, he left school at 14 and went into the mining industry working in Llanharan Powell Duffryn colliery, playing rugby union for Llanharan RFC, Bridgend RFC and Glamorgan County RFC in his spare time. He joined the navy in 1940, and, after training at HMS Raleigh and HMS Drake, he spent nine months on a trawler patrolling the English Channel, before transferring as a seaman gunner to the defensively armed merchant ship (Dems), with whom he served in the Atlantic, Mediterranean and Indian oceans.

== War experience ==
On 11 January 1943 Eynon was a Royal Navy able-seaman serving as a gunner aboard the British Tanker Company's MV British Dominion, one of a 14-strong convoy en route to Malta from the West Indies.

About 300 nautical miles (560 km) southwest of Madeira, the convoy in which Hawkins was serving was attacked. Hit by three torpedoes from U-522, the British Dominion caught fire almost immediately. The blaze was so fierce and the fear of explosion so great that, before the lifeboats could be launched, the order was given for the crew to abandon ship.

Many crew members jumped overboard. In the terrible confusion that followed, Hawkins, with great coolness and courage, managed to gather together a group of about nine men and keep them clear of the burning oil. He twice swam away from his companions to go to the assistance of other survivors who were in difficulty, encouraging them and swimming back with them to the group. The burning oil was still spreading and, as one of the Royal Navy escorts began to pick up survivors, Hawkins, still helping to pull his companions to safety, was badly burned on the face.

For his great courage in saving life at sea, Hawkins was awarded the Albert medal in bronze, which he received from King George VI at Buckingham Palace on 16 November 1943. He later also received the Lloyds medal for bravery at sea.

== Rugby career ==
Hawkins won 6-caps for Wales between 1949, and 1953 while at Salford and the Rochdale Hornets.
