= Fernande Bayetto =

French alpine skier (1928–2015)

Personal information
- Full name: Fernande Léontine Bayetto
- Nationality: French
- Born: 9 October 1928; Saint-Gervais-les-Bains, France
- Died: 7 November 2015 (aged 87); Bonneville, France

Sport
- Sport: Alpine skiing

Fernande Bayetto (9 October 1928 – 7 November 2015) was a French alpine skier who competed in the 1948 Winter Olympics.
