= Henri Rivière (bobsleigh) =

French bobsledder

Personal information
- Full name: Henri Joseph Rivière
- Nationality: French
- Born: 16 January 1922; Coublevie, France
- Died: 20 June 1989 (aged 67); Bron, France

Sport
- Sport: Bobsleigh

Henri Joseph Rivière (16 January 1922 – 20 June 1989) was a French bobsledder who competed in the 1950s. At the 1952 Winter Olympics in Oslo, he finished fifth in the two-man and 11th in the four-man events.
