= Henri Thiolière =

French ski jumper

Henri Thiolière (March 29, 1922 – September 29, 2012) was a French ski jumper who competed in the early 1950s. He finished 43rd in the individual large hill event at the 1952 Winter Olympics in Oslo.
