= Margareta Arvay =

Romanian cross-country skier (born 1937)

Personal information
- Nationality: Romanian
- Born: 1 October 1937 (age 87); Sinersig, Romania

Sport
- Sport: Cross-country skiing

Margareta Arvay (born 1 October 1937) is a Romanian cross-country skier. She competed in the women's 10 kilometres at the 1956 Winter Olympics.
