= Dagny Jørgensen =

Norwegian alpine skier

Dagny Jørgensen (born 22 March 1929) is a Norwegian alpine skier. She was born in Asker, represented Asker SK, and is the sister of Inger Jørgensen. She participated at the 1952 Winter Olympics in Oslo, where she competed in downhill and giant slalom.
