= André Robin =

French bobsledder

Personal information
- Full name: André Marius Robin
- Nationality: French
- Born: 10 October 1922; Beaumont-Monteux, France
- Died: 4 June 2007 (aged 84); Coublevie, France

Sport
- Sport: Bobsleigh

André Marius Robin (10 October 1922 – 4 June 2007) was a French bobsledder who competed in the 1950s. Competing in two Winter Olympics, he earned his best finish of fifth in the two-man event at Oslo in 1952 Winter Olympics. In the four-man event he finished eleventh.

Four years later he finished 18th in the four-man event at the 1956 Winter Olympics.
