= Benoît Carrara =

French cross-country skier (1926–1993)

Personal information
- Nationality: French
- Born: 7 May 1926; Oltre il Colle, Italy
- Died: 28 February 1993 (aged 66); Hauteville, France

Sport
- Sport: Cross-country skiing

Benoît Carrara (7 May 1926 – 28 February 1993) was a French cross-country skier who competed in the late 1940s and early 1950s. He finished 77th in the 18 km event and 11th in the 50 km event at the 1952 Winter Olympics in Oslo. He also competed at the 1948 Winter Olympics, 1956 Winter Olympics and the 1960 Winter Olympics. He was born in Hauteville-Lompnes.
