= Alfred Byrd Graf =

German-American botanist (1901-2001)

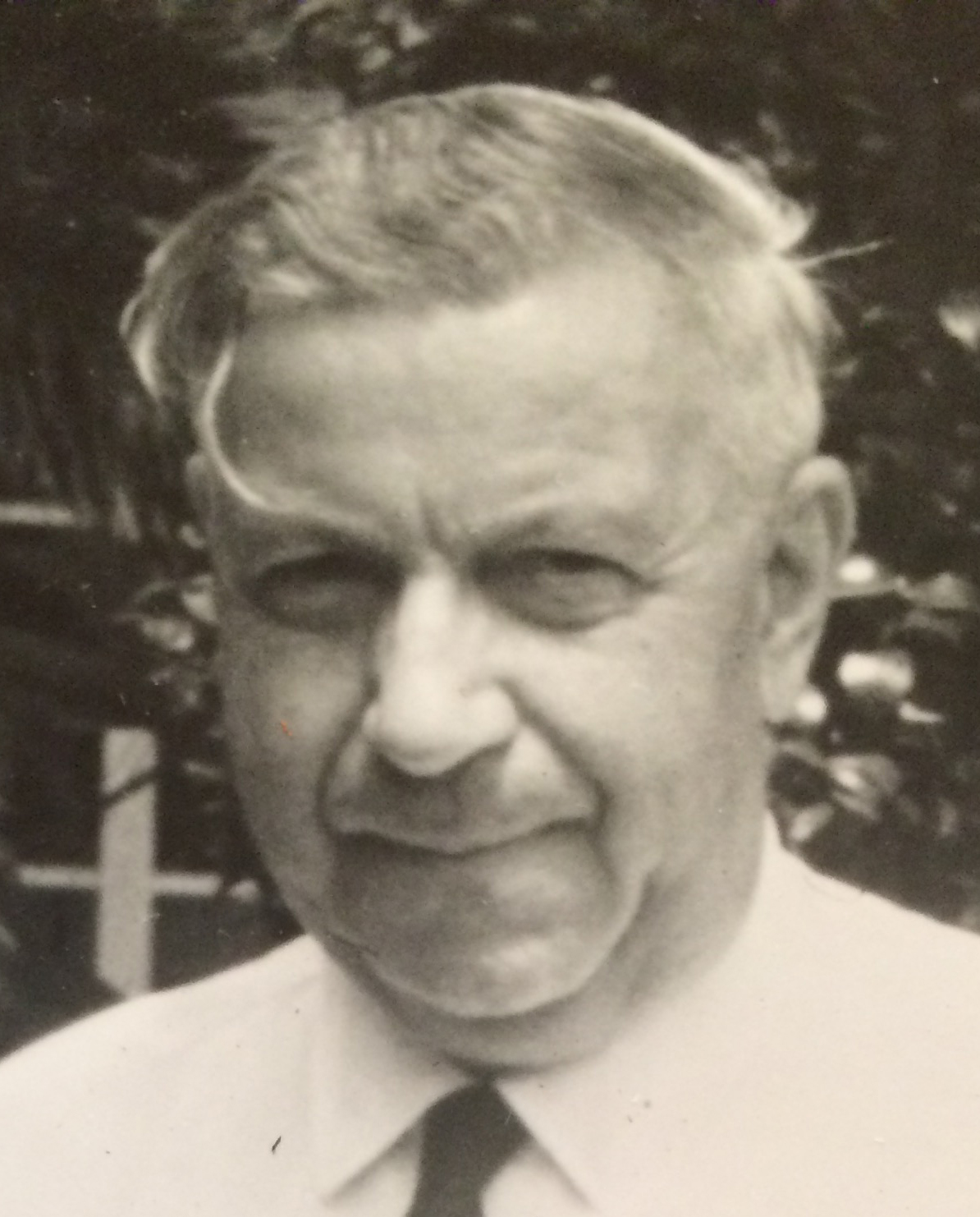
- Portrait of Alfred Byrd Graf 1967
- Born: November 23, 1901; Nuremberg, Germany
- Died: December 14, 2001 (aged 100); Düsseldorf, Germany
- Occupation: Botanist
- Spouse: Lieselotte Vorwerk
- Children: Doris

Alfred Byrd Graf (November 23, 1901 – December 14, 2001) was a German-American botanist who traveled the world in search of obscure plant species, discovering more than 100 previously undocumented varieties. He photographed and documented his findings in a number of richly illustrated (and correspondingly expensive) books he wrote on the subject.

Graf was born in Nuremberg on November 23, 1901, and studied at botanic gardens in Vienna and took courses in botany, photography and language throughout Europe, in California and at Fairleigh Dickinson University.

He came to work on a ranch in Nebraska in the 1920s, and later established a floral shop in Sioux City, Iowa that failed after his greenhouse was demolished as the result of a hailstorm. He found a position in 1931 with the Julius Roehrs Company, a tropical nursery in New Jersey, where his experience growing orchids in his youth in Germany helped him tap into what was becoming a major field of interest in the U.S. With his position at Roehrs, his travels allowed him to bring back new species that the company could add to its catalog, which morphed into book form as the Exotic Plant Manual, complete with 7,000 photos.

Graf's writings were based on firsthand research done on travels around the world, having visited sites of plants that could be found on Mount Kilimanjaro, in New Guinea and throughout China, India and much of Asia, uncovering scores of previously undocumented species which he introduced to Western plant aficionados and carefully documented with his camera. Among his findings were the first known white African Violet.

His books typically included thousands of his photographs and were priced accordingly. Roehrs Publishing released Exotica: Pictorial Cyclopedia of Indoor Plants in 1958 with in excess of 4,000 mostly black and white images, a guide to imported plants and the steps needed to grow them, his first book to receive widespread attention. The book was re-released in two volumes, with 16,000 illustrations decorating its 2,600 pages. Tropica, first published in 1978, covered plants from the areas in and around the tropics and included 7,000 full-color images. First published in 1992, Hortica: Color Cyclopedia of Garden Flora and Exotic Plants Indoors covers thousands of ornamental plants.

He maintained a library of his photographs and travels at his home in East Rutherford, New Jersey. Graf died at the age of 100 on December 14, 2001, at his home in Düsseldorf, Germany, having returned there after living the majority of his life in the United States. He was survived by his wife Lieselotte Vorwerk, as well as by a daughter Doris.

== Awards ==
- Dr. h. c. - Honorary degree Doctor honoris causa conferred by Fairleigh Dickinson University, Rutherford, New Jersey
- Tercentenary Medallion from Gov. Rich Hughes of the State of New Jersey
- Citation Award from the American Society for Horticultural Science
- Large Gold Medal from the New Jersey State Florists Association
- Large Gold Medal from the Massachusetts Horticultural Society in Boston
- Distinguished Service Award from the Horticultural Society of New York
- Certificate of Merit from the Pennsylvania Horticultural Society in Philadelphia
- Award of Merit and Silver Medal from the New York Florists Club
- Sarah Chapman Francis Medal from the Garden Clubs of America
- Induction into the Floriculture Hall of Fame by the Society of American Florists
- Florida Hall of Fame Award by the Foliage Association in Orlando
- Liberty Hyde Bailey Medal from the American Horticultural Society 1979
