= Tatsuo Watanabe =

Japanese ski jumper

Tatsuo Watanabe (渡部 龍雄, Watanabe Tatsuo) (April 4, 1928 – December 11, 2001) was a Japanese ski jumper who competed in the early 1950s. He finished 27th in the individual large hill event at the 1952 Winter Olympics in Oslo.
