= Josette Baisse =

French cross-country skier (1924–2023)

Josette Marie Laure Baisse (née Michelet, 11 September 1924 – 13 July 2023) was a French cross-country skier during the 1950s. She finished 15th in the 10 km event at the 1952 Winter Olympics in Oslo.

Baisse died on 13 July 2023, at the age of 98.

== Cross-country skiing results ==
=== Olympic Games ===
Year	Age	10 km
1952	27	15
