= Joseph Chatelus =

French bobsledder

Personal information
- Nationality: French
- Born: 2 December 1908; Lyon, France
- Died: 31 March 1979 (aged 70); Lyon, France

Sport
- Sport: Bobsleigh

Joseph Chatelus (2 December 1908 – 31 March 1979) was a French bobsledder who competed in the early 1950s. At the 1952 Winter Olympics in Oslo, he finished 11th in the four-man event and 17th in the two-man events.
