= Arnold Dyrdahl =

Norwegian bobsledder (1919–1973)

Arnold Dyrdahl (July 14, 1919 – October 21, 1973) was a Norwegian bobsledder who competed from the late 1940s to the late 1950s. Competing in two Winter Olympics, he earned his best finish of tenth in the four-man event at St. Moritz in 1948.

He was born in Byåsen and died in Trondheim.
