= Guy de Huertas =

French alpine skier (1926–1997)

Personal information
- Full name: Guy Edouard de Huertas
- Nationality: French
- Born: 10 January 1926 Paris, France
- Died: 2 March 1997 (aged 71) Paris, France

Sport
- Sport: Alpine skiing

Guy Edouard de Huertas (10 January 1926 – 2 March 1997) was a French alpine skier who competed in the 1948 Winter Olympics and in the 1952 Winter Olympics.
