= Biserka Vodenlič =

Croatian cross-country skier (born 1935)

Personal information
- Nationality: Croatian
- Born: 18 March 1935 (age 90); Delnice, Yugoslavia

Sport
- Sport: Cross-country skiing

Biserka Vodenlič (born 18 March 1935) is a Croatian cross-country skier. She competed in the women's 10 kilometres and the women's 3 × 5 kilometre relay events at the 1956 Winter Olympics, representing Yugoslavia.
