= Štefan Robač =

Slovenian cross-country skier

Personal information
- Nationality: Slovenian
- Born: 27 July 1931 (age 93); Ravne na Koroškem, Yugoslavia

Sport
- Sport: Cross-country skiing

Štefan Robač (born 27 July 1931) is a Slovenian cross-country skier. He competed in the men's 30 kilometre event at the 1956 Winter Olympics.
