= Mara Rekar =

Slovenian cross-country skier

Personal information
- Nationality: Slovenian
- Born: 8 May 1937 (age 88) Mojstrana, Yugoslavia

Sport
- Sport: Cross-country skiing

Mara Rekar (born 8 May 1937) is a Slovenian cross-country skier. She competed in the women's 10 kilometres at the 1956 Winter Olympics, representing Yugoslavia.

== Cross-country skiing results ==
=== Olympic Games ===
Year	Age	10 km	3 × 5 km relay
1956	18	33	—

=== World Championships ===
Year	Age	10 km	3 × 5 km relay
1958	20	30	—
