= Michèle Angirany =

French cross-country skier (1925–2021)

Personal information
- Nationality: French
- Born: 9 April 1925 Lyon, France
- Died: 5 March 2021 (aged 95) Viriat, France

Sport
- Sport: Alpine skiing

Michèle Angirany (April 9, 1925 – 5 March 2021) was a French cross-country skier during the 1950s. She finished 18th in the 10 km event at the 1952 Winter Olympics in Oslo.

== Cross-country skiing results ==
=== Olympic Games ===
Year	Age	10 km
1952	26	18
