= Lia Leismüller =

German alpine skier (1931–2001)

Personal information
- Born: 29 March 1931; Partenkirchen, Germany
- Died: 6 December 2001 (aged 70); Garmisch-Partenkirchen, Germany

Sport
- Sport: Alpine skiing
- Club: SC Partenkirchen

Lia Leismüller (29 March 1931 – 6 December 2001) was a German alpine skier for the winter sports club SC Partenkirchen. In 1950, she became the German champion in slalom skiing and subsequently in downhill skiing. In 1952, Leismüller competed in the women's downhill at the 1952 Winter Olympics, where she placed 35th.
