= Kauko Paananen =

Finnish equestrian

Personal information
- Nationality: Finnish
- Born: 7 October 1924; Kuopio, Finland
- Died: 20 December 2001 (aged 77)

Sport
- Sport: Equestrian

Kauko Paananen (7 October 1924 – 20 December 2001) was a Finnish equestrian. He competed in two events at the 1956 Summer Olympics.
