= Tine Mulej =

Slovenian alpine skier (1921–1982)

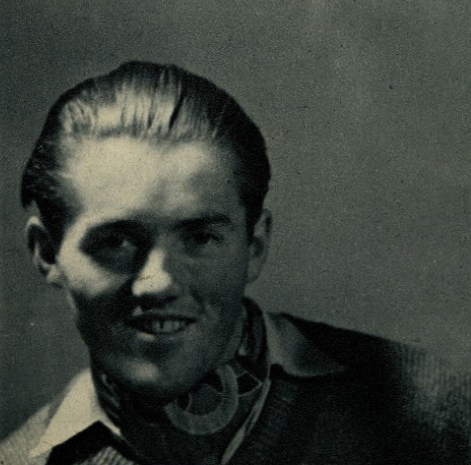

Personal information
- Nationality: Slovenian
- Born: 21 January 1921 Lesce, Yugoslavia
- Died: 9 April 1982 (aged 61) Begunje na Gorenjskem, Yugoslavia

Sport
- Sport: Alpine skiing

Tine Mulej (21 January 1921 – 9 April 1982) was a Slovenian alpine skier. He competed at the 1948 Winter Olympics and the 1952 Winter Olympics, representing Yugoslavia.
