= Rakel Wahl =

Norwegian cross-country skier

Rakel Wahl (March 18, 1921 – December 14, 2005) was a Norwegian cross-country skier who competed in the 1950s. She finished sixth in the 10 km event at the 1952 Winter Olympics in Oslo.

== Cross-country skiing results ==
All results are sourced from the International Ski Federation (FIS).

=== Olympic Games ===
Year	Age	10 km	4 × 5 km relay
1952	31	6	—N/a
1956	35	11	4

=== World Championships ===
Year	Age	10 km	3 × 5 km relay
1954	33	21	4
1958	37	23	7
