= Thomas Favors =

American baseball player

- Outfielder
- Born: December 29, 1920; Atlanta, Georgia, U.S.
- Died: December 11, 2001 (aged 80); Atlanta, Georgia, U.S.
- Batted: Left Threw: Left

Negro league baseball debut
- 1947, for the Kansas City Monarchs

Last appearance
- 1947, for the Kansas City Monarchs
- Stats at Baseball Reference

Teams
- Kansas City Monarchs (1947)

Thomas Favors (December 29, 1920 – December 11, 2001), nicknamed "Monk", was an American Negro league outfielder in the 1940s.

A native of Atlanta, Georgia, Favors attended Clark College, and served in the US Army during World War II. He played for the Kansas City Monarchs in 1947. In his six recorded games, he posted five hits and three walks in 26 plate appearances. Favors died in Atlanta in 2001 at age 80.
