= Mariya Dimova (skier) =

Bulgarian cross-country skier (born 1929)

Personal information
- Nationality: Bulgarian
- Born: 12 August 1929

Sport
- Sport: Cross-country skiing

Mariya Dimova (born 12 August 1929) was a Bulgarian cross-country skier. She competed in the women's 10 kilometres at the 1956 Winter Olympics.
