= Janko Štefe =

Slovenian alpine skier (1923–2002)

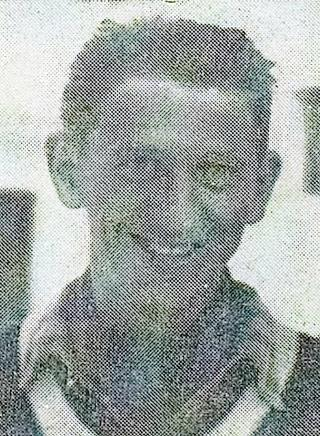

Personal information
- Full name: Janež Štefe
- Nationality: Slovenian
- Born: 26 January 1923; Tržič, Yugoslavia
- Died: 2002

Sport
- Sport: Alpine skiing

Janko Štefe (26 January 1923 – 2002) was a Slovenian alpine skier. He competed in three events at the 1952 Winter Olympics, representing Yugoslavia.
