= Scheiblingkirchen-Thernberg =

- Municipality
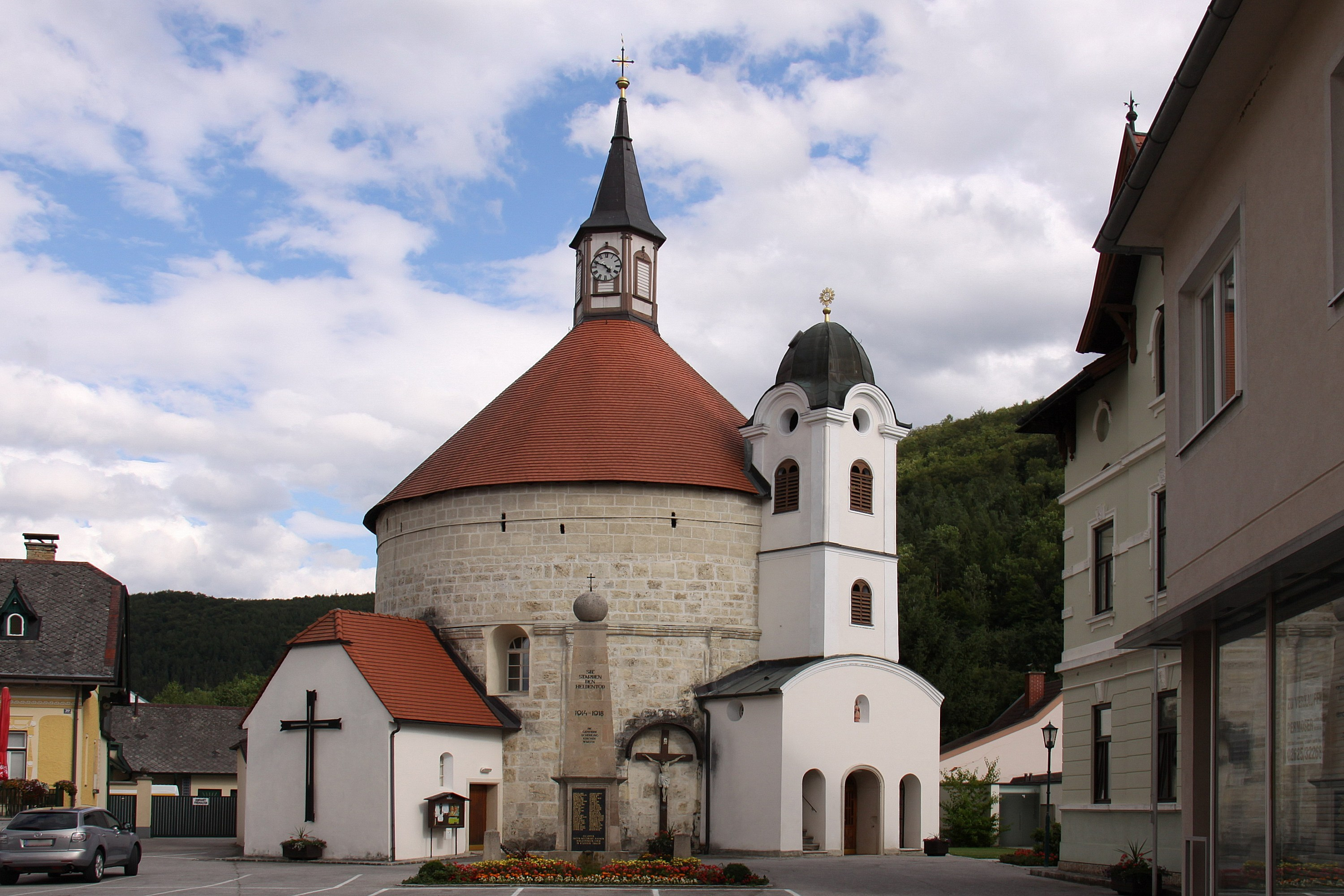
- Scheiblingkirchen parish church

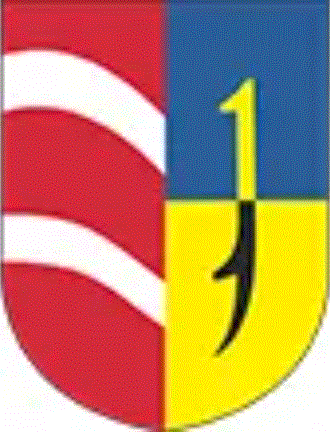
- Coat of arms

- Location within Austria
- Coordinates: 47°39′N 16°8′E
- Country: Austria
- State: Lower Austria
- District: Neunkirchen

Government
  - Mayor: Johann Lindner (ÖVP)

Area
  - Total: 37.83 km^{2} (14.61 sq mi)
- Elevation: 373 m (1,224 ft)

Population (2018-01-01)
  - Total: 1,864
  - Density: 49.27/km^{2} (127.6/sq mi)
- Time zone: UTC+1 (CET)
  - Summer (DST): UTC+2 (CEST)
- Postal code: 2831
- Area code: 02629
- Website: www.scheiblingkirchen.at

Scheiblingkirchen-Thernberg is a town in the district of Neunkirchen in the Austrian state of Lower Austria.

== Geography ==
Scheiblingkirchen-Thernberg is located in the Industrieviertel of Lower Austria. The area of the market town is 37.84 km^{2} (14.61 mi^{2}), of which 64.35% is forested.

== Population and Demographics ==
Historical population
Year	Pop.	±%
1869	1,642	—
1880	1,706	+3.9%
1890	1,658	−2.8%
1900	1,661	+0.2%
1910	1,787	+7.6%
1923	1,867	+4.5%
1934	1,711	−8.4%
1939	1,643	−4.0%
1951	1,670	+1.6%
1961	1,604	−4.0%
1971	1,655	+3.2%
1981	1,767	+6.8%
1991	1,842	+4.2%
2001	1,821	−1.1%
2011	1,900	+4.3%

According to the 2001 Census, 92.7% of the population is Roman-Catholic, 1% is Evangelical, 0.3% is Muslim, 0.1% is Orthodox, and 4.8% does not belong to a religious denomination.
