= Per Olsen (cross-country skier) =

Norwegian cross-country skier

Per Olsen (13 June 1932 – 9 November 2013) was a Norwegian cross-country skier.

He participated at the 1956 Winter Olympics in Cortina d'Ampezzo, where he placed fourth in the 4 × 10 km relay together with Håkon Brusveen, Martin Stokken and Hallgeir Brenden.

He was born in Alta Municipality in Finnmark county. He represented Alta IF. He is the father-in-law of Anette Tønsberg.

== Cross-country skiing results ==
=== Olympic Games ===
Year	Age	15 km	30 km	50 km	4 × 10 km relay
1956	23	—	19	—	4

=== World Championships ===
Year	Age	15 km	30 km	50 km	4 × 10 km relay
1954	21	42	—	—	—
1958	25	—	15	DNF	—
