= Andrée Bermond =

French alpine skier (1929–2010)

Personal information
- Full name: Andrée Julia Claret-Tournier
- Nationality: French
- Born: 30 March 1929; Albertville, France
- Died: 19 September 2010 (aged 81); Chamonix-Mont-Blanc, France

Sport
- Sport: Alpine skiing

Andrée Bermond (30 March 1929 – 19 September 2010) was a French alpine skier. She competed in three events at the 1952 Winter Olympics.
