= Kjelfrid Brusveen =

Norwegian cross-country skier

Personal information
- Nationality: Norwegian
- Born: 23 November 1926 Fåberg, Norway
- Died: 3 January 2009 (aged 82) Lillehammer, Norway

Sport
- Sport: Cross-country skiing

Kjelfrid Brusveen (23 November 1926 – 3 January 2009) was a Norwegian cross-country skier.

She was born in Fåberg Municipality, and represented Faaberg IL. She competed at the 1956 Winter Olympics in Cortina d'Ampezzo, where she placed 10th in the 10 kilometres, and fourth in the 3 × 5 km relay with the Norwegian team.

== Cross-country skiing results ==
=== Olympic Games ===
Year	Age	10 km	3 × 5 km relay
1956	29	10	4
