= Knut Tangen =

Norwegian speed skater

Knut Håkon Tangen (21 May 1928 – 2 April 2007 in Hurdalssjøen) is a Norwegian speed skater. He competed at the 1956 Winter Olympics, where he placed 19th in the 10,000 metre.
