= Arne Røgden =

Norwegian bobsledder

Arne Røgden (16 May 1917 - 1 January 2002) was a Norwegian bobsledder who competed during the 1950s. Competing in two Winter Olympics, he earned his best finish of 11th in the four-man event at Cortina d'Ampezzo in 1956.

He was born in Oslo and died in Bærum.
