= Marysette Agnel =

French alpine skier (1926–1958)

Personal information
- Nationality: French
- Born: 28 August 1926; Chamonix, France
- Died: 19 July 1958 (aged 31); Courmayeur, Italy

Sport
- Sport: Alpine skiing

Marysette Agnel (28 August 1926 – 19 July 1958) was a French alpine skier. She competed at the 1952 Winter Olympics and the 1956 Winter Olympics.
