= Jacqueline Martel (alpine skier) =

French alpine skier (1927–2015)

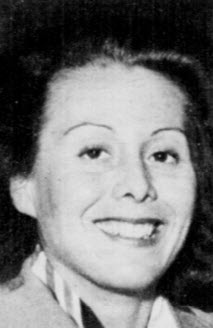

Personal information
- Full name: Jacqueline Georgette Dumoulin
- Nationality: French
- Born: 11 January 1927 Annecy, France
- Died: 11 January 2015 (aged 88) Saint-Gervais-les-Bains, France

Sport
- Sport: Alpine skiing

Jacqueline Martel (11 January 1927 – 11 January 2015) was a French alpine skier. She competed in two events at the 1952 Winter Olympics.
