= Nada Birko =

Croatian and Yugoslav cross-country skier (1931–2020)

Nada Birko (2 January 1931 – 1 September 2020) was a Croatian cross-country skier who competed for Yugoslavia during the 1950s. She finished 14th in the 10 km event at the 1952 Winter Olympics in Oslo. She was born in Mrkopalj, and died in Zagreb, aged 90. At the time of her death she was the oldest Croatian Olympian.
