= Lunn =

Lunn is a surname, and may refer to:

- Agnes Cathinka Wilhelmine Lunn (1850–1941), Danish artist
- Arnold Lunn (1888–1974), British mountaineer
- Austin Lunn, American musician and songwriter
- Bert Lunn (1926–1996), New Zealand rugby union player
- Billy Lunn (footballer) (1923–2000), Northern Ireland
- Bob Lunn (born 1945), American golfer
- Brian Lunn (1893–1956), British writer
- David Lunn (1930–2021), English bishop
- David Lunn-Rockliffe (1924–2011), British businessman
- Elizabeth Teter Lunn (1904–1998), American biologist
- Enoch Lunn, English footballer
- Fred Lunn (1895–1972), English footballer
- Gary Lunn (born 1957), Canadian politician
- George Lunn (UK politician) (1861–1939)
- George R. Lunn (1873–1948), American clergyman and politician
- Gladys Lunn (1908–1988), English athlete
- Halvor Skramstad Lunn (born 1980), Norwegian snowboarder
- Harry Lunn, Canadian football player
- Henry Charles Lunn (1817–1894), editor of The Musical Times
- Henry Lunn (1859–1939), English businessman and Methodist
- Hugh Lunn (born 1941), Australian journalist
- Hugh Kingsmill, full name Hugh Kingsmill Lunn (1889–1949), British writer
- Janet Lunn (1928–2017), Canadian juvenile writer
- Joanne Lunn, British singer
- John Lunn (born 1956), British composer
- John Robert Lunn (1831–1899), English organist and clergyman
- Joseph Lunn (1784–1863), English dramatist
- Karen Lunn (born 1966), Australian golfer
- Laurence Lunn (1896–1946), English footballer
- Louise Kirkby Lunn (1873–1930), English singer
- Maggie Lunn (1961–2017), English casting director
- Mardi Lunn (born 1968), Australian golfer
- Peter Lunn (1914–2011), British alpine skier
- Robert Lunn, American football player
- Roy Lunn (1925–2017), automotive industry engineer
- Tommy Lunn (1883–1960), English footballer
- Trevor Lunn, politician in Northern Ireland
- Wilf Lunn (born 1942), English inventor and TV presenter
- William Lunn (1872–1942), British politician

== See also ==
- Lunn Island, island of Papua New Guinea
- Sally Lunn bun, a type of large bun
- 3208 Lunn, asteroid
