= Polytechnic Touring Association =

Defunct British travel agency

The Polytechnic Touring Association was a travel agency which emerged from the efforts of the Regent Street Polytechnic (now University of Westminster) to arrange UK and foreign holidays for students and members of that institution. The PTA became an independent company – though still with close links to the Polytechnic – in 1911. Later it changed its name to Poly Travel, before being acquired in 1962 along with the firm Sir Henry Lunn Ltd. A few years later, the two firms were merged and eventually rebranded as Lunn Poly (and later on as Thomson Holidays). The PTA was one of a number of British travel agencies formed in the latter part of the 19th century, following on from the pioneering efforts of Thomas Cook.

== History ==
Members of the Polytechnic had taken holidays at the homes of its founder, Quintin Hogg (1845-1903), including Holly Hill in Hampshire, but increasing numbers meant that this became impractical. In 1886 trips for members were arranged to Switzerland and Boulogne. In 1888 a party of boys from the Polytechnic School toured Belgium and Switzerland to see the mountains they were learning about in geography lessons. In 1889 arrangements were made for Polytechnic parties to visit the Paris Exhibition. In subsequent years, the tours were opened up to those who were neither students nor members of the Polytechnic. Cruises to Norway began in 1892.

In 1894 the Director of Education Robert Mitchell (1855-1933) acquired chalets by Lake Lucerne which were to become the most famous centre for the Polytechnic Touring Association. A notable achievement was the organisation of a series of trips to Chicago to see the World's Fair in 1893: more than 1,000 people made the month-long journey. By 1894 the Continental tours had more than 3,000 participants, increasing to 12,000 by 1903. The steam yacht "Ceylon" was purchased in 1896 for cruises of the Norwegian fjords. Polytechnic employees acted as guides. However, in 1896-97, the travel firm Thomas Cook and Son sent several complaints to the Department for Education regarding the tours being subsidised by governmental grants.

The name 'Polytechnic Touring Association' emerged around the year 1900, although its organisation was still within the Polytechnic. Its trips claimed to pioneer cheaper travel, making it accessible to less affluent middle-class and lower middle-class travellers. Its office was adjacent to the main entrance of the Regent Street Polytechnic building. The tours were initially organised within the general administration of the Polytechnic, though after the Scheme of Administration in 1891, there was pressure from the auditors to separate out the accounts and administration. Robert Mitchell remained the driving force until after World War One.

The continued expansion of the firm after 1918 was due largely to the leadership of Commander Ronald G Studd: when he left the Navy in 1921 his father, Sir Kynaston Studd, President of the Polytechnic, invited him to take over the management of the tours. He did this very successfully, expanding the range of tours to include southern Europe but continuing to focus on Switzerland as the primary PTA destination. Kynaston Studd was PTA chairman until his death in 1944; Ronald Studd, as well as being PTA Managing Director, was on the Polytechnic Board of Governors. The PTA offices remained on Polytechnic premises until 1950 and the agency made annual donations to the Polytechnic to support its work.

When the Creative Tourist Agents Conference was formed, Ronald Studd became chairman; he was also the first vice-chairman of ABTA when it was created in 1950. In 1962 Poly Travel (as it had been renamed in 1958) was acquired by Harold Bamberg, who also acquired the firm of Henry Lunn Ltd and eventually merged the firms to form the travel retailer Lunn Poly (rebranded as Thomson Holidays in 2005).

== Sources ==
- "Polytechnic Touring Association - University of Westminster › Records and Archives".
- Dominici, Sara (2015). "Tourist Photographers and the Promotion of Travel: The Polytechnic Touring Association, 1888–1939" (PDF). Photography and Culture. 8 (3): 297–323. doi:10.1080/17514517.2015.1091178. S2CID 194975592.
