= Lugn =

Swedish surname

Lugn is a Swedish surname. Notable people with the surname include:

- Kristina Lugn (1948–2020), Swedish poet and dramatist
- Robert Lugn (1923–2016), Swedish Army officer

== See also ==
- Lunn
