= Peter Lunn =

British alpine skier (1914–2011)

Personal information
- Full name: Peter Northcote Lunn
- Born: 15 November 1914 Coventry, England
- Died: 30 November 2011 (aged 97) Worthing, Sussex

Sport
- Sport: Skiing

Peter Northcote Lunn (15 November 1914 – 30 November 2011) was a British alpine skier who competed in the 1936 Winter Olympics. As a spymaster in the early Cold War, he was noted for his resourceful use of telephone tapping.

== Biography ==
The son of Arnold Lunn and Mabel Stafford Northcote (1889-1959), granddaughter of the 1st Earl of Iddesleigh. He was born in Coventry and educated at Eton.

Shortly before his second birthday in 1916, Lunn's father introduced him to skiing at Mürren, which was the Lunn family's winter home. "I remember endlessly walking up the practice slope, skiing over a large bump and falling over," Lunn said at the age of 95. "My mother picked me up and said, 'Lean forward' – rather good advice." During the 1930s, Lunn was one of Britain's leading skiers. He was a member of the British international ski team from 1931 to 1937, and its captain from 1934 to 1937. At the 1936 Winter Olympics at Garmisch-Partenkirchen, he led the British ski team and finished twelfth in the alpine skiing combined event, the highest British placing. "I was overawed by the event and skied too carefully," he said later. "It was the only major international downhill race in which I failed to fall." Lunn and his father, who refereed the slalom in the 1936 Winter Olympics, detested every form of totalitarianism. Neither marched in the opening procession or attended the lavish banquet given by the Nazis.

As well as two skiing manuals and The Guinness Book of Skiing, Lunn also wrote Evil in High Places, a thriller with a skiing background.

On 24 April 1939, Lunn married the Hon. Eileen Antoinette Mary Preston (1912–1976), the daughter of Jenico Edward Joseph Preston, 15th Viscount Gormanston (1879–1925). They had three sons and three daughters.

Espionage writer Richard C. S. Trahair provides this description of Lunn: "He had a slight build and blue eyes, spoke in a soft voice with a lisp, and appeared to be a quiet gentle fellow. However benign his appearance, he was a forceful man of strong will, hardworking, a devout Roman Catholic, and militant anti-Communist."

In 1939 Peter Lunn entered government service, and in 1941 he joined the Secret Intelligence Service (SIS). A Royal Artillery officer, he was seconded to MI6 and supervised secret operations for 30 years. He worked in Malta (1939–1944), Italy (1944–1945), West Germany (1945–1946), London (1946–1948), Vienna (1948–1950), Bern (1950–1953), Berlin (1953–1956), London again (1956–1957), Bonn (1957–1962), Beirut (1962–1967), and London for a third time (1967–1968). Wherever he went, Lunn seized every opportunity to ski. "We had four weeks in Mürren every Christmas," his son Stephen recalled. "He skied every day from 8.30 am to 4.30 pm, and he was furious if he went a day without a big fall, because that meant he wasn't trying hard enough."

As head of the SIS station in Vienna, Lunn discovered that beneath the French and British sectors, there were telephone cables that linked field units and airports of the Russian Army to Soviet headquarters. He got expert advice on tapping these lines, and a private mining consultant agreed to construct a tunnel from the basement of a police post to the main phone cable between the Soviet headquarters in the Imperial Hotel and the Russian military airfield at Schwechat. Operation Silver, conceived by Lunn, was the first Cold War tunnel operation. It garnered a rich trove of message traffic from 1948 to 1951 and was a forerunner for the more ambitious Berlin Tunnel a few years later.

In 1954 Lunn was SIS head of station in Berlin, and cooperated with his CIA opposite number William King Harvey to bring about work on the Berlin Tunnel (known as Operation Gold by the Americans and Operation Stopwatch by the British). The operation was codenamed PBJOINTLY, with the P and B standing for Peter and Bill respectively. Most of the manpower and funds were provided by the Americans, while the technical skills and experience from the Vienna tunnel came from Lunn's officers. Unknown to either the SIS or the CIA, the tunnel was revealed to the Soviets from the beginning by George Blake, who worked for SIS on the project. In the event, the KGB was quite happy to let the West snoop on the Red Army, and did not use the tapped lines for disinformation, as that could have led to Blake's exposure. A full account of the operation from a British perspective is given by espionage writer David A. T. Stafford in his book Spies Beneath Berlin (2002).

In 1963 Beirut, Lunn was given the job of questioning the traitor Kim Philby. A few days later Philby vanished, only to turn up on board a Soviet ship. The government file on Lunn is witheld and its number redacted.

Lunn retired from government service in 1986. In 2008, at a centenary dinner, he became an honorary member of the Alpine Ski Club, which his father Arnold Lunn had founded 100 years earlier.

He was predeceased by a son and a daughter.

- Speed Skiing (1935)
- Evil in High Places (1947)
- A Ski-ing Primer (1948)
- The Guinness Book of Skiing (1983)
