= The Innocent (1993 film) =

1993 British-German film

- Theatrical release poster
- Directed by: John Schlesinger
- Written by: Ian McEwan
- Based on: The Innocent by Ian McEwan
- Produced by: Norma Heyman; Wieland Schulz-Keil; Chris Sievernich
- Starring: Anthony Hopkins; Isabella Rossellini; Campbell Scott
- Cinematography: Dietrich Lohmann
- Edited by: Richard Marden
- Music by: Gerald Gouriet
- Distributed by: Jugendfilm-Verleih (Germany); Entertainment Film Distributors (United Kingdom); Miramax Films (United States)
- Release dates: 16 September 1993 (Germany); 24 June 1994 (United Kingdom); 1 September 1995 (United States)
- Running time: 107 minutes
- Country: Germany
- Language: English
- Box office: $525,955 (USA)

The Innocent is a 1993 drama film directed by John Schlesinger. The screenplay was written by Ian McEwan and based on his 1990 novel of the same name. The film stars Anthony Hopkins, Isabella Rossellini, and Campbell Scott. It was released in the US in 1995.

== Plot ==
The film takes place in 1950s Berlin at the height of the Cold War and centres around the joint CIA/MI6 real-life Operation Gold: building a tunnel under the Russian sector of Berlin.

== Cast ==
- Anthony Hopkins as Bob Glass
- Isabella Rossellini as Maria
- Campbell Scott as Leonard Markham
- Ronald Nitschke as Otto
- Hart Bochner as Russell
- James Grant as Macnamee
- Jeremy Sinden as Captain Lofting
- Richard Durden as Black
- Corey Johnson as Lou
- Richard Good as Piper

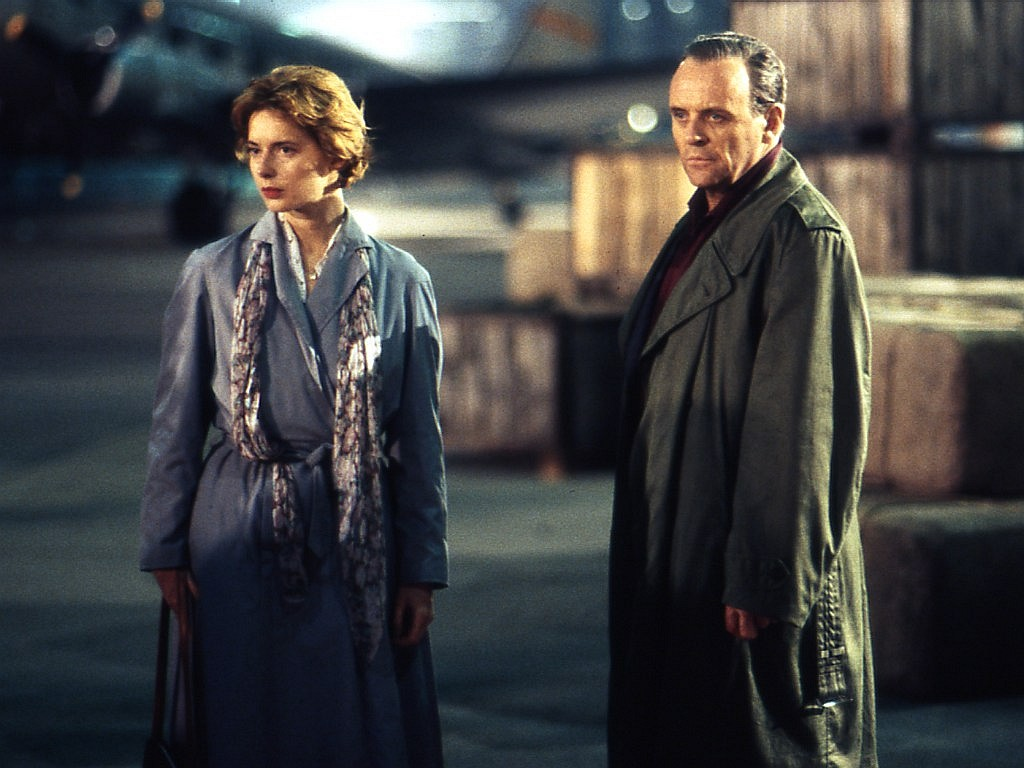
Rossellini and Hopkins on location at Berlin Tempelhof Airport

== Releases ==
The film had a double world premiere in Berlin in English and German on 16 September 1993. It opened on 4 screens in the United Kingdom on 24 June 1994. The movie was then withdrawn from circulation and held in studio quarantine, eventually receiving a limited theatrical release in the United States in September 1995 without advance screenings for critics.

== Reception ==
=== Critical response ===
On the review aggregator website Rotten Tomatoes, 22% of 9 critics' reviews are positive, with an average rating of 4.8/10. Reviewing its 1993 German premiere, Rebecca Lieb of Variety wrote that the film "rings hollow... lacks real drama... [and] fails to build tension or suspense." When the film released two years later in the United States, The New York Times' film critic Caryn James felt that it "eventually overcomes its obstacles and almost lives up to its promising pedigree.... a tense and suspenseful love story with Hitchcockian overtones", while Rita Kempley, in The Washington Post, called the movie "baffling... [T]he acting proves as inconsistent as Schlesinger's ability to build and release suspense."

=== Box office ===
During its limited release opening weekend in the United Kingdom on 24 June 1994, The Innocent grossed UK£15,436. In its limited theatrical release in the United States 15 months later, it grossed US$525,955.
