= Operation Silver (1949) =

British intelligence operation in occupied Austria

Operation Silver was a British intelligence operation in Allied-occupied Austria which ran from 1949 to 1955. It covertly tapped into the landline communications of the Soviet Army headquarters in Vienna. The operation's staff included Peter Lunn, Peter Montagnon, Major John Edward Wyke of the SIS, and telecommunication specialists from the BPO Research Station at Dollis Hill in London.

Several tunnels were used with lengths 1.8 m to 21 m (6 ft to 70 ft). The largest (Schwechat) tunnel was from Wyke’s villa in the Schwechat suburb. Although the operation was considered a success, the details of it were passed on to the KGB in October 1953 by George Blake, a British double agent. The British monitoring station was disguised as a shop which sold tweed clothing. The operation ended only when Austria regained full sovereignty in 1955.

In 1951, when the American CIA planned a similar operation in Berlin, the British revealed Operation Silver to the Americans and the two countries then jointly ran Operation Gold, an operation to tap into landline communication of the Soviet Army headquarters in Berlin using a tunnel going into the Soviet-occupied zone. Blake had also informed the Soviet authorities about Operation Gold in its very beginning, and they "discovered" the tunnel in 1956. The KGB had kept the operation secret to avoid compromising Blake.

== See also ==
- Operation Gold - a more complex phone tapping operation in post World War II Berlin against the Soviets
