= Operation Gold =

US/UK intelligence-gathering operation

Coordinates: 52°24′44″N 13°31′42″E

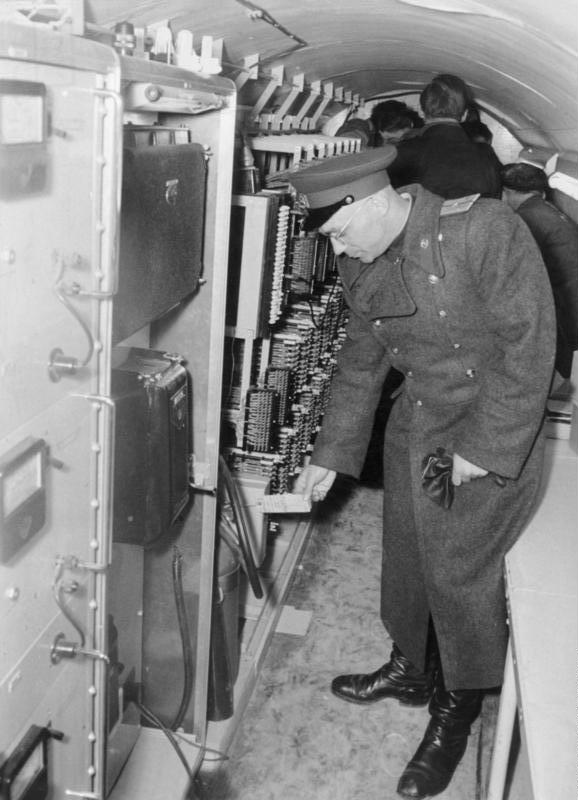
Soviet officer inside the tunnel

Operation Gold (also known as Operation Stopwatch by the British) was a joint operation conducted by the American Central Intelligence Agency (CIA) and the British MI6 Secret Intelligence Service (SIS) in the 1950s to tap into landline communication of the Soviet Army headquarters in Berlin using a tunnel into the Soviet-occupied zone. This was a much more complex variation of the earlier Operation Silver project in Vienna.

The plan was activated in 1954 because of fears that the Soviets might be launching a nuclear attack at any time, having already detonated a hydrogen bomb in August 1953 as part of the Soviet atomic bomb project. Construction of the tunnel began in September 1954 and was completed in eight months. The Americans wanted to hear any warlike intentions being discussed by their military and were able to listen to telephone conversations for nearly a year, eventually recording roughly 90,000 communications.

The Soviet authorities were informed about Operation Gold from the very beginning by their mole George Blake but decided not to "discover" the tunnel until April 21, 1956, in order to protect Blake from exposure.

Some details of the project are still classified, and whatever authoritative information could be found was scant until recently. This was primarily because the then-Director of Central Intelligence (DCI), Allen Dulles, had ordered "as little as possible" to be "reduced to writing" when the project was authorized. In 2019, additional specifics became available.

== Background ==
After the Red Army followed the Soviet diplomatic department and transferred its most secure communications from radio to telephone landlines, the post-World War II Western Allies lost a major Cold War source of information. Operation Gold was hence at least the third tunnel built to aid intelligence in the Cold War period after the end of World War II. From 1948 onwards, under Operation Silver, the British SIS had undertaken a number of such operations in then still occupied-Vienna, the information from which enabled the restoration of Austrian sovereignty in 1955. The KGB later commissioned the Red Army to construct a tunnel to tap into a cable that served the major US Army garrison in Berlin.

== Operational agreement ==
In early 1951, the CIA undertook an assessment process for replacing lost Soviet radio communications intelligence. Revealing their plans to the British, the SIS, having read the report, which included the idea of tapping Soviet telephone lines, revealed the existence of Operation Silver in Vienna.

On the reassignment of CIA agent Bill Harvey to Berlin to explore available options, Reinhard Gehlen, the head of the Bundesnachrichtendienst, alerted the CIA to the location of a crucial telephone junction, less than 2 meters (6 ft. 7 in.) underground, where three cables came together close to the border of the American sector of West Berlin. Operation Gold was planned jointly by the SIS and the CIA. Initial planning meetings were held at No. 2 Carlton Gardens, London, from which the West German government was excluded due to the "highly infiltrated nature" of their service. The resulting agreement was that the US would supply most of the financing and construct the tunnel (as the closest access point was in their sector), while the British would use their expertise from Operation Silver to tap the cables and provide the required electronic communications equipment.

One of those who attended the early meetings was George Blake, a mole in the British intelligence apparatus. Blake apparently alerted the KGB immediately, as two of Gehlen's agents were caught trying to get a potential tapping wire across a Berlin canal. The KGB decided to let Operation Gold proceed since, in order to attack the tunnel, the Soviets would have to compromise Blake, and they found it preferable to sacrifice some information rather than their valuable agent. According to the author of a 2019 book about the operation, the Soviets "valued Blake so much that they feared his exposure more than a breach of their secrets."

The KGB did not inform anyone in Germany, including the East Germans or the Soviet users of the cables, about the taps. According to a CIA report, "there were no known attempts to feed disinformation to the CIA." Although the British SIS suspected the opposite, the CIA report states that "the Soviet military continued to use the cables for communications of intelligence value."

== Construction ==
In December 1953, the operation was placed under the direction of William King Harvey, a former U.S. Federal Bureau of Investigation (FBI) official who transferred to the CIA. Captain Williamson of the United States Army Corps of Engineers was placed in charge of construction.

The first project was the construction of a "warehouse", which acted as a disguise and had an US Army ELINT (radar) station above it. The warehouse, in the Neukölln/Rudow district of the US sector of Berlin, had an unconventionally deep basement at 7 metres (23 ft) to serve as the staging area for the tunnel and to house the soil removed from the tunnel. Digging the initial vertical shaft for the tunnel began on September 2, 1954, and was completed on February 25, the following year.

The covert construction of the 450-meter (1,476 ft) tunnel under the world's most heavily patrolled border to intersect a series of cables less than 47 centimeters (19 in.) below a busy street was an exceptional engineering challenge. Using the shield method of construction, which pushed forward on hydraulic rams, the resultant space was lined with sand and 1,700 cast-iron lining plates. A wooden railway track acted as a guide for the rubber-wheeled construction vehicles, which by the end of construction had removed 3,000 tons (3,000 long tons and 3,300 short tons) of material. This included a number of evacuations, including when the diggers broke through into an undocumented pre-World War II cesspool and flooded the tunnel. Throughout the construction and in operational use, the entire tunnel was rigged with explosives, designed to ensure its complete destruction (although the explosives were not used; US Army Major General Charles Dasher "would not approve an action which could be the start of World War III").

Once complete, the tunnel ran into the Altglienicke area of Treptow borough, where British Army Captain Peter Lunn—a former Olympic alpine skier and the head of the SIS in Berlin supervised construction of the vertical shaft and the tapping of the three cables. Tunnelling was difficult with the need to avoid subsidence in the soft crumbly soil. For the vertical shaft work an improvised device called the Mole was used by the British team from the Royal Engineers and the SIS plus staff from the BPO Research Station at Dollis Hill. The tapping into the three cables was carried out by specialist BPO cable jointing staff; Scotsman Blake Rymer "the best jointer they had" plus Les Sparks and Arthur Loomes.

Originally costed at $50,000, the final cost of the completed tunnel was over US$6.5M (although many items were just "written off"), or equivalent to the final procurement cost of two Lockheed U-2 spy planes.

== Operation ==
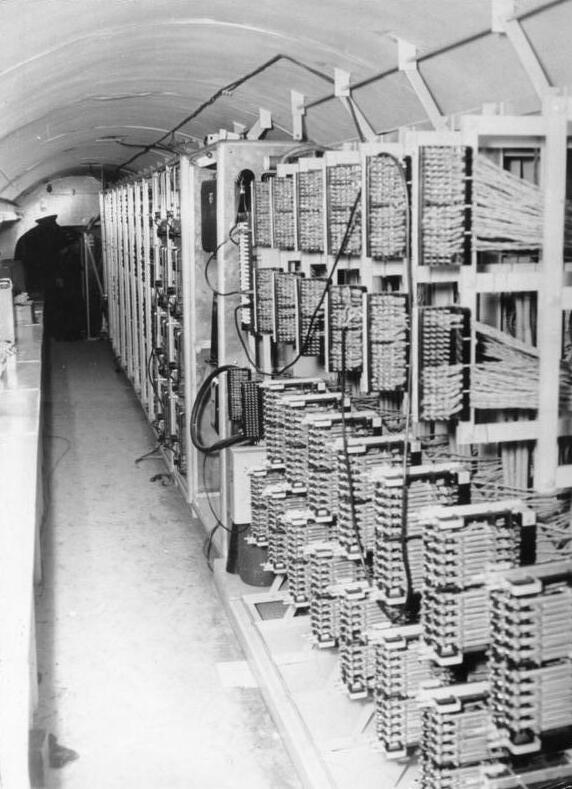
Wiretap/recording equipment which included American and British products

The tunnel ran 450 m (1,476 feet) and was 1.8 m (six feet) in diameter and operated for 11 months and 11 days according to a 2019 book by Washington Post journalist Steve Vogel, who reviewed all of the available documents and interviewed 40 of the project's participants. Betrayal in Berlin: The True Story of the Cold War's Most Audacious Espionage Operation includes a "virtually month-by-month account of the tunnel's excavation and operation", according to one review. As well, after that book was published, the CIA released a less redacted version of their documents about the tunnel.

Inside, the British and the Americans listened and recorded the messages flowing to and from Soviet military headquarters in Zossen, near Berlin: conversations between Moscow and the Soviet embassy in East Berlin and conversations between East German and Soviet officials.

The West was unable to break Soviet encryption at this time. Instead they took advantage of valuable intelligence gained "from unguarded telephone conversations over official channels." "Sixty-seven thousand hours of Russian and German conversations, were sent to London for transcription by a special section staffed by 317 Russian emigres and German linguists. Teleprinter signals, many of them multiplexed, were also collected on magnetic tape and forwarded to Frank Rowlett's Staff D for processing."

To protect Blake, the KGB was forced to keep the flow of information as normal as possible with the result that the tunnel was a bonanza of intelligence collection for the US and Britain in a world that had yet to witness the U-2 or satellite imagery.

According to Stephen Budiansky, "The KGB's own high-level communications went on a separate system of overhead lines that could not be tapped without its being obvious, and, concerned above all with protecting Blake as a valuable source inside SIS and unwilling to share its secrets with rival agencies, the KGB had simply left both the GRU and the Stasi in the dark about the tunnel's existence."

== Discovery by the Soviets ==
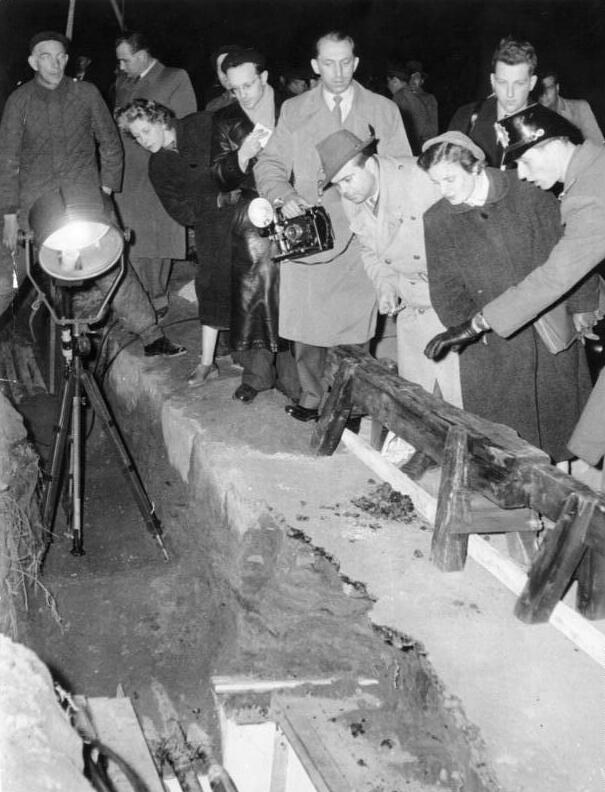
The tapped telephone wires are presented to the press.

When Blake received a transfer in 1955, the Soviets were free to "discover" the tunnel. On 21 April 1956, months after the tunnel went into operation, Soviet and East German soldiers broke into the eastern end of the tunnel. One source indicates that the wiretap had been in service for roughly 18 months. The Soviets announced the discovery to the press and called it a "breach of the norms of international law" and "a gangster act". Newspapers around the world ran photographs of the underground partition of the tunnel directly under the inter-German frontier. The wall had a sign in German and Russian reading "Entry is Forbidden by the Commanding General."

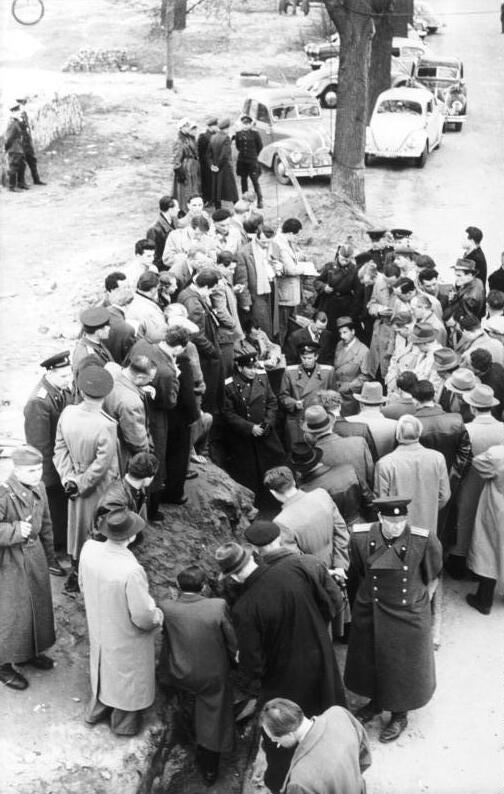
By 24 April 1956, the remains of the tunnel were being toured extensively by the Soviet and East German authorities.

In the planning phase, the CIA and SIS had estimated that the Soviets would cover up any discovery of the tunnel, through embarrassment and any potential repercussions. However, most world media portrayed the tunnel project as a brilliant piece of engineering. The CIA may have gained more than the Soviets did from the "discovery" of the tunnel. In part, this was because the tunnel was discovered during Soviet First Secretary Nikita Khrushchev's state visit to the United Kingdom, and specifically the day before a state banquet with HM Queen Elizabeth II at Windsor Castle. It is suspected that the Soviets and the British agreed to mute media coverage of British participation in the project even though the equipment shown in most photographs was British-built and clearly labelled as such.

Only in 1961, when Blake was arrested, tried and convicted, did Western officials realize that the tunnel had been compromised long before construction had begun. Although DCI Allen Dulles has publicly celebrated the success of Operation Gold in providing order of battle and other information about Soviet and East Bloc activities behind the Iron Curtain, a declassified NSA history implied that NSA may have thought less of the value of the tunnel collection than did the CIA.

In 1996 the Berlin city government contracted a local construction company to excavate approximately 83 meters (270 ft) from the former American Berlin sector of the tunnel to make way for a new housing development. In 1997 a 12-meter (40 ft) section was excavated under the guidance of William Durie from what had been the Soviet Berlin sector. This section of tunnel is displayed at the Allied Museum. The museum's claim that this section was retrieved from the American sector is false. The CIA museum received outer tunnel shell elements in 1999 and the International Spy Museum in Washington thereafter.

== In fiction ==
Operation Gold forms the background to the novels The Innocent by Ian McEwan, Voices Under Berlin: The Tale of a Monterey Mary by T. H. E. Hill and to the film The Innocent by John Schlesinger.
