= Alpine Ski Club =

The Alpine Ski Club (ASC) is a club of ski mountaineers based in the UK and the first ski mountaineering club in Great Britain.

Membership is open to experienced independent ski-mountaineers who fulfil the minimum entry qualification. Aspirant membership is open to those who do not meet the criteria.

== Notable Members (Honorary and Ordinary) Past and Present ==
- Sir Edmund Hillary
- Sir Chris Bonington
- Peter Lunn
- Frank Smythe
- Patrick Pery, 6th Earl of Limerick

== History ==
The ASC was created on Saturday the 7th of March 1908 at a dinner in the Devonshire Club hosted by Dr Henry Lunn (later to be Sir Henry Lunn). Founder members included:

- Sir Martin Conway (First President)
- Mr Arnold Lunn (later to be Sir Arnold Lunn)
- Mr William Moore
- Rev. Canon Savage
- Mr Willi Rickmer Rickmers
- Dr Tom Longstaff
- Mr E. V. S Caulfeild
- George Ingle Finch

Stephen Venables became the patron of the Alpine Ski Club in 2017.

== Activities ==
The club provides a venue for active ski-mountaineers to meet, exchange information and to plan new expeditions. It holds two lecture meetings every year in autumn and spring, usually at The Alpine Club and an annual dinner is usually held in November.

In addition to these UK-based activities, the ASC also organises meetings in the Alps as well as expeditions to little-known mountain ranges across the world. Enterprising guideless ski expeditions in recent years have included ski-mountaineering expeditions to Muztag Ata, Zanskar, Kashmir, Gangotri, Iran, Turkey and Svaneti. Recent Alpine meets have been in Pontresina, Andermatt, Briançon, Dolomites, Tatras, Lyngen, Stubai and Romania.

Avalanche rescue transceivers are available for hire to members of the Alpine Ski Club. This is provided as part of the ASC's commitment to safer ski mountaineering.

== Sponsorship and awards ==
The Alpine Ski Club has two award schemes, namely the Kenneth Smith Scholarship and the Memorial Adventure Fund.

These schemes can provide help for:

- Taking part in a ski mountaineering expedition which includes an element of exploration,
- Carrying out a research project on an aspect of ski mountaineering,
- Attending an approved course in ski mountaineering, or
- Other activities which further the knowledge and practice of safe movement in the mountains on ski.

The awards are especially, but not exclusively, for young skiers.

== See also ==
- Skiing
- Ski touring
- Ski mountaineering
- Telemark skiing
