= Hugh Kingsmill =

British writer and journalist (1889–1949)

Hugh Kingsmill Lunn (21 November 1889 – 15 May 1949) was a British writer and journalist. The writers Arnold Lunn and Brian Lunn were his brothers.

== Life ==
Hugh Kingsmill Lunn was born at Torrington Square, Bloomsbury, London, second son and second child of the three sons and one daughter of Sir Henry Simpson Lunn, founder of the travel agency Lunn Poly, and Mary Ethel, née Moore, daughter of a canon. He was educated at Harrow School and the University of Oxford. After graduating he worked for a brief period for Frank Harris, who edited the publication Hearth and Home in 1911/2, alongside Enid Bagnold; Kingsmill later wrote a debunking biography of Harris. He began fighting in the British Army in World War I in 1916, and was captured in France the next year. He was held as a prisoner of war at Mainz Citadel with, among others, J. Milton Hayes and Alec Waugh.

After the war he began to write, initially both science fiction and crime fiction. In the 1930s he was a contributor to the English Review; later he wrote a good deal of non-fiction for that periodical's successor, the English Review Magazine. His large output includes criticism, essays and biographies, parodies and humour, as well as novels, and he edited a number of anthologies. He is remembered for saying 'friends are God's apology for relations', with a notable flavour of Ambrose Bierce. The dictum was subsequently used by Richard Ingrams for the title of his memoir of Kingsmill's friendships with Hesketh Pearson and Malcolm Muggeridge, two intimate friends whom he influenced greatly.

Kingsmill was literary editor of Punch from 1942 to 1944 and of the New English Review from 1945 to 1949. He married Eileen FitzGerald in 1915 and there was one daughter. The marriage broke up in 1927. Kingsmill married a second time in 1934 to Dorothy Vernon, and there were two daughters and a son. (She also had one son of her own). He died of cancer in Brighton in 1949.

== Satire ==
Muggeridge drew a darker attitude from Kingsmill's sardonic wit. Dawnist was Kingsmill's word for those infected with unrealistic or utopian idealism – the enemy as far as he was concerned.

Kingsmill's parody of A. E. Housman's poetry has been recognised as definitive:

What still alive at twenty-two,
A clean, upstanding chap like you?
Sure, if your throat 'tis hard to slit,
Slit your girl's, and swing for it.

Like enough, you won't be glad,
When they come to hang you, lad:
But bacon's not the only thing
That's cured by hanging from a string.

So, when the spilt ink of the night
Spreads o'er the blotting-pad of light,
Lads whose job is still to do
Shall whet their knives, and think of you.

Housman himself said of this parody: "It's the best I have seen, and indeed, the only good one."

== Anthologist ==
Despite his wide range as a novelist, biographer, essayist, and literary critic, Kingsmill is best known today as an anthologist. He compiled at least eight of his humorous and original anthologies (depending on how they are classified) between 1929 and 1955. The first, An Anthology of Invective and Abuse, was by far the most successful and remains the best known. Oswald Mosley was so enthusiastic about it that he forwarded a copy to Adolf Hitler. According to Hesketh Pearson in his preface to High Hill of the Muses (the last of the anthologies) "Kingsmill himself became a little restless when people praised his volume of vituperation."

Michael Holroyd judges The Worst of Love (1931), a collection of insincere writing, to be the funniest. It resembles the better known anthology The Stuffed Owl, compiled by D. B. Wyndham Lewis and Charles Lee, which was published the year before. Owing to his wide reading and good memory, Kingsmill could put together an anthology inside a month, which helped him meet pressing financial commitments. Two other works, The English Genius (1938) and Johnson Without Boswell (1940), take on aspects of the anthology form but include more original content.

== Annotated list of works ==
- The Will To Love (1919). Novel written under the name "Hugh Lunn". The character Ralph Parker is based on Frank Harris and Barbara on Enid Bagnold.
- The Dawn's Delay (1924). Includes three short novels: 'W.J', 'The End of the World' and 'The Disintegration of a Politician'. Published at his own expense.
- Blondel (1927). Novel, begun in 1925. Set in the period of Richard Coeur de Lion but not a historical novel: it's based on a love affair Kingsmill had with an Irish cousin in his teens.
- Matthew Arnold (1928). Biography, written in an informal style (the subject referred to throughout as "Matt"). Contains "a disproportionate degree of censure".
- After Puritanism, 1850–1900 (1929). Four long essays on Dean Farrar, Samuel Butler, Frank Harris and W. T. Stead, linked by the idea that Puritanism did not fade away circa 1820 but remained alive during the Victorian era.
- An Anthology Of Invective And Abuse (1929). A collection of expressions of anger ranging from John Skelton to the war poet Geoffrey Howard (1889–1973). The most successful of his humorous and original anthologies.
- The Return of William Shakespeare (1929, revised 1948). Novel in which Shakespeare is brought back to life for six weeks in the year 1943, and is able to read what his critics have written about him and react. Creative literary criticism.
- Behind Both Lines (1930). Autobiographical. Entertaining and light-hearted war memoirs.
- More Invective (1930). Anthology. A sequel to An Anthology of Invective and Abuse. A combined volume was published in 1944.
- The Worst of Love (1931). Anthology collecting "numerous specimens of bad writing about love".
- Frank Harris (1932). Biography. Holroyd calls this "most skilfully written and put together", but it has also been accused of being "hostile" and "malicious".
- The Table of Truth (1933). Parodies originally published in The Bookman and The English Review. Includes P G Wodehouse and also the famous Housman parody (above).
- Samuel Johnson (1933). His best biography (Holroyd), although "his love of Johnson sometimes softened the edge of his normally acute criticisms".
- The Sentimental Journey (1934) Biography of Charles Dickens. Irked by G K Chesterton's portrayal of Dickens as a philanthropic and selfless social worker, Kingsmill's portrait is one of extreme and unrelieved severity. George Orwell described it as "the most brilliant ever written on Dickens", but "so unremittingly 'against' that it might give a misleading impression".
- The Casanova Fable: A Satirical Revaluation (1934) with William Gerhardi. Kingsmill wrote the first biographical section, this time arguing against Havelock Ellis's picture of Casanova as "a free spirit, a wit and bold thinker".
- What They Said at the Time (1935). Anthology.
- Parents and Children (1936). Anthology.
- Brave Old World (1936). Newspaper parodies, with Malcolm Muggeridge
- A Pre-View of Next Year's News (1937). More newspaper parodies, with Malcolm Muggeridge
- Skye High: The Record of a Tour Through Scotland in the Wake of the Samuel Johnson And James Boswell. (1937). The first of three conversational travelogues written in collaboration with Hesketh Pearson
- Made on Earth (1937). Anthology on marriage.
- The English Genius: a survey of the English achievement and character (1938) As editor. New essays by W. R. Inge, Hilaire Belloc, Hesketh Pearson, William Gerhardi, E .S. P. Haynes, Douglas Woodruff, Charles Petrie, J. F. C. Fuller, Alfred Noyes, Rose Macaulay, Brian Lunn, Rebecca West, K. Hare, T. W. Earp.
- D. H. Lawrence (1938). Kingsmill was unsympathetic to Lawrence. The biography's inadequacy "lies in Kingsmill's reluctance to linger for any length of time upon the positive nature and quality of Lawrence's genius".
- Courage (1939). Anthology.
- Johnson Without Boswell: A Contemporary Portrait of Samuel Johnson (editor) (1940). Presents a picture of Johnson from several contemporary sources outside of Boswell.
- The Fall (1940). Generally regarded as Kingsnill's most satisfactory novel, an account of marital incompatibility with some autobiographical elements.
- This Blessed Plot (1942) travelogue with Hesketh Pearson. A record of travel and conversations in England and Ireland.
- The Poisoned Crown (1944) Essays on genealogies containing studies of Elizabeth, Cromwell, Napoleon and Lincoln, prefixed by a closely written chapter on The Genealogy of Hitler' ("one of the most brilliant [chapters] that he ever wrote" – Holroyd).
- Talking of Dick Whittington (1947) travelogue, with Hesketh Pearson. One review suggested that they had invented the conversation travel book as a new art form.
- The Progress of a Biographer (1949). Collection of literary criticism written since 1944.
- The High Hill of the Muses (1955). Last completed anthology, published posthumously.
- The Genius of Carlyle. Biography (unfinished).
- The Best of Hugh Kingsmill: Selections from his Writings (1970) edited by Michael Holroyd.

== Sources ==
- H. Pearson and M. Muggeridge. About Kingsmill (1951)
- Hugh Kingsmill: A Critical Biography (1964) Michael Holroyd
