= Brian Lunn =

British writer

Brian Lunn (1893–1956) was a British writer and translator.

He was born in Bloomsbury, London, youngest of three sons (there being also a daughter) of Methodist parents Sir Henry Lunn (1859-1939) and Mary Ethel, née Moore, daughter of a canon. He had a somewhat Puritanical upbringing, his father, founder of Lunn's Travel agency that would become Lunn Poly, having strong religious beliefs which were in conflict with his talent as a businessman. Arnold Lunn and Hugh Kingsmill were his brothers. In the mid-1920s Lunn was living at 50 Manchester St, London, W1. He had married after her divorce Betty (Beatrix) Duncan daughter of Ellen Duncan Duncan (Ellie) Duncan, founder in 1907 of Dublin's United Arts Club and with her husband Jim were lifelong friends with Percy French and his family. Ellie and Jim later separated. They had two children, Bettie and Alan. Brian Lunn married a second time to his first wife's sister-in-law, Belinda Duncan a life-long friend of Joyce and Beckett.

Lunn most important work as a writer was 'Switchback', his autobiography published in 1948. Its highlight is Brian's description of a mental breakdown he had while serving in Mesopotamia in the 11th Black Watch. The onset of his breakdown was described as follows:

'Men and beasts passed through the haze, black outlines; a troop of mules with Indian driver was a stately silhouette; shambling after them a bucket-carrying menial with tousled turban and bedraggled shirt flapping round flexed knees was an immortal grotesque, raised above the plane of human need and anxiety. The Platonic Idea, as interpreted by Schopenhauer, the basis of art. Removed from all appeal to the will, the horrible was transmuted into the beautiful. He was, in fact, a sanitary man staggering back from a punishment fatigue; constantly in trouble, he would incur more fatigues, with stoppages of pay, staggering in the bog of inefficiency under implacable authority. '

'...I looked along the river banks - tents and incinerators, horses and mules, soldiers, native and European, a complex of endeavour in an enterprise as unreal as all the day-to-day needs and anxieties and discomforts, ambitions and humiliations of each individual, were real.'

'Unreal? The word came back to me as a sudden illumination. That was it, it was all a staged show.'

His other books include a biography of Martin Luther, an "autobiography" of Satan which he "collated" in collaboration with William Gerhardie, a travel guide to Belgium, and a history of the Rothschild family. "Salvation Dynasty" was Brian Lunn's account of the Salvation Army's founders.

== Books ==
- Silbermann by Jacques De Lacretelle, translator Brian Lunn (1923)
- Austria in Dissolution by Stephan Burian Von Rajecz, translator Brian Lunn (1925)
- Letters to Young Winter Sportsmen - Skiing, Skating and Curling (1927)
- From Serfdom to Bolshevism. The Memoirs of Baron N. Wrangel, 1847-1920, translators Brian and Beatrix Lunn (1927)
- The Reign of the House of Rothschild by Count Egon Caesar Corti, translators Brian and Beatrix Lunn (1928)
- The Life of Alfred Nobel by H. Schuck and R. Sohlman, translator Brian Lunn (1929)
- The Cabaret Up the Line by Roland Dorgelès, translators Brian Lunn and Alan Duncan (1930)
- The Woman with a Thousand Children by Clara Viebig, translator Brian Lunn (1930)
- Religious Essays: A Supplement to 'The Idea of the Holy' by Rudolf Otto, translator Brian Lunn (1931)
- The Memoirs Of Satan, William Gerhardi and Brian Lunn (1932)
- Martin Luther: the man and his God (1934)
- Salvation Dynasty: On William Booth and his family (1935). Lunn contributed the chapter on John Fisher and Hugh Latimer.
- The Great Tudors, ed. Katharine Garvin (1936)
- The Charm of Belgium (1939)
- Switchback: an autobiography (1948)
