= The Innocent (McEwan novel) =

1990 novel by Ian McEwan

- First edition (UK)
- Author: Ian McEwan
- Cover artist: Robin Cracknell
- Language: English
- Publisher: Jonathan Cape; Doubleday (US)
- Publication date: 1990
- Publication place: United Kingdom
- Media type: Hardcover
- Pages: 231
- ISBN: 0-224-02783-2

The Innocent is a 1990 novel by British writer Ian McEwan. It received positive reviews from book critics and is considered by some to be one of his best novels.

== Summary ==
The novel takes place in 1955–56 Berlin at the beginning of the Cold War and centres on the joint CIA/MI6 Operation Gold, to build a tunnel from the American sector of Berlin into the Russian sector to tap phone lines of the Soviet High Command. Leonard Marnham is a 25-year-old Englishman who sets up and repairs the tape recorders used in the tunnel. He falls in love with Maria Eckdorf, a 30-year-old divorced German. The story revolves around their relationship and Leonard's role in the operation.

== Plot ==
Leonard Marnham is "The Innocent" of the novel, a Post Office engineer who is employed by the Americans to install monitoring equipment in the tunnel they are building specifically to tap the Russians. The British and Americans view each other with distrust. Leonard is befriended by Bob Glass, an American obsessed with security.

The British are aware that the Americans are on the verge of a breakthrough with decoding, and are annoyed that they have not been a part of it. MacNamee, a scientist, insists that Leonard act as a spy for them, as he is in with the Americans. Leonard fails dismally in his role as spy.

Ironically, Leonard lives in an apartment above one occupied by a rather stuffy character named George Blake, who was a Soviet agent imprisoned in the 1960s, and who escaped from Wormwood Scrubs. The novel neatly intertwines fictional meetings between the two men, and one of Blake's most notorious betrayals is given a new slant by Leonard's foolhardy act.

At a bar with his new American colleagues Leonard meets a girl called Maria to whom he is 'innocent' due to having never had sex before. They become engaged but after their engagement party Maria's ex-husband Otto, a self-proclaimed war hero and alcoholic turns up and starts a very violent fight with the couple. While defending Maria Leonard is being badly beaten, Maria hits Otto with a blow to the head which subsequently kills him.

The couple, aware they cannot report this to the police as Otto was friends with the police, decide they have to dispose of the body. They cut Otto's corpse up and pack him into cases Leonard has taken from the tunnel. Leonard, exhausted and in shock, wanders through Berlin with the heavy cases trying to find somewhere to leave the body parts, but gives up and returns to his flat with them. While leaving his flat again with the cases the next day, he encounters Blake in the lift and claims the cases contain equipment from the US, to be used in the tunnel for the next twenty-four hours only after which it will go back to the USA. Then Leonard runs into Glass, who admonishes him for removing equipment from the workplace and forces him to return the cases to the tunnel, driving him there himself. Leonard deposits the cases in the tunnel, then betrays its existence to the Russians to avoid the actual content of the cases being discovered by his colleagues. (Though it turns out later that Blake had already betrayed the existence of the tunnel long before. Blake tells the Russians about the new equipment Leonard has, so the Russians break into their tunnel from their end with a view to seizing the equipment for their own use.)

Leonard and Maria's relationship seems about to fall apart due to the strain of dismembering Otto's body, and both appear relieved when Leonard decides to go back to England for a short time. Just as his plane is about to take off he sees Maria and Bob Glass together on the roof of the airport terminal. Convinced from this that they are having an affair Leonard decides it is over between Maria and himself, having already been suspicious of them for some time.

In a postscript, the novel then skips forward thirty-two years to them both in late middle age (Leonard now circa 57, Maria circa 62). Leonard has received a letter from Maria explaining that she was never unfaithful to him with Glass until after his failure to reply to her letters, from which she took it that things were over between herself and Leonard. Maria tells Leonard she later married Bob Glass in New York, moved to America, and bore three children by him, but that Glass has recently died of a heart attack. She reveals that Glass found out about Otto and helped cover for the killing, which was the true reason for their suspicious behaviour together. The novel ends with Leonard deciding to fly to America and pay a surprise visit on Maria at her home.

== Themes ==
Leonard becomes fatally embroiled in the life of his German girlfriend, Maria. He finds his life changed forever in the space of one evening. A virgin, he is introduced to the delights of sex by Maria, who is herself entranced by his innocent charm. She is not threatened by him and this is very important to her. However her past catches up with her one fateful night. The tunnel, loyalties, all become part of Leonard's desperate attempt to escape his deed. The novel unravels Leonard's "innocence" in a deceptively comic fashion: the young Englishman, bumbling along, out of his depth, enduring jokes and insults from the Americans, suddenly finds himself at the abyss of fear and terror, where betrayal becomes easy.

== Reception ==
The Innocent was acclaimed by book critics. Michael Wood of the London Review of Books discussed the Gothic literary mode and wrote that "McEwan’s great gift is for getting his characters onto this level of experience by the most casual means." Wood stated that the connection between Leonard's work and personal life gets too unsubtle, but praised the precision of McEwan's portrayal of emotion, billing the novel as "a haunting investigation into the varied and troubling possibilities of knowledge.” Joan Smith referred to the novel as "far and away McEwan's most mature work" and "an outstanding achievement".

A reviewer for Kirkus Reviews stated that The Innocent is as "skillful in design [and] execution" as previous McEwan works. A writer for Publishers Weekly argued, "Though its plot rivals any thriller in narrative tension, this novel is also a character study--of a young man coming of age in bizarre circumstances, and of differences in national character: the gentlemanly Brits, all decorum and civility; the brash, impatient Americans; the cynical Germans. McEwan's neat, tensile prose raises this book to the highest level of the genre.” George Stade of the New York Times Review of Books wrote that the different elements in the story material are well integrated, and said that the book establishes McEwan as "an acute psychologist of the ordinary mind". Anthony Burgess is a fan of the novel, writing that the "resonance twangs long after the reading".

Michiko Kakutani of The New York Times praised The Innocent as "powerful and disturbing", and called it "bone tight: every detail of every event works as a time bomb, waiting to go off, while every image seems to pay off in terms of plot, atmosphere or theme." Kakutani argued that “while these Grand Guignol events are hardly plausible by everyday standards of reality [...] Mr. McEwan's cool, perfectly controlled account of the macabre events lends [hardly plausible events] a kind of inexorable logic”. Richard Eder of Los Angeles Times wrote an unfavorable review, however. Although he praised McEwan's account of the building and installation of the communications tap as "taut and exciting", he said that the story of Leonard and Maria "gets out of hand" when her husband appears and that the ending, "after so much tension, [...] seems lackadaisical and routine. An epilogue, set years later, turns this routine ending into a 'happy' ending that is utterly banal". Eder concluded that the novel is entertaining but lacks feeling.

Roger Boylan of the Boston Review argued in 2006 that Leonard's relationship with his American boss and affair with Maria "are tense and dynamic relationships, masterfully unveiled, and the atmospherics are first-rate. The Berlin of McEwan’s novel is scented with the real thing, the diesel fumes and beery scents and the Wurstwagens and the bracing Berliner Luft, the air of Berlin.” In a 2014 article for The Irish Times, Eileen Battersby praised the novel as "an interesting study of distrust" and one of McEwan's three best books. Tina Jordan and Susan Ellingwood of The New York Times listed The Innocent in 2018 as one of McEwan's six noteworthy works.

== Film adaptation ==
McEwan also wrote the screenplay for the 1993 movie of the same name.
