= William Gerhardie =

English novelist and playwright (1895–1977)

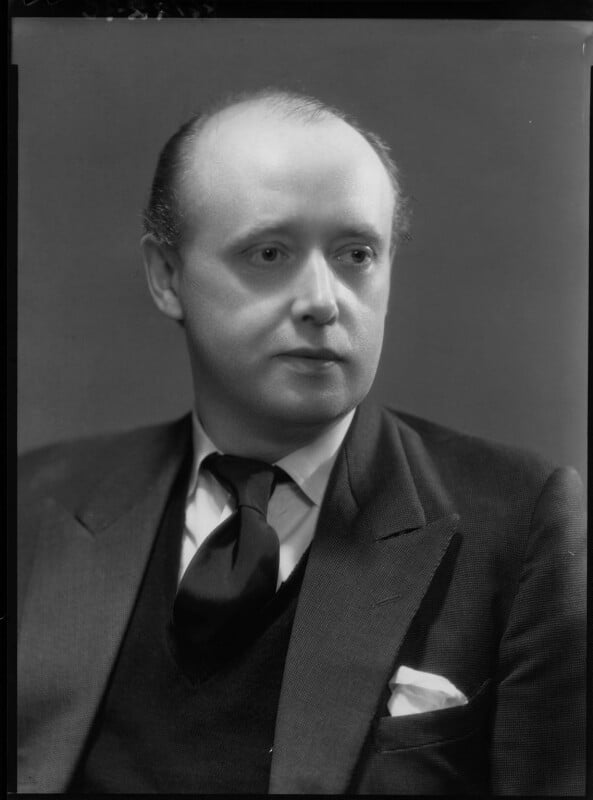
Gerhardie in 1939

William Alexander Gerhardie OBE FRSL (21 November 1895 – 15 July 1977) was an Anglo-Russian novelist and playwright. His first novel, Futility (1922), drew on his experiences of fighting the Bolsheviks in pre-revolutionary Russia.

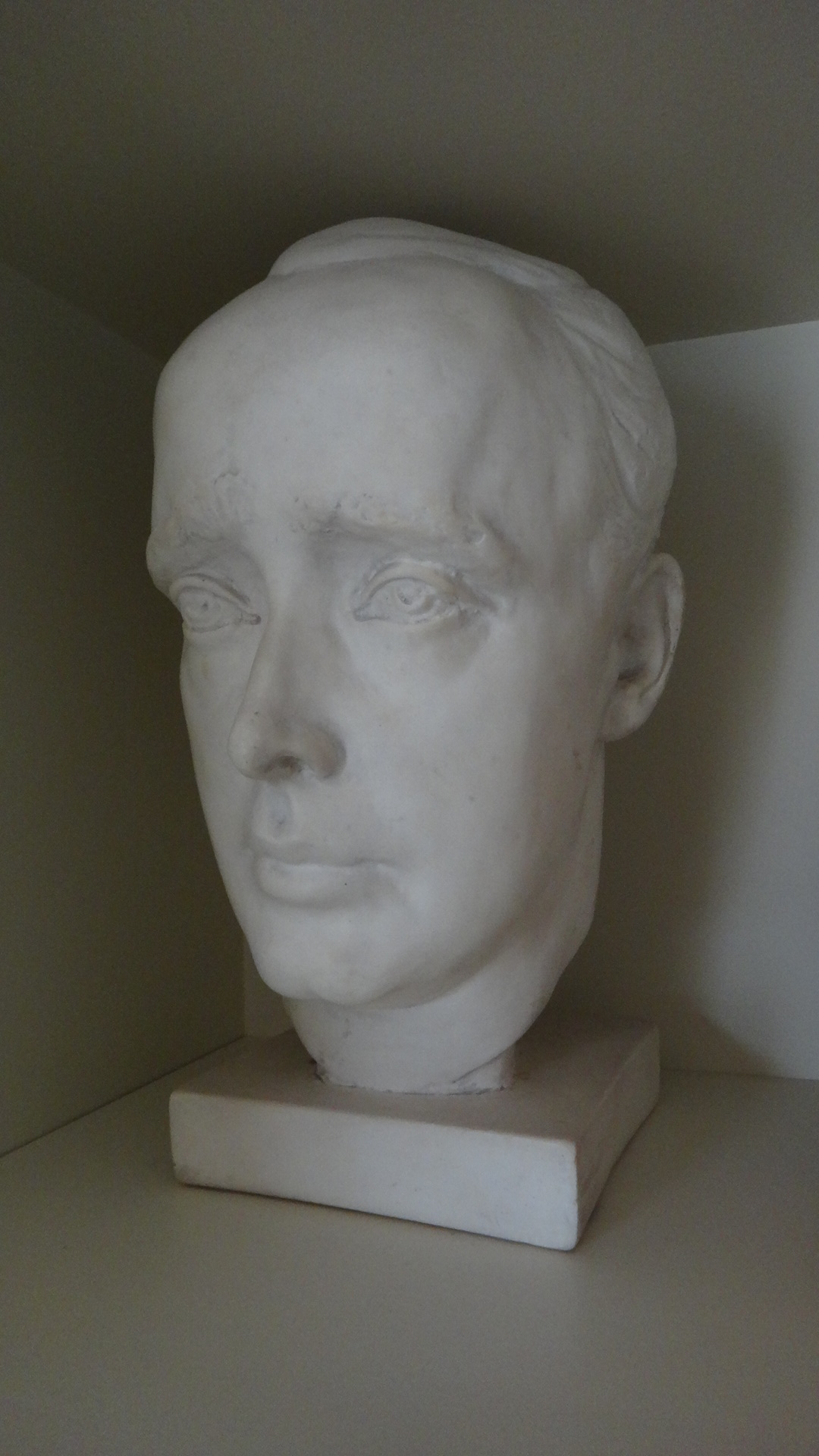
William Gerhardie by Norman Ivor Lancashire (1927–2004). Photograph by Stella Harpley

== Life and career ==
Gerhardie (or Gerhardi – he added the "e" in later years) was born at St Petersburg, Russia, the fifth of six children of Charles Alfred Gerhardi (1864–1925), a British expatriate industrialist, and his wife Clara Annie (1869–1948), daughter of John Wadsworth. He was educated at the Sankt Annenschule and Deutsche Reformierte Kirchenschule in St Petersburg, before completing his education in England at Worcester College, Oxford.

In 1915, during the First World War he enlisted in the Royal Scots Greys and trained in England while applying for a commission as an officer. After commissioning in 1916 he was posted to the staff of the British Military Attaché at Petrograd (as his birth city was then renamed) until 1918. During that period he witnessed the development of the 1917 Revolution which ruined his father who escaped Russia to exile in England having been allowed out through being identified with the (already dead) British socialist Keir Hardie.

During the Allied intervention in the Russian Civil War following the revolution he was attached to the 3rd Battalion of the Scots Guards and served on the British Military Mission to the White Russian forces in Siberia. He was demobilised with the rank of captain in 1920, having been mentioned in despatches, appointed an Officer of the Order of the British Empire (OBE), and awarded the Imperial Russian Order of St Stanislaus and the Czechoslovak War Cross.

Gerhardie was one of the most critically acclaimed English novelists of the 1920s (Evelyn Waugh told him, "I have talent, but you have genius.") H. G. Wells also championed his work. His first novel, Futility, was written while he was at Oxford University and drew on his experiences in Russia fighting (or attempting to fight) the Bolsheviks, along with his childhood experiences visiting pre-revolutionary Russia. In his preface to reissues of Gerhardie’s works, Michael Holroyd said that Futility was the first work in English to explore fully the theme of "waiting", later made famous by Samuel Beckett in Waiting for Godot, but it is probably more apt to recognize a common comic nihilism between those two figures. His next novel, The Polyglots, is probably his masterpiece (although some argue for Doom). Again it deals with Russia (Gerhardie was strongly influenced by the tragi-comic style of Russian writers such as Anton Chekhov, about whom he wrote a study while in college).

He collaborated with Hugh Kingsmill on the biography The Casanova Fable. Their friendship with Kingsmill was both a source of conflict over women and a great intellectual stimulus, providing material for the novel Pending Heaven.

In the Second World War, Gerhardie served in the Officers Emergency Reserve and from 1942 to 1945 he worked with the BBC in its European Division, where he was first editor of the "English by Radio" language programme.

After that war Gerhardie's star waned, and he became unfashionable. Although he continued to write, he published no new work after 1939. After a period of poverty-stricken oblivion, he lived to see two "definitive collected works" published by Macdonald in 1947–1949, revised in 1970–1974 with prefaces by Michael Holroyd who consistently championed his work. He was made a fellow of the Royal Society of Literature in 1975. After his death, an idiosyncratic study of world history between 1890 and 1940 was discovered among his papers, which was edited by Holroyd and Robert Skidelsky and published as God's Fifth Column. More recently, both Prion and New Directions Press have been reissuing his works.

Gerhardie never married. He lived the last 37 years of his life in the West End of London in increasing seclusion. He died at the Middlesex Hospital in June 1977 aged 81. After cremation his ashes were scattered in Regent's Park, at a gathering that included the writers Olivia Manning and J. G. Farrell.

Asked how to say his name, he told the Literary Digest it was "pronounced jer (as Ger in Gerald) hardy, with the accent on the a: jer-har'dy. This is the way I and my relatives pronounce it, though I am told it is incorrect. Philologists are of the opinion that it should be pronounced with the g as in Gertrude. I believe they are right. I, however, cling to the family habit of mispronouncing it. But I do so without obstinacy. If the world made it worth my while I would side with the multitude."

The contemporary British novelist William Boyd has identified Gerhardie, along with Cyril Connolly, as key inspirations for the central character (the writer Logan Mountstuart) in his 2002 novel Any Human Heart. A television adaptation was released in the UK in 2010, and in the US in 2011.

== Selected works ==
Novels

- 1922 Futility: A Novel on Russian Themes (London, Cobden Sanderson)
- 1925 The Polyglots (London, Cobden Sanderson)
- 1928 Jazz and Jasper (London, Duckworth); also published as Eva's Apples (New York, Duffield, 1928); later republished as My Sinful Earth (London, Macdonald, 1947); later republished as Doom (London, Macdonald, 1974)
- 1930 Pending Heaven (London, Duckworth)
- 1932 The Memoirs of Satan (With Brian Lunn) (London, Cassell)
- 1934 Resurrection (London, Cassell)
- 1936 Of Mortal Love (London, Barker)
- 1938 My Wife's the Least of It (London, Faber & Faber)

Short Stories

- 1926 A Bad End (London, Ernest Benn) - 43 page story.
- 1927 The Vanity Bag (London, Ernest Benn) - 59 page story.
- 1927 Pretty Creatures (London, Ernest Benn) - Short story collection, containing A Bad End and The Vanity Bag.

Drama

- 1927 Perfectly Scandalous or “The Immorality Lady” (London, Ernest Benn); later republished as Donna Quixote (London, Duckworth, 1929)

Non-Fiction

- 1923 Anton Chehov: a critical study (London, Cobden Sanderson) - Study of Anton Chekhov.
- 1931 Memoirs of a Polyglot: The Autobiography of William Gerhardie (London, Duckworth) - Autobiography.
- 1934 The Casanova Fable: A Satirical Revaluation (with Hugh Kingsmill) (London, Jarrold) - Study of Giacomo Casanova.
- 1936 Meet Yourself As You Really Are (with Prince Leopold Loewenstein) (London, Faber & Faber)
- 1939 The Romanovs (New York, Putnam’s) - Study of the Romanov Dynasty.
- 1981 God's Fifth Column: A Biography of the Age 1890–1940 (London, Hodder and Stoughton) - Posthumous; edited by Michael Holroyd and Robert Skidelsky.
