= Phrop =

Phrop is an attempted neologism for a polite statement in social contexts whose true meaning is the opposite of what is expressed. An example is "We must have lunch sometime", meaning "We don't particularly want to meet again". Phrop was coined in the late 1940s by the inventor of slalom skiing, Sir Arnold Lunn, and it won a competition of made-up words held by the New Statesman. It has not entered common usage.

== See also ==
- Antiphrasis
- Autantonym
- Euphemism
