= Berlin Operations Base =

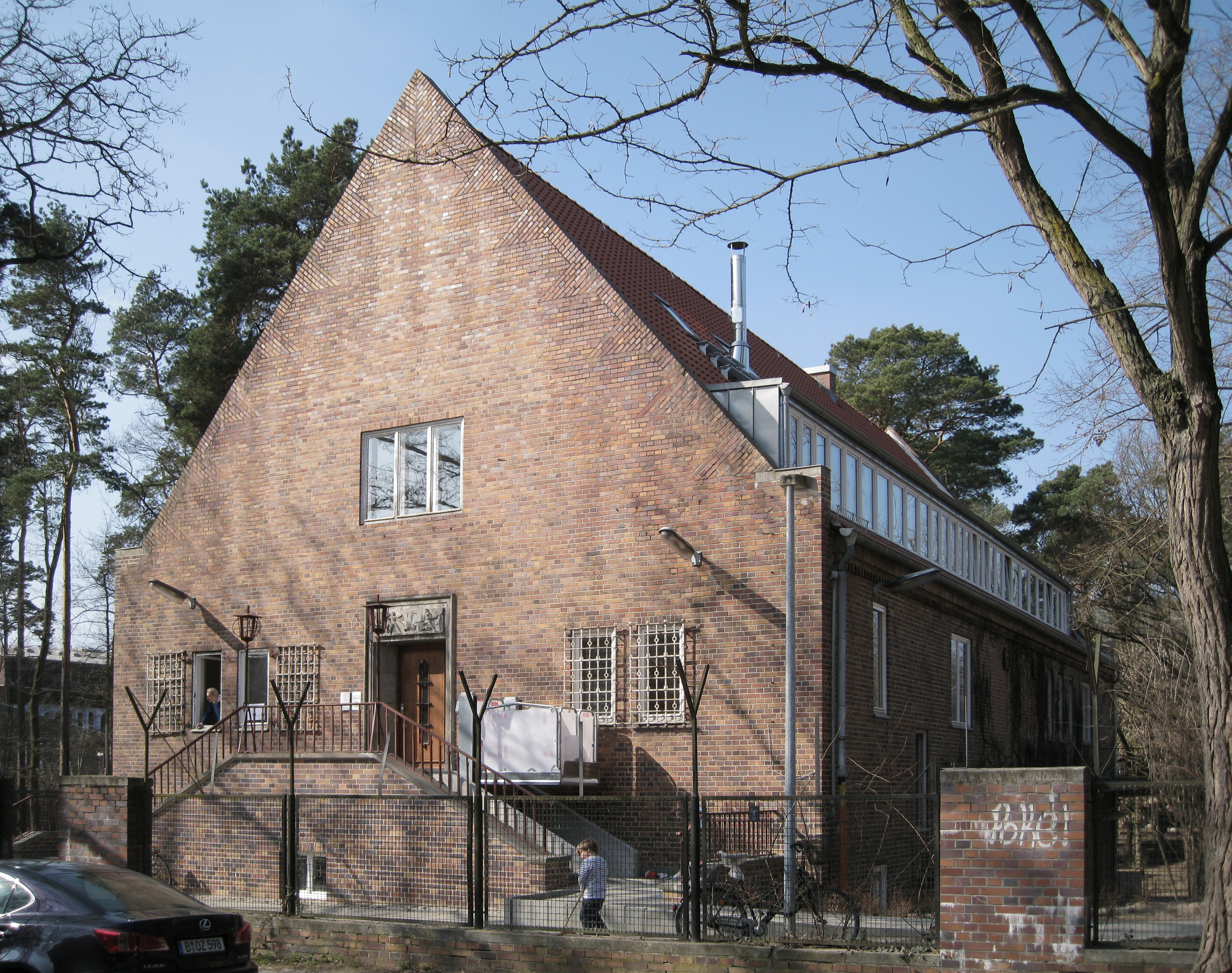
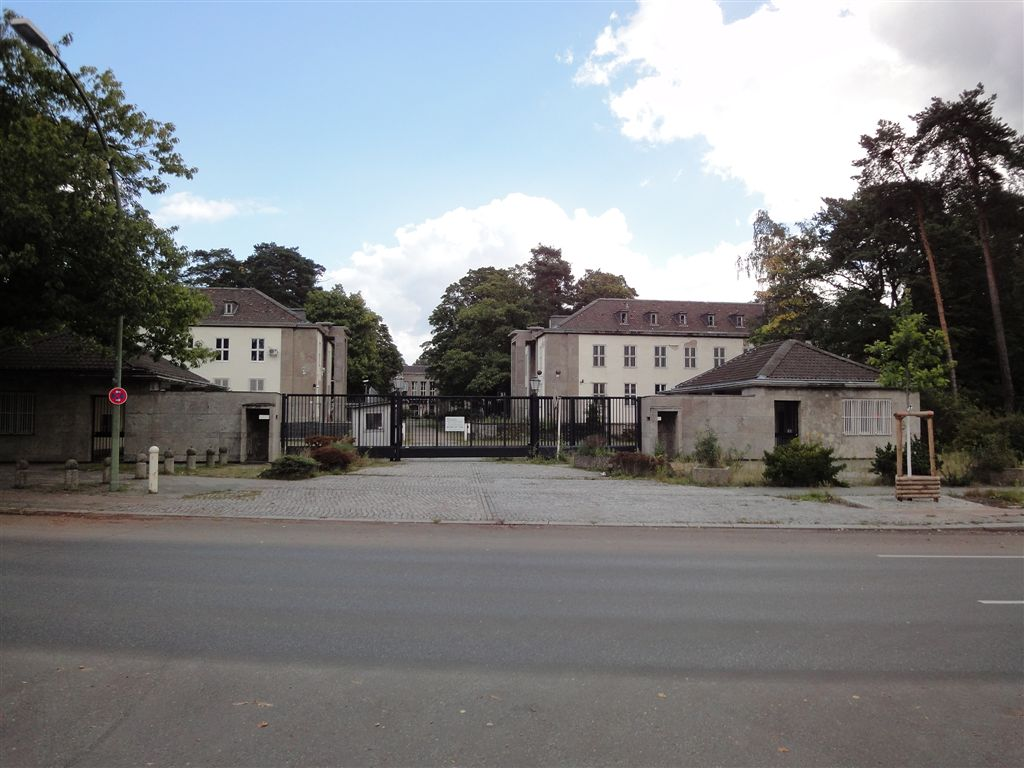
- Original location at 21 Föhrenweg (left) and later location at U.S. Armed Forces HQ compound on Clayallee (right).

- Location: West Berlin, West Germany
- Coordinates: 52.4577451°N 13.2751338°E (Föhrenweg); 52.451610°N 13.271376°E (Clayallee)
- Active: 1945–1994
- Agency: U.S. Central Intelligence Agency (Note: BOB was initially established under the Office of Strategic Services (OSS). On 1 October 1945, OSS intelligence and counterintelligence branches were transferred to the War Department as the Strategic Services Unit (SSU). Subsequently, BOB transitioned from the SSU to the Central Intelligence Group (CIG) and then, on 18 September 1947, to the Central Intelligence Agency (CIA).)

Berlin Operations Base (a.k.a. Berlin Operating Base, B.O.B., or BOB) was the headquarters of the CIA (and its predecessor organizations) in West Berlin during the Cold War.

Established by the OSS on 4 July 1945, BOB was originally located in a villa (Note: The building was designed by Albert Speer and built with air raid protection in mind, due to which it had three stories underground.) at 19-21 Föhrenweg in the suburb of Dahlem in the Zehlendorf district, which had suffered minimal bomb damage in World War II. By the early 1950s the base moved from the Föhrenweg villa to the more secure U.S. Armed Forces Berlin Headquarters compound located on Clayallee.

During its early years, BOB vied for primacy with CIA's operating base in Vienna. When the Allied occupation of Austria ended and Vienna ceased to be a Four Power territory, BOB became the forefront of US intelligence in the Cold War. Its opposite number in East Berlin was the KGB residency at Karlshorst.

BOB was deactivated in a ceremony held on 4 July 1994, shortly before the last Allied troops withdrew from Berlin in September.

== Leadership ==
BOB was headed by the following personnel:

No.	Image	Name	Dates Heading BOB
1		Allen Dulles	Departed shortly after the end of the war in 1945.
2		Richard Helms	Fall 1945–Christmas 1945.
3		Dana Durand	1946–1949.
4		Peter Sichel	1949–1952. Also Deputy Chief of BOB under Durand, 1946–1949.
5		William King Harvey	December 1952–July 1959.
6		David Murphy	September 1959–June 1961. Also Deputy Chief of BOB and head of BOB Soviet operations under Harvey, 1954–1959.
7		William Graver	August 1961–?

== History ==
=== Early Years (1945-1947) ===
At the time of its inception in 1945, the base suffered from severe personnel shortages, inadequate funds, and involvement in black market operations. Additionally, relations with the American military were initially cool; General Clay in particular feared that OSS intelligence operations directed at targets in the Soviet zone could damage the relationship between the Americans and the Soviets. Nonetheless, as the Soviets increased controls along zonal demarcation lines, the American military government came to feel the need for intelligence to help judge the economic and political situation in East Germany, and by 1947 even Clay had come to appreciate BOB's value.

During this period, as US intelligence restructured its intelligence and counterintelligence agencies (progressing from the OSS to the SSU to the CIG before finally settling as the CIA) BOB struggled to define its overall mission. SSU headquarters in Washington felt that BOB should concentrate on collecting strategic, national-level intelligence, while the US occupation authorities wanted current information on the Soviet zone. The latter ultimately won out, with BOB focusing primarily on meeting the need for local information.

Starting from late summer 1945, BOB increased reporting on Soviet zone issues including transportation, food supply, land reform, public opinion, and industrial conditions. These reports initially relied on interviews with refugees, but BOB soon began to develop agent sources as well. The Soviet takeover of East German railroads in 1945 was an early area of focus. BOB also began to focus on political reporting starting in December 1945, when issues between the Christian Democratic Union (CDU) and Soviet authorities brought East German politics to the attention of American intelligence leadership.
