= Arnold Lunn =

Skier, mountaineer and writer (1888–1974)

Sir Arnold Lunn
- Born: Arnold Henry Moore Lunn; April 18, 1888; Madras, India
- Died: June 2, 1974 (aged 86); London, England
- Education: Harrow School
- Alma mater: Balliol College, Oxford
- Occupations: Skier, mountaineer and writer
- Known for: Slalom skiing

Sir Arnold Henry Moore Lunn (18 April 1888 – 2 June 1974) was a British skier, mountaineer and writer. He was knighted for "services to British Skiing and Anglo-Swiss relations" in 1952. His father was a lay Methodist minister, but Lunn was an agnostic and wrote critically about Catholicism before he converted to it at the age of 45 and became an apologist.

He was born in Madras, India and died in London aged 86.

== Early life ==
Arnold Lunn was born in Madras, eldest of three sons and a daughter of Sir Henry Simpson Lunn (1859–1939) and Mary Ethel, née Moore, daughter of a canon. His father was firstly a Methodist minister and later founder of Lunn's Travel agency (that would become Lunn Poly), which encouraged tourism in the Swiss Alps. Arnold Lunn's two brothers were also authors. Hugh Kingsmill Lunn became a noted literary journalist under the name Hugh Kingsmill. Brian Lunn was best known for his translations, for his biography of Martin Luther and for his autobiography Switchback (1948). Arnold Lunn attended Orley Farm School, in Harrow, followed by Harrow School. He studied at Balliol College, Oxford, and while he was there, founded and was sometime President of the Oxford University Mountaineering Club.

== Skiing ==
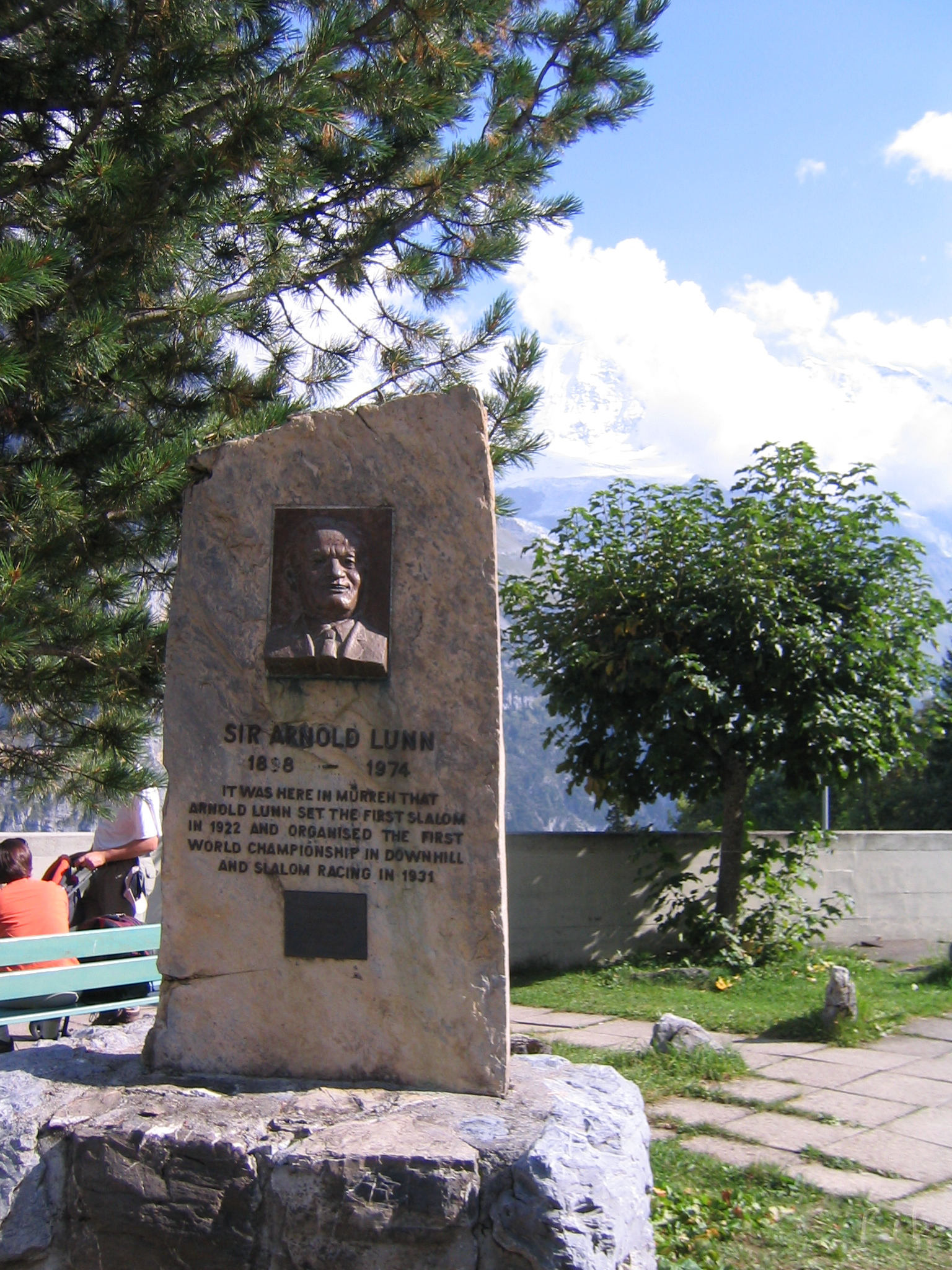
Memorial to Arnold Lunn in Mürren, Switzerland. The text reads, "It was here in Mürren that Arnold Lunn set the first slalom in 1922 and organised the first world championship in downhill and slalom racing in 1931."

Introduced to skiing by his father, he invented the slalom skiing race in 1922. Mathias Zdarsky had been running competitions through poles in the early years of the 20th century, but they were essentially style competitions, though they had to be completed within a specified time. In January 1921 Lunn organized the British national ski championship at Wengen, the first national championship to include a downhill race as well as jumping and cross-country. Early slalom events were decided on style, as Zdarsky's pole race had been. By 1922, however, Lunn, convinced that there was a real need for a race designed to test a skier's ability to turn securely and rapidly on steep Alpine ground, was insisting on speed being the only arbiter. "The object of a turn is to get round a given obstacle losing as little speed as possible," he wrote. "Therefore, a fast ugly turn is better than a slow pretty turn." On 21 January 1922, the Alpine Ski Challenge Cup, first held in 1920, was transformed into a challenge cup for slalom racing. On the practice slopes at Mürren, Lunn set pairs of flags through which the competitors had to turn, and the flags were so set as to test the main varieties of Alpine ski turns. Lunn's innovation was that the winner was simply the competitor who could make his way down in the shortest time. This first slalom was won by J. A. Joannides.

Lunn was the founder of the Alpine Ski Club (1908), the Ladies Ski Club (1923) and the Kandahar Ski Club (1924), and he was the organizer of many ski races around the world. He initiated in collaboration with the Austrian skier Hannes Schneider the Arlberg Kandahar Challenge Cup in honour of Lord Roberts of Kandahar. Through his efforts, the Downhill and Slalom races were introduced into the Olympic Games in 1936, although he opposed the Winter Olympic Games of that year being held in Garmisch-Partenkirchen. He later wrote, "In 1936 the Olympic Committee paid Hitler the greatest compliment in their power by entrusting the Nazis with the organisation of the summer and winter Olympic Games." Lunn refereed the slalom in the 1936 Winter Olympics, and his son, Peter, was the captain of the British ski team, but neither marched in the opening procession or attended the lavish banquet organised by the Nazis.

A double-black diamond trail at Taos Ski Valley, New Mexico is named for Sir Arnold Lunn. He was a long-standing member of the Committee of the International Ski Federation.

== Agnostic years ==
Lunn was the son of a Methodist lay preacher, but in his book Now I See (1933) he writes that the religious instruction he received at school was so "woolly" that "I was never a Methodist, nor, for that matter, an Anglican, in any proper sense of the term." As a result, when he read Leslie Stephen's An Agnostic's Apology, "I found myself defenceless – thanks to the miserable deficiency of Anglican education – against his onslaughts." Lunn became an agnostic.

In 1924 he published Roman Converts, which consisted of highly critical studies of five eminent converts to Roman Catholicism: John Henry Newman, Henry Edward Manning, George Tyrell, Gilbert Keith Chesterton and Ronald Knox.

== Critique of scientific materialism ==
At the same time, Lunn, whom Evelyn Waugh described as "restlessly reasonable", was becoming increasingly disconcerted by what he saw as the intense subjectivism of his age and the abandonment of reason in the realm of popular science (though not of science itself). He saw this as deriving from the philosophy of scientific materialism — the (extra-scientific) assumption that science points inevitably to materialism and that everything can be explained solely in terms of material processes. (Today the philosophical stance he critiqued would be called metaphysical naturalism.) In 1930 Lunn published The Flight from Reason, in which he argued that scientific materialism is finally a philosophy of nihilism: it ends by questioning the very basis of its own existence. If materialism be true, Lunn argued, our thoughts are the mere product of material processes uninfluenced by reason. They are, therefore, determined by irrational processes, and the thoughts which lead to the conclusion that materialism is true have no basis in reason.

== Conversion to Roman Catholicism ==
In the same year as The Flight from Reason appeared (1930), Lunn proposed to Knox an exchange of letters for subsequent publication in which he would advance all the objections he could conceive of to Roman Catholicism and Knox would reply. Knox accepted, and for more than a year the letters went to and fro. In 1932 they appeared as a book under the title Difficulties. This exchange did much to incline Lunn towards Catholicism, but even so, nearly two years were to elapse before he was received into the Catholic Church. In 1932 Lunn accepted a challenge from the noted philosopher C. E. M. Joad to discuss Christianity in a series of letters; they were published the following year as Is Christianity True? Joad, an agnostic, attacked Christianity on a wide variety of fronts, and Lunn, by now a believing Christian, if uncommitted to any particular denomination, responded. Lunn later wrote: "I can imagine no better training for the Church than to spend, as I did, a year arguing the case against Catholicism with a Catholic, and a second year in defending the Catholic position against an agnostic."

On 13 July 1933, Monsignor Knox received Lunn into the Catholic Church. Lunn's story of his conversion is related in Now I See, which was published in November of the same year. Lunn became, in Evelyn Waugh's words, "the most tireless Catholic apologist of his generation," and won the applause of fellow Catholic authors like Hilaire Belloc.

== Political views ==
During the Spanish Civil War, Lunn became a dedicated supporter of the Nationalist side; he wrote many anti-Republican articles for the British press, and was a member of the pro-Franco group Friends of National Spain. Lunn visited the Nationalist lines during the war and interviewed the Spanish General Gonzalo de Aguilera Munro; Lunn praised Aguilera as "not only a soldier but a scholar".

In 1937, Lunn published Spanish Rehearsal, a pro-Franco analysis of the Spanish war, and George Orwell reviewed it for Time and Tide together with Storm over Spain by Mairin Mitchell. In commending Mitchell’s well-informed analysis, Orwell savaged Spanish Rehearsal, in particular disputing that the burning of nuns was now commonplace in "red Spain".

Lunn was also a supporter of Benito Mussolini, stating in a 1938 speech that Mussolini's Fascism "has no sense of bullying" and that life in Mussolini's Italy was "largely the same" as it was before Mussolini took power. Lunn was opposed to Nazism for "its excesses", but lauded Neville Chamberlain for his signing of the Munich Agreement, saying Chamberlain did "a splendid job".

Lunn later became a friend of William F. Buckley, Jr. and a contributor to Buckley's National Review. Lunn's writings for the publication were marked by strong anti-communist sentiments.

== Personal life ==
=== Marriages ===
Towards the end of 1913 Lunn married Mabel Northcote, the granddaughter of Stafford Northcote, 1st Earl of Iddesleigh. They had three children, Peter, John and Jaqueta. Though not keen on mountaineering, Mabel shared her husband's love of skiing. She was the first woman to pass the British First Class skiing test, and she was a founder member of the Kandahar Ski Club. When her brother became 3rd Earl of Iddesleigh in 1927, she acquired the courtesy title of "Lady Mabel". Her husband wrote: "In the aristocracy of Mürren she welcomed this modest reminder of the fact that inventing the Slalom was not the only Lunn claim to respect." The Swiss, however, could never understand how Arnold could be "Mr. Lunn" and his wife "Lady Mabel", and their feelings were aptly conveyed by a member of the Kandahar who congratulated him when he was knighted "on making an honest Lady out of Mabel." Peter Lunn later became a noted British spymaster.

"Mabel," Lunn wrote, "was invincibly English and I was much consoled during the dark days of 1940 by the fact that her confidence in final victory was never shaken." Lunn once said something nice to their daughter Jaqueta about the latter's courage during an air raid. For this he was later reproved by Mabel. "I want Jaqueta to feel," she said, "that the only thing which calls for comment in war time is cowardice." Lunn was an agnostic when they married, and Mabel a devout Anglican, which she remained all her life. Lunn wrote: "Mabel's husband, brother and three children became Catholics, but I never expected her to follow our example. Humanly speaking, she was bound to remain a member of the Church of England." An Anglican vicar once asked Lunn to preach in his church. "I asked you," he said, "because you have never written anything unpleasant about Anglicanism since you became a Roman Catholic." But Lunn could never have written "anything unpleasant" about Mabel's Church, and when the first shock of his conversion was over, "Mabel soon yielded not merely notional but real assent to the belief that the doctrinal differences which separated Mabel the Anglican from Arnold the Catholic were infinitely, yes infinitely, less than those which had separated Mabel the Anglican from Arnold the agnostic."

Lady Mabel Lunn died on 4 March 1959.

Two years later, on 18 April 1961, Lunn married Phyllis Holt-Needham. In the early 1930s, Lunn was on the point of advertising for a secretary when his wife told him that she had found the perfect secretary for him, the niece of a friend of hers. As his wife had made up her mind, all that remained was for Lunn to demonstrate his "manly independence by a formal interview before engaging her candidate for the job." Two days later "a rather shy-looking young woman" was ushered into his office, Phyllis Holt-Needham. An account of the interview is given in Lunn's book Memory to Memory. At the time Lunn was exchanging controversial letters with J. B. S. Haldane, published later under the title Science and the Supernatural. According to Lunn, Phyllis, who was an agnostic and very familiar with modern attacks on Christianity, confidently expected that Haldane would demolish Lunn, and was "both surprised and annoyed" when she felt that Haldane has been unable to do so. Her first reaction was to find fault with Haldane as a controversialist and to be "unduly complimentary" about Lunn's controversial talents. Gradually, however, she began to suspect that it was the weakness of Haldane's case which enabled Lunn to get the better of his "intellectual superior," and this was the first step in her return to the Christian faith.

Although Phyllis was only mildly keen on skiing and never an accomplished practitioner, she was Assistant Editor to Lunn of the British Ski Year Book. In recognition, the Club elected her an Honorary Member.

Not long before his first wife died, Lunn wrote, she "confided to a friend that if anything ever happened to her, Phyllis would take me on, and few second marriages have been so warmly welcomed by the husband's children and friends, and for less obvious reasons by the husband's hostesses."

== Publications ==
- Guide to Montana, 1907.
- Oxford Mountaineering Essays, 1912 (editor).
- The Englishman in the Alps, 1912 (editor).
- The Harrovians, 1913. Novel. ISBN 1-4538-0948-1
- Ski-ing, 1913. Full text
- The Alps, 1914.
- Loose Ends, 1919. Novel.
- Was Switzerland Pro-German? 1920 (as Sutton Croft).
- Auction Piquet, 1920 (as "Rubicon").
- The Alpine Ski Guide to the Bernese Oberland, 1920.
- Alpine Ski-ing at All Heights and Seasons, 1921.
- Cross-Country Ski-ing, 1921.
- Roman Converts, 1924.
- Ski-ing for Beginners, 1924.
- The Mountains of Youth, 1924.
- A History of Ski-ing, 1927.
- Things That Have Puzzled Me, 1927. Essays.
- Switzerland: Her Topographical, Historical and Literary Landmarks, 1927.
- John Wesley, 1928.
- The Flight from Reason, 1930.
- The Complete Ski-Runner, 1930.
- Family Name, 1931. Novel.
- Venice: Its Story, Architecture and Art, 1932.
- Difficulties, 1932 (with Ronald Knox).
- The Italian Lakes and Lakeland Cities, 1932.
- Within the Precincts of the Prison, 1932.
- Is Christianity True? 1933 (with C. E. M. Joad).
- Public School Religion, 1933 (editor).
- Now I See, 1933.
- Ski-ing in a Fortnight, 1933.
- A Saint in the Slave Trade: Peter Claver 1581-1654, 1934.
- Science and the Supernatural, 1935 (with J. B. S. Haldane).
- Within That City, 1936. Essays.
- Spanish Rehearsal, 1937.
- Communism and Socialism: A Study in the Technique of Revolution, 1938.
- Revolutionary Socialism in Theory and Practice, 1939.
- Whither Europe?, 1940.
- Come What May: An Autobiography, 1940.
- And the Floods Came: A Chapter of War-Time Autobiography, 1942.
- Mountain Jubilee, 1943.
- The Good Gorilla, 1943. Essays.
- Switzerland and the English, 1944.
- The Third Day, 1945. Full text
- Is the Catholic Church Anti-Social? 1946 (with G. G. Coulton).
- Is Evolution Proved? A Debate between Douglas Dewar and H. S. Shelton, 1947 (editor).
- Switzerland in English Prose and Poetry, 1947 (editor).
- Mountains of Memory, 1948.
- The Revolt against Reason, 1950.
- The Cradle of Switzerland, 1952. Full text
- The Story of Ski-ing, 1952.
- Zermatt and the Valais, 1955.
- Memory to Memory, 1956. Memoirs.
- Enigma: A Study of Moral Re-Armament, 1957.
- A Century of Mountaineering 1857-1957: A Centenary Tribute to the Alpine Club, 1957.
- The Bernese Oberland, 1958.
- And Yet So New, 1958. Memoirs.
- The Englishman on Ski, 1963 (editor).
- The Swiss and Their Mountains: A Study of the Influence of Mountains on Man, 1963.
- The New Morality, 1964 (with Garth Lean).
- Matterhorn Centenary, 1965.
- The Cult of Softness, 1965 (with Garth Lean).
- Unkilled for So Long, 1968. Memoirs.
- Christian Counter-Attack, 1968 (with Garth Lean).
- The Kandahar Story: A Tribute on the Occasion of Mürren's Sixtieth Ski-ing Season, 1969.

=== Selected articles ===
- "Switzerland in War Time," The Living Age, Vol. I, 22 January 1916.
- "Ski Tours with the British Interned," The Cornhill Magazine, Vol. XLVI, 1919.
- "Downhill Racing," The Atlantic, 1 February 1949.
- "Amateurs on Ski," New Statesman, 12 January 1962.

=== Miscellany ===
- "Mountaineering on Ski," in Geoffrey Winthrop Young, ed., Mountain Craft. London: Methuen & Co., Ltd., 1920.
- Is Evolution Proved?, with an Introduction by Arnold Lunn. London: Hollis & Carter, 1947.

He was a contributor to the Encyclopædia Britannica, and editor, from 1920 to 1971, of the British Ski Year Book.

== See also ==
- Phrop
