= William King Harvey =

American spy (1915–1976)

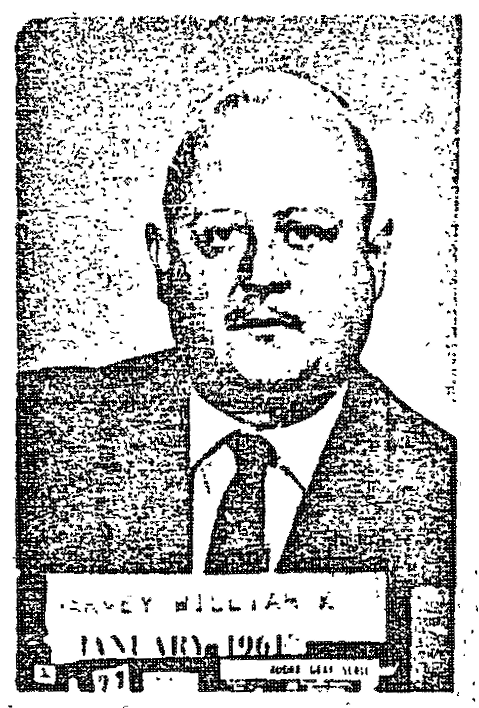
- CIA personnel file photo of Harvey (Jan 1961).
- Born: September 13, 1915; Cleveland, Ohio, U.S.
- Died: June 9, 1976 (aged 60); Indianapolis, Indiana, U.S.
- Occupation: CIA Agent

William King "Bill" Harvey (September 13, 1915 – June 9, 1976) was an American Central Intelligence Agency (CIA) officer, best known for his role in the terrorism and sabotage campaign against Cuba, known as Operation Mongoose. He was known as "America's James Bond", a tag given to him by Edward Lansdale.

== Early life and education ==
Harvey was born on September 13, 1915, in Cleveland, Ohio, the son of Sara King Harvey, an English professor at Indiana State Teachers College in Terre Haute. An Eagle Scout, he skipped several grades and graduated from Wiley High School in Terre Haute in 1931.

After working as a printer and reporter at the Danville Gazette, a Danville, Indiana-based newspaper owned by his grandfather, from 1931 to 1933, he enrolled in an accelerated program at Indiana University which encompassed two years of undergraduate studies and enabled him to receive an honors LL.B. from Indiana University School of Law in 1937.

== Career ==
=== Federal Bureau of Investigation ===
Harvey joined the Federal Bureau of Investigation in December 1940, (where he specialized in German and Soviet counterintelligence) throughout World War II and its immediate aftermath.

In July 1947, he broke a regulation on being available on two-hour call after sleeping late after heavy drinking at a party the night before. He refused the resulting demotion and reassignment to Indianapolis, preferring to resign. He joined the Central Intelligence Agency shortly thereafter.

=== Central Intelligence Agency ===
File 01228800 discussing Harvey

As he plotted to reduce the FBI's overseas powers, Harvey's knowledge of the FBI proved valuable. Along with James Angleton, he became one of the foremost operatives in the secret war against the KGB during the Cold War. According to journalist David Martin, Harvey swiftly gained a reputation for consuming more alcohol than any other person in the United States government; however, no one ever saw him drunk during this period.

Harvey's CIA career began with his founding of Staff D, the electronic surveillance branch of the Clandestine Service Division. In 1951, his investigation of the career history of Kim Philby, noting suspicious coincidences which suggested he had long been a Soviet agent, had the CIA demanding that Philby be kept out of his position as MI6 liaison; Philby was fired. Six months earlier, Harvey had got into a fight with Guy Burgess at a party after Burgess had drunkenly drawn a lewd cartoon of Harvey's wife.

From 1952 to 1960, Harvey was posted to West Berlin as the chief of Berlin Operations Base, where he led the operation that built a tunnel to the Soviet sector to spy on their communication channels. This operation was called PBJOINTLY. On his return to CIA headquarters, Harvey was tasked with a project to organize "executive actions" (a euphemism for the assassination of foreign political leaders) under the codename ZR/RIFLE. To kill Fidel Castro, Harvey decided he needed to employ the resources of the American Mafia. He drew on the connections of businessman and CIA asset Robert Maheu, who had cultivated relationships with Sam Giancana, Santo Trafficante Jr., Johnny Roselli and other figures. Finding Maheu's operation chaotic, Harvey cut everyone but Roselli out, and ran the operations against Castro himself. In April 1962 he gave poison pills to Roselli, intended to be used against Castro. Harvey became good friends with Roselli, so much so that his daughter took to calling him "Uncle Johnny".

Harvey was also involved in Operation Mongoose, a CIA operation run from Miami that ran various attempts to undermine or overthrow the Cuban Revolution. He was appointed as chief of Task Force W, which Harvey named after a hero of his, William Walker. At the height of the Cuban Missile Crisis in October 1962, Harvey sent ten intelligence operatives into Cuba to gather intelligence and prepare for an invasion Harvey thought inevitable. The unauthorized operation tarnished Harvey's reputation. Reportedly Harvey was called into the White House where he lost his temper and told Attorney General Bobby Kennedy that “If you fuckers hadn’t fucked up the Bay of Pigs, we wouldn’t be in this fucking mess!”. The argument ended with Kennedy storming out of the room. CIA director John McCone would say "Harvey has destroyed himself today. His usefulness has ended". Harvey had come to resent Bobby Kennedy, according to a friend he hated him "with a purple passion". He was eventually reassigned to Rome as station chief in 1963 following a punitive administrative post at CIA headquarters, he failed to acclimate to the milieu and was denied a high-profile assignment in the Laotian Civil War by Richard Helms. Notably, Harvey recommended Colonel Renzo Rocca, chief of the Italian military intelligence Division R, as liaison for building up the Italian component of Operation Gladio in 1964. However, his drinking and health deteriorated, and he was ultimately relieved.

Although Harvey briefly headed a CIA headquarters unit on possible countermeasures to electronic surveillance, he took an extended leave of absence (largely precipitated by his alcoholism and the concurrent fallout from his relationship with Roselli, who had been convicted in an elaborate card-cheating case) throughout much of 1967. He formally retired from the CIA in January 1968. Following a brief law practice in Washington, D.C., Harvey and his family moved to Indianapolis amid fears of ongoing surveillance in 1969. During this period, he curtailed his alcohol use and edited legal decisions for the Bobbs-Merrill Company. In 1975, he testified before the Church Committee on some of the CIA's past operations.

=== Assassination of John F. Kennedy ===
After the death of former CIA officer and Watergate figure E. Howard Hunt in 2007, Saint John Hunt and David Hunt revealed that their father had recorded several claims about himself and others being involved in a conspiracy to assassinate John F. Kennedy. In the April 5, 2007, issue of Rolling Stone, Saint John Hunt detailed a number of individuals implicated by his father, including Harvey, Lyndon B. Johnson, Cord Meyer, David Sánchez Morales, David Atlee Phillips, Frank Sturgis, and an assassin he termed "French gunman grassy knoll", who many presume was Lucien Sarti.

The two sons alleged that their father excised the information from his memoirs, "American Spy: My Secret History in the CIA, Watergate and Beyond", to avoid possible perjury charges. Hunt's widow and other children told the Los Angeles Times that the two sons took advantage of Hunt's loss of lucidity by coaching and exploiting him for financial gain. The newspaper said it examined the materials offered by the sons to support the story and found them to be "inconclusive." In a 2023 podcast with Soledad O'Brien, "Who Killed JFK", Rob Reiner described Harvey and General Charles A. Willoughby as the master planners and tacticians of the Kennedy assassination.

== Personal life ==
He married Libby McIntire, the daughter of a lawyer from Maysville, Kentucky, but the marriage ended in divorce in 1954.

Immediately thereafter, he married Clara Grace "CG" Follick, a former CIA personnel officer who was the first woman to attain the rank of major in the United States Army. From 1960 to 1969, Harvey and his family, including a son from his first marriage and a daughter adopted by Harvey and Follick during his German assignment, lived in Chevy Chase Village, Maryland.

== Death ==
Harvey died in Indianapolis on June 9, 1976, from a heart attack, at the age of 60. Many files related to Harvey do not survive. According to his wife, after he died their home was broken into twice, which she attributed to Harvey's CIA colleagues. However, she had already burned the files he had left behind, as he had instructed her to do. Additionally, after the JFK Records Act was passed in 1992, the Assassination Records Review Board (ARRB) which was set up in accordance with the act, sought out Harvey's Cuban "operational diaries". It discovered that after the CIA Inspector General report of 1967 on plots to kill Castro, the director of the CIA, Dick Helms, ordered all files on which the report was based to be destroyed. The ARRB believes Harvey's diaries may have been destroyed as a consequence of this order.
