= Thomson Travel Group =

Former business owned by the Thomson Corporation

- Company type: Public
- Industry: Travel and Tourism
- Founded: 1965; 61 years ago
- Founder: Roy Thomson
- Defunct: 2002
- Successor: TUI Northern Europe Limited
- Headquarters: Luton, England
- Area served: United Kingdom
- Products: Charter and scheduled passenger airlines, package holidays, cruise lines, hotels and resorts
- Parent: Preussag AG

Thomson Travel Group plc was a business formed by the Thomson Corporation of Canada, when it was floated on the London Stock Exchange in 1998. It was acquired by Preussag AG, an industrial and transport conglomerate, in 2000. The group continued until 2002 when it was renamed TUI Northern Europe Limited, a full subsidiary of TUI AG.

== History ==
The company was created in 1965 when Thomson Corporation of Canada acquired four tour operators, Skytours, Riviera, Luxitours and Gaytours as well as the airline Britannia Airways, and named the combined business Thomson Travel.

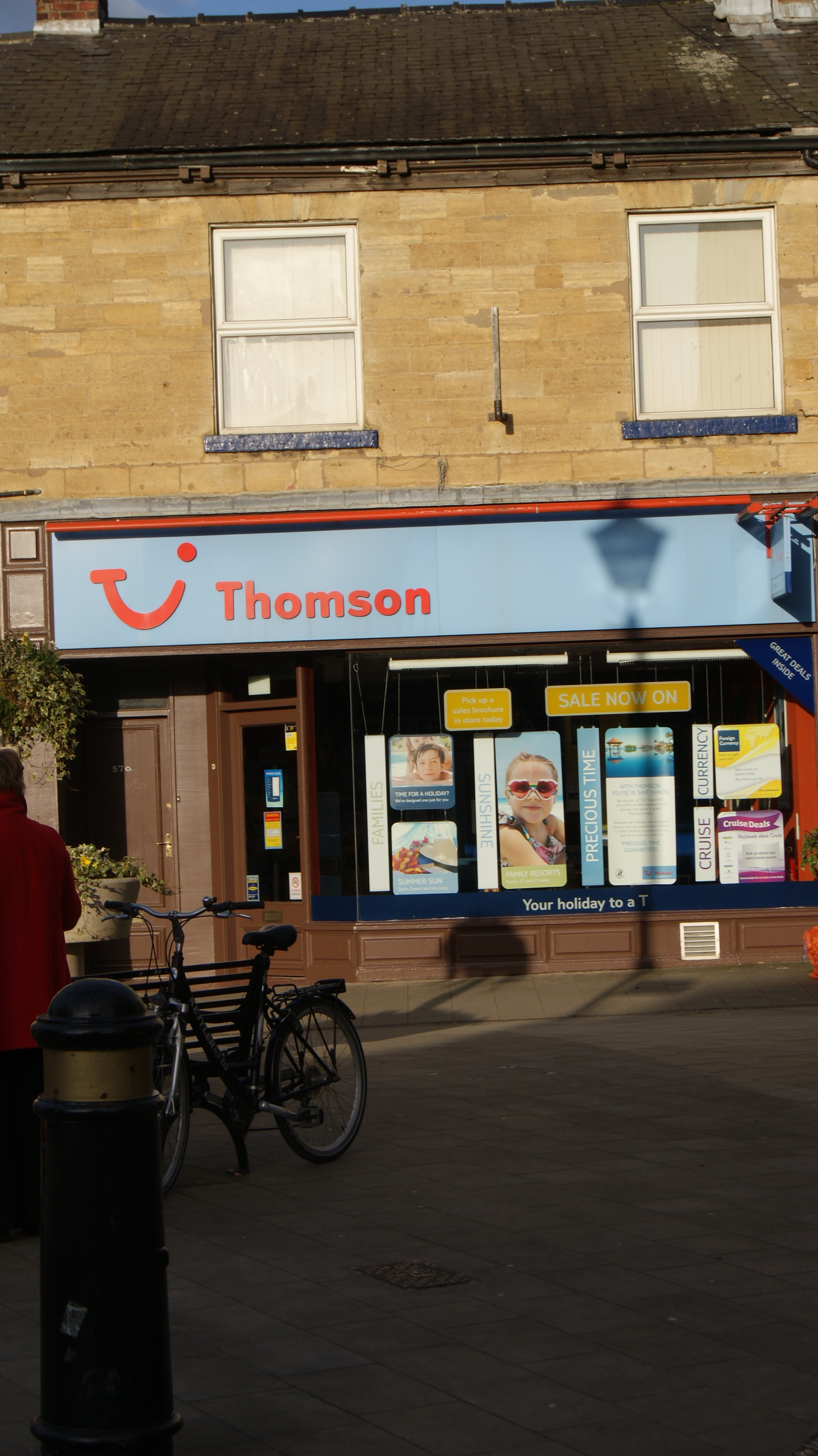
Thomson travel agents in Wetherby, United Kingdom in 2012

In 1970, the business was re-launched as "Thomson Holidays" under the leadership of Bryan Llewellyn as managing director.

In 1972 Thomson acquired Lunn Poly, a small chain of agents which Thomson grew to become the largest chain of travel agents in the United Kingdom.

In 1981, Thomson Holidays were the first recorded users of Business-to-Business online shopping.

The business was floated on the London Stock Exchange with a valuation of £1.7 billion as Thomson Travel in May 1998.

In 2000, Thomson Travel was acquired by Preussag AG, an industrial and transport conglomerate. Although Preussag AG, which re-named as TUI AG in 2002, retained the Thomson brand for a while, it was retired completely in 2017.

== Thomson Founders' Club ==
When Thomson Travel was floated in 1998, new shareholders were given membership in the "Thomson Founders' Club" which offered a 10% discount on Thomson holidays. Membership was conditional on retaining a minimum of 294 shares, but when Thomson Travel was acquired by Preussag membership of the Founders' Club was made permanent and unconditional. However, on 31 January 2008 the Club was abolished without notice or compensation.
