= Henry Lunn =

English humanitarian and religious figure (1859 – 1939)

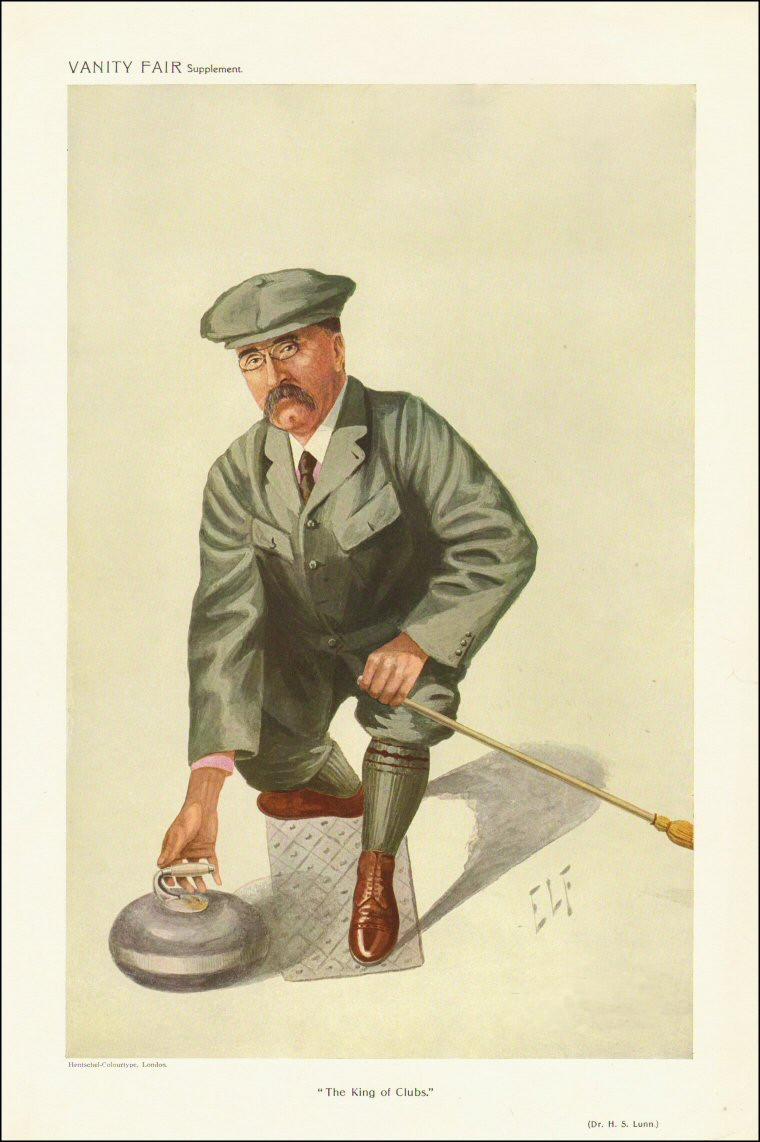
"The King of Clubs" Lunn as caricatured by ELF (Luke Fildes) in Vanity Fair, October 1909

Sir Henry Simpson Lunn (30 July 1859 – 18 March 1939) was an English humanitarian and religious figure, and also founder of Lunn Poly, one of the UK's largest travel companies.

== Early life ==
Henry Lunn was born in Horncastle, Lincolnshire, the eldest child – and elder son – of greengrocer Henry Lunn and Susanna, the daughter of Simpson Green. His parents, married in Horncastle in 1858, were both devout Wesleyan Methodists and their son was raised in that tradition. He gained a place at Horncastle Grammar School. He attended Headingley College, Leeds, for instruction to become a church minister and was ordained in 1886. He also trained as a medical doctor at Trinity College, Dublin.

== Personal life ==
Lunn's marriage to Mary Ethel Moore, the daughter of a canon, produced four children: alpine skiing pioneer Arnold Lunn, writers Hugh Kingsmill Lunn and Brian Lunn, and a daughter who predeceased him.

He wrote two autobiographical works: Chapters from My Life (1918) and Nearing Harbour (1934). He died at the Hospital of St John and St Elizabeth in St John's Wood.

== Career ==
After one year of missionary service in India, Lunn was forced to return in 1888 to Lincolnshire after contracting an illness. His criticism of the conditions for Methodist missionaries in India led him to conflict with his fellow ministers, and he sought to explore wider horizons. He concentrated on his religious belief of Christian unity and co-operation, which was a forerunner of the Ecumenical Movement. As such, he was the founder of the Co-operative Educational Tours in 1893 and organized meetings of predominantly English church leaders at the annual Grindelwald Reunion Conferences, between 1892 and 1896. In 1902, he organised his first inclusive tours at Adelboden and Wengen, Switzerland, which started the trend for British visitors to combine a religious/health retreat with winter sports. Many Anglican churches were established at fashionable winter resorts.

In 1905 he formed the Public Schools Alpine Sports Club which secured the use of major hotels and the sanatorium at Le Beauregard. With Lord Bryce, he founded the Hellenic Travellers Club in 1906 and this success led his second company, Alpine Sports Limited, founded two years later, to open up many winter sports resorts by organising tours. In 1908 he convened a meeting at the Devonshire Club to found the Alpine Ski Club, a gentleman's club for ski-mountaineers.

Lunn was a vocal opponent of the Boer War but remained in the confidences of leading politicians. He became a Knight Bachelor in 1910 and was active in Liberal politics, forming a strong friendship with Asquith. He stood twice for Parliament in 1910 for Boston and 1923 for Brighton, but was unsuccessful. In 1924 he was the first editor of The Review of The English Churches. The first edition was published in January of that year and included an article on birth control, and one on prohibition in the United States. He helped form the Irish Protestant Home Rule Association. Although he continued to travel and promote his vision of the union of churches with the League of Nations, his company (renamed as Sir Henry Lunn Travel) grew to become one of the largest travel agents in Britain. During the 1960s the company was merged with the Polytechnic Touring Association to form Lunn Poly.

== Bibliography ==
- A Friend of Missions in India (1890)
- Cycling Tours, 1898–9 (ed., with C.F.S. Perowne, 1898)
- Municipal Studies and International Friendship (1906)
- Municipal Lessons from Southern Germany (1908)
- Retreats for the Soul (1913)
- The Love of Jesus: A Manual of Prayer, Meditation and Preparation for Holy Communion (1914)
- Chapters from My Life: With Special Reference to Reunion (1918)
- Retreats for the Soul (1918)
- Round the World with a Dictaphone: a record of men and movements in 1926 (1927)
- Ægean civilizations (ed., with Hellenic Travellers' Club, 1927)
- A free church impression (1931)
- The Secret of the Saints: Studies in Prayer, Meditation and Self-Discipline (1933)
- Nearing Harbour: The Log of Sir Henry S. Lunn (1934)
