= Lunn Poly =

British travel agency chain, 1965–2004

- Type: Subsidiary
- Industry: Travel
- Predecessor: Polytechnic Touring Association; Sir Henry Lunn Travel
- Founded: 1965
- Defunct: 2004
- Fate: Rebranded as Thomson, now TUI
- Headquarters: Luton, United Kingdom
- Number of locations: 785 (2004 prior to rebrand)
- Key people: John McEwan – Managing Director (2000-2003)
- Products: Package Holidays
- Parent: TUI Travel

Lunn Poly was a large chain of travel agents in the United Kingdom. TUI Travel acquired Lunn Poly in 2003, and by the end of 2004 had retired the brand absorbing it within the wider Thomson Travel group.

== History ==
The company originated from two successful travel agencies established in the 1890s, the Polytechnic Touring Association and Sir Henry Lunn Travel. The latter an early travel innovator for winter sports trips to Switzerland and Italy, as well as religious tours to Palestine. Both firms were acquired in the 1950s by the British Eagle airline group, and combined into Lunn Poly in 1965.

It became a nationalised industry as part of the Transport Holding Company (THC) in 1969, a controlling stake costing £169,000. Trading losses during the ownership were estimated at £1.2m before the sale to Sunair in 1971 for £175,000. In October, Sunair and Lunn Poly operated the first Boeing 747 package holiday charter flight to Majorca using a leased BOAC aircraft. In 1972, the company became part of Thomson Travel Group.

Lunn Poly became an early trade innovator, by splitting its leisure and business travel. High street shops concentrated on package holidays, specialized offices were structured to serve the needs of business and industry. This business model was highly successful throughout the 1970s and 1980s. By the end of the 1980s, Lunn Poly had over 500 shops, and by the mid-1990s it was the largest travel agency in the UK. In 1995 it entered the holiday voucher market, valued at £400million to compete with Thomas Cook. The rivalry with Thomas Cook, and Going Places, led to a fierce price war in which Lunn Poly estimated it was sacrificing £10m per year to attract new customers away from its competitors. In 1998, Lunn Poly were the UKs largest wholly owned retailer of air-holidays with 2.3m air inclusive holidays sold, representing 20% of the market.

At the turn of the millennium, Lunn Poly unveiled alternative store formats including a megastore which had five key areas – long haul, short breaks, summer sun, families and late trips – the first of which opened in Leicester. A trial of family holiday only stores took place in Coventry but was not pursued further by Lunn Poly. At the time, a number of South Wales stores rebranded from Lunn Poly to Travel House due to the latter's enhanced reputation in the region. By January 2003, Lunn Poly began to refine the megastore concept further, reducing the size of the new out of town stores to around 4,000 sq ft compared to the original Leicester stores floor span of 10,000 sq ft. The first new concept store opened in Swansea.

When TUI UK, which had acquired Thomson Travel, rebranded Britannia Airways as Thomsonfly in November 2003, the company insisted that there were no plans to rebrand Lunn Poly. The headquarters was moved from Lunn Poly House in Leamington Spa to London during the acquisition. In October 2004, TUI sold a number of Travel House Group stores to Martin Morgan Travel, before confirming the remainder would be rebranded to Lunn Poly. On 2 November 2004, the announcement was made that all Lunn Poly shops in the United Kingdom were to be rebranded as Thomson.

Despite the brand disappearing in 2004, Lunn Poly Limited was retained as a dormant company, registered at TUI's UK headquarters in Luton until its dissolution from the UK companies house register in June 2024. In 2011, former employee Robert Bonnar was jailed for admitting to laundering £500,000 through a Lunn Poly store in Glasgow between 2002 and 2003.

== Marketing ==
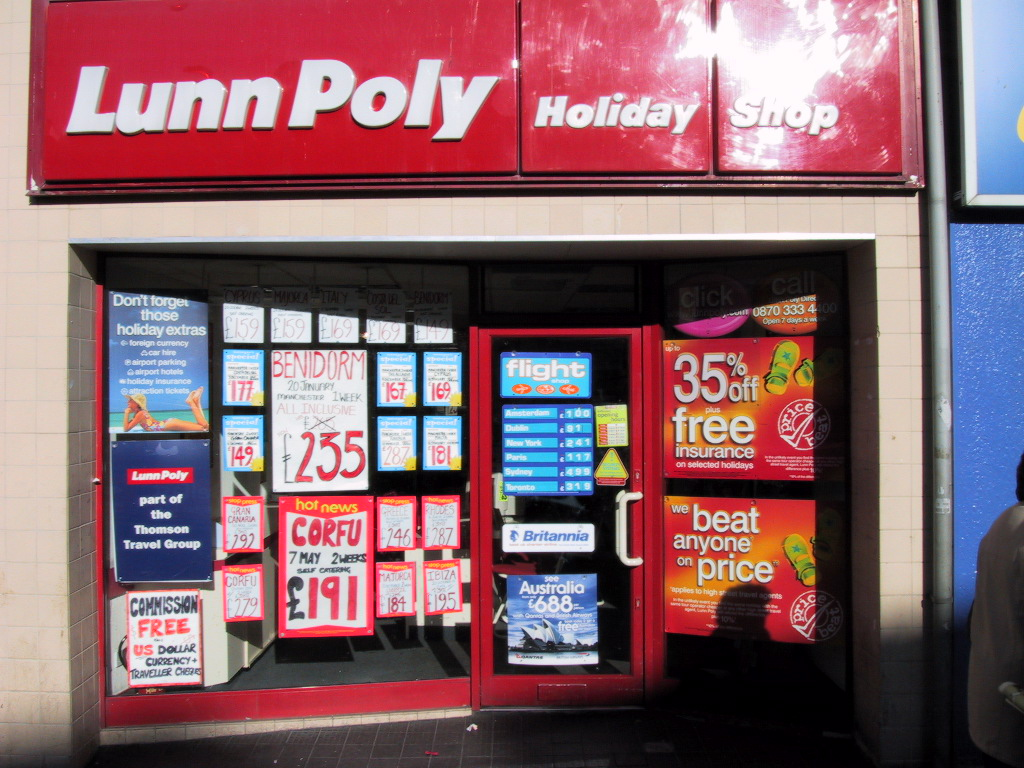
Lunn Poly high street store with pre-TUI branding

=== Lunn Poly Television ===
Lunn Poly Television began broadcasting on 1 June 2004, via Sky Digital. The 18 hour per day broadcast was produced by The Travel Channel, and was backed by a £1million advertising campaign across the Sky platform. As part of TUI retiring the Lunn Poly name, the TV channel was rebranded as Thomson TV before the end of 2004.

=== Advertising ===
Lunn Poly was famous for a long-running advertising campaign on television. These adverts featured people looking into what holidays the company offered. Another person would then say to them in disbelief "Lunn Poly? Get away!", at which point the person would disappear into thin air and end up at a holiday spot.

In 2003, Lunn Poly relaunched its Getaway slogan as part of a new advertising campaign.

=== Whispering Windows ===
In late 2003, Lunn Poly introduced Whispering Windows created by Newlands Scientific. The technology would allow the windows to effectively talk to the customer, designed to encourage more interaction with the high street stores. The estimated increase in footfall during the first week of the windows was 42%.
