= Jeff Toms =

Canadian ice hockey player

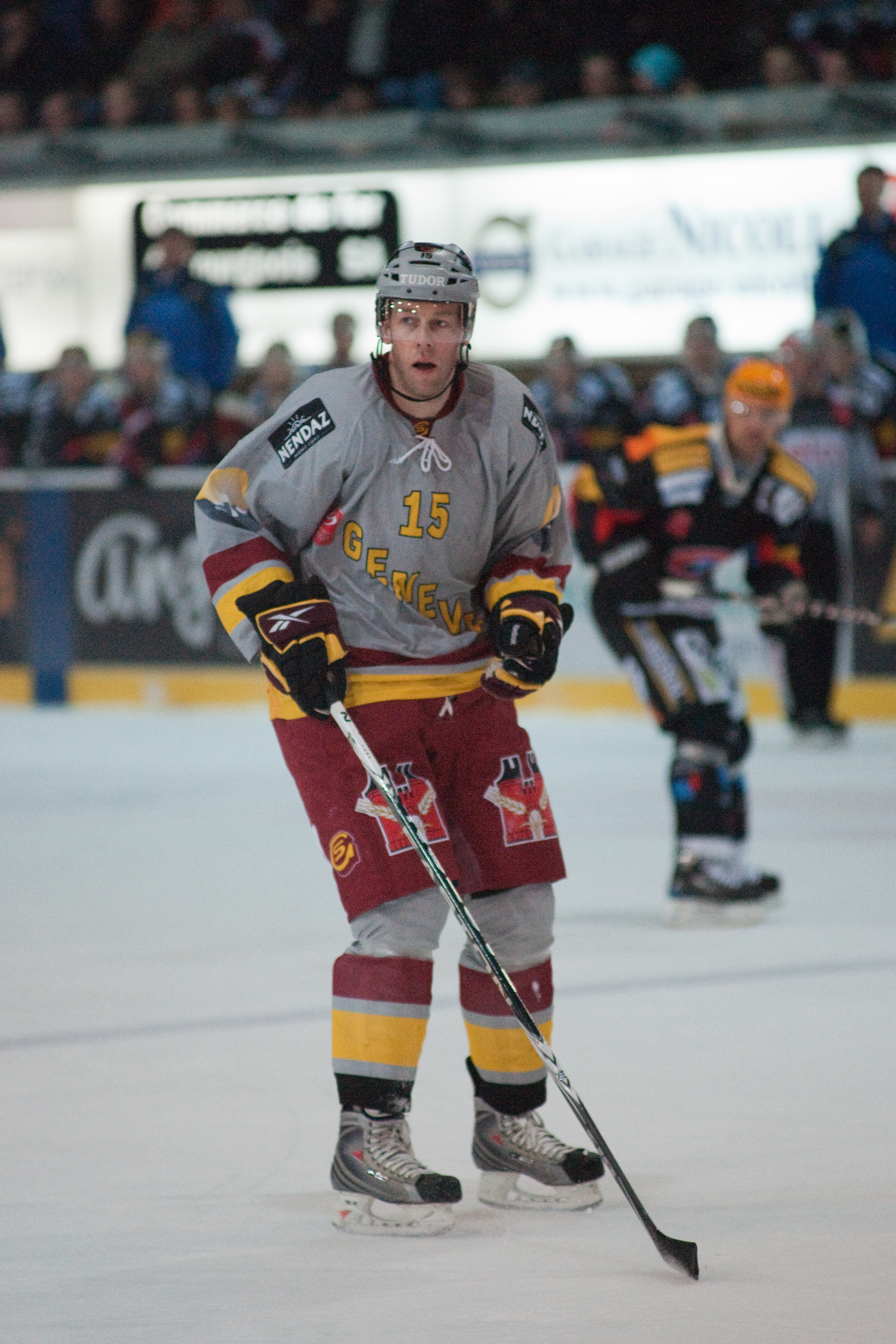
- Born: June 4, 1974 (age 52) Swift Current, Saskatchewan, Canada
- Height: 6 ft 4 in (193 cm)
- Weight: 207 lb (94 kg; 14 st 11 lb)
- Position: Centre
- Shot: Left
- Played for: Florida Panthers; New York Islanders; New York Rangers; Pittsburgh Penguins; Tampa Bay Lightning; Washington Capitals; EHC Basel; HC Ambri-Piotta; SCL Tigers; Genève-Servette HC
- National team: Canada
- NHL draft: 210th overall, 1992; New Jersey Devils
- Playing career: 1994–2011

Jeff Toms (born June 4, 1974) is a Canadian former professional ice hockey player. Toms was selected by the New Jersey Devils 210th overall in the 1992 NHL entry draft.

== Playing career ==
Before ever playing for the New Jersey Devils, Toms was traded to the Tampa Bay Lightning, where he would spend a few seasons before he was claimed on waivers by the Washington Capitals. On December 5, 1997, Toms scored the first game winning goal and first overtime goal in Capital One Arena (then MCI Center) history. Toms would also play for the New York Islanders, New York Rangers, Pittsburgh Penguins, and Florida Panthers.

In 2003, Toms moved to Europe, splitting the 2003-04 season with spells in the Russian Superleague for HC Severstal Cherepovets and in Nationalliga A in Switzerland with EHC Basel. Toms would go on to play the remainder of his career in Switzerland, playing two seasons with HC Ambri-Piotta, three with SCL Tigers and then finishing his playing career with Genève-Servette HC. He played for Team Canada in the Spengler Cup in 2004, 2005, and 2006.

== Career statistics ==
=== Regular season and playoffs ===
			Regular season					Playoffs
Season	Team	League	GP	G	A	Pts	PIM	GP	G	A	Pts	PIM
1991–92	Sault Ste. Marie Greyhounds	OHL	35	9	5	14	0	16	0	1	1	2
1992–93	Sault Ste. Marie Greyhounds	OHL	60	16	23	39	20	16	4	4	8	7
1993–94	Sault Ste. Marie Greyhounds	OHL	64	52	45	97	19	14	11	4	15	2
1994–95	Atlanta Knights	IHL	40	7	8	15	10	4	0	0	0	4
1995–96	Atlanta Knights	IHL	68	16	18	34	18	1	0	0	0	0
1995–96	Tampa Bay Lightning	NHL	1	0	0	0	0	—	—	—	—	—
1996–97	Adirondack Red Wings	AHL	37	11	16	27	8	4	1	2	3	0
1996–97	Tampa Bay Lightning	NHL	34	2	8	10	10	—	—	—	—	—
1997–98	Tampa Bay Lightning	NHL	13	1	2	3	7	—	—	—	—	—
1997–98	Washington Capitals	NHL	33	3	4	7	8	1	0	0	0	0
1998–99	Portland Pirates	AHL	20	3	7	10	8	—	—	—	—	—
1998–99	Washington Capitals	NHL	21	1	5	6	2	—	—	—	—	—
1999–00	Portland Pirates	AHL	33	16	21	37	16	4	1	1	2	2
1999–00	Washington Capitals	NHL	20	1	2	3	4	—	—	—	—	—
2000–01	Springfield Falcons	AHL	5	6	5	11	0	—	—	—	—	—
2000–01	New York Islanders	NHL	39	2	4	6	119	—	—	—	—	—
2000–01	Hartford Wolf Pack	AHL	12	4	9	13	2	5	6	0	6	2
2000–01	New York Rangers	NHL	15	1	1	2	0	—	—	—	—	—
2001–02	Hartford Wolf Pack	AHL	9	6	6	12	4	—	—	—	—	—
2001–02	New York Rangers	NHL	38	7	4	11	10	—	—	—	—	—
2001–02	Pittsburgh Penguins	NHL	14	2	1	3	4	—	—	—	—	—
2002–03	San Antonio Rampage	AHL	64	30	33	63	28	1	0	0	0	0
2002–03	Florida Panthers	NHL	8	2	2	4	4	—	—	—	—	—
2003–04	EHC Basel	NLA	25	14	11	25	14	—	—	—	—	—
2003–04	Severstal Cherepovets	RSL	14	0	2	2	8	—	—	—	—	—
2004–05	HC Ambri-Piotta	NLA	38	21	27	48	26	5	1	1	2	0
2005–06	HC Ambri-Piotta	NLA	40	11	29	40	46	7	4	5	9	6
2006–07	SCL Tigers	NLA	33	13	20	33	38	—	—	—	—	—
2007–08	SCL Tigers	NLA	40	20	40	60	36	—	—	—	—	—
2008–09	SCL Tigers	NLA	23	16	16	32	41	—	—	—	—	—
2009–10	Geneve-Servette HC	NLA	40	8	28	36	44	—	—	—	—	—
2010–11	Geneve-Servette HC	NLA	43	12	24	36	24	—	—	—	—	—
NHL totals			236	22	33	55	59	1	0	0	0	0
