= AHL participation at the Spengler Cup =

Ice hockey team tournament participation

Ice hockey teams belonging to the American Hockey League have taken part at the Spengler Cup, an invitational annual international tournament held in Davos, Switzerland and televised across Europe, Canada and Asia. The Rochester Americans participated in the 1996 and 2013 editions of the tournament, placing third and exiting in the quarterfinal, respectively. Future participation of AHL teams has been publicly discussed by the tournament organizers, addressed in online petitions started by US-based hockey fans and directed at the Spengler Cup organizing committee (these petitions were in turn covered by Swiss media), and has been the subject of coverage in online ice hockey media where AHL executives have promoted the idea

There are numerous difficulties associated with Spengler Cup participation of American Hockey League teams: travel costs incurred by the tournament organizer, the tight scheduling of the AHL, the adjustment AHL teams face in playing on a larger international ice surface, as well as jet lag (due to the change in time zone associated with travel) and altitude changes (Davos is located at an altitude of 5120 feet- the closest AHL rink altitude is that of the Budweiser Events Center home of the Colorado Eagles at 4984 feet, in Loveland, Colorado.

== Rochester Americans at the 1996 Spengler Cup ==
The Rochester Americans made their Spengler Cup debut in 1996, starting against hosts HC Davos. Despite Scott Metcalfe scoring the opening goal of the tournament for the Amerks, they would end up losing the first game 9-2. This was followed by a 3-5 loss to Team Canada. The Amerks would only win from then on, defeating Leksands IF of the Swedish league and the Finnish league's Jokerit in a shoot-out for a third-place finish.

The 1996 Rochester entry was notable for the fact that the Buffalo Sabres did not allow goaltender Steve Shields (who was under contract to the Sabres but playing for Rochester) to accompany the Amerks. This was due to worries about there not being enough goaltenders available to play for the Sabres in the NHL. In the estimation of the Sabres organization there would have been great difficulty in flying a player back from Switzerland on a moment's notice. Kevin Weekes of the Florida Panthers would join the Amerks for the tournament as a replacement for Shields.

== The Amerks at the 2013 Spengler Cup ==
On April 19, 2013, the second participation of the Rochester Americans was announced on the NHL website. Previously, in late 2012, Swiss media had reported that negotiations between the Spengler Cup organizing committee (Fredi Pargätzi and the Chairman of HC Davos, Gaudenz Domenig) and the AHL executive team were taking place in New York.

The Amerks would enter the tournament missing two key players, Michael Zigomanis and Jamie Tardif, due to injury. Combined with the fact that several other leading players (such as captain Matt Ellis) were called up to play for the Sabres, this left the Amerks with inexperienced and young offensive lines

Rochester lost their opening game to Swiss club HC Geneve-Servette with 5-0. Two Amerks players incurred game misconduct ejections, Luke Adam for a check to the head of Kaspars Daugavins, and Frederick Roy for attacking Servette's Cody Almond. The Amerks then lost 4-3 to the KHL's CSKA Moscow, with Phil Varone and Luke Adam contributing goals. Their fate was sealed in the quarterfinal against Team Canada, where despite a strong second period with goals by Alex Hutchings, Daniel Catenacci and Joel Armia, they would lose 6-3.

== The Future ==
The notion of another AHL entry to the Spengler Cup has been discussed by Swiss sports commentators on the basis of the AHL being an integral representative of North American hockey culture. One Swiss commentator, Rainer Maria Salzgeber, also pointed out in an interview that considering the low probability of an NHL team playing at the Spengler Cup, the AHL is the next best thing, together with Team Canada, which is composed of Canadians playing for European clubs, in terms of bringing North American-style hockey to Davos. Then-AHL president David Andrews stated in 2018 that the Spengler Cup is "an opportunity to do something really special for...players" and that “It is a really unique experience for a player "

An alternative proposed by Spengler Cup organizing committee Chairman Marc Gianola after the tournament's 2022 edition is to invite an NCAA team, due to the NCAA's less grueling schedule.
