= Stacy Roest =

Canadian ice hockey player

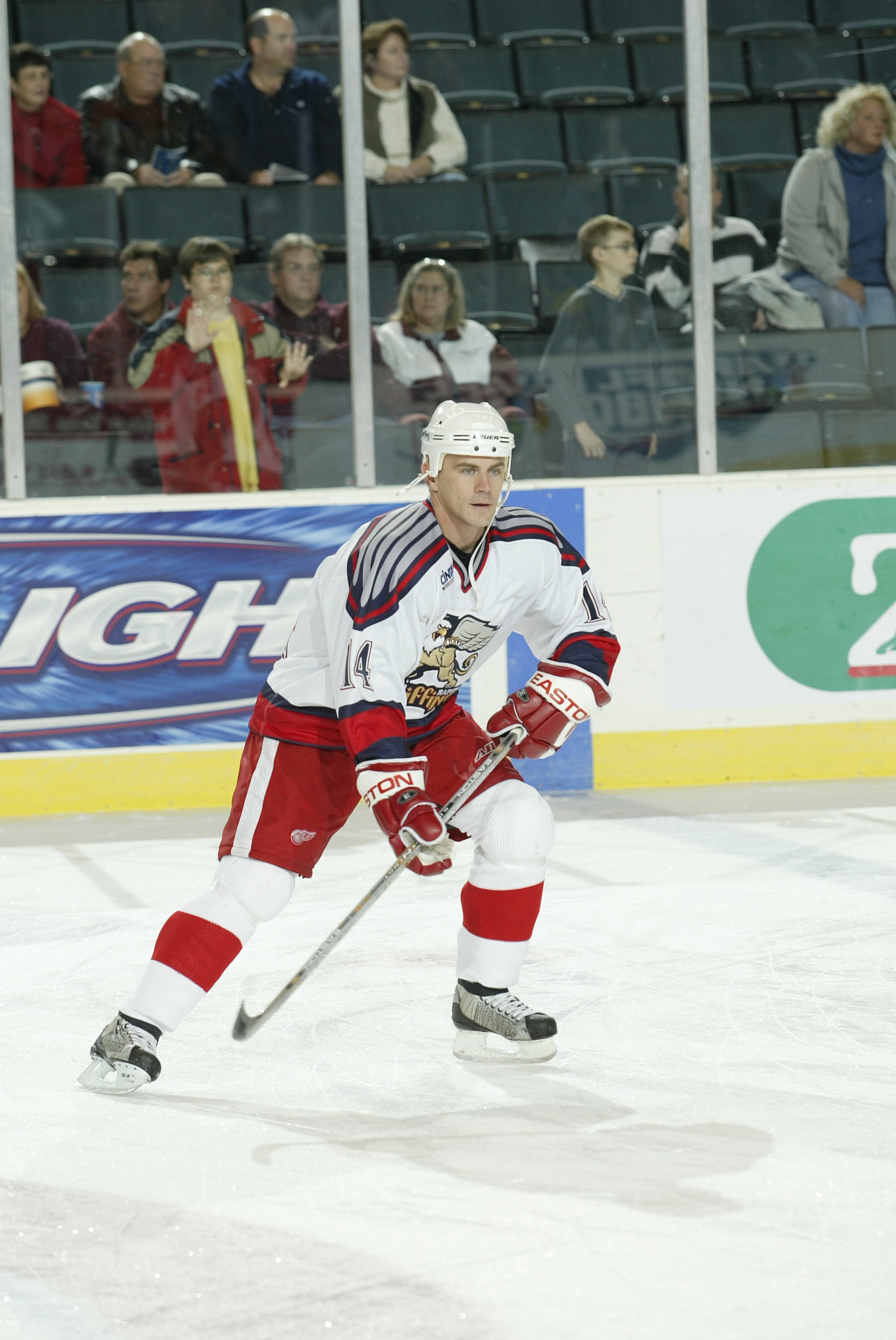
- Roest with the Grand Rapids Griffins during the 2002–03 season
- Born: March 15, 1974 (age 52) Lethbridge, Alberta, Canada
- Height: 5 ft 9 in (175 cm)
- Weight: 190 lb (86 kg; 13 st 8 lb)
- Position: Centre
- Shot: Right
- Played for: Detroit Red Wings; Minnesota Wild; Rapperswil-Jona Lakers
- National team: Canada
- NHL draft: Undrafted
- Playing career: 1995–2012

Stacy Roest (born March 15, 1974) is a Canadian former professional hockey player who played five seasons in the National Hockey League (NHL) for the Detroit Red Wings and Minnesota Wild.

== Playing career ==
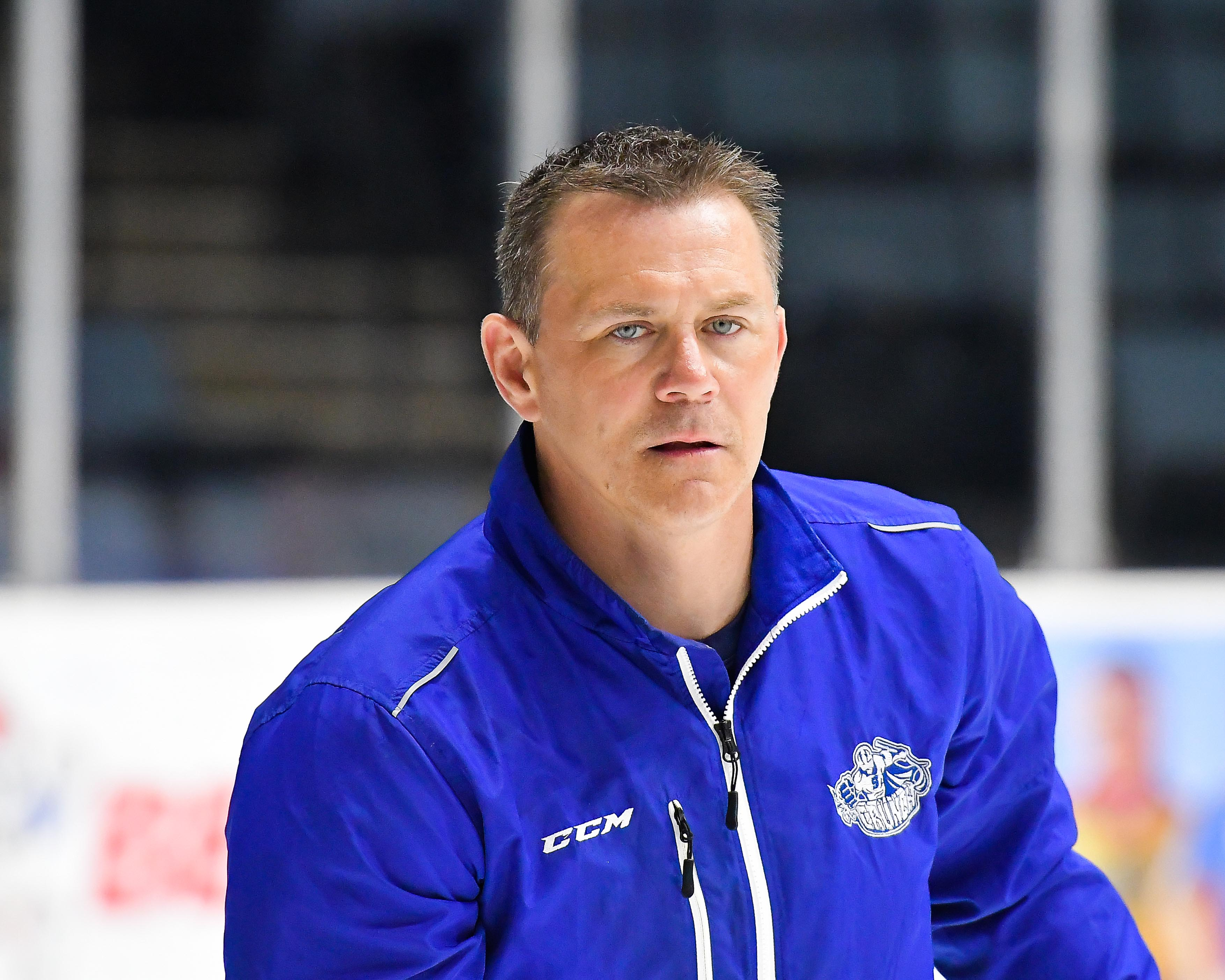
Roest with the Syracuse Crunch in 2017

He played the final nine seasons of his playing career with the Rapperswil-Jona Lakers of the National League A, the top league in Switzerland. He played in the Western Hockey League, the American Hockey League and the National Hockey League.

He captained Team Canada at the Spengler Cup in 2012.

Roest served as the Director of Player Development for the Tampa Bay Lightning of the National Hockey League from 2013–2025, along with being the Lightning's Assistant General Manager and the General Manager of the Syracuse Crunch from 2019–2025.

On January 13, 2026, Roest was hired by the Buffalo Sabres as a pro scout. On June 30, 2026, he was promoted by the Sabres to serve as the team's director of player personnel, in addition to being named as the General Manager of the Rochester Americans.

== Career statistics ==
| | | | Regular season | | | | | Playoffs |
| Season | Team | League | GP | G | A | Pts | PIM | GP | G | A | Pts | PIM |
|---|---|---|---|---|---|---|---|---|---|---|---|---|
| 1990–91 | Lethbridge Y's Men | AMHL | 34 | 22 | 50 | 72 | 38 | — | — | — | — | — |
| 1990–91 | Medicine Hat Tigers | WHL | 5 | 1 | 2 | 3 | 0 | 12 | 5 | 5 | 10 | 4 |
| 1991–92 | Medicine Hat Tigers | WHL | 72 | 22 | 43 | 65 | 20 | 4 | 2 | 1 | 3 | 0 |
| 1992–93 | Medicine Hat Tigers | WHL | 72 | 33 | 73 | 106 | 30 | 10 | 3 | 10 | 13 | 6 |
| 1993–94 | Medicine Hat Tigers | WHL | 72 | 48 | 72 | 120 | 48 | 3 | 1 | 0 | 1 | 4 |
| 1994–95 | Adirondack Red Wings | AHL | 3 | 0 | 0 | 0 | 0 | — | — | — | — | — |
| 1994–95 | Medicine Hat Tigers | WHL | 69 | 37 | 78 | 115 | 32 | 5 | 2 | 7 | 9 | 2 |
| 1995–96 | Adirondack Red Wings | AHL | 76 | 16 | 39 | 55 | 40 | 3 | 0 | 0 | 0 | 2 |
| 1996–97 | Adirondack Red Wings | AHL | 78 | 25 | 41 | 66 | 30 | 4 | 1 | 1 | 2 | 0 |
| 1997–98 | Adirondack Red Wings | AHL | 80 | 34 | 58 | 92 | 30 | 3 | 2 | 1 | 3 | 6 |
| 1998–99 | Adirondack Red Wings | AHL | 2 | 0 | 1 | 1 | 0 | — | — | — | — | — |
| 1998–99 | Detroit Red Wings | NHL | 59 | 4 | 8 | 12 | 14 | — | — | — | — | — |
| 1999–00 | Detroit Red Wings | NHL | 49 | 7 | 9 | 16 | 12 | 3 | 0 | 0 | 0 | 0 |
| 2000–01 | Minnesota Wild | NHL | 76 | 7 | 20 | 27 | 20 | — | — | — | — | — |
| 2001–02 | Minnesota Wild | NHL | 58 | 10 | 11 | 21 | 8 | — | — | — | — | — |
| 2002–03 | Grand Rapids Griffins | AHL | 70 | 24 | 48 | 72 | 28 | 15 | 10 | 6 | 16 | 8 |
| 2002–03 | Detroit Red Wings | NHL | 2 | 0 | 0 | 0 | 0 | — | — | — | — | — |
| 2003–04 | Rapperswil-Jona Lakers | NLA | 48 | 17 | 32 | 49 | 16 | — | — | — | — | — |
| 2004–05 | Rapperswil-Jona Lakers | NLA | 44 | 17 | 38 | 55 | 10 | — | — | — | — | — |
| 2005–06 | Rapperswil-Jona Lakers | NLA | 44 | 16 | 19 | 35 | 32 | 12 | 2 | 7 | 9 | 6 |
| 2006–07 | Rapperswil-Jona Lakers | NLA | 40 | 14 | 36 | 50 | 36 | 7 | 1 | 5 | 6 | 6 |
| 2007–08 | Rapperswil-Jona Lakers | NLA | 49 | 16 | 38 | 54 | 26 | 5 | 0 | 3 | 3 | 14 |
| 2008–09 | Rapperswil-Jona Lakers | NLA | 50 | 17 | 46 | 63 | 50 | — | — | — | — | — |
| 2009–10 | Rapperswil-Jona Lakers | NLA | 49 | 15 | 37 | 52 | 26 | — | — | — | — | — |
| 2010–11 | Rapperswil-Jona Lakers | NLA | 50 | 14 | 39 | 53 | 18 | — | — | — | — | — |
| 2011–12 | Rapperswil-Jona Lakers | NLA | 45 | 7 | 21 | 28 | 10 | — | — | — | — | — |
| NHL totals | | | 244 | 28 | 48 | 76 | 54 | 3 | 0 | 0 | 0 | 0 |

== Awards and honors ==
| Award | Year |
|---|---|
WHL
| East First All-Star Team | 1994 |
| East Second All-Star Team | 1995 |
NLA
| Most assists (39) | 2011 |
Spengler Cup
| All-Star Team | 2004 |
