= 1992 Spengler Cup =

1992 Spengler Cup Davos, Switzerland
Tournament details
- Host country: Switzerland
- Venue(s): Eisstadion Davos, Davos
- Dates: 26 – 31 December 1992
- Teams: 5

Final positions
- Champions: Team Canada (4th title)
- Runners-up: (Sweden) Färjestads BK

Tournament statistics
- Games played: 11
- Goals scored: 97 (8.82 per game)
- Scoring leader: Håkan Loob (8 pts)

The 1992 Spengler Cup was held in Davos, Switzerland from December 26 to December 31, 1992. All matches were played at HC Davos's home arena, Eisstadion Davos. The final was won 6-5 by Team Canada over Färjestads BK.

== Teams participating ==
- Team Canada
- (Sweden) Färjestads BK
- (Germany) EC Hedos München
- (Russia) HC CSKA Moscow
- (Switzerland) HC Fribourg-Gottéron

== Tournament ==
=== Round-Robin results ===
Team	Pld	W	L	GF	GA	GD	Pts
Team Canada	4	3	1	21	17	+4	6
(Sweden) Färjestads BK	4	3	1	21	16	+5	6
(Germany) EC Hedos München	4	2	2	17	19	−2	4
(Russia) HC CSKA Moscow	4	2	2	14	14	0	4
(Switzerland) HC Fribourg-Gottéron	4	0	4	13	20	−7	0

December 26, 1992	(Switzerland) HC Fribourg-Gottéron	1–3	(Russia) HC CSKA Moscow	Eisstadion Davos

Celio (57:58) / Goals / Vinokurov (5:28), Vinokurov (52:08), Vinokurov (59:56)

December 26, 1992	(Sweden) Färjestads BK	5–3	(Germany) EC Hedos München	Eisstadion Davos

December 27, 1992	(Sweden) Färjestads BK	3–5	Team Canada	Eisstadion Davos

December 27, 1992	(Switzerland) HC Fribourg-Gottéron	3–5	(Germany) EC Hedos München	Eisstadion Davos

December 28, 1992	(Switzerland) HC Fribourg-Gottéron	5–7	(Sweden) Färjestads BK	Eisstadion Davos

December 28, 1992	(Russia) HC CSKA Moscow	5–3	Team Canada

Navestnikov (9:14), Vinokurov (12:15), Ivanov (28:20), Potaichuk (55:13), Kudashov (59:02). Goals McLaren (25:38), Yaremchuk (46:58), Lukowich (52:21). Eisstadion Davos

December 29, 1992	Team Canada	8–5	(Germany) EC Hedos München	Eisstadion Davos

December 29, 1992	(Russia) HC CSKA Moscow	3–6	(Sweden) Färjestads BK	Eisstadion Davos

December 30, 1992	(Germany) EC Hedos München	4–3	(Russia) HC CSKA Moscow	Eisstadion Davos

December 30, 1992	(Switzerland) HC Fribourg-Gottéron	4–5 OT	Team Canada	Eisstadion Davos

=== Finals ===
December 31, 1992; 12:00	Team Canada	6 – 5 OT (1–1, 2–2, 2–2, 1-0)	(Sweden) Färjestads BK	Eisstadion Davos

=== Round-Robin results ===
Team	Pld	W	L	GF	GA	GD	Pts
(Russia) Avtomobilist Yekaterinburg	4	3	1	21	17	+4	6
(Czech Republic) Slovan Bratislava	4	3	1	21	16	+5	6
(Norway) Volerenga	4	2	2	17	19	−2	4
(France) Brûleurs de Loups	4	2	2	14	14	0	4
(Hungary) Ferencvárosi	4	0	4	13	20	−7	0

=== Finals ===
December 31, 1992; 17:00	(Russia) Avtomobilist Yekaterinburg	6 – 5 OT (1–1, 2–2, 2–2, 1-0)	(Czech Republic) Slovan Bratislava	Eisstadion Davos
