= 1997 Spengler Cup =

1997 Spengler Cup Davos, Switzerland
Tournament details
- Host country: Switzerland
- Venue(s): Eisstadion Davos, Davos
- Dates: 26 – 31 December 1997
- Teams: 5

Final positions
- Champions: Team Canada (7th title)
- Runner-up: (Sweden) Färjestad BK

Tournament statistics
- Games played: 11
- Goals scored: 76 (6.91 per game)
- Scoring leader(s): Todd Elik (8 pts)

The 1997 Spengler Cup was held in Davos, Switzerland from December 26 to December 31, 1997. All matches were played at host HC Davos's home Eisstadion Davos. The final was won 8–3 by Team Canada over Färjestad BK.

Team Canada was coached by Andy Murray.

== Teams participating ==
- Team Canada
- (Switzerland) HC Davos (host)
- (Finland) Jokerit
- (Sweden) Färjestad BK
- (Germany) Mannheimer ERC

== Tournament ==
=== Round-Robin results ===
Team	Pld	W	L	GF	GA	GD	Pts
Team Canada	4	3	1	14	7	+7	6
(Sweden) Färjestad BK	4	3	1	16	13	+3	6
(Finland) Jokerit	4	2	2	13	12	+1	4
(Germany) Mannheimer ERC	4	2	2	11	14	−3	4
(Switzerland) HC Davos	4	0	4	11	19	−8	0

All times local (CET/UTC +1)

December 26, 1997; 15:30	(Switzerland) HC Davos	1–3	Team Canada	Eisstadion Davos

December 26, 1997; 20:45	(Sweden) Färjestad BK	3–2	(Finland) Jokerit	Eisstadion Davos

December 27, 1997; 15:30	(Germany) Mannheimer ERC	3–1	(Switzerland) HC Davos	Eisstadion Davos

December 27, 1997; 20:45	Team Canada	1–3	(Sweden) Färjestad BK	Eisstadion Davos

December 28, 1997; 15:30	(Finland) Jokerit	3–2	(Germany) Mannheimer ERC	Eisstadion Davos

December 28, 1997; 20:45	(Switzerland) HC Davos	5–7	(Sweden) Färjestad BK	Eisstadion Davos

December 29, 1997; 15:30	Team Canada	7–1	(Germany) Mannheimer ERC	Eisstadion Davos

December 29, 1997; 20:45	(Finland) Jokerit	6–4	(Switzerland) HC Davos	Eisstadion Davos

December 30, 1997; 15:30	(Sweden) Färjestad BK	3–5	(Germany) Mannheimer ERC	Eisstadion Davos

December 30, 1997; 20:45	Team Canada	3–2	(Finland) Jokerit	Eisstadion Davos

=== Finals ===
December 31, 1997; 12:00	Team Canada	8–3	(Sweden) Färjestad BK	Eisstadion Davos
