= 1999 Spengler Cup =

1999 Spengler Cup Davos, Switzerland
Tournament details
- Host country: Switzerland
- Venue(s): Eisstadion Davos, Davos
- Dates: 26 – 31 December 1999
- Teams: 5

Final positions
- Champions: (Germany) Kölner Haie (1st title)
- Runner-up: (Russia) Metallurg Magnitogorsk

Tournament statistics
- Games played: 11
- Goals scored: 79 (7.18 per game)
- Attendance: 72,950 (6,632 per game)
- Scoring leader(s): Luciano Borsato (7 pts)

The 1999 Spengler Cup was held in Davos, Switzerland from December 26 to December 31, 1999. All matches were played at HC Davos's home arena, Eisstadion Davos. The final was won 6–2 by Kölner Haie over Metallurg Magnitogorsk.

== Teams participating ==
- (Germany) Kölner Haie
- (Russia) Metallurg Magnitogorsk
- Team Canada
- (Switzerland) HC Davos
- (Sweden) Färjestads BK

== Tournament ==
=== Round-Robin results ===
| Team | Pld | W | OTW | OTL | L | GF | GA | GD | Pts |
|---|---|---|---|---|---|---|---|---|---|
| (Germany) Kölner Haie | 4 | 2 | 1 | 1 | 0 | 15 | 11 | +4 | 7 |
| (Russia) Metallurg Magnitogorsk | 4 | 2 | 1 | 0 | 1 | 12 | 9 | +3 | 6 |
| Team Canada | 4 | 1 | 1 | 1 | 1 | 14 | 15 | −1 | 5 |
| (Switzerland) HC Davos | 4 | 1 | 0 | 2 | 1 | 15 | 17 | −2 | 4 |
| (Sweden) Färjestads BK | 4 | 0 | 1 | 0 | 3 | 15 | 19 | −4 | 2 |

All times local (CET/UTC +1)

| December 26, 1999; 15:30 | (Switzerland) HC Davos | 4–2 | (Russia) Metallurg Magnitogorsk | Eisstadion Davos |

| December 26, 1999; 20:45 | (Sweden) Färjestads BK | 3–5 | (Germany) Kölner Haie | Eisstadion Davos |

| December 27, 1999; 15:30 | Team Canada | 4–3 OT | (Switzerland) HC Davos | Eisstadion Davos |

| December 27, 1999; 20:45 | (Russia) Metallurg Magnitogorsk | 3–1 | (Sweden) Färjestads BK | Eisstadion Davos |

| December 28, 1999; 15:30 | (Sweden) Färjestads BK | 5–6 | Team Canada | Eisstadion Davos |

| December 28, 1999; 20:45 | (Russia) Metallurg Magnitogorsk | 3–2 SO | (Germany) Kölner Haie | Eisstadion Davos |

| December 29, 1999; 15:30 | (Germany) Kölner Haie | 5–3 | (Switzerland) HC Davos | Eisstadion Davos |

| December 29, 1999; 20:45 | Team Canada | 2–4 | (Russia) Metallurg Magnitogorsk | Eisstadion Davos |

| December 30, 1999; 15:30 | (Germany) Kölner Haie | 3–2 SO | Team Canada | Eisstadion Davos |

| December 30, 1999; 20:45 | (Switzerland) HC Davos | 5–6 OT | (Sweden) Färjestads BK | Eisstadion Davos |

=== Finals ===
| December 31, 1999; 12:00 | (Germany) Kölner Haie | 6 – 2 (2–1, 2–1, 2–0) | (Russia) Metallurg Magnitogorsk | Eisstadion Davos |
