= 1989 Spengler Cup =

The 1989 Spengler Cup was held in Davos, Switzerland from December 26 to December 31, 1989. All matches were played at HC Davos's home arena, Eisstadion Davos. HC Spartak Moscow won the tournament with a 5-3 victory in the final over Färjestad BK. This was their fourth tournament win, after 1980, 1981, and 1985.

== Teams participating ==
- (Soviet Union) HC Spartak Moscow
- Team Canada
- (Sweden) Färjestad BK
- (United States) USA Selects
- (Switzerland) HC Davos

== Tournament ==
=== Round-Robin results ===
Team	Pld	W	L	GF	GA	GD	Pts
(Soviet Union) HC Spartak Moscow	4	3	1	21	14	+7	6
(Sweden) Färjestads BK	4	2	2	21	19	+2	4
Team Canada	4	2	2	19	19	0	4
(United States) USA Selects	4	2	2	23	22	+1	4
(Switzerland) HC Davos	4	1	3	17	27	−10	2

December, 1989	(Soviet Union) HC Spartak Moscow	4–1	Team Canada	Eisstadion Davos

December, 1989	(Switzerland) HC Davos	5–7	(Sweden) Färjestads BK	Eisstadion Davos

December, 1989	(Switzerland) HC Davos	3–9	(United States) US Selects	Eisstadion Davos

December, 1989	(Sweden) Färjestads BK	3–4	(Soviet Union) HC Spartak Moscow	Eisstadion Davos

December, 1989	Team Canada	7–5	(Sweden) Färjestads BK	Eisstadion Davos

December, 1989	(Soviet Union) HC Spartak Moscow	7–3	(United States) US Selects	Eisstadion Davos

December, 1989	(Switzerland) HC Davos	7–6	(Soviet Union) HC Spartak Moscow	Eisstadion Davos

December, 1989	Team Canada	6–8	(United States) US Selects	Eisstadion Davos

December, 1989	(Sweden) Färjestads BK	6–3	(United States) US Selects	Eisstadion Davos

December, 1989	(Switzerland) EHC Kloten	2–5	Team Canada	Eisstadion Davos

=== Finals ===
December 31, 1989; 12:00	(Soviet Union) HC Spartak Moscow	5–3; 1–1, 4–0, 0–2	(Sweden) Färjestads BK	Eisstadion Davos
