= 2008 Spengler Cup =

2008 Spengler Cup Davos, Switzerland
Tournament details
- Host country: Switzerland
- Venue(s): Vaillant Arena, Davos
- Dates: 26 – 31 December 2008
- Teams: 5

Final positions
- Champions: (Russia) HC Dynamo Moscow (2nd title)
- Runner-up: Team Canada

Tournament statistics
- Games played: 11
- Goals scored: 81 (7.36 per game)
- Scoring leader(s): Dmitri Afanasenkov (7 pts); Mattias Weinhandl (7 pts)

The 2008 Spengler Cup was held in Davos, Switzerland from December 26 to December 31, 2008. All matches were played at host HC Davos's home Vaillant Arena. The final was won 5-3 by HC Dynamo Moscow over Team Canada.

== Teams participating ==
- Team Canada
- (Switzerland) HC Davos (host)
- (Germany) ERC Ingolstadt
- (Czech Republic) HC Energie Karlovy Vary
- (Russia) HC Dynamo Moscow

== Tournament ==
=== Round-Robin results ===
Team	Pld	W	OTW	OTL	L	GF	GA	GD	Pts
Team Canada	4	3	0	1	0	19	12	+7	7
(Russia) HC Dynamo Moscow	4	3	0	0	1	18	14	+4	6
(Switzerland) HC Davos	4	1	1	0	2	14	14	0	4
(Czech Republic) HC Energie Karlovy Vary	4	1	0	0	3	10	13	−3	2
(Germany) ERC Ingolstadt	4	1	0	0	3	12	20	−8	2

All times local (CET/UTC +1)

December 26, 2008; 15:00	(Russia) HC Dynamo Moscow	4–1	(Switzerland) HC Davos	Vaillant Arena

December 26, 2008; 20:15	Team Canada	3–1	(Czech Republic) HC Energie Karlovy Vary	Vaillant Arena

December 27, 2008; 15:00	(Czech Republic) HC Energie Karlovy Vary	5–2	(Germany) ERC Ingolstadt	Vaillant Arena

December 27, 2008; 20:15	Team Canada	5–6 SO	(Switzerland) HC Davos	Vaillant Arena

December 28, 2008; 15:00	(Switzerland) HC Davos	4–1	(Czech Republic) HC Energie Karlovy Vary	Vaillant Arena

December 28, 2008; 20:15	(Germany) ERC Ingolstadt	4–7	(Russia) HC Dynamo Moscow	Vaillant Arena

December 29, 2008; 15:00	(Germany) ERC Ingolstadt	2–5	Team Canada	Vaillant Arena

December 29, 2008; 20:15	(Czech Republic) HC Energie Karlovy Vary	3–4	(Russia) HC Dynamo Moscow	Vaillant Arena

December 30, 2008; 15:00	(Russia) HC Dynamo Moscow	3–6	Team Canada	Vaillant Arena

December 30, 2008; 20:15	(Switzerland) HC Davos	3–4	(Germany) ERC Ingolstadt	Vaillant Arena

=== Finals ===
December 31, 2008; 12:00	Team Canada	3–5	(Russia) HC Dynamo Moscow	Vaillant Arena

DuPont 39:18 (PP2); Domenichelli 39:36 (PP1); Robitaille 49:17 / Goals / Cajanek 9:19 (SH1), 28:24, 40:42; Nepryaev 28:59 (PP1); Pestuschko 57:13
