= 2007 Spengler Cup =

2007 Spengler Cup Davos, Switzerland
Tournament details
- Host country: Switzerland
- Venue(s): Vaillant Arena, Davos
- Dates: 26 – 31 December 2007
- Teams: 5

Final positions
- Champions: Team Canada (11th title)
- Runners-up: (Russia) Salavat Yulaev Ufa

Tournament statistics
- Games played: 11
- Goals scored: 68 (6.18 per game)
- Scoring leader: Alexander Perezhogin (6 pts)

The 2007 Spengler Cup was held in Davos, Switzerland from December 26 to December 31, 2007. All matches were played at host HC Davos's home Vaillant Arena. The final was won 2-1 by Team Canada over Salavat Yulaev Ufa.

== Teams participating ==
- Team Canada
- (Switzerland) HC Davos (host)
- (Germany) Adler Mannheim
- (Czech Republic) HC Möller Pardubice
- (Russia) Salavat Yulaev Ufa

== Tournament ==
=== Round-Robin results ===
Team	Pld	W	OTW	OTL	L	GF	GA	GD	Pts
Team Canada	4	3	1	0	0	17	9	+8	8
(Russia) Salavat Yulaev Ufa	4	2	0	0	2	18	10	+8	4
(Germany) Adler Mannheim	4	2	0	0	2	10	15	−5	4
(Czech Republic) HC Möller Pardubice	4	1	0	1	2	9	14	−5	3
(Switzerland) HC Davos	4	1	0	0	3	11	17	−6	2

All times local (CET/UTC +1)

December 26, 2007; 15:00	(Germany) Adler Mannheim	3–2	(Switzerland) HC Davos	Vaillant Arena

December 26, 2007; 20:15	Team Canada	4–3 SO	(Czech Republic) HC Möller Pardubice	Vaillant Arena

December 27, 2007; 15:00	(Czech Republic) HC Möller Pardubice	0–5	(Russia) Salavat Yulaev Ufa	Vaillant Arena

December 27, 2007; 20:15	(Switzerland) HC Davos	2–6	Team Canada	Vaillant Arena

December 28, 2007; 15:00	(Switzerland) HC Davos	1–3	(Czech Republic) HC Möller Pardubice	Vaillant Arena

December 28, 2007; 20:15	(Germany) Adler Mannheim	1–6	(Russia) Salavat Yulaev Ufa	Vaillant Arena

December 29, 2007; 15:00	(Russia) Salavat Yulaev Ufa	2–3	Team Canada	Vaillant Arena

December 29, 2007; 20:15	(Czech Republic) HC Möller Pardubice	3–4	(Germany) Adler Mannheim	Vaillant Arena

December 30, 2007; 15:00	Team Canada	4–2	(Germany) Adler Mannheim	Vaillant Arena

December 30, 2007; 20:15	(Russia) Salavat Yulaev Ufa	5–6	(Switzerland) HC Davos	Vaillant Arena

=== Finals ===
December 31, 2007; 12:00	Team Canada	2–1	(Russia) Salavat Yulaev Ufa	Vaillant Arena

27'00 Kirby Law; 30'05 Ryan Keller / Goals / 29'35 Alexander Perezhogin
