= Steve Montador =

Canadian ice hockey player (1979–2015)

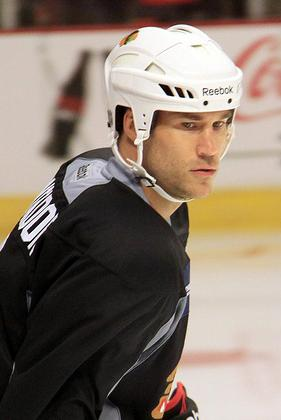
- Montador while practicing with the Blackhawks in September 2011
- Born: December 21, 1979 Vancouver, British Columbia, Canada
- Died: February 15, 2015 (aged 35) Mississauga, Ontario, Canada
- Height: 6 ft 0 in (183 cm)
- Weight: 211 lb (96 kg; 15 st 1 lb)
- Position: Defence
- Shot: Right
- Played for: Calgary Flames; Mulhouse Scorpions; Florida Panthers; Anaheim Ducks; Boston Bruins; Buffalo Sabres; Chicago Blackhawks; Medveščak Zagreb
- NHL draft: Undrafted
- Playing career: 2000–2014

Steven Richard "The Matador" Montador (December 21, 1979 – February 15, 2015) was a Canadian professional ice hockey defenceman who played 571 games in the National Hockey League (NHL) for the Calgary Flames, Florida Panthers, Anaheim Ducks, Boston Bruins, Buffalo Sabres and Chicago Blackhawks before ending his career in 2014 as a member of Medveščak Zagreb of the Kontinental Hockey League (KHL).

An undrafted player, Montador signed with the Flames as a free agent in 2000 and began his professional career with their American Hockey League (AHL) affiliate, the Saint John Flames, and was a member of their 2001 Calder Cup championship team. Montador also played with France's Ligue Magnus champion Mulhouse Scorpions in 2004–05.

== Playing career ==
=== Junior and American Hockey League ===
Montador played minor ice hockey with the Mississauga Senators of the Greater Toronto Hockey League (GTHL). He played in the 1993 Quebec International Pee-Wee Hockey Tournament with the Toronto Marlboros minor ice hockey team.

He began his junior hockey career in 1995–96 with the St. Michael's Buzzers of the junior A Ontario Provincial Junior Hockey League (OPJHL). He moved up to the Ontario Hockey League (OHL) the following season and, through a four-year major junior career with the North Bay Centennials, Erie Otters and Peterborough Petes, scored 174 points and 429 penalty minutes in 251 games. In his final junior season, 1999–2000, Montador was the Petes' leading scorer among defencemen with 56 points.

Despite his play in the OHL, Montador went unselected in the NHL entry draft, and ended his junior career as a free agent. He was signed by the Calgary Flames to a professional tryout offer and joined Calgary's American Hockey League (AHL) affiliate, the Saint John Flames, where he made his professional debut on April 13, 2000, in a playoff game against the Lowell Lock Monsters. Montador earned a contract from the Flames and was assigned to Saint John for the 2000–01 season. He recorded 1 goal and 6 assists for Saint John in 58 regular season games, and added 8 assists in 19 playoff games. Montador and the Flames reached the league championship series against the Wilkes-Barre/Scranton Penguins and won the city's first Calder Cup championship with a 4–2 series win.

=== National Hockey League ===
Montador spent the majority of the 2001–02 season with Saint John where he scored 9 goals and 25 points in 67 games. He earned his first recall to Calgary early in the season and made his NHL debut on November 23, 2001 – and recorded his first point with an assist – against the Buffalo Sabres. Montador's first NHL goal came on January 8, 2002, against goaltender Garth Snow in a 5–2 victory over the New York Islanders, and he also played with Team Canada at the 2001 Spengler Cup. He appeared in 11 games for Calgary and recorded three points. In 2002–03, Montador again began the year with Saint John where, during one early-season contest, he tied an AHL record for shots in a game with 14. He was recalled to Calgary days later to replace defenceman Bob Boughner, who suffered a broken thumb. Montador remained with the Flames for the remainder of the season; he recorded a goal and an assist in 50 games.

Staying with the Flames for the entire 2003–04 season, Montador was often the Flames' extra defenceman and appeared in just 26 regular season contests, during which he scored a goal and two assists. Injuries to defencemen Toni Lydman and Denis Gauthier created an opportunity for Montador to enter the lineup as a regular for most of the Flames' 2004 Stanley Cup playoff run. Montador and fellow extra defenceman Mike Commodore were nicknamed "the Doors" and both became key contributors to the Flames' post-season success. Montador became a playoff hero for the team after he scored the overtime winning goal in game one of the Western Conference Final against the San Jose Sharks. The Flames reached the Stanley Cup Finals, but were defeated in seven games by the Tampa Bay Lightning.

As a labour dispute ultimately led to the cancellation of the 2004–05 NHL season, Montador was one of many players who spent the season in Europe; He signed a deal to play with the Mulhouse Scorpions of France's Ligue Magnus and brought Flames teammate Steve Reinprecht over as well. Montador appeared in 15 games with Mulhouse where he scored 1 goal and added 7 assists. The Scorpions went on to win the Ligue Magnus title. Montador returned to Calgary to begin the 2005–06 season after the league and players resolved their dispute, however head coach Darryl Sutter struggled to find a place in the lineup for him, and by the start of December, Montador had played only seven games. Hoping to improve his team and to give Montador a place to play regularly, Sutter and the Flames traded Montador, along with Dustin Johner, to the Florida Panthers in exchange for Kristian Huselius on December 2, 2005.

Montador played full-time on the Panthers' defence; he finished the 2005–06 season with 58 games played combined between the two teams, scored 2 goals and added 5 assists. He then recorded nine points in 72 games in 2006–07 and then set personal highs in games played (73), goals (8) and points (23). Following the season, Montador left the Panthers and returned to the west as he signed a one-year contract with the Anaheim Ducks. His stay in Anaheim was short lived as, after recording 20 points in 65 games for the team, the Ducks traded Montador on March 4, 2009, to the Boston Bruins in exchange for Petteri Nokelainen. He finished the regular season with an assist in 13 games, then added four points in 11 playoff games.

Again a free agent, Montador signed a two-year, $3.1 million contract with the Buffalo Sabres. The team hoped that he could add a physical presence to their team after losing Jaroslav Špaček to the Montreal Canadiens. Montador recorded 23 points in 78 games for Buffalo in 2009–10 then posted the highest totals of his career of 21 assists and 26 points, in 73 games, in 2010–11. However, his play declined late in the season, and he was ultimately left out of the lineup as a healthy scratch for Buffalo's deciding game seven (a loss) to the Philadelphia Flyers; Consequently, the team opted not to re-sign Montador and traded his rights to the Chicago Blackhawks on June 28, 2011, for a seventh round selection in the 2011 NHL entry draft. Chicago immediately signed him to a four-year, $11 million contract.

Montador appeared in 52 games for the Blackhawks in 2011–12, scored five goals and added nine assists. However his season was ended after he suffered a serious concussion during a game.

He required almost a full year to recover from the injury and as a result missed the final weeks of the season and the playoffs for the Blackhawks and played only 14 games for Chicago's AHL affiliate, the Rockford IceHogs late in the 2012–13 season before Chicago opted to buy-out the remaining two years of his contract. Montador left the NHL to join Croatian team Medveščak Zagreb of Kontinental Hockey League (KHL). He appeared in 11 games for Medveščak and recorded three assists in what was the final season of his career.

== Personal life ==
Off the ice, Montador was a supporter of the Right to Play charity and took trips to Africa to work with children as part of the organization's events. He was also a member of the National Hockey League Players' Association's bargaining committee during the 2012–13 NHL lockout.

Montador spoke openly of the depression he suffered following his concussion issues in Chicago, and according to his brother Chris, had spent a great deal of time researching the effects of head injuries. Chris noted that both he and his brother had suffered concussions as children, and that Steve had promised to donate his brain to medical researchers studying brain issues.

== Death ==
On February 15, 2015, Montador was found dead in his Mississauga home. According to his brother, "he just either stopped breathing or his heart went". Four days after his death, Montador's girlfriend gave birth to their son.

Montador's death at age 35 was a shock to players throughout the NHL; many of his former teammates spoke positively of his influence and attitude. Daniel Carcillo reflected on his friendship with Montador in an interview for The Players' Tribune and cited Montador as a positive influence who helped him overcome his substance abuse problems. Carcillo noted that he witnessed Montador's mental state slowly deteriorate before his death and called upon the NHL community to establish a formal exit-procedure for players having post-concussion syndrome. Chris Montador had also noted a change in Steve's behavior prior to his death.

Researchers studying Montador's brain noted that he had suffered from chronic traumatic encephalopathy (CTE), a degenerative brain condition that doctors have noted is caused by concussions. As a consequence of the revelation, lawyers representing his estate stated their intention to file a lawsuit against the NHL. That lawsuit was terminated in late 2020, but was renewed in October 2021.

== Career statistics ==
			Regular season					Playoffs
Season	Team	League	GP	G	A	Pts	PIM	GP	G	A	Pts	PIM
1996–97	North Bay Centennials	OHL	63	7	28	35	129	—	—	—	—	—
1997–98	North Bay Centennials	OHL	37	5	16	21	54	—	—	—	—	—
1997–98	Erie Otters	OHL	26	3	17	20	35	7	1	1	2	8
1998–99	Erie Otters	OHL	61	9	33	42	114	5	0	2	2	9
1999–00	Peterborough Petes	OHL	64	14	42	56	97	5	0	2	2	4
1999–00	Saint John Flames	AHL	—	—	—	—	—	2	0	0	0	0
2000–01	Saint John Flames	AHL	58	1	6	7	95	19	0	8	8	13
2001–02	Saint John Flames	AHL	67	9	16	25	107	—	—	—	—	—
2001–02	Calgary Flames	NHL	11	1	2	3	26	—	—	—	—	—
2002–03	Saint John Flames	AHL	11	1	7	8	20	—	—	—	—	—
2002–03	Calgary Flames	NHL	50	1	1	2	114	—	—	—	—	—
2003–04	Calgary Flames	NHL	26	1	2	3	50	20	1	2	3	6
2004–05	Mulhouse Scorpions	FRA	15	1	7	8	69	—	—	—	—	—
2005–06	Calgary Flames	NHL	7	1	0	1	11	—	—	—	—	—
2005–06	Florida Panthers	NHL	51	1	5	6	68	—	—	—	—	—
2006–07	Florida Panthers	NHL	72	1	8	9	119	—	—	—	—	—
2007–08	Florida Panthers	NHL	73	8	15	23	73	—	—	—	—	—
2008–09	Anaheim Ducks	NHL	65	4	16	20	125	—	—	—	—	—
2008–09	Boston Bruins	NHL	13	0	1	1	18	11	1	2	3	18
2009–10	Buffalo Sabres	NHL	78	5	18	23	75	6	1	0	1	4
2010–11	Buffalo Sabres	NHL	73	5	21	26	83	6	0	1	1	8
2011–12	Chicago Blackhawks	NHL	52	5	9	14	45	—	—	—	—	—
2012–13	Rockford IceHogs	AHL	14	2	3	5	13	—	—	—	—	—
2013–14	KHL Medveščak Zagreb	KHL	11	0	3	3	33	—	—	—	—	—
NHL totals			571	33	98	131	807	43	3	5	8	36
