= 1991 Spengler Cup =

1991 Spengler Cup Davos, Switzerland
Tournament details
- Host country: Switzerland
- Venue(s): Eisstadion Davos, Davos
- Dates: 26 – 31 December 1991
- Teams: 5

Final positions
- Champions: (Russia) CSKA Moscow (1st title)
- Runners-up: (Switzerland) HC Lugano

Tournament statistics
- Games played: 11
- Goals scored: 96 (8.73 per game)

The 1991 Spengler Cup was held in Davos, Switzerland from December 26 to December 31, 1991. All matches were played at HC Davos's home arena, Eisstadion Davos. The final was won 5-2 by CSKA Moscow over HC Lugano.

== Teams participating ==
- (Russia) CSKA Moscow
- (Switzerland) HC Lugano
- Team Canada
- (Sweden) Malmö IF
- (Germany) Mannheimer ERC

== Tournament ==
=== Round-Robin results ===
| Team | Pld | W | L | GF | GA | GD | Pts |
|---|---|---|---|---|---|---|---|
| (Russia) CSKA Moscow | 4 | 3 | 1 | 25 | 10 | +15 | 6 |
| (Switzerland) HC Lugano | 4 | 3 | 1 | 18 | 11 | +7 | 6 |
| Team Canada | 4 | 3 | 1 | 18 | 21 | −3 | 6 |
| (Sweden) Malmö IF | 4 | 1 | 3 | 17 | 21 | −4 | 2 |
| (Germany) Mannheimer ERC | 4 | 0 | 4 | 11 | 26 | −15 | 0 |

| December 26, 1991 | (Switzerland) HC Lugano | 6–0 | (Germany) Mannheimer ERC | Eisstadion Davos |

| December 26, 1991 | (Sweden) Malmö IF | 5–7 | Team Canada | Eisstadion Davos |

| December 27, 1991 | (Russia) CSKA Moscow | 9–1 | Team Canada | Eisstadion Davos |

| December 27, 1991 | (Switzerland) HC Lugano | 5–4 OT | (Sweden) Malmö IF | Eisstadion Davos |

| December 28, 1991 | (Sweden) Malmö IF | 2–5 | (Russia) CSKA Moscow | Eisstadion Davos |

| December 28, 1991 | (Germany) Mannheimer ERC | 5–7 | Team Canada | Eisstadion Davos |

| December 29, 1991 | Team Canada | 3–2 | (Switzerland) HC Lugano | Eisstadion Davos |

| December 29, 1991 | (Russia) HC CSKA Moscow | 7–2 | (Germany) Mannheimer ERC | Eisstadion Davos |

| December 30, 1991 | (Sweden) Malmö IF | 6–4 | (Germany) Mannheimer ERC | Eisstadion Davos |

| December 30, 1991 | (Switzerland) HC Lugano | 5–4 SO | (Russia) CSKA Moscow | Eisstadion Davos |

=== Finals ===
| December 31, 1991; 12:00 | (Russia) CSKA Moscow Chibirev - 3, Zubov, Petrov. | 5 – 2 (1–0, 4–1, 0–1) | (Switzerland) HC Lugano Eberle, Byakin | Eisstadion Davos |
