= 1990 Spengler Cup =

1990 Spengler Cup Davos, Switzerland
Tournament details
- Host country: Switzerland
- Venue(s): Eisstadion Davos, Davos
- Dates: 26 – 31 December 1990
- Teams: 5

Final positions
- Champions: (Soviet Union) HC Spartak Moscow (5th title)
- Runner-up: Team Canada

Tournament statistics
- Games played: 11
- Goals scored: 83 (7.55 per game)

The 1990 Spengler Cup was held in Davos, Switzerland from December 26 to December 31, 1990. All matches were played at HC Davos's home arena, Eisstadion Davos. The final was won 8-3 by HC Spartak Moscow over Team Canada.

== Teams participating ==
- (Soviet Union) HC Spartak Moscow
- Team Canada
- (Sweden) Färjestads BK
- (Czechoslovakia) HC Dukla Jihlava
- (Switzerland) EHC Kloten

== Tournament ==
=== Round-Robin results ===
Team	Pld	W	L	GF	GA	GD	Pts
(Soviet Union) HC Spartak Moscow	4	3	1	15	9	+6	6
Team Canada	4	3	1	18	10	+8	6
(Sweden) Färjestads BK	4	3	1	22	19	+3	6
(Czechoslovakia) HC Dukla Jihlava	4	1	3	9	15	−6	2
(Switzerland) EHC Kloten	4	0	4	8	19	−11	0

December, 1990	(Soviet Union) HC Spartak Moscow	2–3	Team Canada	Eisstadion Davos

December, 1990	(Switzerland) EHC Kloten	4–7	(Sweden) Färjestads BK	Eisstadion Davos

December, 1990	(Switzerland) EHC Kloten	1–2 SO	(Czechoslovakia) HC Dukla Jihlava	Eisstadion Davos

December, 1990	(Sweden) Färjestads BK	2–6	(Soviet Union) HC Spartak Moscow	Eisstadion Davos

December, 1990	Team Canada	2–6	(Sweden) Färjestads BK	Eisstadion Davos

December, 1990	(Soviet Union) HC Spartak Moscow	4–2	(Czechoslovakia) HC Dukla Jihlava	Eisstadion Davos

December, 1990	(Switzerland) EHC Kloten	2–3	(Soviet Union) HC Spartak Moscow	Eisstadion Davos

December, 1990	Team Canada	3–1	(Czechoslovakia) HC Dukla Jihlava	Eisstadion Davos

December, 1990	(Sweden) Färjestads BK	7–4	(Czechoslovakia) HC Dukla Jihlava	Eisstadion Davos

December, 1990	(Switzerland) EHC Kloten	1–7	Team Canada	Eisstadion Davos

=== Finals ===
December 31, 1990; 12:00	(Soviet Union) HC Spartak Moscow	8 – 3; 1–0, 4–0, 3–3	Team Canada	Eisstadion Davos
