= 1995 Spengler Cup =

1995 Spengler Cup Davos, Switzerland
Tournament details
- Host country: Switzerland
- Venue(s): Eisstadion Davos, Davos
- Dates: 26 – 31 December 1995
- Teams: 5

Final positions
- Champions: Team Canada (5th title)
- Runner-up: (Russia) Lada Togliatti

Tournament statistics
- Games played: 11
- Goals scored: 76 (6.91 per game)
- Scoring leader(s): Gilles Thibaudeau (6 pts)

The 1995 Spengler Cup was held in Davos, Switzerland, from December 26 to December 31, 1995. All matches were played at HC Davos's home arena, Eisstadion Davos. The final was won 3-0 by Team Canada over Lada Togliatti.

== Teams participating ==
- (Russia) Lada Togliatti
- Team Canada
- (Sweden) Färjestads BK
- (Finland) HIFK
- (Switzerland) HC Davos

== Tournament ==
=== Round-Robin results ===
Team	Pld	W	L	GF	GA	GD	Pts
(Russia) Lada Togliatti	4	3	1	17	10	+7	6
Team Canada	4	3	1	19	12	+7	6
(Sweden) Färjestads BK	4	2	2	14	10	+4	4
(Finland) HIFK	4	1	3	12	24	−12	2
(Switzerland) HC Davos	4	1	3	11	17	−6	2

December 26, 1995	(Switzerland) HC Davos	3–0	(Russia) Lada Togliatti	Eisstadion Davos

December 26, 1995	Team Canada	4–1	(Sweden) Färjestads BK	Eisstadion Davos

December 27, 1995	(Sweden) Färjestads BK	7–1	(Finland) HIFK	Eisstadion Davos

December 27, 1995	Team Canada	7–4	(Switzerland) HC Davos	Eisstadion Davos

December 28, 1995	(Finland) HIFK	3–5	Team Canada	Eisstadion Davos

December 28, 1995	(Sweden) Färjestads BK	2–4	(Russia) Lada Togliatti	Eisstadion Davos

December 29, 1995	(Russia) Lada Togliatti	4–3	Team Canada	Eisstadion Davos

December 29, 1995	(Switzerland) HC Davos	3–6	(Finland) HIFK	Eisstadion Davos

December 30, 1995	(Switzerland) HC Davos	1–4	(Sweden) Färjestads BK	Eisstadion Davos

December 30, 1995	(Finland) HIFK	2–9	(Russia) Lada Togliatti	Eisstadion Davos

=== Finals ===
December 31, 1995; 12:00	(Russia) Lada Togliatti	0 – 3 (0–2, 0–0, 0–1)	Team Canada	Eisstadion Davos
