= 2005 Spengler Cup =

2005 Spengler Cup Davos, Switzerland
Tournament details
- Host country: Switzerland
- Venue(s): Eisstadion Davos, Davos
- Dates: 26 – 31 December 2005
- Teams: 5

Final positions
- Champions: (Russia) Metallurg Magnitogorsk (1st title)
- Runner-up: Team Canada

Tournament statistics
- Games played: 11
- Goals scored: 82 (7.45 per game)
- Scoring leader(s): Mark Beaufait (7 pts); Steve Walker (7 pts)

The 2005 Spengler Cup was held in Davos, Switzerland, from December 26 to December 31, 2005. All matches were played at Davos' home arena Eisstadion Davos.

== Tournament Round-Robin results ==
Team	Pld	W	OTW	OTL	L	GF	GA	GD	Pts
Team Canada	4	3	0	1	0	19	7	+12	7
(Russia) Metallurg Magnitogorsk	4	1	2	0	1	11	11	0	6
(Germany) Eisbären Berlin	4	2	0	1	1	15	17	−2	5
(Switzerland) HC Davos	4	2	0	0	2	16	16	0	4
(Czech Republic) HC Sparta Praha	4	0	0	0	4	10	20	−10	0

== Results ==
December 26, 2005; 15:00	HC Sparta Praga	3–5 (0–2, 0–2, 3–1)	HC Davos

December 26, 2005; 20:15	Team Canada	1–2 GWS (0–0, 1–1, 0–0)	Metallurg

December 27, 2005; 15:00	Metallurg	4–3 GWS (2–2, 1–0, 0–1)	Eisbären Berlin

December 27, 2005; 20:15	HC Davos	2–4 (0–0, 0–3, 2–1)	Team Canada

December 28, 2005; 15:00	HC Davos	4–1 (1–0, 2–1, 1–0)	Metallurg

December 28, 2005; 20:15	Eisbären Berlin	3–2 (1–1, 0–1, 2–0)	HC Sparta Praga

December 29, 2005; 15:00	Team Canada	6–1 (2–1, 4–0, 0–0)	Eisbären Berlin

December 29, 2005; 20:15	Metallurg	4–3 (1–2, 3–0, 0–1)	HC Sparta Praga

December 30, 2005; 15:00	HC Sparta Praga	2–8 (0–5, 2–2, 0–1)	Team Canada

December 30, 2005; 20:15	Eisbären Berlin	8–5 (2–2, 3–3, 3–0)	HC Davos

== Final ==
December 31, 2005; 03:00 PM	(Russia) Metallurg Magnitogorsk	8–3	Team Canada	Eisstadion Davos
