= 1993 Spengler Cup =

1993 Spengler Cup Davos, Switzerland
Tournament details
- Host country: Switzerland
- Venue(s): Eisstadion Davos, Davos
- Dates: 26 – 31 December 1993
- Teams: 5

Final positions
- Champions: (Sweden) Färjestads BK (1st title)
- Runner-up: (Switzerland) HC Davos

Tournament statistics
- Games played: 11
- Goals scored: 90 (8.18 per game)
- Attendance: 76,020 (6,911 per game)
- Scoring leader(s): Andrei Khomutov (10 pts)

The 1993 Spengler Cup was held in Davos, Switzerland from December 26 to December 31, 1993. All matches were played at HC Davos's home arena, Eisstadion Davos. The final was won 6–3 by Färjestads BK over HC Davos.

== Teams participating ==
- (Switzerland) HC Davos
- (Sweden) Färjestads BK
- (Russia) Traktor Chelyabinsk
- Team Canada
- (Finland) Jokerit

== Tournament ==
=== Round-Robin results ===
Team	Pld	W	L	GF	GA	GD	Pts
(Switzerland) HC Davos	4	3	1	20	17	+3	6
(Sweden) Färjestads BK	4	3	1	18	13	+5	6
(Russia) Traktor Chelyabinsk	4	2	2	17	16	+1	4
Team Canada	4	1	3	12	18	−6	2
(Finland) Jokerit	4	1	3	14	17	−3	2

December 26, 1993	(Switzerland) HC Davos	8–7	(Russia) Traktor Chelyabinsk	Eisstadion Davos

December 26, 1993	(Sweden) Färjestads BK	6–4	Team Canada	Eisstadion Davos

December 27, 1993	Team Canada	5–4 SO	(Finland) Jokerit	Eisstadion Davos

December 27, 1993	(Switzerland) HC Davos	3–2	(Sweden) Färjestads BK	Eisstadion Davos

December 28, 1993	(Finland) Jokerit	3–4	(Sweden) Färjestads BK	Eisstadion Davos

December 28, 1993	(Russia) Traktor Chelyabinsk	3–1	Team Canada	Eisstadion Davos

December 29, 1993	(Switzerland) HC Davos	5–2	Team Canada	Eisstadion Davos

December 29, 1993	(Russia) Traktor Chelyabinsk	4–1	(Finland) Jokerit	Eisstadion Davos

December 30, 1993	(Sweden) Färjestads BK	6–3	(Russia) Traktor Chelyabinsk	Eisstadion Davos

December 30, 1993	(Switzerland) HC Davos	4–6	(Finland) Jokerit	Eisstadion Davos

=== Finals ===
December 31, 1993; 12:00	(Switzerland) HC Davos	3 – 6 (0–1, 2–2, 1–3)	(Sweden) Färjestads BK	Eisstadion Davos
