= 2003 Spengler Cup =

Invitational ice hockey tournament held in 2003 in Davos, Switzerland

2003 Spengler Cup Davos, Switzerland
Tournament details
- Host country: Switzerland
- Venue(s): Eisstadion Davos, Davos
- Dates: 26 – 31 December 2003
- Teams: 5

Final positions
- Champions: Team Canada (10th title)
- Runner-up: (Switzerland) HC Davos

Tournament statistics
- Games played: 11
- Goals scored: 81 (7.36 per game)
- Attendance: 82,173 (7,470 per game)
- Scoring leader(s): Éric Landry (10 pts)

Awards
- MVP: Oleg Petrov

The 2003 Spengler Cup was held in Davos, Switzerland from December 26 to December 31, 2003. All matches were played at host HC Davos's home Eisstadion Davos. The final was won 7-4 by Team Canada over host HC Davos.

== Teams participating ==
- Team Canada
- (Switzerland) HC Davos (host)
- (Germany) Krefeld Pinguine
- (Finland) Jokerit
- (Russia) Lokomotiv Yaroslavl

== Tournament ==
=== Round-Robin results ===
Team	Pld	W	OTW	OTL	L	GF	GA	GD	Pts
(Switzerland) HC Davos	4	3	0	0	1	21	12	+9	6
Team Canada	4	3	0	0	1	17	14	+3	6
(Russia) Lokomotiv Yaroslavl	4	2	0	0	2	13	14	−1	4
(Finland) Jokerit	4	1	0	0	3	8	13	−5	2
(Germany) Krefeld Pinguine	4	1	0	0	3	11	17	−6	2

All times local (CET/UTC +1)

December 26, 2003; 15:30	(Finland) Jokerit	1–4	(Switzerland) HC Davos	Eisstadion Davos

December 26, 2003; 20:45	Team Canada	3–2	(Germany) Krefeld Pinguine	Eisstadion Davos

December 27, 2003; 15:30	(Germany) Krefeld Pinguine	2–4	(Finland) Jokerit	Eisstadion Davos

December 27, 2003; 20:45	(Russia) Lokomotiv Yaroslavl	5–2	(Switzerland) HC Davos	Eisstadion Davos

December 28, 2003; 15:30	(Germany) Krefeld Pinguine	5–2	(Russia) Lokomotiv Yaroslavl	Eisstadion Davos

December 28, 2003; 20:45	(Finland) Jokerit	2–4	Team Canada	Eisstadion Davos

December 29, 2003; 15:30	Team Canada	6–3	(Russia) Lokomotiv Yaroslavl	Eisstadion Davos

December 29, 2003; 20:45	(Switzerland) HC Davos	8–2	(Germany) Krefeld Pinguine	Eisstadion Davos

December 30, 2003; 15:30	(Switzerland) HC Davos	7–4	Team Canada	Eisstadion Davos

December 30, 2003; 20:45	(Russia) Lokomotiv Yaroslavl	3–1	(Finland) Jokerit	Eisstadion Davos

=== Finals ===
December 31, 2003; 12:00	(Switzerland) HC Davos	4–7	Team Canada	Eisstadion Davos
