= 1998 Spengler Cup =

1998 Spengler Cup Davos, Switzerland
Tournament details
- Host country: Switzerland
- Venue(s): Eisstadion Davos, Davos
- Dates: 26 – 31 December 1998
- Teams: 5

Final positions
- Champions: Team Canada (8th title)
- Runner-up: (Switzerland) HC Davos

Tournament statistics
- Games played: 11
- Goals scored: 70 (6.36 per game)
- Attendance: 78,060 (7,096 per game)
- Scoring leader(s): Clas Eriksson (6 pts)

The 1998 Spengler Cup was held in Davos, Switzerland from December 26 to December 31, 1998. All matches were played at host HC Davos's home Eisstadion Davos. The final was won 5-2 by Team Canada over host HC Davos.

== Teams participating ==
- Team Canada
- (Switzerland) HC Davos (host)
- (Austria) VEU Feldkirch
- (Sweden) Färjestad BK
- (Czech Republic) HC Petra Vsetín

== Tournament ==
=== Round-Robin results ===
Team	Pld	W	L	GF	GA	GD	Pts
(Switzerland) HC Davos	4	3	1	17	8	+9	6
Team Canada	4	3	1	13	11	+2	6
(Sweden) Färjestad BK	4	2	2	13	11	+2	4
(Czech Republic) HC Petra Vsetín	4	1	3	13	18	−5	2
(Austria) VEU Feldkirch	4	1	3	7	14	−7	2

All times local (CET/UTC +1)

December 26, 1998; 15:30	(Switzerland) HC Davos	4–2	(Czech Republic) HC Petra Vsetín	Eisstadion Davos

December 26, 1998; 20:45	(Sweden) Färjestad BK	1–2	(Austria) VEU Feldkirch	Eisstadion Davos

December 27, 1998; 15:30	(Sweden) Färjestad BK	2–3	Team Canada	Eisstadion Davos

December 27, 1998; 20:45	(Czech Republic) HC Petra Vsetín	5–4	(Austria) VEU Feldkirch	Eisstadion Davos

December 28, 1998; 15:30	(Austria) VEU Feldkirch	1–4	(Switzerland) HC Davos	Eisstadion Davos

December 28, 1998; 20:45	Team Canada	5–4 SO	(Czech Republic) HC Petra Vsetín	Eisstadion Davos

December 29, 1998; 15:30	(Austria) VEU Feldkirch	4–4	Team Canada	Eisstadion Davos

December 29, 1998; 20:45	(Switzerland) HC Davos	4–5 OT	(Sweden) Färjestad BK	Eisstadion Davos

December 30, 1998; 15:30	(Czech Republic) HC Petra Vsetín	2–5	(Sweden) Färjestad BK	Eisstadion Davos

December 30, 1998; 20:45	Team Canada	1–5	(Switzerland) HC Davos	Eisstadion Davos

=== Finals ===
December 31, 1998; 12:00	(Switzerland) HC Davos	2–5	Team Canada	Eisstadion Davos
