= 2002 Spengler Cup =

2002 Spengler Cup Davos, Switzerland
Tournament details
- Host country: Switzerland
- Venue(s): Eisstadion Davos, Davos
- Dates: 26 – 31 December 2002
- Teams: 5

Final positions
- Champions: Team Canada (9th title)
- Runner-up: (Switzerland) HC Davos

Tournament statistics
- Games played: 11
- Goals scored: 65 (5.91 per game)
- Scoring leader(s): Mika Alatalo (7 pts)

The 2002 Spengler Cup was held in Davos, Switzerland from December 26 to December 31, 2002. All matches were played at host HC Davos's home Eisstadion Davos. The final was won 3-2 by Team Canada over host HC Davos.

== Teams participating ==
- Team Canada
- (Switzerland) HC Davos (host)
- (Germany) Kölner Haie
- (Finland) HC TPS
- (Czech Republic) HC Sparta Praha

== Tournament ==
=== Round-Robin results ===
Team	Pld	W	OTW	OTL	L	GF	GA	GD	Pts
Team Canada	4	4	0	0	0	16	10	+6	8
(Switzerland) HC Davos	4	2	1	0	1	15	10	+5	6
(Germany) Kölner Haie	4	2	0	0	2	12	11	+1	4
(Finland) HC TPS	4	1	0	1	2	13	16	−3	3
(Czech Republic) HC Sparta Praha	4	0	0	0	4	5	13	−8	0

All times local (CET/UTC +1)

December 26, 2002; 15:30	(Switzerland) HC Davos	2–0	(Czech Republic) HC Sparta Praha	Eisstadion Davos

December 26, 2002; 20:45	Team Canada	5–4	(Germany) Kölner Haie	Eisstadion Davos

December 27, 2002; 15:30	(Germany) Kölner Haie	3–1	(Czech Republic) HC Sparta Praha	Eisstadion Davos

December 27, 2002; 20:45	(Switzerland) HC Davos	6–5 SO	(Finland) HC TPS	Eisstadion Davos

December 28, 2002; 15:30	(Germany) Kölner Haie	3–0	(Finland) HC TPS	Eisstadion Davos

December 28, 2002; 20:45	(Czech Republic) HC Sparta Praha	1–4	Team Canada	Eisstadion Davos

December 29, 2002; 15:30	Team Canada	4–3	(Finland) HC TPS	Eisstadion Davos

December 29, 2002; 20:45	(Switzerland) HC Davos	5–2	(Germany) Kölner Haie	Eisstadion Davos

December 30, 2002; 15:30	(Switzerland) HC Davos	2–3	Team Canada	Eisstadion Davos

December 30, 2002; 20:45	(Finland) HC TPS	4–3	(Czech Republic) HC Sparta Praha	Eisstadion Davos

=== Finals ===
December 31, 2002; 12:00	Team Canada	3–2	(Switzerland) HC Davos	Eisstadion Davos
