= 1994 Spengler Cup =

1994 Spengler Cup Davos, Switzerland
Tournament details
- Host country: Switzerland
- Venue(s): Eisstadion Davos, Davos
- Dates: 26 – 31 December 1994
- Teams: 5

Final positions
- Champions: (Sweden) Färjestads BK (2nd title)
- Runner-up: (Switzerland) HC Davos

Tournament statistics
- Games played: 11
- Goals scored: 77 (7 per game)
- Scoring leader(s): Jonas Höglund (9 pts)

The 1994 Spengler Cup was held in Davos, Switzerland from December 26 to December 31, 1994. All matches were played at HC Davos's home arena, Eisstadion Davos. The final was won 3–0 by Färjestads BK over HC Davos.

== Teams participating ==
- (Sweden) Färjestads BK
- (Switzerland) HC Davos
- Team Canada
- (Russia) Traktor Chelyabinsk
- (Finland) HIFK

== Tournament ==
=== Round-Robin results ===
| Team | Pld | W | L | GF | GA | GD | Pts |
|---|---|---|---|---|---|---|---|
| (Sweden) Färjestads BK | 4 | 3 | 1 | 19 | 13 | +6 | 6 |
| (Switzerland) HC Davos | 4 | 3 | 1 | 21 | 12 | +9 | 6 |
| Team Canada | 4 | 2 | 2 | 10 | 15 | −5 | 4 |
| (Russia) Traktor Chelyabinsk | 4 | 1 | 3 | 8 | 11 | −3 | 2 |
| (Finland) HIFK | 4 | 1 | 3 | 16 | 23 | −7 | 2 |

| December 26, 1994 | (Switzerland) HC Davos | 3–8 | (Sweden) Färjestads BK | Eisstadion Davos |

| December 26, 1994 | Team Canada | 2–1 | (Russia) Traktor Chelyabinsk | Eisstadion Davos |

| December 27, 1994 | (Russia) Traktor Chelyabinsk | 1–4 | (Switzerland) HC Davos | Eisstadion Davos |

| December 27, 1994 | (Finland) HIFK | 5–6 | Team Canada | Eisstadion Davos |

| December 28, 1994 | (Sweden) Färjestads BK | 3–2 SO | (Russia) Traktor Chelyabinsk | Eisstadion Davos |

| December 28, 1994 | (Switzerland) HC Davos | 8–3 | (Finland) HIFK | Eisstadion Davos |

| December 29, 1994 | (Russia) Traktor Chelyabinsk | 4–2 | (Finland) HIFK | Eisstadion Davos |

| December 29, 1994 | (Sweden) Färjestads BK | 3–2 OT | Team Canada | Eisstadion Davos |

| December 30, 1994 | (Finland) HIFK | 6–5 OT | (Sweden) Färjestads BK | Eisstadion Davos |

| December 30, 1994 | Team Canada | 0–6 | (Switzerland) HC Davos | Eisstadion Davos |

=== Finals ===
| December 31, 1994; 12:00 | (Sweden) Färjestads BK | 3 – 0 (0–0, 0–0, 3–0) | (Switzerland) HC Davos | Eisstadion Davos |
