= 2000 Spengler Cup =

2000 Spengler Cup Davos, Switzerland
Tournament details
- Host country: Switzerland
- Venue(s): Eisstadion Davos, Davos
- Dates: 26 – 31 December 2000
- Teams: 5

Final positions
- Champions: (Switzerland) HC Davos (11th title)
- Runner-up: Team Canada

Tournament statistics
- Games played: 11
- Goals scored: 55 (5 per game)
- Attendance: 81,321 (7,393 per game)
- Scoring leader(s): Morgan Samuelsson (8 pts)

Awards
- MVP: Lonny Bohonos

The 2000 Spengler Cup was held in Davos, Switzerland from December 26 to December 31, 2000. All matches were played at HC Davos's home arena, Eisstadion Davos. The final was won 4-2 by HC Davos over Team Canada - Davos 11th title and first title since 1958

== Teams participating ==
- Team Canada
- (Switzerland) HC Davos
- (Germany) Kölner Haie
- (Czech Republic) HC Sparta Praha
- (Finland) Jokerit

== Tournament ==
=== Round-Robin results ===
Team	Pld	W	OTW	OTL	L	GF	GA	GD	Pts
Team Canada	4	2	1	1	0	13	9	+4	7
(Switzerland) HC Davos	4	2	1	1	0	11	6	+5	7
(Germany) Kölner Haie	4	1	1	1	1	11	10	+1	5
(Czech Republic) HC Sparta Praha	4	1	0	1	2	9	13	−4	3
(Finland) Jokerit	4	0	1	0	3	5	11	−6	2

All times local (CET/UTC +1)

December 26, 2000; 15:00	(Czech Republic) Sparta Praha	2–3 SO	(Switzerland) HC Davos	Eisstadion Davos

December 26, 2000; 20:15	(Finland) Jokerit	4–3 SO	(Germany) Kölner Haie	Eisstadion Davos

December 27, 2000; 15:00	(Finland) Jokerit	0–3	Team Canada	Eisstadion Davos

December 27, 2000; 20:15	(Germany) Kölner Haie	0–3	(Switzerland) HC Davos	Eisstadion Davos

December 28, 2000; 15:00	Team Canada	2–3 SO	(Germany) Kölner Haie	Eisstadion Davos

December 28, 2000; 20:15	(Czech Republic) Sparta Praha	2–0	(Finland) Jokerit	Eisstadion Davos

December 29, 2000; 15:00	(Germany) Kölner Haie	5–1	(Czech Republic) Sparta Praha	Eisstadion Davos

December 29, 2000; 20:15	(Switzerland) HC Davos	2–3 ОТ	Team Canada	Eisstadion Davos

December 30, 2000; 15:00	(Switzerland) HC Davos	3–1	(Finland) Jokerit	Eisstadion Davos

December 30, 2000; 20:15	Team Canada	5–4	(Czech Republic) HC Sparta Praha	Eisstadion Davos

=== Finals ===
December 31, 2000; 12:00	Team Canada	2 – 4 (2–1, 0–1, 0–2)	(Switzerland) HC Davos	Eisstadion Davos
