= Kirby Law =

Canadian ice hockey player

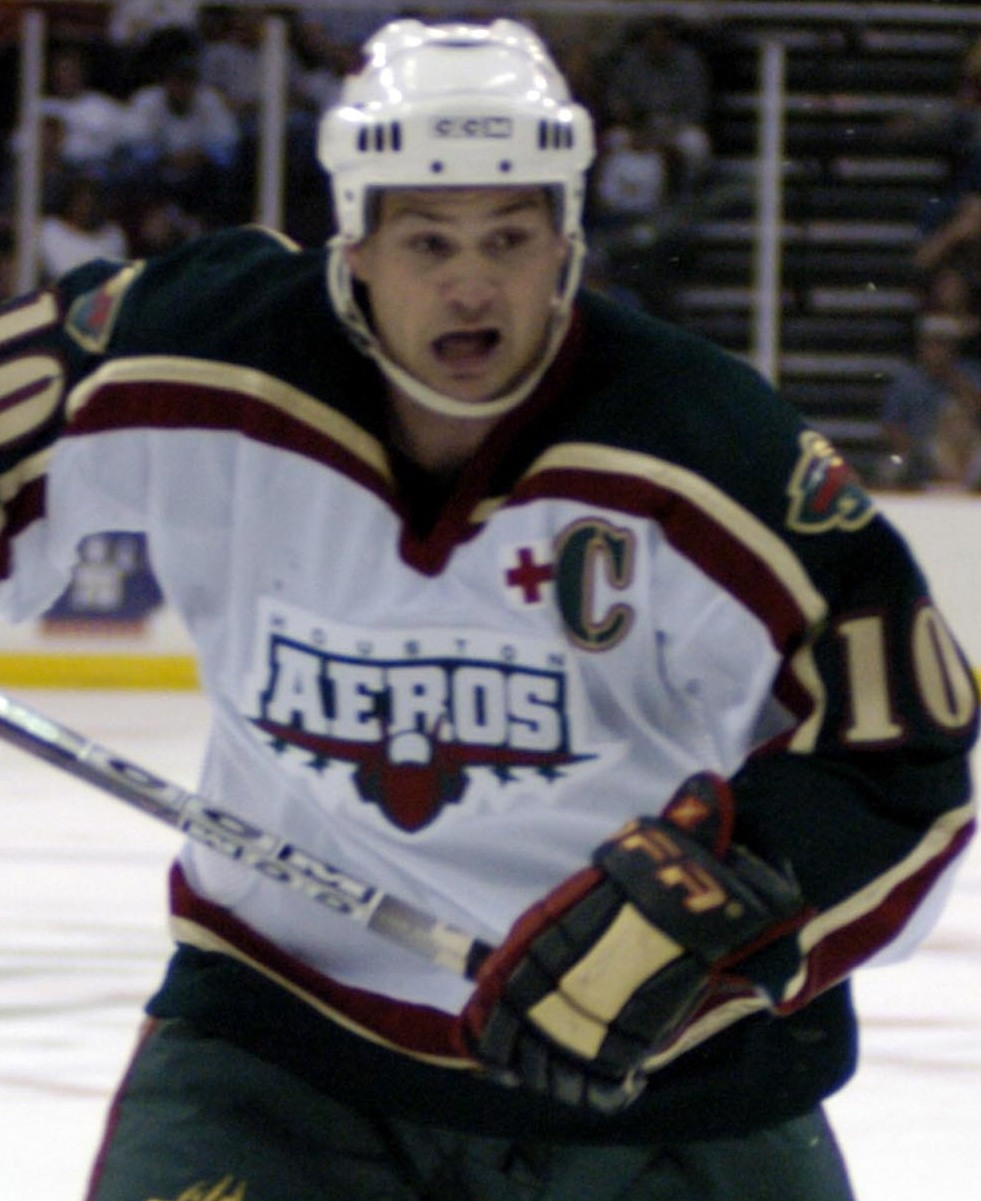
- Law with the Houston Aeros in 2005
- Born: March 11, 1977 (age 48); McCreary, Manitoba, Canada
- Height: 6 ft 1 in (185 cm)
- Weight: 185 lb (84 kg; 13 st 3 lb)
- Position: Right wing
- Shot: Right
- Played for: Philadelphia Flyers; Genève-Servette HC; HC Neftekhimik Nizhnekamsk; HC Fribourg-Gottéron; HC Ambri-Piotta
- NHL draft: Undrafted
- Playing career: 1998–2010

Kirby Law (born March 11, 1977) is a Canadian former professional ice hockey winger. He played nine games in the National Hockey League with the Philadelphia Flyers over three seasons from 2001 to 2004. The rest of his career, which lasted from 1998 to 2010, was spent in the minor leagues and then in Europe.

== Playing career ==
Born in McCreary, Manitoba, Law was not selected in any NHL draft. In the 2005-06 AHL season, his final in that league, Law led the league in scoring with 110 points for the Houston Aeros. Law left the AHL and in his fourth year abroad played in Swiss Hockey League with HC Ambri-Piotta. Law played for Team Canada at the 2007 Spengler Cup.

== Career statistics ==
=== Regular season and playoffs ===
			Regular season					Playoffs
Season	Team	League	GP	G	A	Pts	PIM	GP	G	A	Pts	PIM
1992–93	Dauphin Kings	MJHL	48	20	15	35	8	—	—	—	—	—
1993–94	Saskatoon Blades	WHL	66	9	11	20	39	16	0	0	0	6
1994–95	Saskatoon Blades	WHL	46	10	15	25	44	—	—	—	—	—
1994–95	Lethbridge Hurricanes	WHL	24	4	10	14	38	—	—	—	—	—
1995–96	Lethbridge Hurricanes	WHL	71	17	45	62	133	4	0	0	0	12
1996–97	Lethbridge Hurricanes	WHL	72	39	52	91	200	19	4	14	18	60
1996–97	Lethbridge Hurricanes	M-Cup	—	—	—	—	—	5	2	3	5	27
1997–98	Brandon Wheat Kings	WHL	49	34	44	78	153	9	3	3	6	41
1998–99	Orlando Solar Bears	IHL	67	18	13	31	136	—	—	—	—	—
1998–99	Adirondack Red Wings	AHL	11	2	3	5	40	3	1	0	1	2
1999–00	Orlando Solar Bears	IHL	1	1	0	1	0	—	—	—	—	—
1999–00	Louisville Panthers	AHL	66	31	21	52	173	—	—	—	—	—
1999–00	Philadelphia Phantoms	AHL	12	1	4	5	6	5	2	0	2	2
2000–01	Philadelphia Flyers	NHL	1	0	0	0	0	—	—	—	—	—
2000–01	Philadelphia Phantoms	AHL	78	27	34	61	150	10	1	6	7	16
2001–02	Philadelphia Phantoms	AHL	71	18	24	42	102	5	0	0	0	0
2002–03	Philadelphia Phantoms	AHL	74	22	19	41	166	—	—	—	—	—
2002–03	Philadelphia Flyers	NHL	2	0	0	0	2	—	—	—	—	—
2003–04	Philadelphia Phantoms	AHL	74	32	41	73	139	12	0	5	5	12
2003–04	Philadelphia Flyers	NHL	6	0	1	1	2	—	—	—	—	—
2004–05	Houston Aeros	AHL	80	25	24	49	134	5	0	1	1	4
2005–06	Houston Aeros	AHL	80	43	67	110	95	8	4	5	9	4
2006–07	Genève–Servette HC	NLA	44	17	33	50	40	5	1	3	4	0
2006–07	EHC Biel	NLB	—	—	—	—	—	6	8	6	14	0
2007–08	Genève–Servette HC	NLA	36	17	25	42	18	11	6	6	12	6
2008–09	Neftekhimik Nizhnekamsk	KHL	10	1	2	3	2	—	—	—	—	—
2008–09	HC Fribourg–Gottéron	NLA	28	4	21	25	8	7	2	2	4	0
2009–10	HC Ambrì–Piotta	NLA	48	16	23	39	24	—	—	—	—	—
2013–14	McCreary Mustangs	NCHL	18	8	14	22	32	4	3	2	5	14
2014–15	McCreary Mustangs	NCHL	20	11	17	28	28	2	3	6	9	0
AHL totals			546	201	237	438	1005	48	8	17	25	40
NHL totals			9	0	1	1	4	—	—	—	—	—

== Awards and honours ==
Award	Year
American Hockey League
First All-Star Team	2006
John B. Sollenberger Trophy	2006
