= 2006 Spengler Cup =

2006 Spengler Cup Davos, Switzerland
Tournament details
- Host country: Switzerland
- Venue: Eisstadion Davos
- Dates: 26–31 December 2006
- Teams: 5

Final positions
- Champions: (Switzerland) HC Davos (14th title)
- Runners-up: Team Canada

Tournament statistics
- Games played: 11

Official website
- Spengler Cup

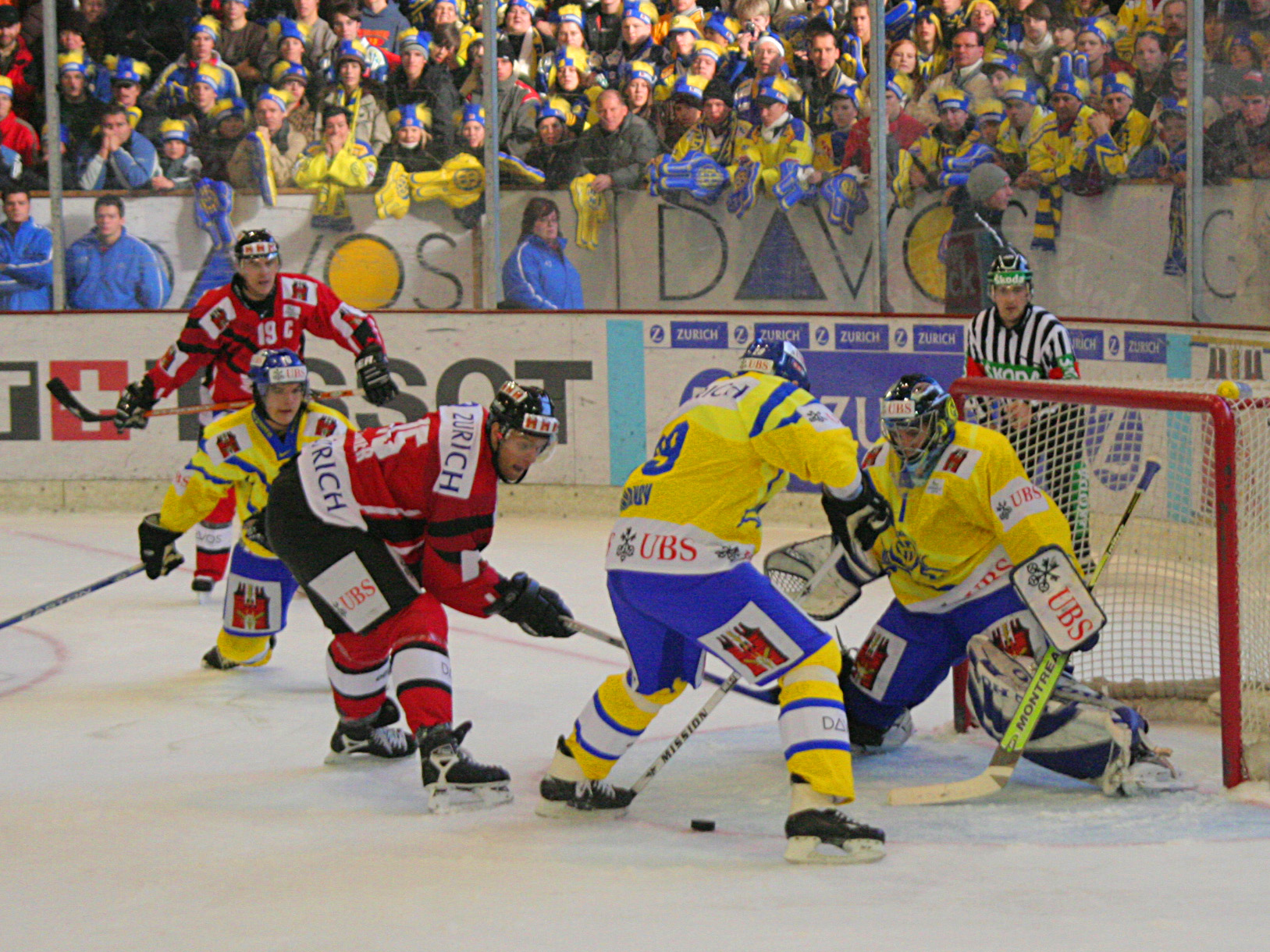
The Round-Robin match between HC Davos and Team Canada during the 2006 Spengler Cup.

The 2006 Spengler Cup was held in Davos, Switzerland from December 26 to December 31, 2006. All matches were played at HC Davos' home arena, Eisstadion Davos. Brent Payne, a member of Modo played for Team Canada and scored a total of 7 points, including 4 goals and 3 assists.

== Tournament Round-Robin results ==
Team	Pld	W	OTW	OTL	L	GF	GA	GD	Pts
Team Canada	4	2	1	0	1	15	13	+2	6
(Switzerland) HC Davos	4	2	0	1	1	13	11	+2	5
(Sweden) Mora IK	4	2	0	1	1	15	9	+6	5
(Russia) Khimik Moscow Oblast	4	1	1	0	2	9	11	−2	4
(Germany) Eisbären Berlin	4	1	0	0	3	8	16	−8	2

All times local (CET; UTC +1)

December 26, 2006; 03:00 PM	(Germany) Eisbären Berlin	1–4	(Switzerland) HC Davos	Eisstadion Davos

December 26, 2006; 08:15 PM	Team Canada	4–3 SO	(Sweden) Mora IK	Eisstadion Davos

December 27, 2006; 03:00 PM	(Sweden) Mora IK	5–0	(Russia) Khimik Moscow Oblast	Eisstadion Davos

December 27, 2006; 08:15 PM	Team Canada	6–3	(Switzerland) HC Davos	Eisstadion Davos

December 28, 2006; 03:00 PM	(Switzerland) HC Davos	4–1	(Sweden) Mora IK	Eisstadion Davos

December 28, 2006; 08:15 PM	(Germany) Eisbären Berlin	4–1	(Russia) Khimik Moscow Oblast	Eisstadion Davos

December 29, 2006; 03:00 PM	Team Canada	0–5	(Russia) Khimik Moscow Oblast	Eisstadion Davos

December 29, 2006; 08:15 PM	(Sweden) Mora IK	6–1	(Germany) Eisbären Berlin	Eisstadion Davos

December 30, 2006; 03:00 PM	Team Canada	5–2	(Germany) Eisbären Berlin	Eisstadion Davos

December 30, 2006; 08:15 PM	(Russia) Khimik Moscow Oblast	3–2 OT	(Switzerland) HC Davos	Eisstadion Davos

== Finals ==
December 31, 2006; 12:00 PM	Team Canada	2–3	(Switzerland) HC Davos	Eisstadion Davos

== Gallery ==
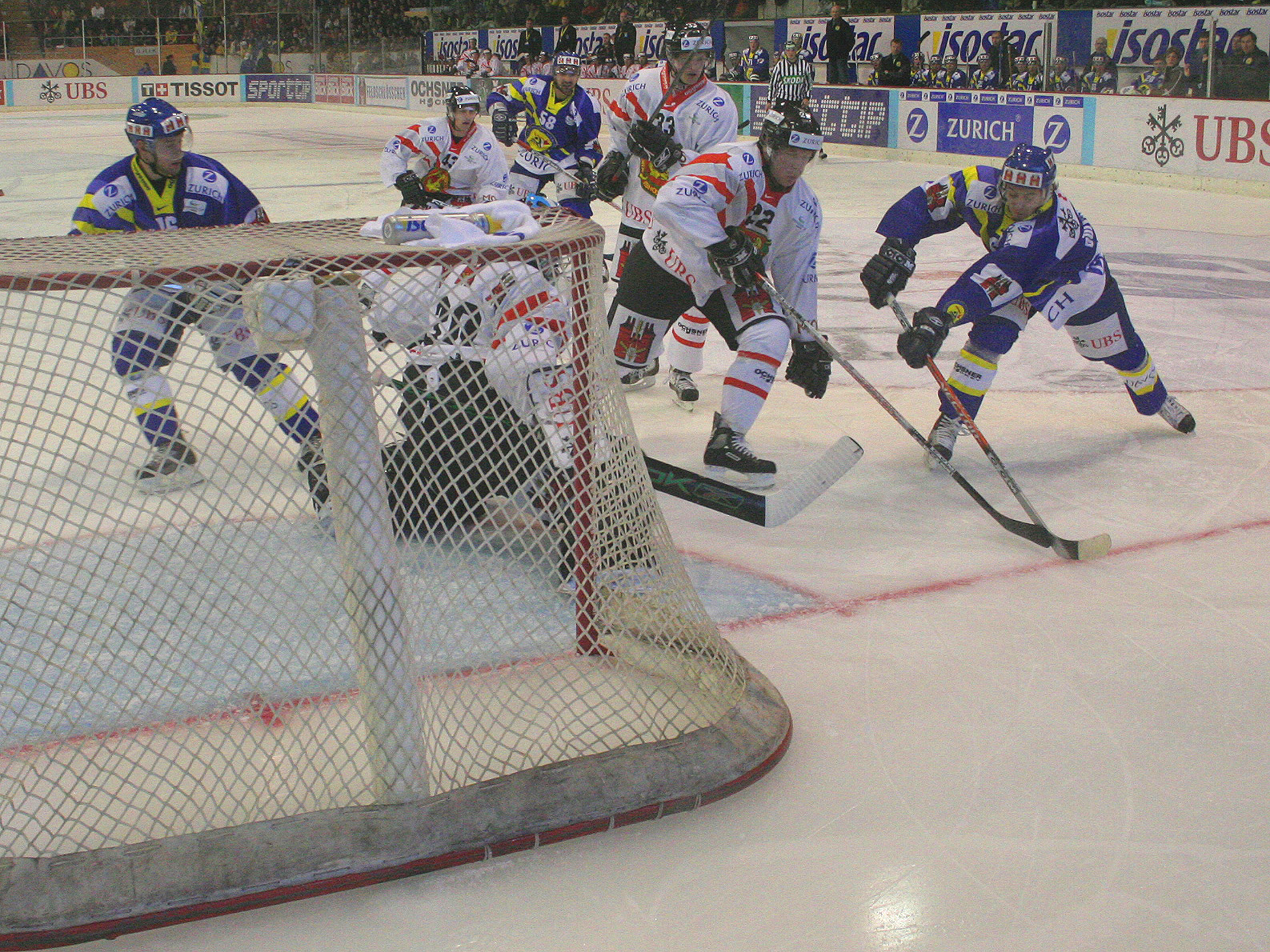
Round-Robin match between Mora IK and Khimik Moscow Oblast.

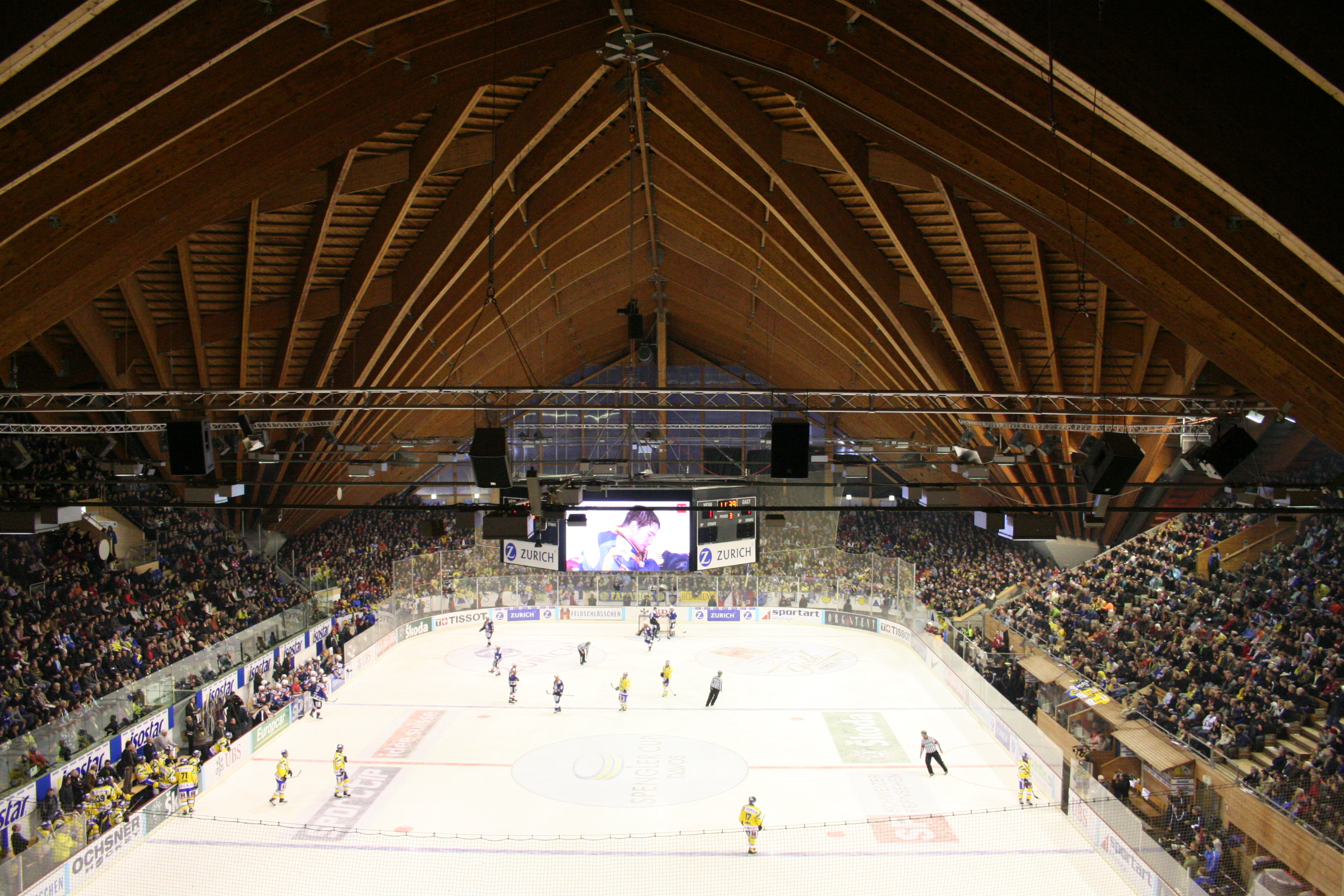
Eisstadion Davos (later renamed Vaillant Arena) during the 2006 Spengler Cup.

== See also ==
- Spengler Cup
