= 2001 Spengler Cup =

2001 Spengler Cup Davos, Switzerland
Tournament details
- Host country: Switzerland
- Venue(s): Eisstadion Davos, Davos
- Dates: 26 – 31 December 2001
- Teams: 5

Final positions
- Champions: (Switzerland) HC Davos (12th title)
- Runner-up: Team Canada

Tournament statistics
- Games played: 11
- Goals scored: 74 (6.73 per game)
- Attendance: 82,390 (7,490 per game)
- Scoring leader(s): Jaroslav Hlinka (5 pts)

The 2001 Spengler Cup was held in Davos, Switzerland from December 26 to December 31, 2001. All matches were played at HC Davos's home arena, Eisstadion Davos. The final was won 4-3 by HC Davos over Team Canada.

== Teams participating ==
- Team Canada
- (Switzerland) HC Davos
- (Finland) HC TPS
- (Germany) Adler Mannheim
- (Czech Republic) HC Sparta Praha

== Tournament ==
=== Round-Robin results ===
Team	Pld	W	OTW	OTL	L	GF	GA	GD	Pts
Team Canada	4	3	1	0	0	19	8	+11	8
(Switzerland) HC Davos	4	2	0	1	1	14	12	+2	5
(Finland) HC TPS	4	2	0	0	2	14	13	+1	4
(Germany) Adler Mannheim	4	1	0	0	3	9	20	−11	2
(Czech Republic) HC Sparta Praha	4	1	0	0	3	11	14	−3	2

All times local (CET/UTC +1)

December 26, 2001; 15:30	(Czech Republic) Sparta Praha	2–3	(Switzerland) HC Davos	Eisstadion Davos

December 26, 2001; 20:45	Team Canada	5–0	(Germany) Adler Mannheim	Eisstadion Davos

December 27, 2001; 15:30	Team Canada	4–2	(Finland) HC TPS	Eisstadion Davos

December 27, 2001; 20:45	(Germany) Adler Mannheim	2–5	(Switzerland) HC Davos	Eisstadion Davos

December 28, 2001; 15:30	(Finland) HC TPS	8–2	(Germany) Adler Mannheim	Eisstadion Davos

December 28, 2001; 20:45	(Czech Republic) Sparta Praha	1–4	Team Canada	Eisstadion Davos

December 29, 2001; 15:30	(Germany) Adler Mannheim	5–2	(Czech Republic) Sparta Praha	Eisstadion Davos

December 29, 2001; 20:45	(Switzerland) HC Davos	1–2	(Finland) HC TPS	Eisstadion Davos

December 30, 2001; 15:30	(Switzerland) HC Davos	5–6 OT	Team Canada	Eisstadion Davos

December 30, 2001; 20:45	(Finland) HC TPS	2–6	(Czech Republic) Sparta Praha	Eisstadion Davos

=== Finals ===
December 31, 2001; 12:00	Team Canada	3 – 4 OT (0–0, 2–3, 1–0, 0-1)	(Switzerland) HC Davos	Eisstadion Davos
