= NTv2 =

The NTv2 (National Transformation version 2) is a standard binary grid shift (.GSB) file format. It can transform coordinates between the NAD27 and NAD83 geodetic reference systems for example. The transformation is bidimensional (2D), or horizontal, and does not require heights.

== Development and adaptation ==
The National Transformation format has been developed by Natural Resources Canada's Geodetic Survey Division for conversions between NAD27 and NAD83 but it has been adapted to several other countries, such as Australia, Austria, Belgium, Brazil, Canada, France, Germany, New Zealand, Portugal, Romania, South Africa, Spain, Switzerland, Venezuela and the United Kingdom.
