= 1996 Spengler Cup =

1996 Spengler Cup Davos, Switzerland
Tournament details
- Host country: Switzerland
- Venue(s): Eisstadion Davos, Davos
- Dates: 26 – 31 December 1996
- Teams: 5

Final positions
- Champions: Team Canada (6th title)
- Runner-up: (Switzerland) HC Davos

Tournament statistics
- Games played: 11
- Goals scored: 87 (7.91 per game)
- Scoring leader(s): Sylvain Turgeon (7 pts)

The 1996 Spengler Cup was held in Davos, Switzerland from December 26 to December 31, 1996. All matches were played at HC Davos's home arena, Eisstadion Davos. The final was won 6-2 by Team Canada over HC Davos.

== Teams participating ==
- Team Canada
- (Switzerland) HC Davos
- (United States) Rochester Americans
- (Finland) Jokerit
- (Sweden) Leksands IF

== Tournament ==
=== Round-Robin results ===
Team	Pld	W	L	GF	GA	GD	Pts
Team Canada	4	3	1	17	15	+2	6
(Switzerland) HC Davos	4	3	1	24	14	+10	6
(United States) Rochester Americans	4	2	2	13	19	−6	4
(Finland) Jokerit	4	2	2	14	14	0	4
(Sweden) Leksands IF	4	0	4	11	17	−6	0

December 26, 1996	(Switzerland) HC Davos	9–2	(United States) Rochester Americans	Eisstadion Davos

December 26, 1996	Team Canada	4–2	(Sweden) Leksands IF	Eisstadion Davos

December 27, 1996	(Finland) Jokerit	6–3	Team Canada	Eisstadion Davos

December 27, 1996	(Switzerland) HC Davos	5–4	(Sweden) Leksands IF	Eisstadion Davos

December 28, 1996	(United States) Rochester Americans	3–5	Team Canada	Eisstadion Davos

December 28, 1996	(Finland) Jokerit	3–2	(Sweden) Leksands IF	Eisstadion Davos

December 29, 1996	(Sweden) Leksands IF	3–5	(United States) Rochester Americans	Eisstadion Davos

December 29, 1996	(Switzerland) HC Davos	6–3	(Finland) Jokerit	Eisstadion Davos

December 30, 1996	(Finland) Jokerit	2–3 SO	(United States) Rochester Americans	Eisstadion Davos

December 30, 1996	(Switzerland) HC Davos	4–5	Team Canada	Eisstadion Davos

=== Finals ===
December 31, 1996; 12:00	Team Canada	6 – 2 (1–1, 2–1, 3–0)	(Switzerland) HC Davos	Eisstadion Davos
