= Spengler Cup =

Ice hockey tournament in Davos, Switzerland

Coordinates: 46°47′54.4″N 9°49′35″E

- Most recent season or competition: 2025 Spengler Cup
- Spengler Cup logo
- Sport: Ice hockey
- Founded: 1923
- Founder: Dr. Carl Spengler
- First season: 1923
- Organizing body: HC Davos
- Motto: The Peak of Hockey
- No. of teams: 6
- Countries: Switzerland, Canada, various other European countries
- Venues: Eisstadion Davos (Davos, Switzerland)
- Most recent champion: (Switzerland) HC Davos (17th title)
- Most titles: (Switzerland) HC Davos (17 titles)
- Qualification: Invitation only
- Broadcasters: SUI: Schweizer Radio und Fernsehen; Europe: Eurosport 2 RUS: Match! Game & NTv2; GER: Sport1; CAN: TSN & RDS; USA: ESPN+ CZE / SVK / HUN: Sport1; DEN: TV2; SLO: Šport TV; SRB / CRO / BIH / MNE / MKD: Arena Sport; GBR: Viaplay
- Website: www.spenglercup.ch/en

The Spengler Cup is an annual invitational ice hockey tournament held in Davos, Switzerland. First held in 1923, the Spengler Cup is often cited as the oldest invitational ice hockey tournament in the world. The event is hosted by the Swiss team HC Davos and played each year in Davos between 26 and 31 December. Currently, all games are held at the Eisstadion Davos.

It was originally devised by Dr. Carl Spengler as a means to promote teams from German-speaking Europe, who might have suffered ostracism in the aftermath of World War I. Eventually, the tournament grew well beyond expectations. Many of Europe's most prestigious clubs and national programs have appeared, including Soviet, Czechoslovak, Swedish, German, and Finnish powerhouses. Through its history, club or national teams from 13 countries have won the tournament, with HC Davos winning the most cups as a club (17), while various teams from Switzerland have won the most cups for one country (23).

Among non-European organizations, Team Canada, Team USA, nationally ranked U.S. collegiate teams, the reigning American Hockey League's Calder Cup champion and the Ontario Hockey Association's champion, and even Team Japan (in 1971, building international experience before playing as hosts of the 1972 Sapporo Winter Olympics) have competed for the Spengler Cup. Since at least 1990, Team Canada has been the only participant from North America, with the exception of the AHL's Rochester Americans in 1996 and 2013. Future participation of the AHL has been discussed by tournament organisers and the league.

In the 2018 tournament, Finland's KalPa defeated Team Canada 2–1 in the final. The game was decided in the eighth round of a shootout, the first series of game-winning shots in tournament history that determined the winner of the Spengler Cup.

The Spengler Cup tournament was not played in 2020 or 2021 due to the COVID-19 pandemic. In the 2025 tournament, hosts HC Davos defeated the U.S. Collegiate Selects 6–3 in the final; Davos thus winning the most championships as a club with 17.

== History ==
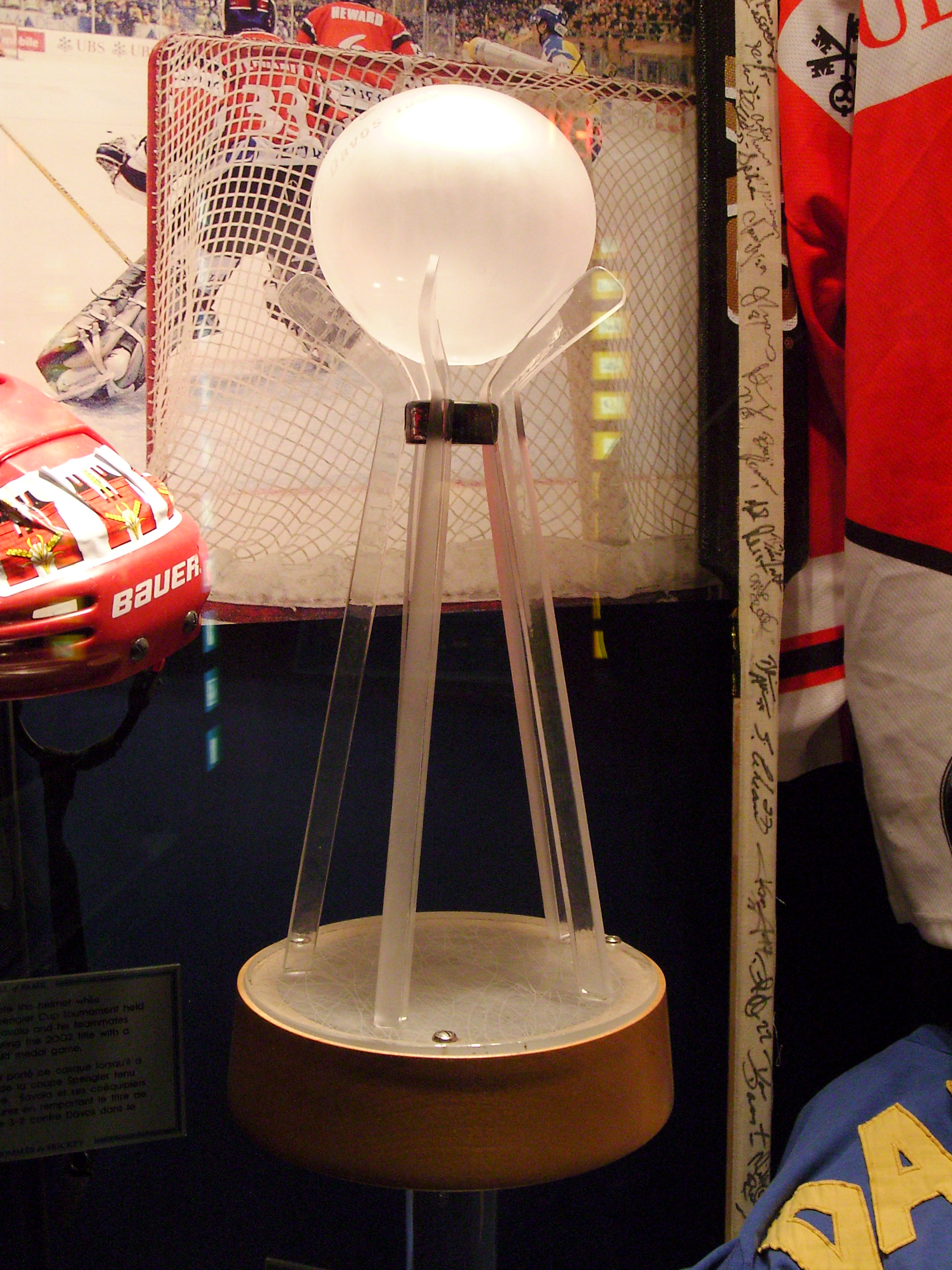
A former Spengler Cup trophy on display at the Hockey Hall of Fame, Toronto, Ontario, Canada.

Many participating teams are club teams, rather than national teams, where a club team might have players from many nations on the roster. The first tournament was won in 1923 by the Oxford University Ice Hockey Club, composed of Canadians studying at the University of Oxford.

The first 24 tournaments were dominated by host HC Davos (7 wins, 12 runners-up) and the Czechoslovak club team LTC Prague (7 wins, 2 runners-up). The LTC Prague team was shut down by the Czechoslovak communist authorities after players defected at the 1948 Spengler Cup tournament. Between 1965 and 1983, the tournament was dominated by various Czechoslovak and Soviet teams. Since joining the tournament in 1984, Team Canada has been the dominant participant, with 16 wins and 10 runners-up. Team Canada is made up of Canadians predominantly playing in Europe, as the tournament occurs during the NHL and AHL seasons, though active NHL stars Joe Thornton and Rick Nash played for HC Davos during the 2004–05 NHL lockout.

From its inception until 1978, the tournament was played on an outdoor rink. The outdoor rink still exists outside the indoor arena, and is one of the largest outdoor rinks in the world. Starting in 1978, all tournament games have been played indoors.

The Spengler Cup was cancelled in 2020 due to the COVID-19 pandemic. While the tournament was scheduled to return in 2021, Team Canada withdrew from the competition due to problems scheduling a quarantine isolation period before the start of play, and HC Ambrì-Piotta withdrew from the competition due to COVID-19 cases among the club's players. The 2021 event was ultimately cancelled on 25 December due to COVID cases within HC Davos.

=== Sponsorship ===
The Spengler Cup is the second-largest sporting event in Switzerland, after tennis' Swiss Indoors in Basel. The tournament had a budget of CHF 11 million in 2016. About 40% of the total tournament budget amount comes from corporate sponsors. Since 1985, UBS has been the main sponsor and presenting partner of the Spengler Cup. Other current major sponsors are Würth, Schenker Storen, Škoda, Calanda, and Hostpoint.ch – each of whom, along with UBS, are the main tournament sponsor of one of the six teams each year.

== International broadcasts ==
Bringing international hockey to North American television in the early 2000s, Paul Graham produced coverage of the Spengler Cup during his career in television production.

The Spengler Cup is currently broadcast on Schweizer Radio und Fernsehen in Switzerland, on Eurosport 2 in most of Europe, on Match! Game and NTv2 in Russia, on Sport1 in the Czech Republic, Slovakia and Hungary, on Šport TV in Slovenia, on TSN and RDS in Canada and on the streaming service Viaplay in the United Kingdom.

== Spengler Cup winners ==
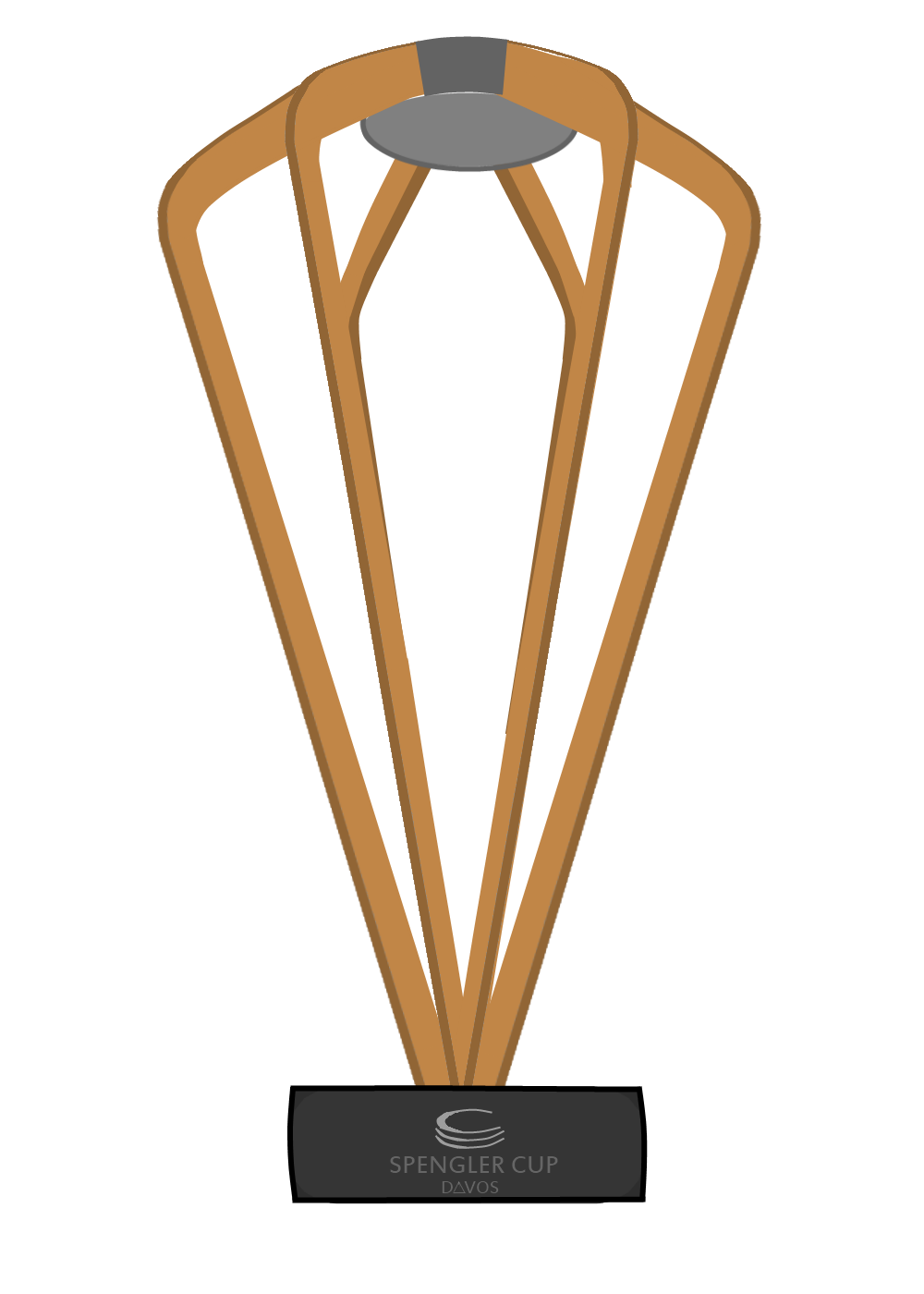
A representation of the current Spengler Cup trophy.

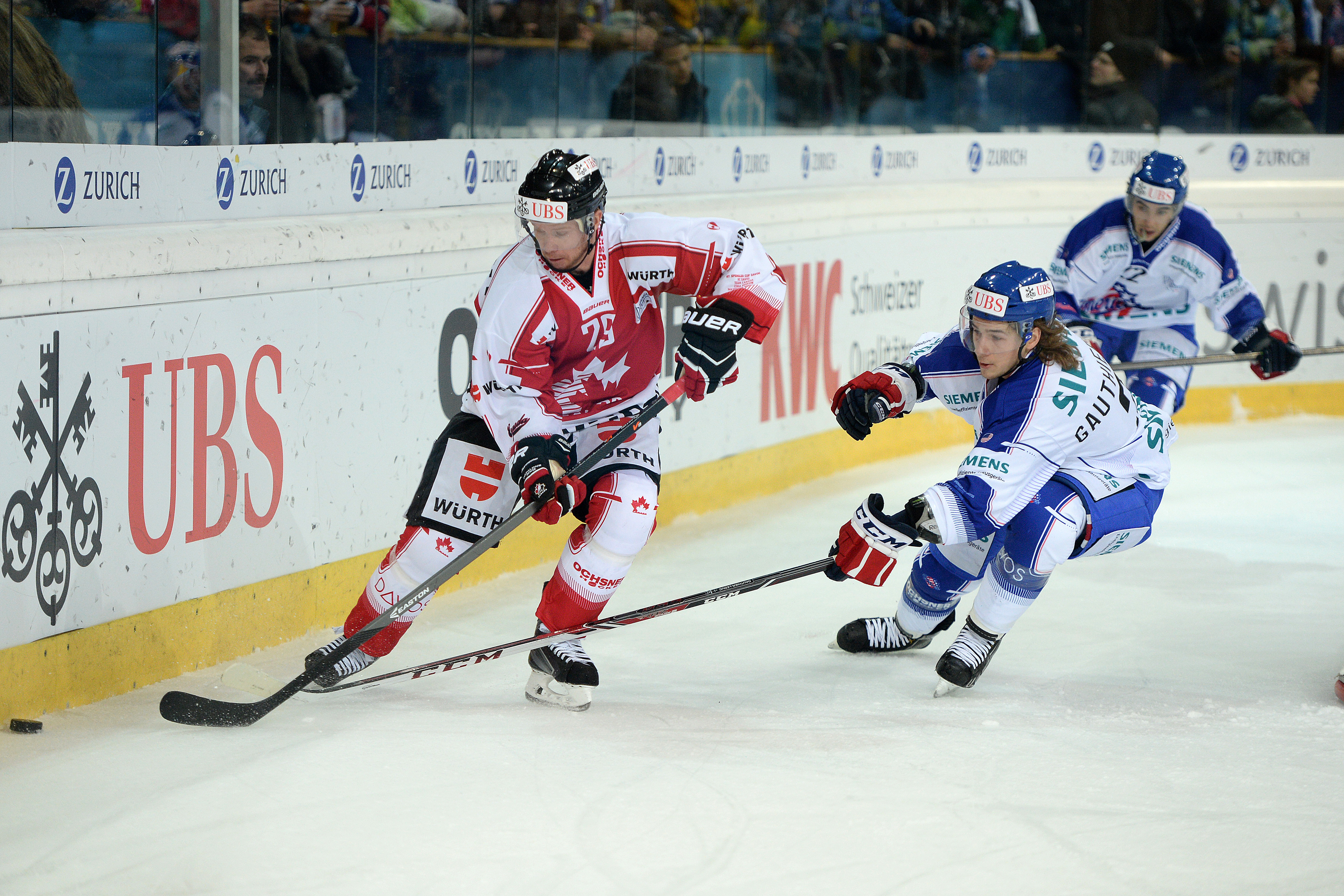
Team Canada against the Rochester Americans in the 2013 tournament.

Year	Winner	Runner-up
1923	(United Kingdom) Oxford University	(Weimar Republic) Berlin SC
1924	(Weimar Republic) Berlin SC	(Switzerland) HC Davos
1925	(United Kingdom) Oxford University	(Switzerland) HC Davos
1926	(Weimar Republic) Berlin SC	(Switzerland) HC Davos
1927	(Switzerland) HC Davos	(Weimar Republic) Berlin SC
1928	(Weimar Republic) Berlin SC	(United Kingdom) Cambridge University
1929	(Czechoslovakia) LTC Prague	(Switzerland) HC Davos
1930	(Czechoslovakia) LTC Prague	(Switzerland) HC Davos
1931	(United Kingdom) Oxford University	(Weimar Republic) Berlin SC
1932	(Czechoslovakia) LTC Prague (United Kingdom) Oxford University^{1}	(Switzerland) HC Davos (3rd place)
1933	(Switzerland) HC Davos	(French Third Republic) Paris Rapides
1934	(Italy) Diavoli Rossoneri Milano	(United Kingdom) Oxford University
1935	(Italy) Diavoli Rossoneri Milano	(Switzerland) HC Davos
1936	(Switzerland) HC Davos	(Czechoslovakia) LTC Prague
1937	(Czechoslovakia) LTC Prague	(Switzerland) HC Davos
1938	(Switzerland) HC Davos	(Czechoslovakia) LTC Prague
1939	Tournament not held due to World War II	
1940	Tournament not held due to World War II	
1941	(Switzerland) HC Davos	(Nazi Germany) Berlin SC
1942	(Switzerland) HC Davos	(Switzerland) Zürcher SC
1943	(Switzerland) HC Davos	(Switzerland) Zürcher SC
1944	(Switzerland) Zürcher SC	(Switzerland) HC Davos
1945	(Switzerland) Zürcher SC	(Switzerland) HC Davos
1946	(Czechoslovakia) LTC Prague	(Switzerland) HC Davos
1947	(Czechoslovakia) LTC Prague	(Switzerland) HC Davos
1948	(Czechoslovakia) LTC Prague	(Switzerland) HC Davos
1949	Tournament not held due to high Cold War tensions	
1950	(Italy) Diavoli Rossoneri Milano	(Sweden) AIK Stockholm
1951	(Switzerland) HC Davos	(West Germany) Preussen Krefeld
1952	(West Germany) EV Füssen	(Switzerland) Zürcher SC
1953	(Italy) HC Milano Inter	(Switzerland) HC Davos
1954	(Italy) HC Milano Inter	(West Germany) EV Füssen
1955	(Czechoslovakia) Rudá Hvězda Brno	(Switzerland) HC Davos
1956	Tournament not held for financial reasons	
1957	(Switzerland) HC Davos	(Czechoslovakia) Rudá Hvězda Brno
1958	(Switzerland) HC Davos	(Italy) Diavoli Rossoneri Milano
1959	(France) ACBB Paris	(West Germany) EV Füssen
1960	(France) ACBB Paris	(Switzerland) HC Davos
1961	(France) ACBB Paris	(West Germany) EV Füssen
1962	(Czechoslovakia) Sparta Prague	(West Germany) EV Füssen
1963	(Czechoslovakia) Sparta Prague	(Austria) Klagenfurt AC
1964	(West Germany) EV Füssen	(Sweden) Modo Hockey
1965	(Czechoslovakia) Dukla Jihlava	(Sweden) VIK Västerås HK
1966	(Czechoslovakia) Dukla Jihlava	(Belgium) CP Liège
1967	(Soviet Union) Lokomotiv Moscow	(Canada) Kingston Aces
1968	(Czechoslovakia) Dukla Jihlava	(Sweden) Rögle BK
1969	(Soviet Union) Lokomotiv Moscow	(Switzerland) HC Davos
1970	(Soviet Union) SKA Leningrad	(Czechoslovakia) Dukla Jihlava
1971	(Soviet Union) SKA Leningrad	(Czechoslovakia) Dukla Jihlava
1972	(Czechoslovakia) HC Slovan Bratislava	(Soviet Union) Torpedo Gorkiy
1973	(Czechoslovakia) HC Slovan Bratislava	(Soviet Union) Traktor Chelyabinsk
1974	(Czechoslovakia) HC Slovan Bratislava	(Polish People's Republic) Team Poland
1975	(Czechoslovakia) Czechoslovak Olympic Team	Team Finland
1976	(Soviet Union) USSR B	Czechoslovakia B
1977	(Soviet Union) SKA Leningrad	(Czechoslovakia) Dukla Jihlava
1978	(Czechoslovakia) Dukla Jihlava	(Sweden) AIK Stockholm
1979	(Soviet Union) Krylya Sovetov Moscow	(West Germany) Düsseldorfer EG
1980	(Soviet Union) Spartak Moscow	(Czechoslovakia) TJ Vítkovice
1981	(Soviet Union) Spartak Moscow	(Switzerland) HC Davos
1982	(Czechoslovakia) Dukla Jihlava	(Soviet Union) Spartak Moscow
1983	(Soviet Union) Dynamo Moscow	(Czechoslovakia) Dukla Jihlava
1984	Team Canada	(Czechoslovakia) Dukla Jihlava
1985	(Soviet Union) Spartak Moscow	Team Canada
1986	Team Canada	(Soviet Union) Sokil Kiev
1987	Team Canada	(Soviet Union) Krylya Sovetov Moscow
1988	(United States) USA Selects	Team Canada
1989	(Soviet Union) Spartak Moscow	(Sweden) Färjestad BK
1990	(Soviet Union) Spartak Moscow	Team Canada
1991	(Soviet Union) / (Russia) CSKA Moscow	(Switzerland) HC Lugano
1992	Team Canada	(Sweden) Färjestad BK
1993	(Sweden) Färjestad BK	(Switzerland) HC Davos
1994	(Sweden) Färjestad BK	(Switzerland) HC Davos
1995	Team Canada	(Russia) Lada Togliatti
1996	Team Canada	(Switzerland) HC Davos
1997	Team Canada	(Sweden) Färjestad BK
1998	Team Canada	(Switzerland) HC Davos
1999	(Germany) Kölner Haie	(Russia) Metallurg Magnitogorsk
2000	(Switzerland) HC Davos	Team Canada
2001	(Switzerland) HC Davos	Team Canada
2002	Team Canada	(Switzerland) HC Davos
2003	Team Canada	(Switzerland) HC Davos
2004	(Switzerland) HC Davos	(Czech Republic) Sparta Prague
2005	(Russia) Metallurg Magnitogorsk	Team Canada
2006	(Switzerland) HC Davos	Team Canada
2007	Team Canada	(Russia) Salavat Yulaev Ufa
2008	(Russia) Dynamo Moscow	Team Canada
2009	(Belarus) Dinamo Minsk	(Switzerland) HC Davos
2010	(Russia) SKA Saint Petersburg	Team Canada
2011	(Switzerland) HC Davos	(Latvia) Dinamo Riga
2012	Team Canada	(Switzerland) HC Davos
2013	(Switzerland) Genève-Servette HC	(Russia) CSKA Moscow
2014	(Switzerland) Genève-Servette HC	(Russia) Salavat Yulaev Ufa
2015	Team Canada	(Switzerland) HC Lugano
2016	Team Canada	(Switzerland) HC Lugano
2017	Team Canada	Team Switzerland
2018	(Finland) KalPa Kuopio	Team Canada
2019	Team Canada	(Czech Republic) HC Oceláři Třinec
2020	Tournament not held due to the COVID-19 pandemic	
2021	Tournament not held due to the COVID-19 pandemic	
2022	(Switzerland) HC Ambrì-Piotta	(Czech Republic) Sparta Prague
2023	(Switzerland) HC Davos	(Czech Republic) Dynamo Pardubice
2024	(Switzerland) HC Fribourg-Gottéron	(Germany) Straubing Tigers
2025	(Switzerland) HC Davos	(United States) U.S. Collegiate Selects

Notes

^{1} Oxford University and LTC Prague play to a 0–0 score after overtime. Both teams are declared winners.

== Performances ==
=== By club ===
Performance in the Spengler Cup by club
Club	Won	Runner-up	Years won	Years runner-up
(Switzerland) HC Davos	17	25	1927, 1933, 1936, 1938, 1941, 1942, 1943, 1951, 1957, 1958, 2000, 2001, 2004, 2006, 2011, 2023, 2025	1924, 1925, 1926, 1929, 1930, 1935, 1937, 1944, 1945, 1946, 1947, 1948, 1953, 1955, 1960, 1969, 1981, 1993, 1994, 1996, 1998, 2002, 2003, 2009, 2012
Team Canada	16	10	1984, 1986, 1987, 1992, 1995, 1996, 1997, 1998, 2002, 2003, 2007, 2012, 2015, 2016, 2017, 2019	1985, 1988, 1990, 2000, 2001, 2005, 2006, 2008, 2010, 2018
(Czech Republic) LTC Prague	7	2	1929, 1930, 1932, 1937, 1946, 1947, 1948	1936, 1938
(Czech Republic) Dukla Jihlava	5	5	1965, 1966, 1968, 1978, 1982	1970, 1971, 1977, 1983, 1984
(Russia) Spartak Moscow	5	1	1980, 1981, 1985, 1989, 1990	1982
(United Kingdom) Oxford University	4	1	1923, 1925, 1931, 1932	1934
(Russia) SKA Leningrad / SKA Saint Petersburg	4	0	1970, 1971, 1977, 2010	–
(Germany) Berlin SC	3	4	1924, 1926, 1928	1923, 1927, 1931, 1941
(Italy) Diavoli Rossoneri Milano	3	1	1934, 1935, 1950	1958
(France) ACBB Paris	3	0	1959, 1960, 1961	–
(Slovakia) HC Slovan Bratislava^{1}	3	0	1972, 1973, 1974	–
(Germany) EV Füssen	2	4	1952, 1964	1954, 1959, 1961, 1962
(Switzerland) Zürcher SC	2	3	1944, 1945	1942, 1943, 1952
(Sweden) Färjestad BK	2	3	1993, 1994	1989, 1992, 1997
(Czech Republic) Sparta Prague	2	2	1962, 1963	2004, 2022
(Italy) HC Milano Inter	2	0	1953, 1954	–
(Russia) Lokomotiv Moscow	2	0	1967, 1969	–
(Russia) Dynamo Moscow	2	0	1983, 2008	–
(Switzerland) Genève-Servette HC	2	0	2013, 2014	–
(Czech Republic) Rudá Hvězda Brno	1	1	1955	1957
(Russia) Krylya Sovetov Moscow	1	1	1979	1987
(Russia) CSKA Moscow	1	1	1991	2013
(Russia) Metallurg Magnitogorsk	1	1	2005	1999
(Czechoslovakia) Czechoslovak Olympic Team	1	0	1975	–
(Soviet Union) USSR B	1	0	1976	–
(United States) USA Selects	1	0	1988	–
(Germany) Kölner Haie	1	0	1999	–
(Belarus) Dinamo Minsk	1	0	2009	–
(Finland) KalPa Kuopio	1	0	2018	–
(Switzerland) HC Ambrì-Piotta	1	0	2022	–
(Switzerland) HC Fribourg-Gottéron	1	0	2024	–
(Switzerland) HC Lugano	0	3	–	1991, 2015, 2016
(Sweden) AIK Stockholm	0	2	–	1950, 1978
(Russia) Salavat Yulaev Ufa	0	2	–	2007, 2014
(United Kingdom) Cambridge University	0	1	–	1928
(France) Paris Rapides	0	1	–	1933
(Germany) Preussen Krefeld	0	1	–	1951
(Austria) Klagenfurt AC	0	1	–	1963
(Sweden) Modo Hockey	0	1	–	1964
(Sweden) VIK Västerås HK	0	1	–	1965
(Belgium) CP Liège	0	1	–	1966
(Canada) Kingston Aces	0	1	–	1967
(Sweden) Rögle BK	0	1	–	1968
(Russia) Torpedo Gorkiy	0	1	–	1972
(Russia) Traktor Chelyabinsk	0	1	–	1973
(Polish People's Republic) Team Poland	0	1	–	1974
Team Finland	0	1	–	1975
Czechoslovakia B	0	1	–	1976
(Germany) Düsseldorfer EG	0	1	–	1979
(Czech Republic) TJ Vítkovice	0	1	–	1980
(Ukraine) Sokil Kiev^{2}	0	1	–	1986
(Russia) Lada Togliatti	0	1	–	1995
(Latvia) Dinamo Riga	0	1	–	2011
Team Switzerland	0	1	–	2017
(Czech Republic) HC Oceláři Třinec	0	1	–	2019
(Czech Republic) Dynamo Pardubice	0	1	–	2023
(Germany) Straubing Tigers	0	1	–	2024
(United States) U.S. Collegiate Selects	0	1	–	2025

Notes

^{1} Slovakia was a part of Czechoslovakia until 1993, so HC Slovan Bratislava in the 1970s represented both communist Czechoslovakia and the Slovak Socialist Republic.
^{2} Ukraine was a Soviet republic at the time, so Sokil Kiev represented both the Soviet Union and Soviet Ukraine.

=== By nation ===
Performance by nation
Nation	Winners	Runners-up
Switzerland	23	32
Czechoslovakia^{1}	19	10
Canada^{2}	16	11
Soviet Union^{3}	13	5
Germany^{4}	6	11
Italy^{5}	5	1
Russia^{6}	4	5
United Kingdom	4	2
France^{7}	3	1
Sweden	2	8
Finland	1	1
United States	1	1
Belarus	1	0
Czech Republic	0	4
Austria	0	1
Belgium	0	1
Latvia	0	1
Poland	0	1

Notes

^{1} Includes hockey clubs from the First Czechoslovak Republic, the Third Czechoslovak Republic, the Czechoslovak Socialist Republic, and the last Czech and Slovak Federative Republic based in today's Czechia and Slovakia, and Czechoslovak national teams.
^{2} Includes the runner-up 1967 Kingston Aces of the Ontario Hockey Association.
^{3} Includes hockey clubs based in today's Russia and Ukraine, and Soviet national teams.
^{4} Includes hockey clubs from the Weimar Republic, the Third Reich, Allied-occupied Germany, West Germany, and today's united Federal Republic.
^{5} Includes hockey clubs from the Kingdom of Italy and today's Italian Republic.
^{6} Includes CSKA Moscow's Cup win in 1991.
^{7} Includes hockey clubs from the French Third Republic, the Fourth Republic, and today's Fifth Republic.
