= 2004 Spengler Cup =

2004 Spengler Cup Davos, Switzerland
Tournament details
- Host country: Switzerland
- Venue(s): Eisstadion Davos, Davos
- Dates: 26 – 31 December 2004
- Teams: 5

Final positions
- Champions: (Switzerland) HC Davos (13th title)
- Runners-up: (Czech Republic) HC Sparta Praha

Tournament statistics
- Games played: 11
- Goals scored: 72 (6.55 per game)
- Attendance: 80,524 (7,320 per game)
- Scoring leader: Rick Nash (7 pts)

The 2004 Spengler Cup was held in Davos, Switzerland from December 26 to December 31, 2004. All matches were played at HC Davos's home arena, Eisstadion Davos. The final was won 2–0 by HC Davos over HC Sparta Praha.

== Teams participating ==
- (Switzerland) HC Davos
- (Czech Republic) HC Sparta Praha
- Team Canada
- (Russia) Metallurg Magnitogorsk
- (Finland) HIFK

== Tournament ==
=== Round-Robin results ===
Team	Pld	W	OTW	OTL	L	GF	GA	GD	Pts
(Switzerland) HC Davos	4	2	1	1	0	17	10	+7	7
(Czech Republic) HC Sparta Praha	4	2	1	0	1	18	15	+3	6
Team Canada	4	2	1	0	1	13	10	+3	6
(Russia) Metallurg Magnitogorsk	4	1	0	2	1	14	17	−3	4
(Finland) HIFK	4	0	0	0	4	8	18	−10	0

December 26, 2004; 15:00	HIFK	1:6 (0:1; 0:1; 1:4)	HC Davos

December 26, 2004; 20:15	Team Canada	5:2 (1:1, 2:1, 2:0)	Metallurg

December 27, 2004; 15:00	Metallurg	5:6 GWS (2:2, 1:2, 2:1, 0:0)	HC Sparta Praha

December 27, 2004; 20:15	Team Canada	3:2 GWS (2:0, 0:1, 0:1, 0:0)	HC Davos

December 28, 2004; 15:00	HC Davos	3:2 GWS (0:0, 1:0, 1:2, 0:0)	Metallurg

December 28, 2004; 20:15	Metallurg	4:2 (1:0, 1:1, 2:1)	HIFK

December 29, 2004; 15:00	Team Canada	2:4 (0:2, 0:1, 2:1)	HC Sparta Praha

December 29, 2004; 20:15	Metallurg	5:3 (0:0, 1:3, 4:0)	HIFK

December 30, 2004; 15:00	HIFK	2:3 (0:2, 2:1, 0:0)	Team Canada

December 30, 2004; 20:15	HC Sparta Praha	4:6 (1:2, 1:3, 2:1)	HC Davos

=== Finals ===
December 31, 2004; 12:00	(Switzerland) HC Davos	2 – 0 (1–0, 0–0, 1–0)	(Czech Republic) HC Sparta Praha	Eisstadion Davos
