= HC Davos =

Swiss ice hockey club

- City: Davos, Switzerland
- League: National League
- Founded: 1921
- Home arena: zondacrypto Arena
- Colors
- General manager: Jan Alston
- Head coach: Josh Holden
- Captain: Ken Jäger
- Website: www.hcd.ch

Hockey Club Davos is a professional ice hockey club based in Davos, Switzerland. The team competes in the National League (NL), the highest league in Switzerland. It is generally referred to by its abbreviation "HCD" by the fans. The team is usually a strong force in the league and often bolster their roster with Swiss national team players and players who once played for National Hockey League (NHL) teams. Since 1923, HC Davos has hosted the annual Spengler Cup tournament, which is an invitational competition.

== History ==
HC Davos was founded in 1921. In 1923, Davos presented the first Spengler Cup, one of the oldest tournaments in sports still being played.

HC Davos was led by a forward line known as "The ni-storm" (German: Der ni-sturm) from 1933 to 1950, which included Bibi Torriani, along with brothers Hans Cattini and Ferdinand Cattini. The line was named for the last syllable (-ni) of players' surnames. The ni-storm was regarded as the top line of HC Davos and the Switzerland men's national ice hockey team from 1933 to 1950. During this time, the club won 18 Swiss championships, and six Spengler Cups.

The team was relegated into 1. Liga in 1990, one of the lowest points in its history. After a new beginning, the club moved into the Swiss League, and two years later returned to the NL. Davos has been among the best teams in the league since, with recent league championships in 2002, 2005, 2007, 2009, 2011, and 2015.

== Honors ==
=== Champions ===
- NL Championships (31): 1926, 1927, 1929, 1930, 1931, 1932, 1933, 1934, 1935, 1937, 1938, 1939, 1941, 1942, 1943, 1944, 1945, 1946, 1947, 1948, 1950, 1958, 1960, 1984, 1985, 2002, 2005, 2007, 2009, 2011, 2015

Invitational

- Spengler Cup (17): 1927, 1933, 1936, 1938, 1941, 1942, 1943, 1951, 1957, 1958, 2000, 2001, 2004, 2006, 2011, 2023, 2025

=== Runners-up ===
- NL Championship (13): 1924, 1925, 1928, 1936, 1956, 1957, 1959, 1982, 1986, 1998, 2003, 2006, 2026
- Spengler Cup (26): 1924, 1925, 1926, 1929, 1930, 1935, 1937, 1944, 1945, 1946, 1947, 1948, 1953, 1955, 1960, 1969, 1981, 1993, 1994, 1996, 1998, 2002, 2003, 2009, 2012, 2023, 2025

== Players ==
=== Current roster ===
Updated 29 October 2026

No.	Nat	Player	Pos	S/G	Age	Acquired	Birthplace
13	(Switzerland)	Niklas Jarome Aebli	F	R	19	2025	Seewis, Switzerland
29	(Switzerland)	Sandro Aeschlimann	G	L	31	2019	Zäziwil, Switzerland
58	(Canada)	Frédéric Allard	D	R	28	2026	Quebec City, Quebec, Canada
55	(Sweden)	Calle Andersson	D	R	32	2024	Malmö, Sweden
74	(Sweden)	Rasmus Asplund	F	L	28	2025	Filipstad, Sweden
91	(Canada)	Joseph Blandisi	F	L	32	2026	Markham, Ontario, Canada
70	(Switzerland)	Enzo Corvi (A)	C	R	33	2012	Chur, Switzerland
46	(Switzerland)	Dominik Egli (A)	D	R	28	2026	Frauenfeld, Switzerland
93	(Switzerland)	Yannick Frehner	RW	R	28	2017	Chur, Switzerland
38	(Switzerland)	Lukas Frick (A)	D	L	32	2025	Zuberwangen, Switzerland
28	(Slovakia)	Martin Gernát	D	L	33	2026	Košice, Slovakia
77	(Switzerland)	Nico Gross	D	L	26	2024	Pontresina, Switzerland
51	(Switzerland)	Luca Hollenstein	G	L	26	2024	Mosnang, Switzerland
17	(Switzerland)	Ken Jäger (C)	F	R	28	2026	Davos, Switzerland
90	(Switzerland)	Sven Jung (A)	D	L	31	2014	Oberthal, Switzerland
72	(Switzerland)	Tino Kessler	C	R	30	2024	Weesen, Switzerland
22	(United States)	Brendan Lemieux	LW	L	30	2024	Denver, Colorado, United States
88	(Switzerland)	Tim Minder	D	R	24	2025	Weinfelden, Switzerland
64	(Switzerland)	Simon Müller	D	L	20	2024	Zug, Switzerland
42	(Sweden)	Joakim Nordström	C	L	34	2022	Stockholm, Sweden
66	(Switzerland)	Valentin Nussbaumer	C	L	26	2021	Delémont, Switzerland
21	(Switzerland)	Julian Parrée	F	L	23	2024	Alkmaar, Netherlands
15	(Sweden)	Simon Ryfors	F	L	29	2024	Stockholm, Sweden
62	(United States)	Harrison Luc Schreiber	F	L	25	2026	New York, New York, United States
1	(Switzerland)	Laurin Solèr	G	L	20	2023	Zürich, Switzerland
87	(Switzerland)	Lars Steiner	RW	R	18	2026	Davos, Switzerland
19	(Canada)	Adam Tambellini	F	L	31	2024	Edmonton, Canada
19	(Switzerland)	Guus van der Kaiij	D	L	19	2026	Blaricum, Netherlands
25	(Switzerland)	Beni Waidacher	C	R	20	2024	
18	(Czech Republic)	Filip Zadina	RW	L	26	2024	Pardubice, Czech Republic

=== Notable alumni ===
- Reto Berra (2008–2009)
- Alexandre Daigle (2007–2010)
- Radek Dvořák (2013)
- Loui Eriksson (2013)
- Pat Falloon (2001)
- Niklas Hagman (2005)
- Jonas Hiller (2001–2003, 2005–2007)
- Jonas Höglund (2004)
- Patrick Kane (2012 Spengler Cup only)
- Alexander Khavanov (2007)
- Rick Nash (2005, 2012)
- Joe Thornton (2005, 2012, 2020)

== Franchise scoring leaders ==
These are the top-ten point-scorers in franchise history. Figures are updated after each completed NL/SL/MySports League/ regular season.

Note: Pos = Position; GP = Games played; G = Goals; A = Assists; Pts = Points; P/G = Points per game

Points
Player	Pos	GP	G	A	Pts	P/G
Reto von Arx	C	687	197	414	611	0.89
Ron Wilson	D	197	167	206	373	1.89
Lance Nethery	LW	182	187	169	357	1.96
Josef Marha	C	516	135	167	302	0.59
Michel Riesen	RW	374	170	125	295	1.14
Dan Hodgson	C	142	80	120	200	1.41
Marc Gianola	D	660	49	150	199	0.30
Rene Müller	F	370	65	125	190	0.51
Sandro Rizzi	C	577	87	100	189	0.33
Peter Guggisberg	RW	328	94	90	184	0.56

Goals
Player	Pos	G
Reto von Arx	C	197
Lance Nethery	LW	187
Michel Riesen	RW	170
Ron Wilson	D	167
Josef Marha	C	135
Gilles Thibaudeau	LW	98
Peter Guggisberg	RW	94
Petr Sýkora	C	90
Sandro Rizzi	C	87
Dan Hodgson	C	80

Assists
Player	Pos	A
Reto von Arx	C	414
Ron Wilson	D	206
Lance Nethery	LW	169
Josef Marha	C	160
Marc Gianola	D	150
Michel Riesen	RW	125
Rene Müller	F	125
Dan Hodgson	C	120
Andres Ambühl	C	108
Jan von Arx	D	104
