= List of AHL head coaches =

The American Hockey League (AHL) is a professional ice hockey league composed of 32 teams, founded in 1936. Each team is entitled to one head coach who handles the directing of games and team practices, while providing direction and strategy for their players and deciding which players will play in games and the lines they will play on. In some cases, a coach will only serve on an interim basis, while some teams may have more than one coach who serve as co-coaches. Outside the team management, the coach also addresses the media. Karl Taylor has been the head coach of the Milwaukee Admirals since 2018. He is currently the longest tenured head coach in the AHL.

== Key ==
| Abbreviation | Definition |
|---|---|
| G | Games coached |
| W | Wins |
| L | Losses |
| T | Ties |
| OTL | Overtime/Shootout losses |
| Pts. | Points |
| P% | Points percentage (Note: Points percentage is calculated as follows: (Wins + ½ Ties + ½ Overtime/shootout losses) ÷ Games Coached) |

== Coaches ==
Note: Statistics are updated through the 2025–26 season.

| Team | Coach | Start date (Note: Start date of current term at the team; each date is linked to an article about that particular AHL season.) | Record with team (Note: Coaching records from the current team.) | | | | | | | Career record (Note: Career coaching records in the AHL; records in other leagues are not included.) | | | | | | |
| Team | Coach | Start date | G | W | L | T | OTL | Pts. | P% | G | W | L | T | OTL | Pts. | P% |
|---|---|---|---|---|---|---|---|---|---|---|---|---|---|---|---|---|
| Abbotsford Canucks | Ryan Papaioannou | July 17, 2026 | 0 | 0 | 0 | 0 | 0 | 0 | – | 0 | 0 | 0 | 0 | 0 | 0 | – |
| Bakersfield Condors | Colin Chaulk | February 11, 2022 | 322 | 164 | 123 | 0 | 35 | 363 | .564 | 322 | 164 | 123 | 0 | 35 | 363 | .564 |
| Belleville Senators | Andrew Campbell | December 17, 2025 | 44 | 17 | 21 | 0 | 6 | 40 | .455 | 44 | 17 | 21 | 0 | 6 | 40 | .455 |
| Calgary Wranglers | Brett Sutter | June 20, 2025 | 72 | 23 | 34 | 0 | 15 | 61 | .424 | 72 | 23 | 34 | 0 | 15 | 61 | .424 |
| Charlotte Checkers | Geordie Kinnear | September 28, 2020 | 360 | 208 | 120 | 0 | 32 | 448 | .622 | 649 | 336 | 246 | 0 | 67 | 739 | .569 |
| Chicago Wolves | Spiros Anastas | December 12, 2025 | 50 | 25 | 14 | 0 | 11 | 61 | .610 | 50 | 25 | 14 | 0 | 11 | 61 | .610 |
| Cleveland Monsters | Nick Bootland | June 30, 2026 | 0 | 0 | 0 | 0 | 0 | 0 | – | 0 | 0 | 0 | 0 | 0 | 0 | – |
| Coachella Valley Firebirds | Derek Laxdal | May 28, 2024 | 144 | 78 | 50 | 0 | 16 | 172 | .597 | 549 | 276 | 202 | 0 | 71 | 623 | .567 |
| Colorado Eagles | Jussi Ahokas | July 17, 2026 | 0 | 0 | 0 | 0 | 0 | 0 | – | 0 | 0 | 0 | 0 | 0 | 0 | – |
| Grand Rapids Griffins | Dan Watson | June 14, 2023 | 216 | 125 | 68 | 0 | 23 | 273 | .632 | 216 | 125 | 68 | 0 | 23 | 273 | .632 |
| Hamilton Hammers | Jay McKee | May 29, 2026 | 0 | 0 | 0 | 0 | 0 | 0 | – | 0 | 0 | 0 | 0 | 0 | 0 | – |
| Hartford Wolf Pack | Jay Leach | June 5, 2026 | 0 | 0 | 0 | 0 | 0 | 0 | – | 243 | 139 | 77 | 0 | 27 | 305 | .628 |
| Henderson Silver Knights | Joel Ward | June 25, 2026 | 0 | 0 | 0 | 0 | 0 | 0 | – | 0 | 0 | 0 | 0 | 0 | 0 | – |
| Hershey Bears | Derek King | August 4, 2025 | 72 | 32 | 31 | 0 | 9 | 73 | .507 | 237 | 104 | 112 | 0 | 21 | 229 | .483 |
| Iowa Wild | Stu Bickel | June 29, 2026 | 0 | 0 | 0 | 0 | 0 | 0 | – | 0 | 0 | 0 | 0 | 0 | 0 | – |
| Laval Rocket | Daniel Jacob | July 13, 2026 | 0 | 0 | 0 | 0 | 0 | 0 | – | 0 | 0 | 0 | 0 | 0 | 0 | – |
| Lehigh Valley Phantoms | John Snowden | July 14, 2025 | 72 | 31 | 35 | 0 | 6 | 68 | .472 | 72 | 31 | 35 | 0 | 6 | 68 | .472 |
| Manitoba Moose | Mark Morrison | July 19, 2021 | 360 | 172 | 154 | 0 | 34 | 378 | .525 | 360 | 172 | 154 | 0 | 34 | 378 | .525 |
| Milwaukee Admirals | Karl Taylor | June 29, 2018 | 503 | 276 | 166 | 0 | 61 | 613 | .609 | 503 | 276 | 166 | 0 | 61 | 613 | .609 |
| Ontario Reign | Andrew Lord | July 11, 2025 | 72 | 47 | 20 | 0 | 5 | 99 | .688 | 72 | 47 | 20 | 0 | 5 | 99 | .688 |
| Providence Bruins | Trent Whitfield | July 27, 2026 | 0 | 0 | 0 | 0 | 0 | 0 | – | 0 | 0 | 0 | 0 | 0 | 0 | – |
| Rochester Americans | Michael Leone | May 13, 2024 | 144 | 73 | 53 | 0 | 18 | 164 | .569 | 144 | 73 | 53 | 0 | 18 | 164 | .569 |
| Rockford IceHogs | Jared Nightingale | May 30, 2025 | 72 | 28 | 39 | 0 | 5 | 61 | .424 | 72 | 28 | 39 | 0 | 5 | 61 | .424 |
| San Diego Gulls | Dave Manson | July 20, 2026 | 0 | 0 | 0 | 0 | 0 | 0 | – | 0 | 0 | 0 | 0 | 0 | 0 | – |
| San Jose Barracuda | John McCarthy | May 18, 2022 | 288 | 131 | 123 | 0 | 34 | 296 | .514 | 288 | 131 | 123 | 0 | 34 | 296 | .514 |
| Springfield Thunderbirds | Steve Ott | January 19, 2026 | 34 | 19 | 13 | 0 | 2 | 40 | .588 | 34 | 19 | 13 | 0 | 2 | 40 | .588 |
| Syracuse Crunch | Joël Bouchard | June 26, 2023 | 216 | 117 | 71 | 0 | 28 | 262 | .606 | 458 | 228 | 171 | 0 | 59 | 515 | .562 |
| Texas Stars | Toby Petersen | July 7, 2025 | 72 | 37 | 29 | 0 | 6 | 80 | .556 | 72 | 37 | 29 | 0 | 6 | 80 | .556 |
| Toronto Marlies | Steve Sullivan | July 9, 2026 | 0 | 0 | 0 | 0 | 0 | 0 | – | 0 | 0 | 0 | 0 | 0 | 0 | – |
| Tucson Roadrunners | Steve Potvin | August 16, 2022 | 324 | 154 | 136 | 0 | 34 | 342 | .528 | 324 | 154 | 136 | 0 | 34 | 342 | .528 |
| Utica Comets | Ryan Parent | November 6, 2024 | 135 | 61 | 56 | 0 | 18 | 140 | .519 | 135 | 61 | 56 | 0 | 18 | 140 | .519 |
| Wilkes-Barre/Scranton Penguins | Kirk MacDonald | June 19, 2024 | 144 | 86 | 41 | 0 | 17 | 189 | .656 | 144 | 86 | 41 | 0 | 17 | 189 | .656 |

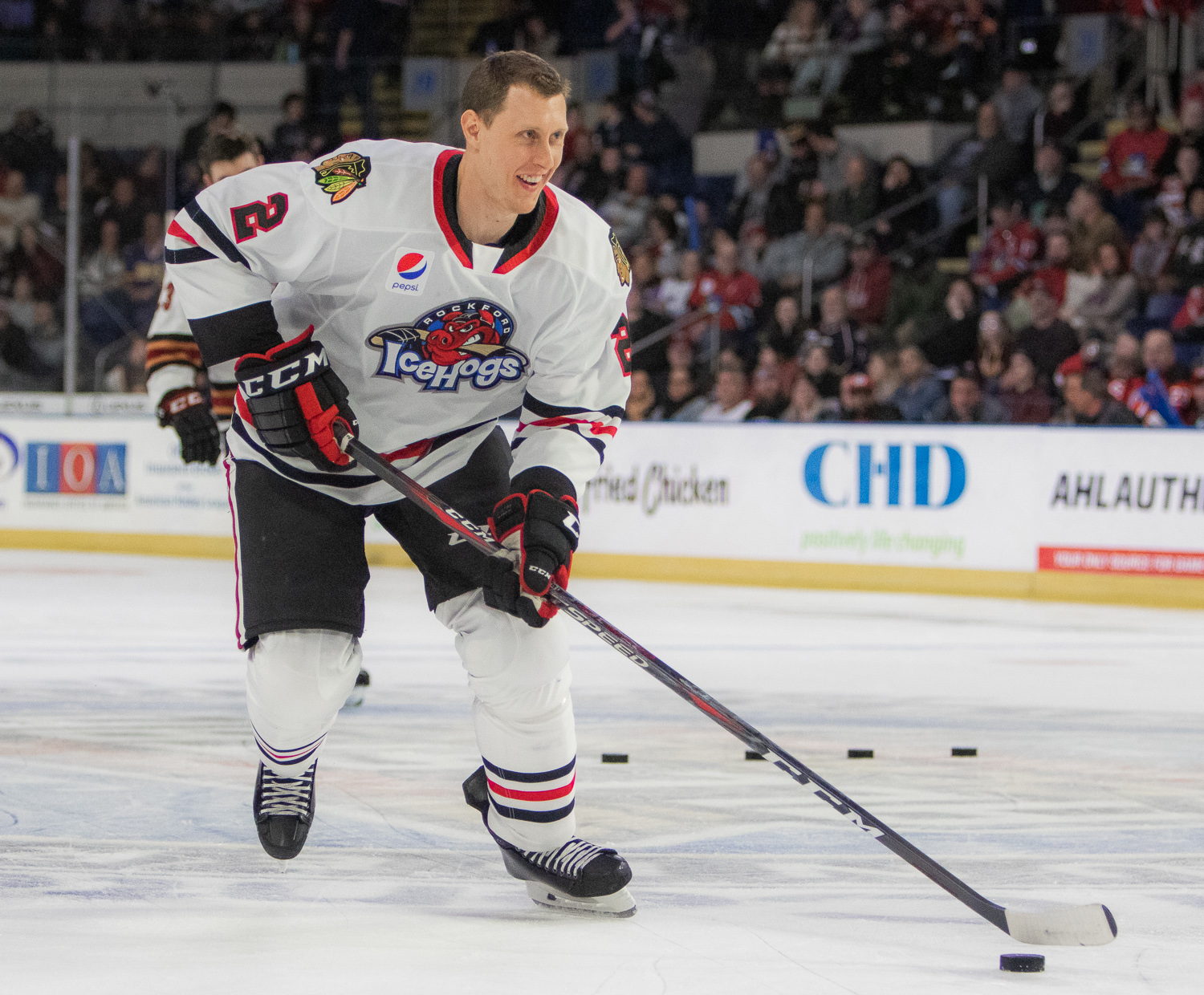
Andrew Campbell, Belleville Senators

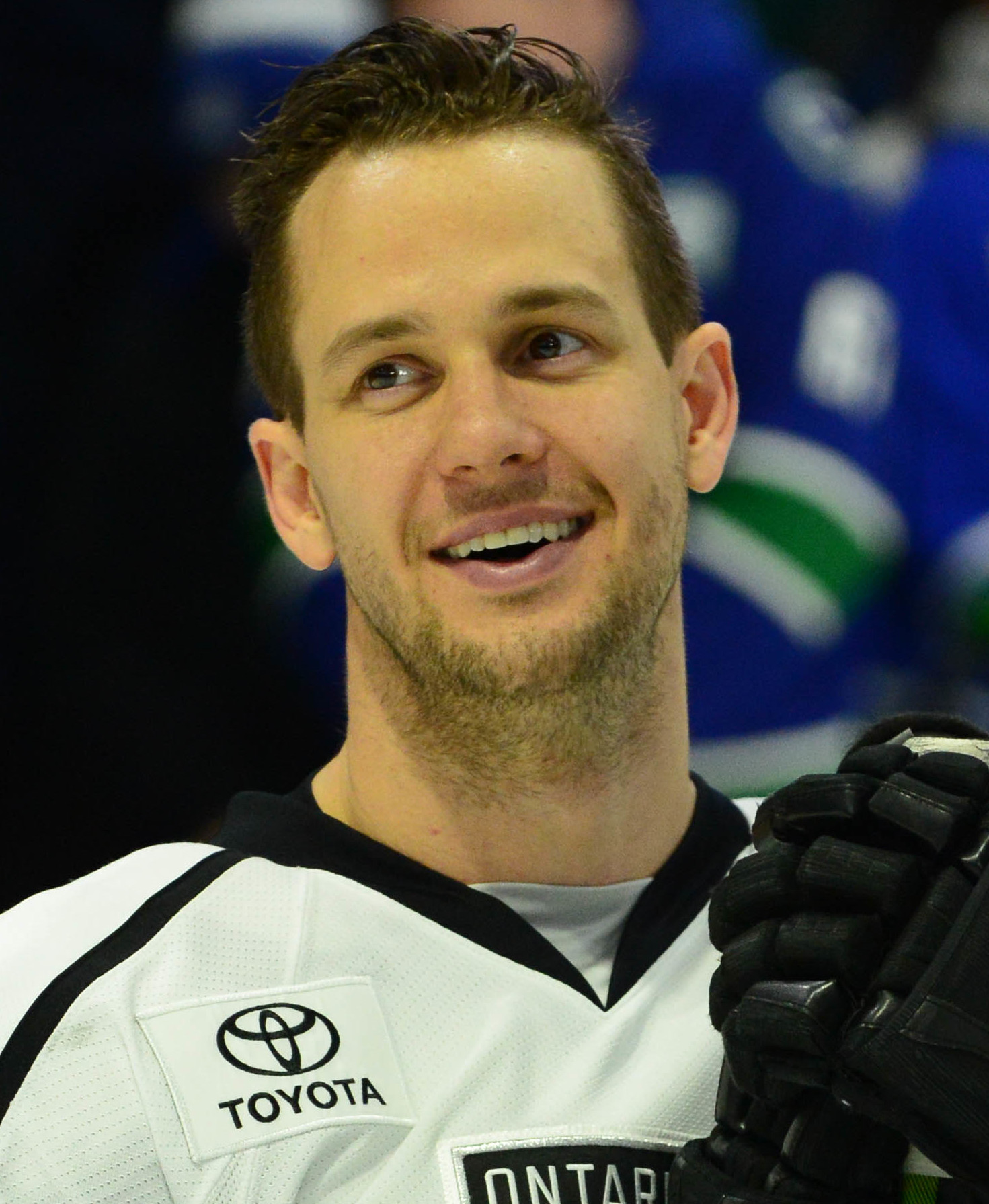
Brett Sutter, Calgary Wranglers

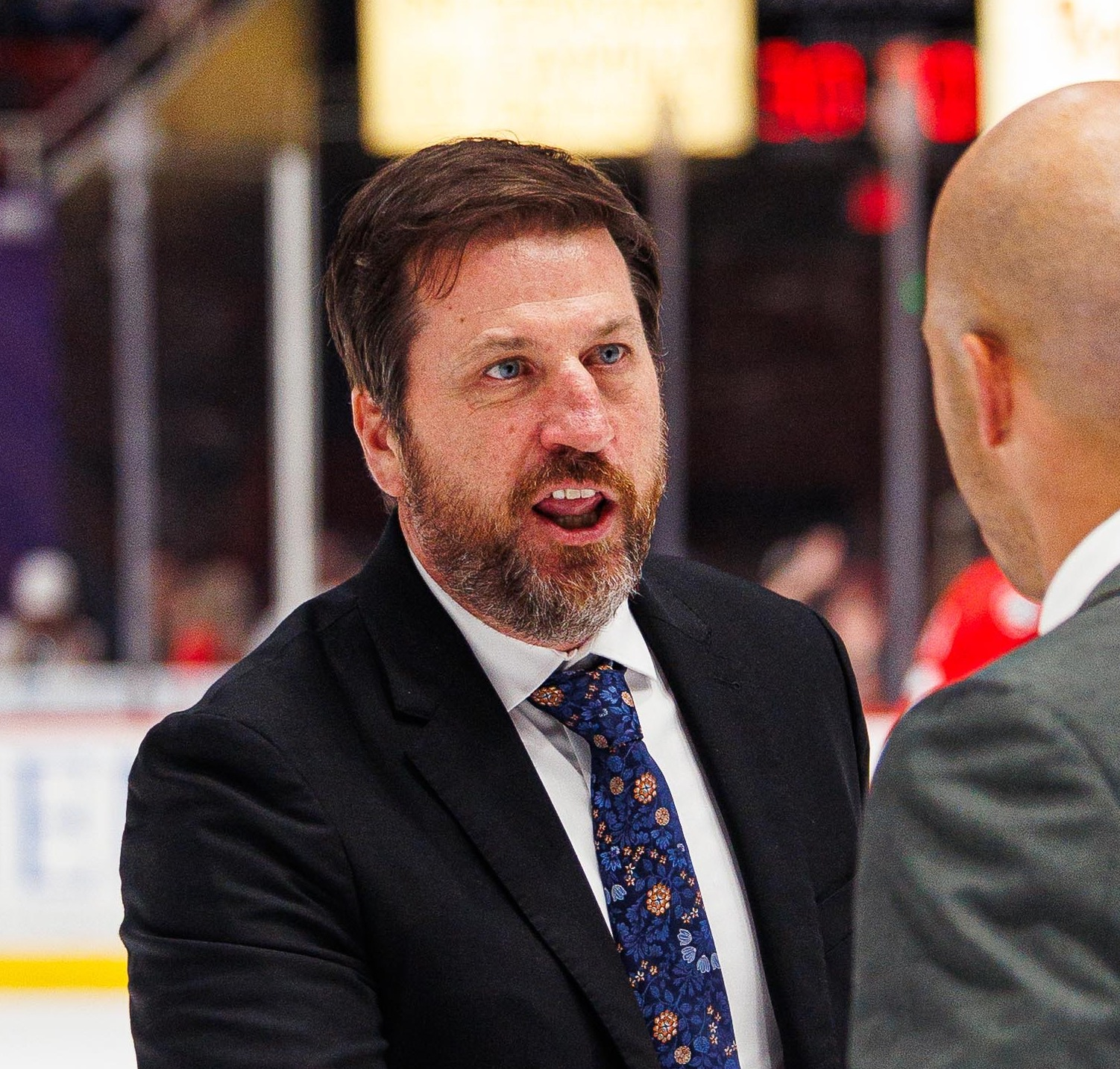
Geordie Kinnear, Charlotte Checkers

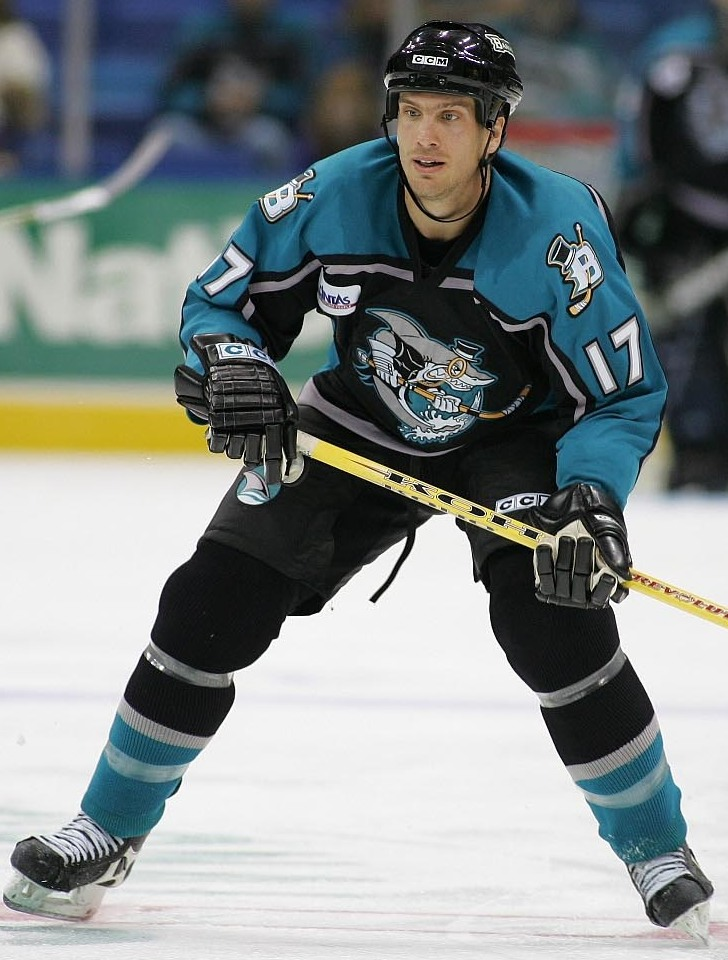
Nick Bootland, Cleveland Monsters

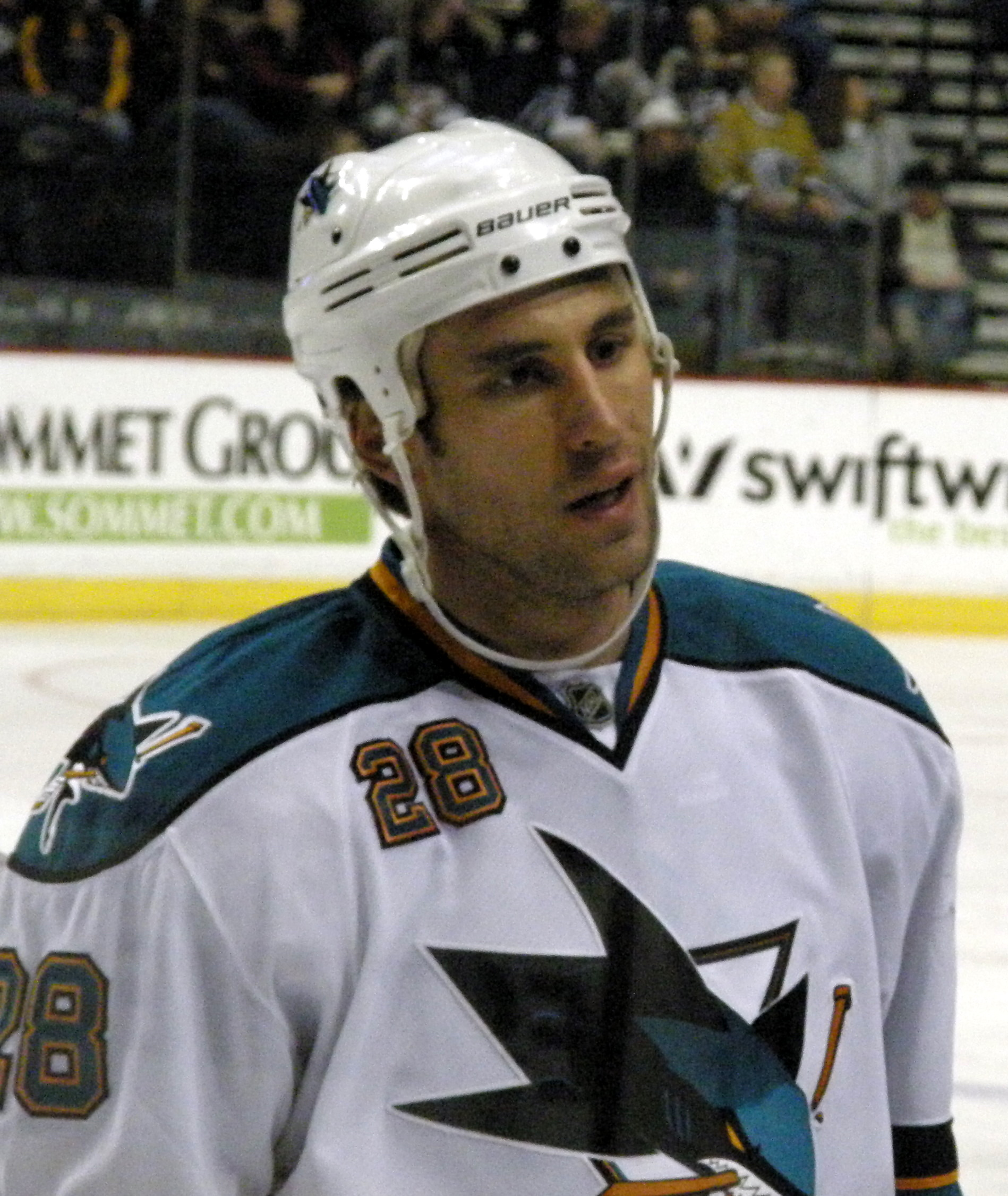
Jay Leach, Hartford Wolf Pack

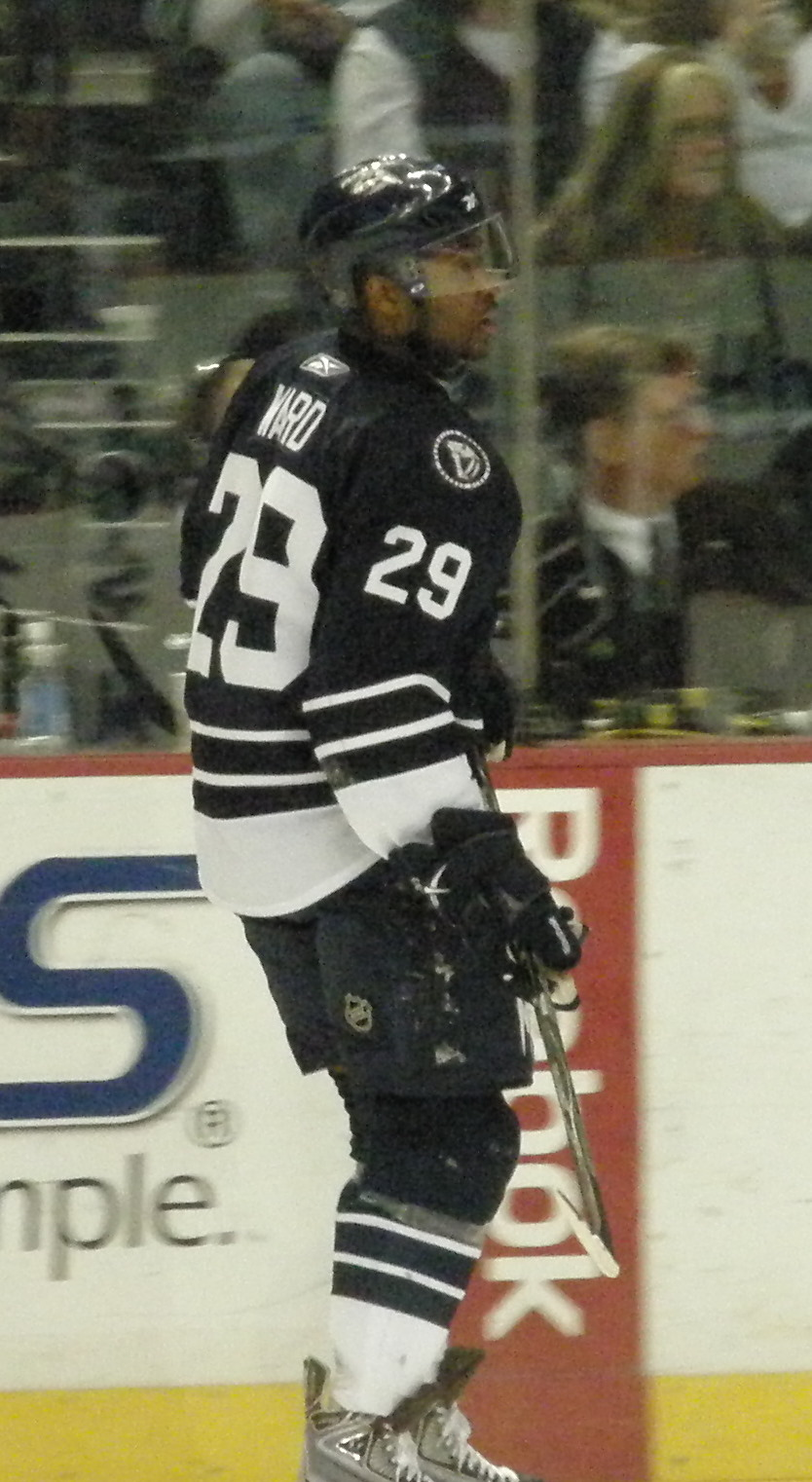
Joel Ward, Henderson Silver Knights

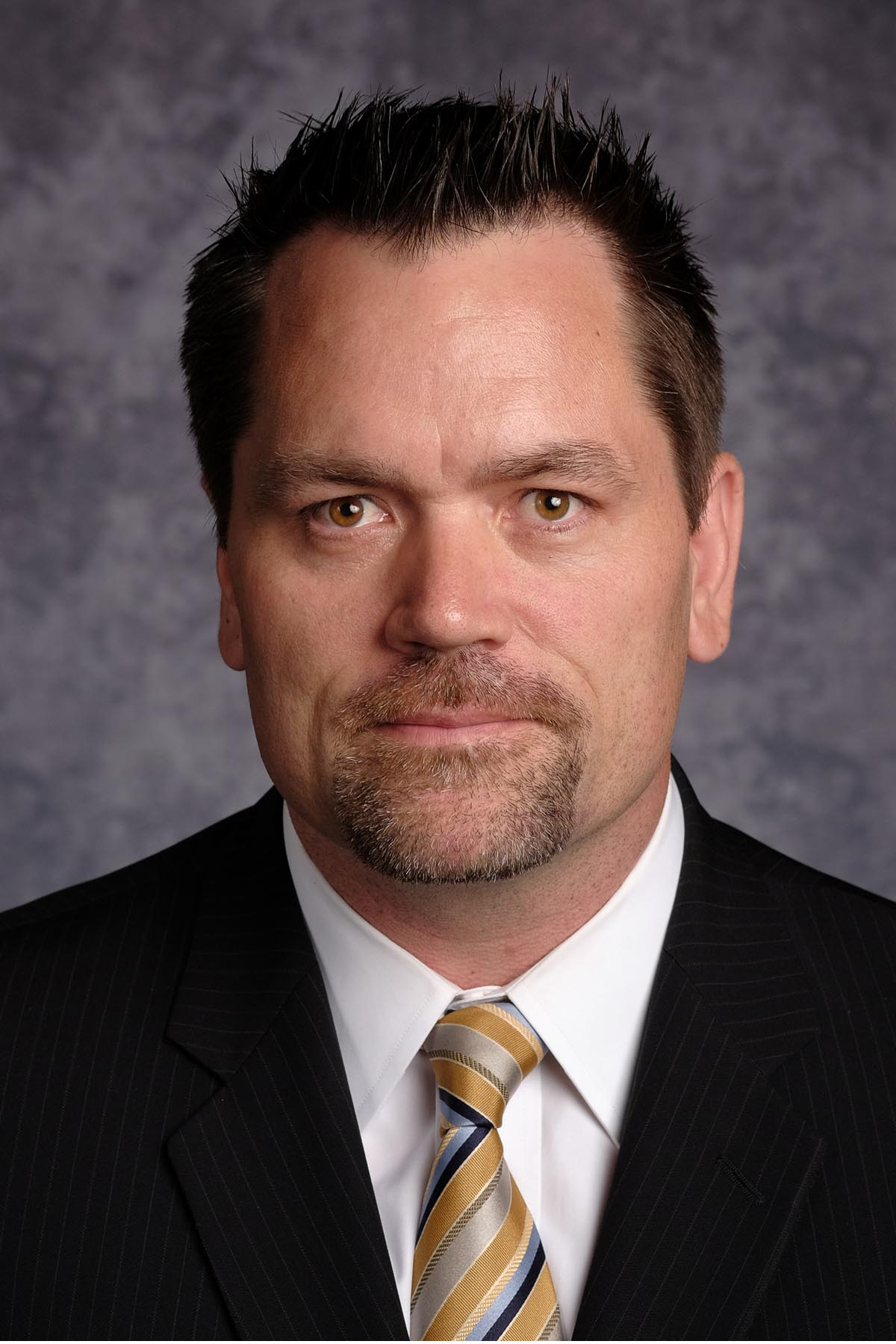
Karl Taylor, Milwaukee Admirals

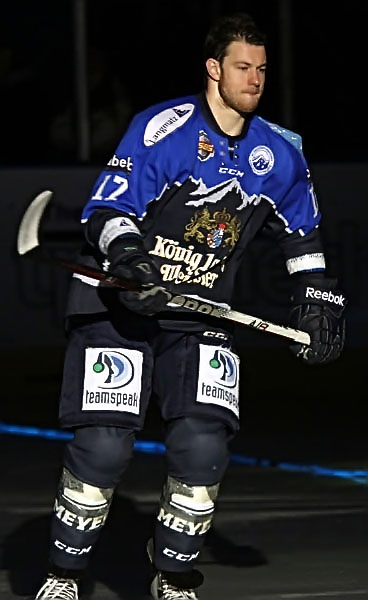
Andrew Lord, Ontario Reign

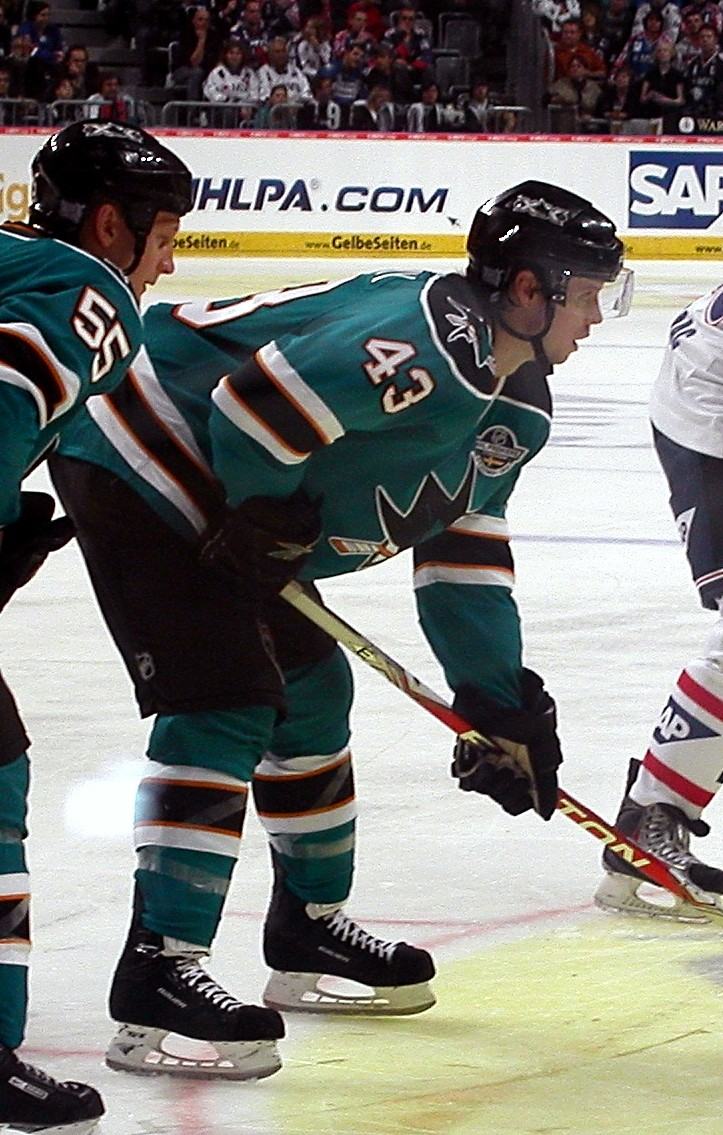
John McCarthy, San Jose Barracuda

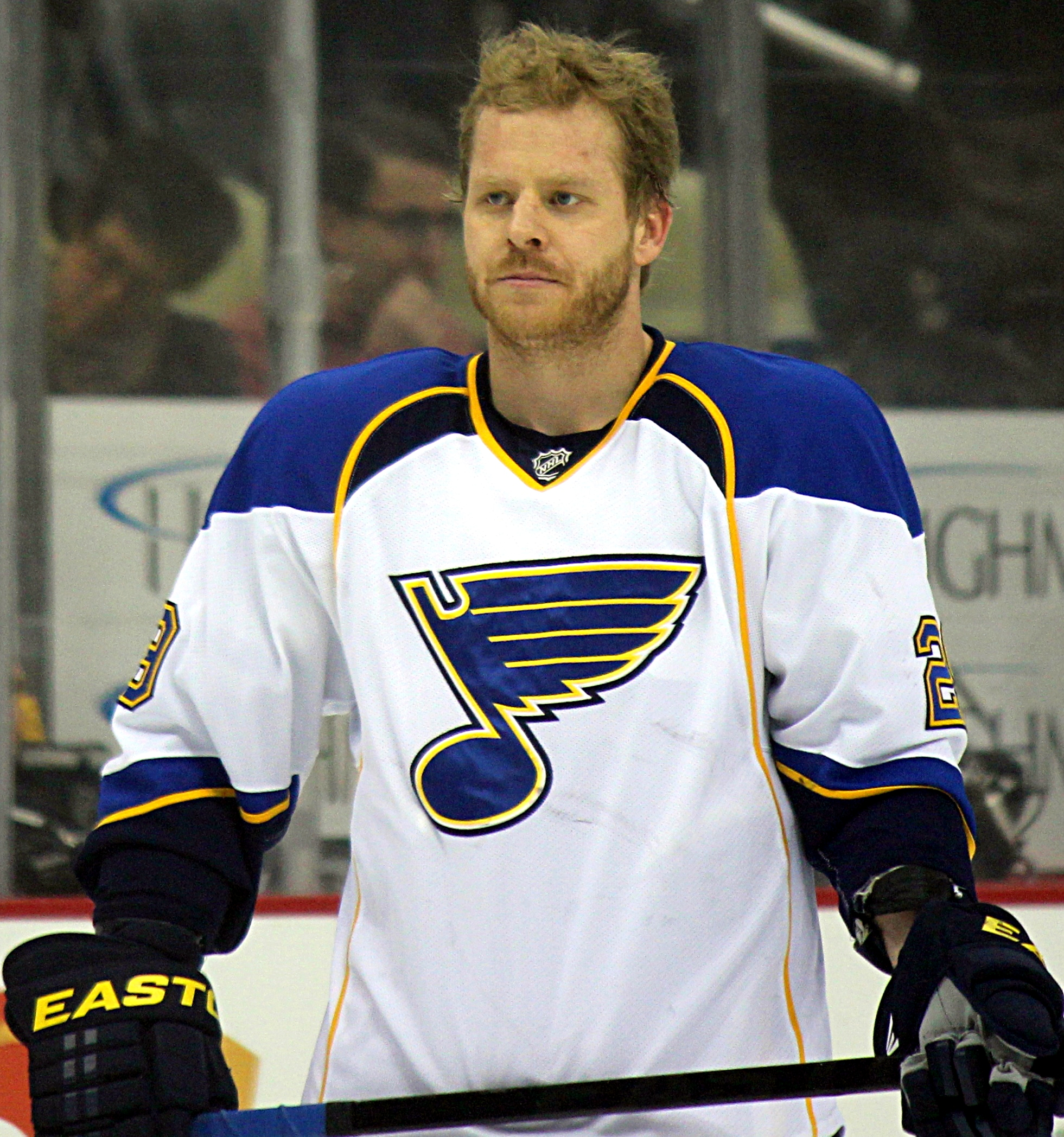
Steve Ott, Springfield Thunderbirds

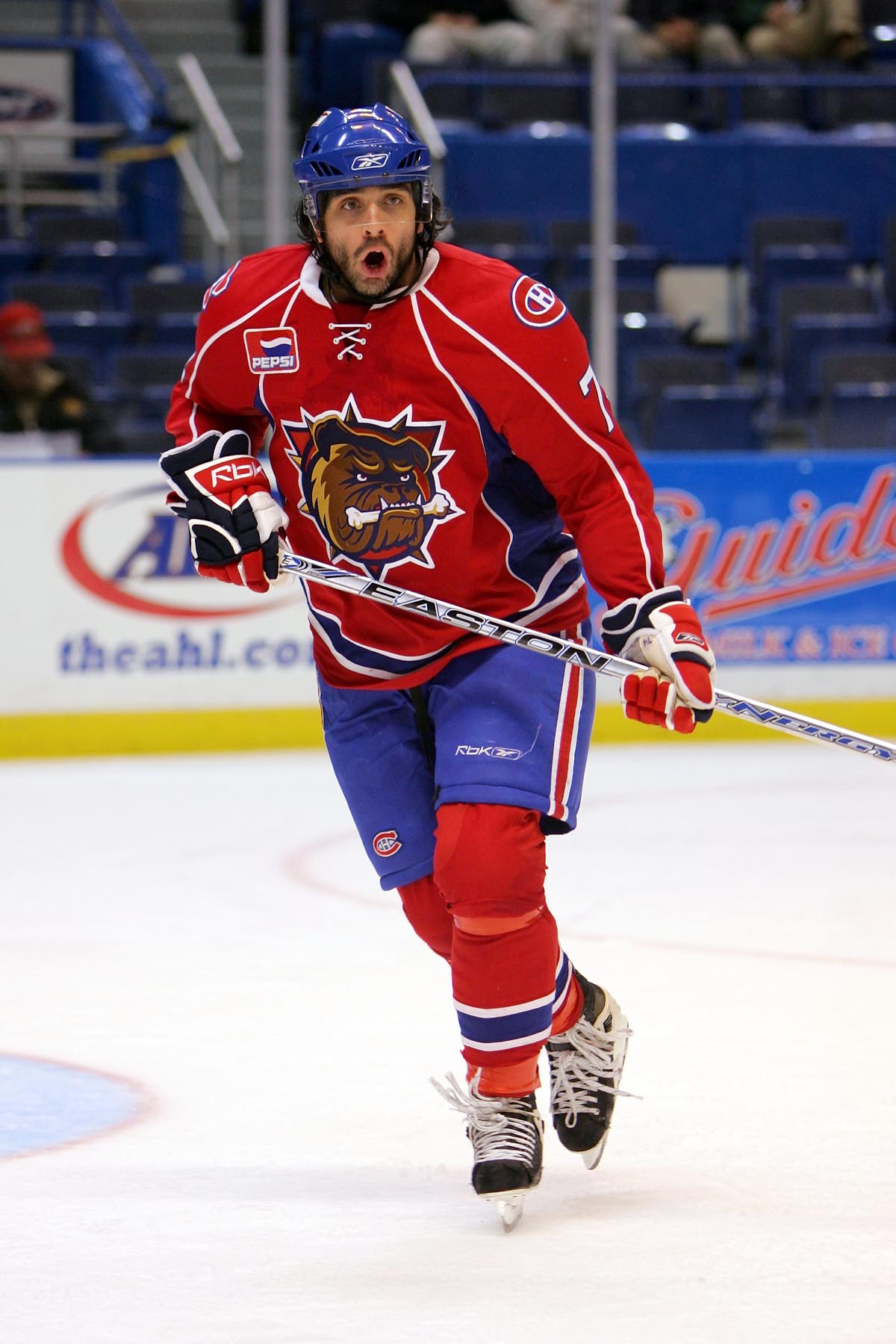
Joël Bouchard, Syracuse Crunch

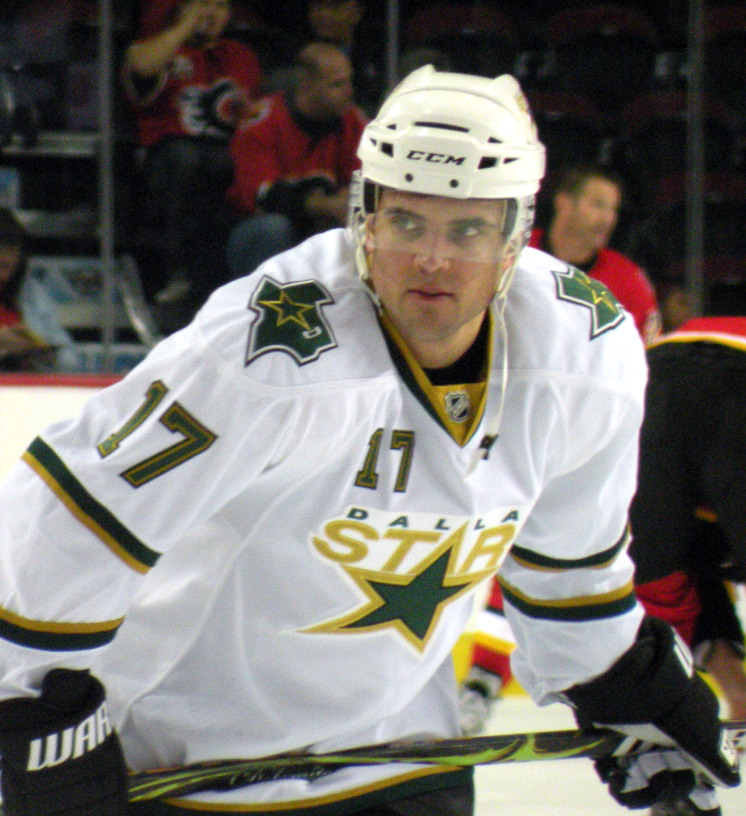
Toby Petersen, Texas Stars

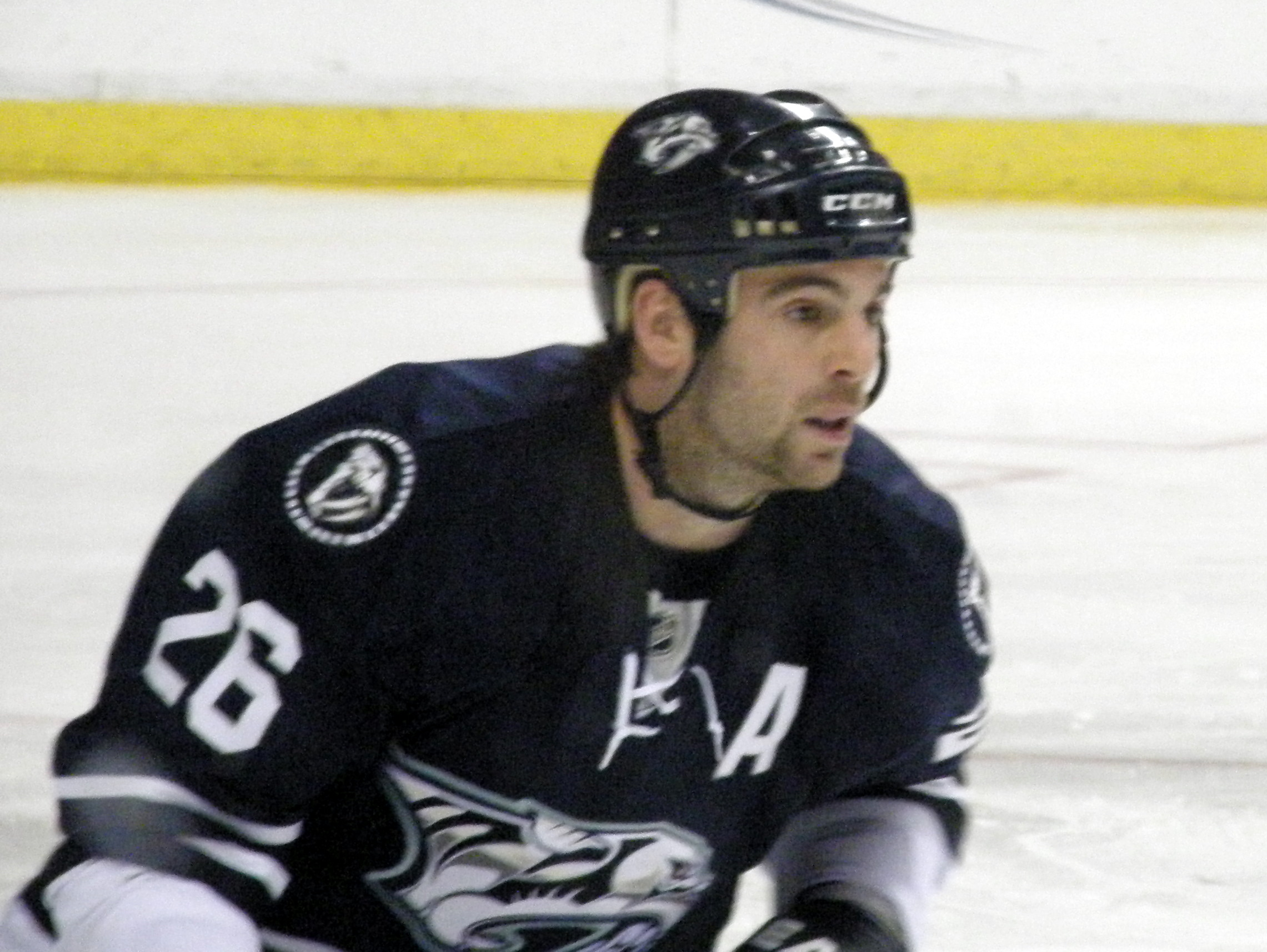
Steve Sullivan, Toronto Marlies

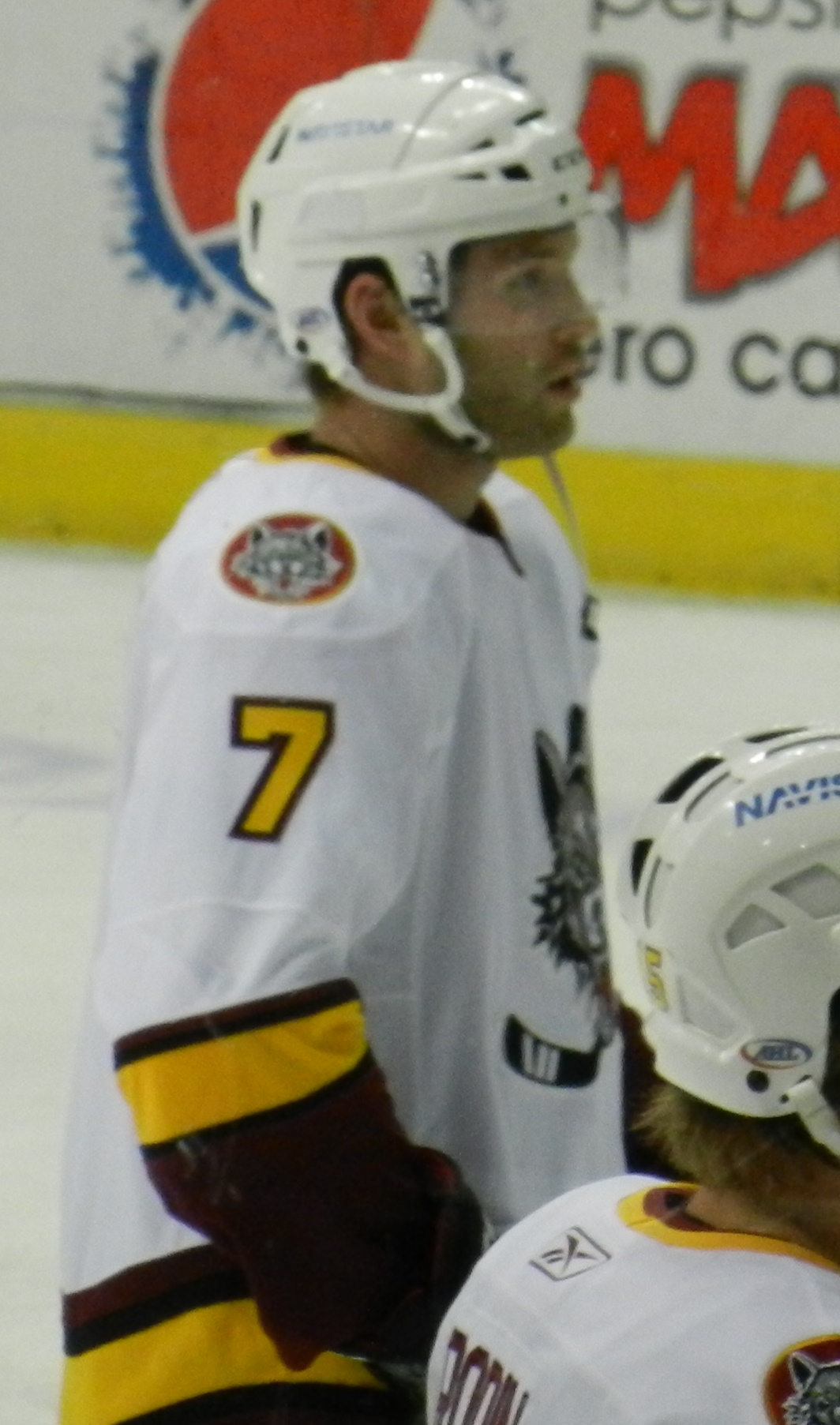
Ryan Parent, Utica Comets

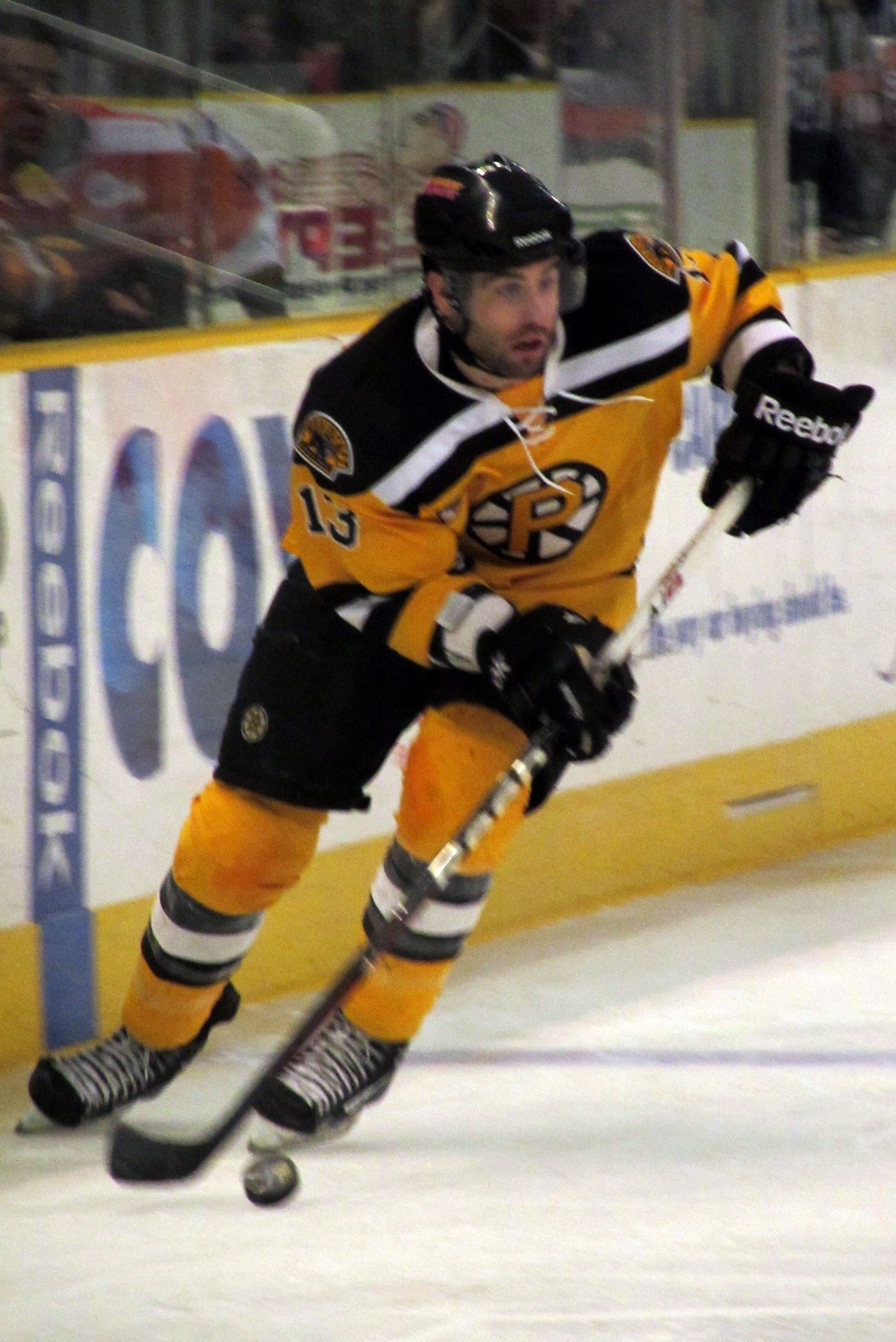
Kirk MacDonald, Wilkes-Barre/Scranton Penguins
