= John Chick (disambiguation) =

John Chick may refer to:

- John Chick (born 1982), American football player
- John Chick (footballer) (1932–2013), Australian rules footballer
- John Stanley Chick (1897–1960), Welsh Royal Air Force officer
- John D. Chick (1891 –1961), Canadian hockey executive
