= American Hockey League =

Ice hockey league in the United States and Canada and affiliate with NHL

- Current season, competition or edition: 2026–27 AHL season
- American Hockey League logo
- Sport: Ice hockey
- Founded: 1936 (IHL/C-AHL Interlocking schedules); 1938 (IHL/C-AHL formally merged)
- President: D. Scott Howson
- No. of teams: 32
- Countries: United States (25 teams); Canada (7 teams)
- Headquarters: Springfield, Massachusetts, U.S.
- Most recent champion: Toronto Marlies (2nd title)
- Most titles: Hershey Bears (13 titles)
- Broadcasters: Canada (English): Sportsnet/Sportsnet One; Canada (French): Réseau des sports (RDS); Europe: Premier Sports; United States (English): NHL Network, FloSports; United States (Spanish): ESPN Deportes
- Website: theahl.com

The alternate logo of the AHL

The American Hockey League (AHL) is a professional ice hockey league in North America that serves as the primary developmental league of the National Hockey League (NHL). The league comprises 32 teams, with 25 in the United States and 7 in Canada.

As of the 2025–26 AHL season, all 32 NHL teams held affiliations with an AHL team. Historically, when an NHL team does not have an AHL affiliate, its players are assigned to AHL teams affiliated with other NHL franchises. The league offices are located in Springfield, Massachusetts, and its current president is Scott Howson.

A player must be at least 18 years of age and not belong to a junior ice hockey team to be eligible. The league limits the number of experienced professional players in a team's lineup during any given game; a team may dress a maximum of six skaters who are both 25 years old (or older) by July 1 of the current season and have accumulated more than 260 regular season games played across the National Hockey League, American Hockey League, Kontinental Hockey League, or the six founding leagues of the Champions Hockey League. Goaltenders are exempt from this rule, and games played in the European Elite Leagues before and during a player's final U-20 year will not count towards the Veteran Rule qualifications.

The annual playoff champion is awarded the Calder Cup, named for Frank Calder, the first president (1917–1943) of the NHL. The defending champions following the 2025–26 season are the Toronto Marlies, winning their second Calder Cup in franchise history.

== History ==
=== Predecessor leagues ===
The AHL traces its origins directly to two predecessor high-level minor leagues: the Canadian-American Hockey League (the "Can-Am" League), founded in 1926, and the first International Hockey League, established in 1929. Although the Can-Am League never operated with more than six teams, the departure of the Boston Bruin Cubs after the 1935–36 season left it with just four member clubs for the first time in its history: the Springfield Indians, Philadelphia Ramblers, Providence Reds, and New Haven Eagles. At the same time, the then-rival IHL saw three of its members fold and two others merge after the 1935–36 season, also leaving it with just four member teams: the Buffalo Bisons, Syracuse Stars, Pittsburgh Hornets, and Cleveland Falcons.

=== 1936–1938 ===
With both leagues down to the bare minimum number of teams to be viable, the governors of both leagues recognized the need for action to assure their member clubs' long-term survival. Their solution was to play an interlocking schedule. While the Can-Am was based in the Northeast and the IHL in the Great Lakes, their footprints were close enough for this to be a viable option. The two leagues' eight surviving clubs began joint play in November 1936 as a new two-division "circuit of mutual convenience" known as the International-American Hockey League. The four Can-Am teams became the I-AHL East Division, with its former trophy, the Henri Fontaine Cup, now going to the champion of the new East Division based on regular-season points. The IHL quartet played as the West Division. with its former championship trophy, the F.G. "Teddy" Oke Trophy, going to the regular-season winners of the West Division. The Oke Trophy continues on, it is now awarded to the regular-season winners of the AHL's North Division, while the Fontaine Cup was retired in 1952, the year the AHL went to a single-division standing.

A little more than a month into that first season, the balance and symmetry of the new combined circuit suffered a setback when its membership unexpectedly fell to seven teams. The West's Buffalo Bisons were forced to cease operations on December 6, 1936, after playing just 11 games, because of what proved to be insurmountable financial problems and lack of access to a suitable arena; the Bisons' original arena, Peace Bridge Arena, had collapsed the previous season (a new Buffalo Bisons team would return to the league in 1940 after a new arena was constructed for them). The makeshift new I-AHL played out the rest of its first season (as well as all of the next) with just seven teams.

At the end of the 1936–37 season, a modified three-round playoff format was devised and a new championship trophy, the Calder Cup, was established. The Syracuse Stars defeated the Philadelphia Ramblers in the final, three-games-to-one, to win the first-ever Calder Cup championship. The Calder Cup continues on today as the AHL's playoff championship trophy.

=== Formal consolidation of the I-AHL ===
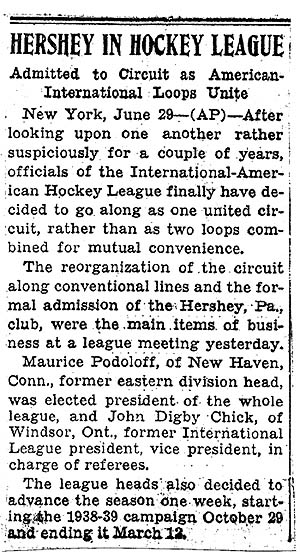
A June 29, 1938 Associated Press article in The Philadelphia Record announcing the formation of the Hershey Bears in Hershey, Pennsylvania

After two seasons of interlocking play, the governors of the two leagues' seven active teams met in New York City on June 28, 1938, and agreed that it was time to formally consolidate. Maurice Podoloff of New Haven, the former head of the Can-Am League, was elected the I-AHL's first president. The former IHL president, John D. Chick of Windsor, Ontario, became vice-president in charge of officials.

The new I-AHL also added an eighth franchise at the 1938 meeting to fill the void in its membership left by the loss of Buffalo two years earlier with the admission of the then two-time defending Eastern Amateur Hockey League (EAHL) champion Hershey Bears. The Bears remain the only one of these eight original I-AHL/AHL franchises to have been represented in the league without interruption since the 1938–39 season. The newly merged circuit also increased its regular-season schedule for each team by six games from 48 to 54.

=== Contraction, resurrection, and expansion ===
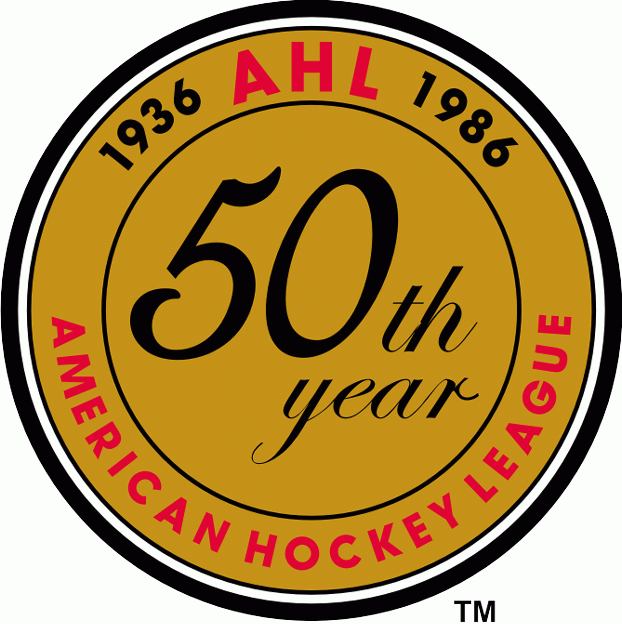
American Hockey League's 50th anniversary logo

After the 1939–40 season the I-AHL renamed itself the American Hockey League. It generally enjoyed both consistent success on the ice and relative financial stability over its first three decades of operation. In the late 1960s and early 1970s, however, the cost of doing business in professional ice hockey began to rise sharply with NHL expansion and relocation (the NHL placed teams in Pittsburgh and Buffalo, forcing two long-time AHL clubs, the Pittsburgh Hornets and Buffalo Bisons, to fold) and especially the 1972 formation of the World Hockey Association (WHA), which forced the relocation and subsequent folding of the Cleveland Barons, Baltimore Clippers, and Quebec Aces. The number of major-league teams competing for players rose from six to thirty in just seven years. Player salaries at all levels shot up dramatically with the increased demand and competition for their services.

This did not seem to affect the AHL at first, as it expanded to 12 teams by 1970. However, to help compensate for the rise in player salaries, many NHL clubs cut back on the number of players they kept under contract for development, and players under AHL contracts could now also demand much higher paychecks to remain with their clubs. As a result, half of the AHL's teams folded from 1974 to 1977. The league bottomed out in the summer of 1977, with news that the Rhode Island (formerly Providence) Reds – the last remaining uninterrupted franchise from the 1936–37 season, and the oldest continuously operating minor league franchise in North America – had decided to cease operations after 51 years in Rhode Island.

The AHL appeared in serious danger of folding altogether if this downward trend was not reversed. However, two events in the fall of 1977 helped reverse the trend. The first of these was the decision of the NHL's Philadelphia Flyers to return to the league as a team owner, and the second was the unexpected collapse of the North American Hockey League just weeks before the start of the 1977–78 season.

The Flyers' new AHL franchise became the immediately successful Maine Mariners, which brought the new AHL city of Portland, Maine both the regular-season and Calder Cup playoff titles in each of that club's first two seasons of operation. The folding of the NAHL, meanwhile, suddenly left two of its stronger teams, the Philadelphia Firebirds and Binghamton, New York-based Broome Dusters, without a league to play in. The owners of the Dusters solved their problem by buying the Reds franchise and moving it to Binghamton as the Binghamton Dusters, while the Firebirds crossed over to the AHL from the NAHL. The Dusters and Firebirds, together with the Hampton Gulls (who had joined the league from the Southern Hockey League), boosted the AHL to nine member clubs as the 1977–78 season opened. Hampton folded on February 10, 1978, but was replaced the next year by the New Brunswick Hawks. With franchise stability improving after the demise of the WHA in 1979, the league continued to grow steadily over the years, reaching 20 clubs by the 2000–01 season.

=== Absorption of the IHL ===
In 2001–02, the AHL's membership jumped dramatically to 27 teams, mostly by the absorption of six teams—Milwaukee, Chicago, Houston, Utah, Manitoba, and Grand Rapids—from the International Hockey League. The IHL had established itself as the second top-level minor league circuit in North America, but folded in 2001 due to financial problems. One oddity caused by the AHL's 2001 expansion was that the league had two teams with the same nickname: the Milwaukee Admirals and the Norfolk Admirals. The latter team transferred to the league from the mid-level ECHL in 2000. This situation lasted until the end of the 2014–15 season when the Norfolk team moved to San Diego and was replaced by another ECHL team with the same name.

The Utah Grizzlies suspended operations after the 2004–05 season (the franchise was sold in 2006 and returned to the ice in Cleveland in 2007 as the Lake Erie Monsters, now known as the Cleveland Monsters). The Chicago Wolves (2002, 2008, 2022), Houston Aeros (2003), Milwaukee Admirals (2004), and Grand Rapids Griffins (2013, 2017) have all won Calder Cup titles since joining the AHL from the IHL. Chicago and Milwaukee have also made multiple trips to the Calder Cup Finals, and Houston made their second Finals appearance in 2011.

The Manitoba Moose moved to St. John's, Newfoundland and Labrador in 2011 and were renamed the St. John's IceCaps after the NHL's Atlanta Thrashers moved to Winnipeg as the second incarnation of the Winnipeg Jets. In 2013, Houston moved to Des Moines, Iowa to become the Iowa Wild. This left Chicago, Grand Rapids and Milwaukee as the only ex-IHL teams still in their original cities until the 2015 relocations when the IceCaps moved back to Winnipeg as the Manitoba Moose.

=== Relocations and western shift ===
Team locations and divisional alignment in the 2014–15 season prior to the franchise relocations

Team locations and divisions after the 2015–16 relocation and realignment

Beginning with the 2015–16 season, twelve franchises have since relocated due to NHL parent clubs' influence on their development teams and players. Of the twelve relocated franchises, nine were relocated because they were directly owned by NHL teams and the NHL parent club wished to make call-ups from the AHL more practical by having closer affiliates.

In January 2015, the AHL announced the relocation of five existing AHL franchises—Adirondack, Manchester, Norfolk, Oklahoma City, and Worcester—to California as the basis for a new "Pacific Division" becoming Stockton, Ontario, San Diego, Bakersfield, and San Jose respectively. The relocated teams were all affiliated and owned or purchased by teams in the NHL's Pacific Division. The franchise movements continued with two more relocations involving Canadian teams with the St. John's IceCaps going back to Winnipeg as the Manitoba Moose and the Hamilton Bulldogs becoming another iteration of the IceCaps to fulfill the arena contract in St. John's.

In the following seasons, more NHL organizations influenced league membership. In 2016, the Springfield Falcons franchise was purchased by the Arizona Coyotes and relocated to become the Tucson Roadrunners and join the one-year-old Pacific Division. The Falcons were subsequently replaced by the Springfield Thunderbirds, the relocated Portland Pirates franchise under a new ownership group. The Montreal Canadiens-owned IceCaps relocated to the Montreal suburb of Laval, Quebec, and became the Laval Rocket in 2017. The Binghamton Senators were also purchased by the Ottawa Senators and were relocated to Belleville, Ontario, to become the Belleville Senators while the New Jersey Devils' owned Albany Devils were relocated to become the Binghamton Devils.

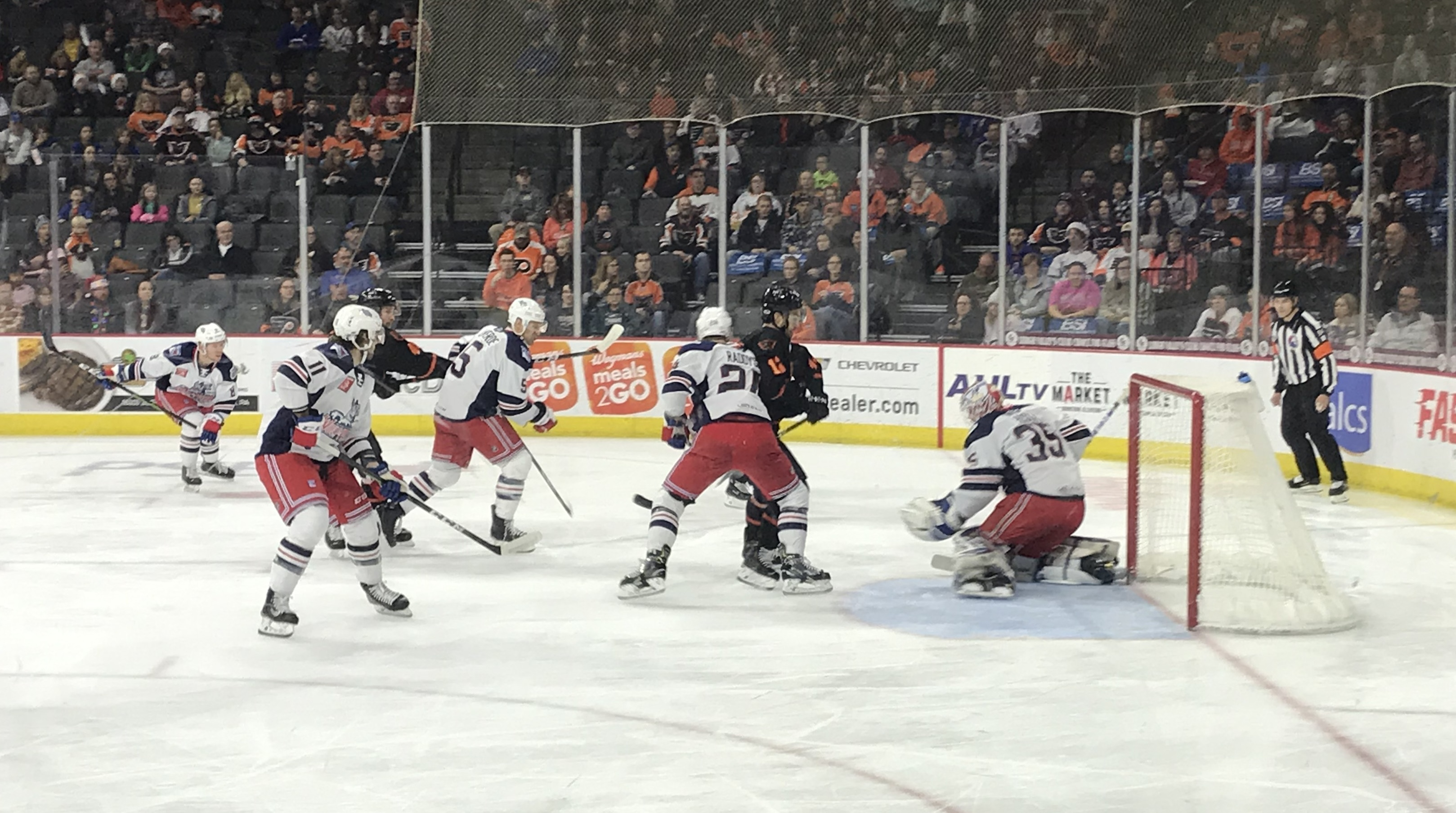
The Lehigh Valley Phantoms host the Hartford Wolf Pack at PPL Center in Allentown, Pennsylvania, December 2019

For the 2018–19 season, a 31st team joined the league with the Colorado Eagles as the NHL's Colorado Avalanche affiliate. With the NHL planning to expand to 32 teams in 2021 with the Seattle Kraken, the Seattle ownership group was approved for a 2021 AHL expansion team, later announced to be the Coachella Valley Firebirds based in Palm Desert, California, following the construction of a new arena. The original plans for the new arena was eventually cancelled and the team postponed their launch by a year while new arena plans were developed.

In February 2020, the San Antonio Rampage franchise was bought and relocated by the NHL's Vegas Golden Knights for the 2020–21 season as the Henderson Silver Knights and was moved to the Pacific Division. For the 2021–22 season, the Vancouver Canucks relocated their franchise from Utica to Abbotsford while the Utica Comets agreed to relocate and operate the franchise that was operating as the Binghamton Devils. On May 23, 2022, it was announced that the Stockton Heat would be relocating to Calgary, Alberta, starting the 2022–23 season.

For the 2023–24 season, the Chicago Wolves operated as the league's only unaffiliated team, making them the first team to operate without an NHL partner since the inaugural season of the Worcester IceCats during the 1994–95 season. Consequently, the Carolina Hurricanes became the only NHL team currently without an AHL affiliate. However, the Hurricanes loaned some players to the Wolves, such as Vasili Ponomaryov, Domenick Fensore, Ronan Seeley and Antti Raanta. On May 2, 2024, the Hurricanes and Wolves committed to a three-year affiliation beginning with the 2024–25 season.

Prior to the 2026–27 season, the New York Islanders relocated their AHL affilite from Bridgeport, Connecticut, to the newly renovated TD Coliseum in Hamilton, Ontario, to begin play as the Hamilton Hammers.

== Teams ==
- Atlantic Division
- North Division Central Division
- Pacific Division

=== List of teams ===
Overview of American Hockey League teams
Conference	Division	Team Name	City	Arena	Capacity	Founded	Joined	Current city since	Head coach	NHL affiliate
Eastern	Atlantic	Charlotte Checkers	Charlotte, North Carolina	Bojangles Coliseum	8,600	1971 (Note: Franchise has moved in the past; see AHL membership timeline below or the team's main article for further information.)		2010	Geordie Kinnear	Florida Panthers
Eastern	Atlantic	Hartford Wolf Pack	Hartford, Connecticut	PeoplesBank Arena	14,750	1926	1936	1997	Jay Leach	New York Rangers
Eastern	Atlantic	Hershey Bears	Hershey, Pennsylvania	Giant Center	10,500	1938			Derek King	Washington Capitals
Eastern	Atlantic	Lehigh Valley Phantoms	Allentown, Pennsylvania	PPL Center	8,420	1996		2014	John Snowden	Philadelphia Flyers
Eastern	Atlantic	Providence Bruins	Providence, Rhode Island	Amica Mutual Pavilion	11,273	1987		1992	Trent Whitfield	Boston Bruins
Eastern	Atlantic	Springfield Thunderbirds	Springfield, Massachusetts	MassMutual Center	6,800	1975	1981	2016	Steve Ott	St. Louis Blues
Eastern	Atlantic	Wilkes-Barre/Scranton Penguins	Wilkes-Barre Township, Pennsylvania	Mohegan Arena at Casey Plaza	8,300	1981		1999	Kirk MacDonald	Pittsburgh Penguins
Eastern	North	Belleville Senators	Belleville, Ontario	CAA Arena	4,365	1972		2017	Andrew Campbell	Ottawa Senators
Eastern	North	Cleveland Monsters	Cleveland, Ohio	Rocket Arena	18,926	1994	2001	2007	Nick Bootland	Columbus Blue Jackets
Eastern	North	Hamilton Hammers	Hamilton, Ontario	TD Coliseum	16,386	2001		2026	Jay McKee	New York Islanders
Eastern	North	Laval Rocket	Laval, Quebec	Place Bell	10,243	1969		2017	Daniel Jacob	Montreal Canadiens
Eastern	North	Rochester Americans	Rochester, New York	Blue Cross Arena	10,662	1956			Michael Leone	Buffalo Sabres
Eastern	North	Syracuse Crunch	Syracuse, New York	Upstate Medical University Arena	5,800	1992		1994	Joel Bouchard	Tampa Bay Lightning
Eastern	North	Toronto Marlies	Toronto, Ontario	Coca-Cola Coliseum	8,140	1978		2005	Steve Sullivan	Toronto Maple Leafs
Eastern	North	Utica Comets	Utica, New York	NBT Bank Arena at the Utica Memorial Auditorium	3,817	1998		2013	Ryan Parent	New Jersey Devils
Western	Central	Chicago Wolves	Rosemont, Illinois	Allstate Arena	16,692	1994	2001		Spiros Anastas	Carolina Hurricanes
Western	Central	Grand Rapids Griffins	Grand Rapids, Michigan	Van Andel Arena	10,834	1996	2001		Dan Watson	Detroit Red Wings
Western	Central	Iowa Wild	Des Moines, Iowa	Casey's Center	15,181	1994	2001	2013	Stu Bickel	Minnesota Wild
Western	Central	Manitoba Moose	Winnipeg, Manitoba	Canada Life Centre	15,225	1994	2001		Mark Morrison	Winnipeg Jets
Western	Central	Milwaukee Admirals	Milwaukee, Wisconsin	UW–Milwaukee Panther Arena	9,652	1970	2001		Karl Taylor	Nashville Predators
Western	Central	Rockford IceHogs	Rockford, Illinois	BMO Center	5,895	1995		2007	Jared Nightingale	Chicago Blackhawks
Western	Central	Texas Stars	Cedar Park, Texas	H-E-B Center at Cedar Park	6,778	1999		2009	Toby Petersen	Dallas Stars
Western	Pacific	Abbotsford Canucks	Abbotsford, British Columbia	Rogers Forum	7,000	1932	1936	2021	Ryan Papaioannou	Vancouver Canucks
Western	Pacific	Bakersfield Condors	Bakersfield, California	Dignity Health Arena	8,751	1984		2015	Colin Chaulk	Edmonton Oilers
Western	Pacific	Calgary Wranglers	Calgary, Alberta	Scotiabank Saddledome	19,289	1977		2022	Brett Sutter	Calgary Flames
Western	Pacific	Coachella Valley Firebirds	Thousand Palms, California	Acrisure Arena	10,100	2022			Derek Laxdal	Seattle Kraken
Western	Pacific	Colorado Eagles	Loveland, Colorado	Blue Arena	5,300	2018			Jussi Ahokas	Colorado Avalanche
Western	Pacific	Henderson Silver Knights	Henderson, Nevada	Lee's Family Forum	5,567	1971		2020	Joel Ward	Vegas Golden Knights
Western	Pacific	Ontario Reign	Ontario, California	Toyota Arena	9,736	2001		2015	Andrew Lord	Los Angeles Kings
Western	Pacific	San Diego Gulls	San Diego, California	Pechanga Arena	12,920	2000		2015	Dave Manson	Anaheim Ducks
Western	Pacific	San Jose Barracuda	San Jose, California	Tech CU Arena	4,329	1996		2015	John McCarthy	San Jose Sharks
Western	Pacific	Tucson Roadrunners	Tucson, Arizona	Tucson Arena	6,521	1994		2016	Steve Potvin	Utah Mammoth

=== Timeline ===
Current member Former member Opted out of season due to COVID-19 pandemic Gold star = Won Calder Cup

=== All-time team list ===
Still-active teams in bold.

- Buffalo Bisons (1) (1936; folded)
- Cleveland Falcons (1936–37; renamed the Cleveland Barons)
- New Haven Eagles (1936–43; folded during World War II resurrected 1945)
- Philadelphia Ramblers (1936–41, renamed Philadelphia Rockets)
- Pittsburgh Hornets (1936–56; went on hiatus to wait for new arena, returned 1961)
- Providence Reds (1936–76; renamed Rhode Island Reds)
- Springfield Indians (1936–42; suspended during World War II; returned 1946)
- Syracuse Stars (1936–40; became Buffalo Bisons)
- Cleveland Barons (1937–1973; became Jacksonville Barons)
- **Hershey Bears** (1938–present)
- Indianapolis Capitals (1939–52; folded)
- Buffalo Bisons (2) (1940–70; folded)
- Philadelphia Rockets (1941–42; folded)
- Washington Lions (1941–43; folded)
- St. Louis Flyers (1944–53; folded)
- New Haven Eagles (1945–46, renamed New Haven Ramblers)
- Springfield Indians (1946–51; became Syracuse Warriors)
- Philadelphia Rockets (1946–49; folded)
- New Haven Ramblers (1946–50, renamed New Haven Eagles)
- Washington Lions (1947–49; became Cincinnati Mohawks)
- Cincinnati Mohawks (1949–52; transferred to IHL)
- New Haven Eagles (1950–51, folded)
- Syracuse Warriors (1951–54; became Springfield Indians)
- Springfield Indians (1954–67; renamed Springfield Kings)
- **Rochester Americans** (1956–present)
- Quebec Aces (1959–71; became Richmond Robins)
- Pittsburgh Hornets (1961–67; folded)
- Baltimore Clippers (1962–76; folded)
- Springfield Kings (1967–74; renamed Springfield Indians)
- Montreal Voyageurs (1969–71; became Nova Scotia Voyageurs)
- Nova Scotia Voyageurs (1971–84; became Sherbrooke Canadiens)
- Boston Braves (1971–74; suspended, became Capital District Islanders)
- Cincinnati Swords (1971–74; folded)
- Richmond Robins (1971–76; folded)
- Tidewater Wings (1971–72; played in Norfolk; renamed Virginia Wings)
- Virginia Wings (1972–75; played in Norfolk; became Adirondack Red Wings)
- Jacksonville Barons (1973–74; folded, franchise purchased and became Syracuse Eagles)
- New Haven Nighthawks (1972–92; became New Haven Senators)
- Springfield Indians (1974–94; became Worcester IceCats)
- Syracuse Eagles (1974–75; folded)
- Rhode Island Reds (1976–77; became Binghamton Dusters)
- Hampton Gulls (1977–78; folded midseason)
- Binghamton Dusters (1977–80; renamed Binghamton Whalers)
- Maine Mariners (1977–92; original franchise became Utica Devils; expansion franchise became Providence Bruins)
- Philadelphia Firebirds (1977–79; became Syracuse Firebirds)
- New Brunswick Hawks (1978–82; became St. Catharines Saints)
- Adirondack Red Wings (1979–99; became San Antonio Rampage)
- Syracuse Firebirds (1979–80; folded)
- Binghamton Whalers (1980–90; renamed Binghamton Rangers)
- Erie Blades (1981–82; merged into Baltimore Skipjacks)
- Fredericton Express (1981–88; became Halifax Citadels)
- Baltimore Skipjacks (1982–93; became Portland Pirates)
- Moncton Alpines (1982–84; renamed Moncton Golden Flames)
- Sherbrooke Jets (1982–84; folded)
- St. Catharines Saints (1982–86; became Newmarket Saints)
- Nova Scotia Oilers (1984–88; became Cape Breton Oilers)
- Sherbrooke Canadiens (1984–90; became Fredericton Canadiens)
- Moncton Golden Flames (1984–87; renamed Moncton Hawks)
- Newmarket Saints (1986–91; became St. John's Maple Leafs)
- Moncton Hawks (1987–94; folded)
- Utica Devils (1987–93; became Saint John Flames)
- Cape Breton Oilers (1988–96; became Hamilton Bulldogs)
- Halifax Citadels (1988–93; became Cornwall Aces)
- Binghamton Rangers (1990–97; became Hartford Wolf Pack)
- Capital District Islanders (1990–93; became Albany River Rats)
- Fredericton Canadiens (1990–99; became Quebec Citadelles)
- St. John's Maple Leafs (1991–2005; became Toronto Marlies)
- **Providence Bruins** (1992–present)
- Hamilton Canucks (1992–94; became Syracuse Crunch)
- New Haven Senators (1992–93; became Prince Edward Island Senators)
- Albany River Rats (1993–2010; became Charlotte Checkers)
- Portland Pirates (1993–2016, became Springfield Thunderbirds)
- Prince Edward Island Senators (1993–96; became Binghamton Senators)
- Saint John Flames (1993–2003; became Omaha Ak-Sar-Ben Knights)
- Cornwall Aces (1993–96; dormant until 1999 and became Wilkes-Barre/Scranton Penguins)
- Springfield Falcons (1994–2016; became Tucson Roadrunners)
- **Syracuse Crunch** (1994–present)
- Worcester IceCats (1994–2005; became Peoria Rivermen)
- Baltimore Bandits (1995–97; became Cincinnati Mighty Ducks)
- Carolina Monarchs (1995–97; became Beast of New Haven)
- Philadelphia Phantoms (1996–2009; became Adirondack Phantoms)
- Hamilton Bulldogs (1996–2015; became second version of the St. John's IceCaps)
- Kentucky Thoroughblades (1996–2001; became Cleveland Barons)
- Cincinnati Mighty Ducks (1997–2005; became Rockford IceHogs)
- Beast of New Haven (1997–99; folded)
- **Hartford Wolf Pack** (1997–2010, 2013–present; became Connecticut Whale from 2010 to 2013)
- Lowell Lock Monsters (1998–2006; became Lowell Devils)
- **Wilkes-Barre/Scranton Penguins** (1999–present)
- Louisville Panthers (1999–2001; became Iowa Stars)
- Quebec Citadelles (1999–2002; merged with Hamilton Bulldogs)
- Norfolk Admirals (2000–15; became the San Diego Gulls)
- Bridgeport Sound Tigers (2001–2021; became Bridgeport Islanders)
- **Chicago Wolves** (2001–present)
- **Grand Rapids Griffins** (2001–present)
- Houston Aeros (2001–13; became Iowa Wild)
- Manchester Monarchs (2001–15; became the Ontario Reign)
- **Milwaukee Admirals** (2001–present)
- Cleveland Barons (2001–06; became Worcester Sharks)
- **Manitoba Moose** (2001–11, 2015–present; were the St. John's IceCaps from 2011 to 2015)
- Utah Grizzlies (2001–05; became Lake Erie Monsters)
- Binghamton Senators (2002–17; became the Belleville Senators in 2017)
- San Antonio Rampage (2002–20; became Henderson Silver Knights)
- Toronto Roadrunners (2003–04; split from Hamilton Bulldogs, became Edmonton Road Runners)
- Edmonton Road Runners (2004–05; dormant 2005–2010, became the Oklahoma City Barons)
- Iowa Stars (2005–08; became Iowa Chops)
- Omaha Ak-Sar-Ben Knights (2005–07; became Quad City Flames)
- Peoria Rivermen (2005–13; became Utica Comets)
- **Toronto Marlies** (2005–present)
- Lowell Devils (2006–10; became Albany Devils)
- Worcester Sharks (2006–15; became the San Jose Barracuda)
- Lake Erie Monsters (2007–16; renamed Cleveland Monsters)
- Quad City Flames (2007–09; became Abbotsford Heat)
- **Rockford IceHogs** (2007–present)
- Iowa Chops (2008–09; became Texas Stars)
- Adirondack Phantoms (2009–14; became Lehigh Valley Phantoms)
- **Texas Stars** (2009–present)
- Abbotsford Heat (2009–14; became Adirondack Flames)
- Albany Devils (2010–17; became the Binghamton Devils in 2017)
- **Charlotte Checkers** (2010–present)
- Oklahoma City Barons (2010–15; became the Bakersfield Condors)
- Connecticut Whale (2010–13; reverted to Hartford Wolf Pack)
- St. John's IceCaps (2011–17; original franchise became the Manitoba Moose in 2015, second franchise became the Laval Rocket in 2017)
- **Iowa Wild** (2013–present)
- **Utica Comets** (2013–present; original franchise relocated to Abbotsford in 2021)
- Adirondack Flames (2014–15; became the Stockton Heat)
- **Lehigh Valley Phantoms** (2014–present)
- **Bakersfield Condors** (2015–present)
- **Ontario Reign** (2015–present)
- **San Diego Gulls** (2015–present)
- **San Jose Barracuda** (2015–present)
- Stockton Heat (2015–22; became the Calgary Wranglers)
- **Cleveland Monsters** (2016–present)
- **Springfield Thunderbirds** (2016–present)
- **Tucson Roadrunners** (2016–present)
- **Belleville Senators** (2017–present)
- Binghamton Devils (2017–21; became second version of the Utica Comets)
- **Laval Rocket** (2017–present)
- **Colorado Eagles** (2018–present)
- **Henderson Silver Knights** (2020–present)
- **Abbotsford Canucks** (2021–present)
- Bridgeport Islanders (2021–2026; became the Hamilton Hammers)
- **Calgary Wranglers** (2022–present)
- **Coachella Valley Firebirds** (2022–present)
- **Hamilton Hammers** (2026–present)

== Presidents ==
Presidents of the American Hockey League
Name	Tenure
Maurice Podoloff	1936–1952
Emory D. Jones	1952–1953
John B. Sollenberger	1953–1954
John D. Chick	1954–1957
Richard F. Canning	1957–1961
James G. Balmer	1961–1964
John T. Riley	1964–1966
Jack A. Butterfield	1966–1994
David A. Andrews	1994–2020
D. Scott Howson	2020–present

== All-Star Game ==
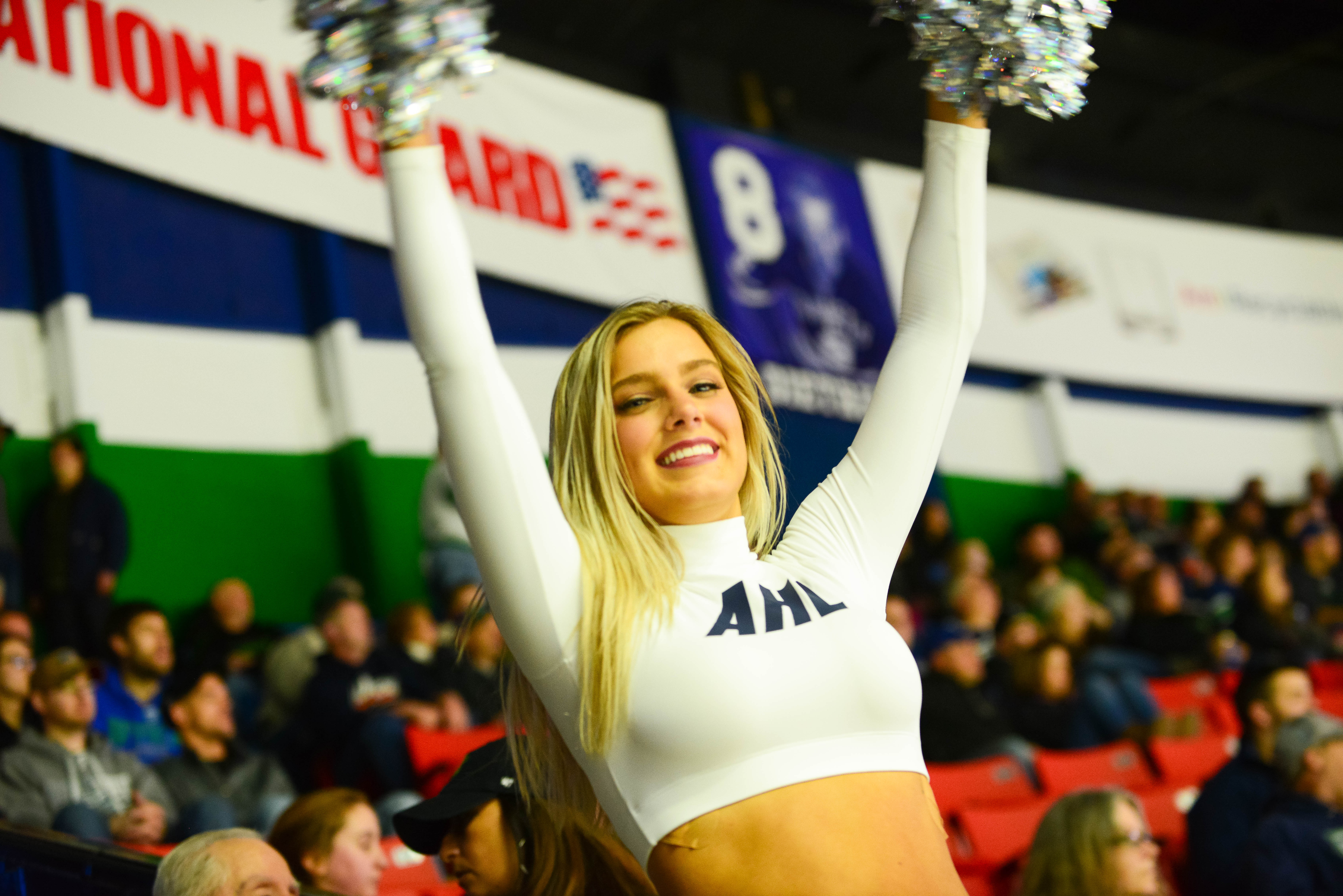
Cheerleader cheering at the All-Star Game, 2018

The American Hockey League first held an All-Star Game in the 1941–42 season as a fundraiser for American Red Cross and Canadian Red Cross efforts during World War II. Players from the Eastern Division faced off against players from the Western Division at Cleveland Arena.

The event was not played again until the 1954–55 season, and was then held annually until the 1959–60 season. These six annual games pitted a team of all-stars against the defending Calder Cup champions (with the exception of the 1959-60 event, which featured the Springfield Indians).

The modern AHL All-Star Game was reinstituted for the 1994–95 season and a skills competition was introduced in 1995–96, with the two-day event being dubbed the AHL All-Star Classic. The 1995 and 1996 games featured players from teams based in Canada taking on players from teams based in the United States. Beginning in 1997, Canadian-born players faced players born outside Canada (known as the "World" team in 1997 and "PlanetUSA" from 1998 to 2010).

The format was revamped again in 2011 to pit the Eastern Conference against the Western Conference. In 2014, a team of AHL all-stars hosted the Swedish Hockey League club Färjestad BK.

Since 2016, the all-star game has been replaced by the AHL All-Star Challenge, a three-on-three round-robin tournament among teams from the league's four divisions; the top two teams advance to the final game, with the winner declared the challenge champions.

The AHL All-Star Classic was postponed in 2021 and 2022 due to the COVID-19 pandemic. The Laval Rocket, who had been selected to host, ultimately hosted the event in 2023.

Overview of American Hockey League All-Star Games
Date	Arena	City	Winner	Score	Runner-up	Attendance
February 3, 1942	Cleveland Arena	Cleveland, OH	East All-Stars	5–4	West All-Stars	3,580
October 27, 1954	Hershey Sports Arena	Hershey, PA	AHL All-Stars	7–3	Cleveland Barons	2,534
January 10, 1956	Duquesne Gardens	Pittsburgh, PA	AHL All-Stars	4–4	Pittsburgh Hornets	2,032
October 23, 1956	Rhode Island Auditorium	Providence, RI	Providence Reds	4–0	AHL All-Stars	3,300
October 6, 1957	Rochester Community War Memorial	Rochester, NY	AHL All-Stars	5–2	Cleveland Barons	3,219
January 15, 1959	Hershey Sports Arena	Hershey, PA	Hershey Bears	5–2	AHL All-Stars	3,871
December 10, 1959	Eastern States Coliseum	West Springfield, MA	Springfield Indians	8–3	AHL All-Stars	1,563
January 17, 1995	Providence Civic Center	Providence, RI	Canada	6–4	USA	11,909
January 16, 1996	Hersheypark Arena	Hershey, PA	USA	6–5	Canada	6,523
January 16, 1997	Harbour Station	Saint John, NB	World	3–2 (SO)	Canada	6,613
February 11, 1998	Onondaga County War Memorial Arena	Syracuse, NY	Canada	11–10	PlanetUSA	6,230
January 25, 1999	First Union Center	Philadelphia, PA	PlanetUSA	5–4 (SO)	Canada	14,120
January 17, 2000	Blue Cross Arena	Rochester, NY	Canada	8–3	PlanetUSA	10,588
January 15, 2001	First Union Arena at Casey Plaza	Wilkes-Barre, PA	Canada	11–10	PlanetUSA	8,314
February 14, 2002	Mile One Stadium	St. John's, NL	Canada	13–11	PlanetUSA	6,247
February 3, 2003	Cumberland County Civic Center	Portland, ME	Canada	10–7	PlanetUSA	6,499
February 9, 2004	Van Andel Arena	Grand Rapids, MI	Canada	9–5	PlanetUSA	9,220
February 14, 2005	Verizon Wireless Arena	Manchester, NH	PlanetUSA	5–4	Canada	9,916
February 1, 2006	MTS Centre	Winnipeg, MB	Canada	9–4	PlanetUSA	15,015
January 29, 2007	Ricoh Coliseum	Toronto, ON	PlanetUSA	7–6	Canada	7,839
January 28, 2008	Broome County Veterans Memorial Arena	Binghamton, NY	Canada	9–8 (SO)	PlanetUSA	4,710
January 26, 2009	DCU Center	Worcester, MA	PlanetUSA	14–11	Canada	7,245
January 19, 2010	Cumberland County Civic Center	Portland, ME	Canada	10–9 (SO)	PlanetUSA	5,225
January 31, 2011	Giant Center	Hershey, PA	East All-Stars	11–8	West All-Stars	10,736
January 30, 2012	Boardwalk Hall	Atlantic City, NJ	West All-Stars	8–7 (SO)	East All-Stars	6,113
January 28, 2013	Dunkin' Donuts Center	Providence, RI	West All-Stars	7–6	East All-Stars	10,846
February 12, 2014	Mile One Centre	St. John's, NL	AHL All-Stars	7–2	Färjestad BK	6,287
January 26, 2015	Utica Memorial Auditorium	Utica, NY	West All-Stars	14–12	East All-Stars	3,835
February 1, 2016	Oncenter War Memorial Arena	Syracuse, NY	Round robin results: Pacific 0–1 North; Central 2–1 Atlantic (SO); Central 4–2 North; Pacific 1–2 Atlantic; Central 4–6 Pacific; Atlantic 4–1 North			5,710
February 1, 2016	Oncenter War Memorial Arena	Syracuse, NY	Central Division	4–0	Atlantic Division	5,710
January 30, 2017	PPL Center	Allentown, PA	Round robin results: Central 1–2 Atlantic; Pacific 3–6 North; Central 2–1 North (SO); Pacific 1–6 Atlantic; Pacific 3–5 Central; North 0–2 Atlantic			8,451
January 30, 2017	PPL Center	Allentown, PA	Central Division	1–0 (SO)	Atlantic Division	8,451
January 29, 2018	Utica Memorial Auditorium	Utica, NY	Round robin results: Pacific 5–3 North; Central 2–5 Atlantic; Central 2–4 North; Pacific 4–3 Atlantic; Central 3–4 Pacific; Atlantic 3–4 North			3,917
January 29, 2018	Utica Memorial Auditorium	Utica, NY	North Division	1–0	Pacific Division	3,917
January 28, 2019	MassMutual Center	Springfield, MA	Round robin results: Central 1–3 Atlantic; Pacific 4–2 North; Central 2–4 North; Pacific 2–5 Atlantic; Central 5–3 Pacific; North 4–1 Atlantic			6,793
January 28, 2019	MassMutual Center	Springfield, MA	North Division	1–0 (SO)	Atlantic Division	6,793
January 27, 2020	Toyota Arena	Ontario, CA	Round robin results: North 5–6 Pacific (SO); Atlantic 1–3 Central; North 5–6 Central; Atlantic 3–2 Pacific; Atlantic 5–2 North; Central 4–5 Pacific (SO)			7,100
January 27, 2020	Toyota Arena	Ontario, CA	Atlantic Division	3–1	Central Division	7,100
February 6, 2023	Place Bell	Laval, QC	Round robin results: North 2–2 Pacific (SO); Atlantic 4–3 Central (SO); North 2–2 Central (SO); Atlantic 2–6 Pacific; Atlantic 3–2 North (SO); Central 2–5 Pacific			9,887
February 6, 2023	Place Bell	Laval, QC	Pacific Division	1–0	Atlantic Division	9,887
February 5, 2024	Tech CU Arena	San Jose, CA	Round robin results: North 1–1 Pacific (SO); Central 4–1 Atlantic; North 3–2 Central (SO); Atlantic 2–2 Pacific (SO); Atlantic 6–1 North; Pacific 4–3 Central (SO)			4,200
February 5, 2024	Tech CU Arena	San Jose, CA	Pacific Division	3–2	Atlantic Division	4,200
February 3, 2025	Acrisure Arena	Palm Desert, CA	Round robin results: Pacific 3–2 North; Central 3–0 Atlantic; North 4–2 Central; Atlantic 4–3 Pacific (SO); Atlantic 2–1 North; Central 5–2 Pacific			8,205
February 3, 2025	Acrisure Arena	Palm Desert, CA	Central Division	2–1 (SO)	Atlantic Division	8,205
February 11, 2026	BMO Center	Rockford, IL	Round robin results: Atlantic 1-1 Central (SO); Pacific 4–1 North; Pacific 3–2 Atlantic; North 3–2 Central; Atlantic 4–0 North; Central 4–0 Pacific			6,365
February 11, 2026	BMO Center	Rockford, IL	Pacific Division	3–1	Central Division	6,365
February 8, 2027	Rocket Arena	Cleveland, OH				

== Outdoor games ==
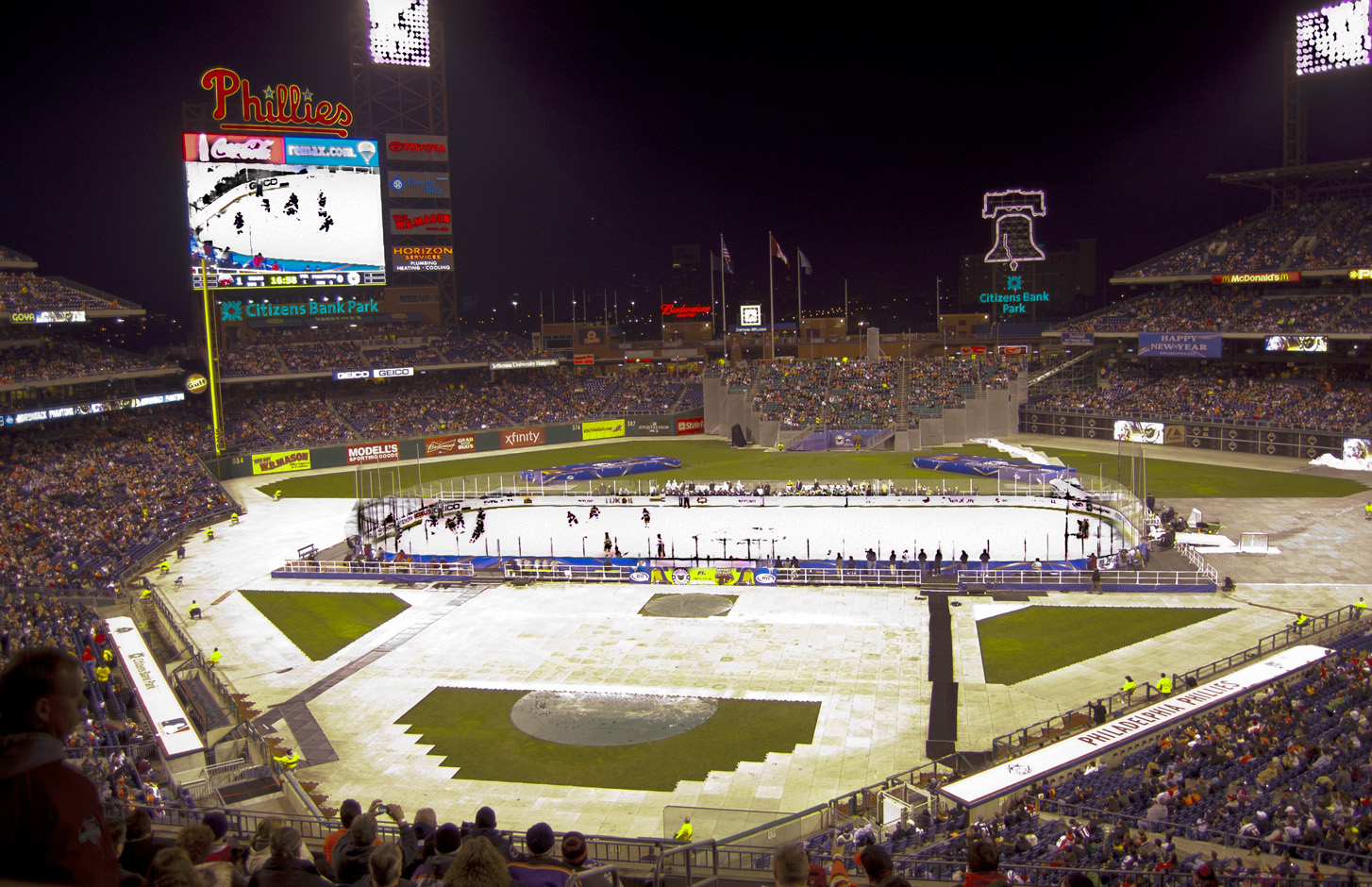
An AHL record crowd of 45,653 watched the Adirondack Phantoms defeat the Hershey Bears, 4–3 in overtime at the 2012 AHL Winter Classic at Citizens Bank Park in Philadelphia

The AHL’s first outdoor game took place when the Syracuse Crunch built a rink at the New York State Fairgrounds in Syracuse, New York. On February 20, 2010, the Crunch packed a record 21,508 fans in for the Mirabito Outdoor Classic against the Binghamton Senators. The contest, which was also televised to an international audience on NHL Network, was won by the Crunch, 2–1.

The Connecticut Whale hosted the Whale Bowl, the AHL's second outdoor game held on February 19, 2011, as part of a 10-day Whalers Hockey Fest at Rentschler Field in East Hartford, Connecticut. Attendance for Connecticut's game against the Providence Bruins was announced at 21,673, the largest in AHL history to that point. Providence won, 5–4, in a shootout.

On January 6, 2012, the largest crowd in AHL history saw the Adirondack Phantoms defeat the Hershey Bears, 4–3, in overtime before 45,653 fans at Citizens Bank Park in Philadelphia, as the final event of the week-long activities associated with the 2012 NHL Winter Classic, which also included a game between the Philadelphia Flyers and the New York Rangers on Jan 2 and an alumni game between retired players (including eight honored members of the Hockey Hall of Fame) of those two clubs on December 31, 2011. The contest was the third outdoor game in AHL history and it more than doubled the league's previous single-game attendance mark.

On January 21, 2012, the Steeltown Showdown between Ontario rivals, the Toronto Marlies and Hamilton Bulldogs, was held at Ivor Wynne Stadium in Hamilton, Ontario, with the Marlies winning 7–2 in front of 20,565 fans, the largest crowd ever for an AHL game in Canada. The AHL game was preceded the previous night by a game between Toronto Maple Leafs and Montreal Canadiens alumni.

Two outdoor games were announced for the 2012–13 AHL season, but a meeting between the Grand Rapids Griffins and Toronto Marlies at Comerica Park in Detroit as part of the festivities surrounding the NHL Winter Classic was not held because of the cancellation of the NHL Winter Classic. On January 20, 2013, the Hershey Bears and Wilkes-Barre/Scranton Penguins met outdoors at Hersheypark Stadium in Hershey, Pennsylvania with the Penguins earning a 2–1 overtime victory in front of 17,311 fans.

The Rochester Americans hosted an outdoor game in 2013–14, the Frozen Frontier, which was held at Frontier Field in Rochester, New York, on December 13, 2013. The Americans took a 5–4 decision in a shootout against the Lake Erie Monsters before a standing-room crowd of 11,015 fans. A year after their originally scheduled date, the Griffins and Marlies played at Comerica Park on December 30, 2013, and Toronto prevailed in a shootout, 4–3, becoming the first AHL team ever with two outdoor wins. Attendance in Detroit was 20,337.

As part of the recent addition of the Pacific Division, the AHL played its first outdoor hockey game in California during the 2015–16 season, called the Golden State Hockey Rush. On December 18, 2015, the Stockton Heat defeated the Bakersfield Condors, 3–2, at Raley Field in West Sacramento, California.

For the second consecutive season, the AHL played an outdoor game in California as the Bakersfield Condors hosted the Condorstown Outdoor Classic against the Ontario Reign on January 7, 2017, at Bakersfield College's Memorial Stadium. Despite sometimes heavy rain during the first period, the game went on as scheduled and the Condors defeated the Reign 3–2 in overtime.

The 2021 AIS Empire State Outdoor Classic was scheduled for February 13th 2021 and to be played at Griffiss Business & Technology Park in Rome, NY between the Syracuse Crunch and Utica Comets but was canceled in 2020 due to the COVID-19 pandemic.

Hersheypark Stadium hosted its second outdoor game in 2018. Cleveland's FirstEnergy Stadium became the first National Football League venue to host an AHL outdoor game in 2023, and Truist Field in Charlotte hosted the Queen City Outdoor Classic in 2024.

On January 23, 2026, the Iowa Wild Outdoor Classic was held as part of Hockey Day Minnesota in Hastings, Minn., with the Milwaukee Admirals defeating the Iowa Wild, 3-2 in overtime. With a game-time temperature of minus-8 degrees Fahrenheit (minus-22 Celsius), it was the coldest outdoor game in North American history.

== International games ==
Teams from the AHL have competed against non-North American teams, in both international tournaments and one-off matchups.

Several club teams from the Soviet Union toured the United States and Canada during the 1970s and 1980s and played exhibitions against AHL clubs, including the Soviet Wings (1974–75), HC Spartak Moscow (1976, 1986), Moscow Khimik (1976), HC Dynamo Moscow (1977–78), Traktor Chelyabinsk (1978–79) and Sokil Kyiv (1989).

Prior to the 1980 Winter Olympics in Lake Placid, New York, the Adirondack Red Wings hosted exhibition games against the national teams from the United States, West Germany, Sweden and Finland. Team USA also played exhibitions against AHL teams leading up to the 1994 Olympics in Lillehammer, Norway.

The Rochester Americans participated in the 1996 and 2013 editions of the Spengler Cup, held in Davos, Switzerland. The Spengler Cup is an annual invitational tournament featuring teams from leagues around Europe and the world. The participation of the AHL in future Spengler Cups has been discussed by both the tournament organizers and league leadership.

In 2014, Swedish club Färjestad BK met the Toronto Marlies as part of a visit to Canada that included its participation in the 2014 AHL All-Star Classic.

In February 2018, the Ontario Reign hosted and defeated the DEL's Eisbären Berlin, 6–3, in a friendly matchup organized by Anschutz Entertainment Group, the owner of both teams.

== AHL Hall of Fame ==
The formation of an American Hockey League Hall of Fame was announced by the league on December 15, 2005, created to recognize, honor and celebrate individuals for their outstanding achievements and contributions specifically in the AHL.

== Trophies and awards ==
The following is a list of awards of the American Hockey League. The season the award was first handed out is listed in parentheses.

=== Individual awards ===
- Les Cunningham Award – Most valuable player (1947–48)
- John B. Sollenberger Trophy – Top point scorer (1947–48)
- Willie Marshall Award – Top goal scorer (2003–04)
- Dudley "Red" Garrett Memorial Award – Rookie of the year (1947–48)
- Eddie Shore Award – Defenceman of the year (1958–59)
- Aldege "Baz" Bastien Memorial Award – Best Goaltender (1983–84)
- Harry "Hap" Holmes Memorial Award – Lowest Goals against average (1947–48)
- Louis A.R. Pieri Memorial Award – Coach of the year (1967–68)
- Fred T. Hunt Memorial Award – Sportsmanship / Perseverance (1977–78)
- Yanick Dupre Memorial Award – Community Service Award (1997–98)
- Jack A. Butterfield Trophy – MVP of the playoffs (1983–84)

=== Team awards ===
- Calder Cup – Playoffs champions (1936–37)
- Richard F. Canning Trophy – Eastern Conference playoff champions (1989–90)
- Robert W. Clarke Trophy – Western Conference playoff champions (1989–90)
- Macgregor Kilpatrick Trophy – Regular season champions, League (1997–98)
- Frank Mathers Trophy – Regular Season champions, Eastern Conference (1995–96)
- Norman R. "Bud" Poile Trophy – Regular Season champions, Western Conference (2001–02)
- Emile Francis Trophy – Regular Season champions, Atlantic Division (2001–02)
- F. G. "Teddy" Oke Trophy – Regular Season champions, North Division (1936–37)^{†}
- Sam Pollock Trophy – Regular Season champions, Central Division (1995–96)
- John D. Chick Trophy – Regular Season champions, Pacific Division (1961–62)

^{†} Trophy predates American Hockey League, established 1926–27 in the Canadian Professional Hockey League.

=== Other awards ===
- James C. Hendy Memorial Award – Executive of the Year (1961–62)
- Thomas Ebright Memorial Award – Outstanding career contributions (1997–98)
- James H. Ellery Memorial Awards – Outstanding media coverage (1964–65)
- Ken McKenzie Award – Marketing Executive of the Year (1978–79)
- Michael Condon Memorial Award – Outstanding service, On-ice official (2001–02)
- President's Awards – two annual awards given out by the AHL. The first award is presented to an AHL organization and recognizes "excellence in all areas off the ice." The second is given to a player as recognition of outstanding accomplishments in that year (2008–09)

Sources:

- AHL Hall of Fame
- hockeydb.com

== See also ==
- American Hockey Association (1926–1942)
- Calder Cup
- List of AHL head coaches
- List of AHL seasons
- List of American Hockey League arenas
- List of Calder Cup champions
- List of sports attendance figures
- Minor league
- List of ice hockey leagues
- Professional Hockey Players' Association, the collective bargaining union for AHL players
