= List of American Hockey League arenas =

The following is a list of current American Hockey League (AHL) arenas:

Arena	Location	Team	Capacity	Opened
Allstate Arena	Rosemont, Illinois	Chicago Wolves	16,692	1980
Acrisure Arena	Palm Desert, California	Coachella Valley Firebirds	10,087	2022
Amica Mutual Pavilion	Providence, Rhode Island	Providence Bruins	11,075	1972
Blue Arena	Loveland, Colorado	Colorado Eagles	5,829	2003
Blue Cross Arena	Rochester, New York	Rochester Americans	11,215	1955
BMO Center	Rockford, Illinois	Rockford IceHogs	5,895	1981
Bojangles Coliseum	Charlotte, North Carolina	Charlotte Checkers	8,600	1955
CIBC Place	Belleville, Ontario	Belleville Senators	4,400	1978
Canada Life Centre	Winnipeg, Manitoba	Manitoba Moose	15,321	2004
Casey's Center	Des Moines, Iowa	Iowa Wild	15,181	2005
Coca-Cola Coliseum	Toronto, Ontario	Toronto Marlies	7,851	1921
Dignity Health Arena	Bakersfield, California	Bakersfield Condors	8,751	1998
Giant Center	Hershey, Pennsylvania	Hershey Bears	10,500	2002
H-E-B Center at Cedar Park	Cedar Park, Texas	Texas Stars	8,000	2009
Lee's Family Forum	Henderson, Nevada	Henderson Silver Knights	6,019	2022
MassMutual Center	Springfield, Massachusetts	Springfield Thunderbirds	6,793	1972
Mohegan Arena at Casey Plaza	Wilkes-Barre, Pennsylvania	Wilkes-Barre/Scranton Penguins	8,300	1999
NBT Bank Arena	Utica, New York	Utica Comets	3,860	1960
Pechanga Arena	San Diego, California	San Diego Gulls	12,920	1966
PeoplesBank Arena	Hartford, Connecticut	Hartford Wolf Pack	14,750	1975
Place Bell	Laval, Quebec	Laval Rocket	10,000	2017
PPL Center	Allentown, Pennsylvania	Lehigh Valley Phantoms	8,420	2014
Rogers Forum	Abbotsford, British Columbia	Abbotsford Canucks	7,000	2009
Rocket Arena	Cleveland, Ohio	Cleveland Monsters	18,926	1994
TechCU Arena	San Jose, California	San Jose Barracuda	4,200	2022
Scotiabank Saddledome	Calgary, Alberta	Calgary Wranglers	19,289	1983
TD Coliseum	Hamilton, Ontario	Hamilton Hammers	16,386	1985
Toyota Arena	Ontario, California	Ontario Reign	9,736	2008
Tucson Arena	Tucson, Arizona	Tucson Roadrunners	8,962	1971
Upstate Medical University Arena	Syracuse, New York	Syracuse Crunch	5,800	1951
UW–Milwaukee Panther Arena	Milwaukee, Wisconsin	Milwaukee Admirals	9,652	1950
Van Andel Arena	Grand Rapids, Michigan	Grand Rapids Griffins	10,834	1996

== Future and proposed arenas ==
Arena	Team	Location	Capacity	Opening	Reference
Scotia Place	Calgary Wranglers	Calgary, Alberta	18,400	2027	
Unnamed Arena	Colorado Eagles	Greeley, Colorado	5,000	TBD	
