= John D. Chick =

John Digby Chick (June 21, 1891 – April 13, 1961) was a Canadian businessman who served as president of the International Hockey League and the American Hockey League.

== Business ==
Chick was the son of Thomas and Mary Chick of Windsor, Ontario. Thomas Chick founded the Chick Contracting Company, Chick Fuel & Supply, and the Chick Land & Building Company. Chick Fuel & Supply supplied gravel for the construction of the Ambassador Bridge and the Metropolitan Building. In 1928, Chick merged his businesses with those of Louis A. Merlo, D. Herbert Woollatt, and George Cross to form the Canada Paving and Supply Corporation. Thomas Chick was chairman of the new company and John D. Chick became one of its vice presidents.

== Politics ==
In 1925, Chick was elected president of the Conservative Association in the new federal riding of Essex West. He was the Conservative Party nominee in the riding of Windsor—Sandwich in the 1934 Ontario provincial election.

== Hockey ==
Chick raised money to construct the Windsor Arena and was one of ten Windsor businessmen who founded the Windsor Bulldogs of the Ontario Hockey Association. Following Herb Mitchell's resignation in 1933, Chick became the team's general manager.

In 1935, Chick was elected president of the International Hockey League. In 1936, the IHL and the Canadian–American Hockey League agreed to play an interlocking schedule due to a shortage of clubs in both leagues, but decided against a full merger. In 1938, the two leagues combined to form the American Hockey League. Can–Am president Maurice Podoloff was elected president of the new league and Chick was elected vice president.

During World War II, Chick worked with Canadian and American selective service authorities regarding the military commitments and border crossing privileges of players in the American Hockey League and National Hockey League, which helped keep both leagues alive during the war. In 1943, Chick was mentioned as a possible acting president of the NHL while Frank Calder was incapacitated by a heart ailment. Calder never recovered, but the league instead chose Red Dutton to serve as acting president following Calder's death.

Chick remained vice president of the AHL until 1954, when he was elevated to the presidency. He retired in 1957, but remained involved with the league as an advisor.

== Death ==
On April 13, 1961, Chick, who was a marine superintendent for National Sand and Material, was looking for one of the company's sand dredges on the Old Welland Canal during a rainstorm. He misjudged the distance to the end of a seawall, his car plunged into the water, and he drowned. His funeral was attended by a number of prominent hockey and political figures, including Paul Martin Sr., Clarence Campbell, Jack Adams, Punch Imlach, Harold Ballard, Jack Stewart, Jack Gordon, Herb Mitchell, and William Griesinger.
