= Karl Taylor (ice hockey) =

Canadian ice hockey coach

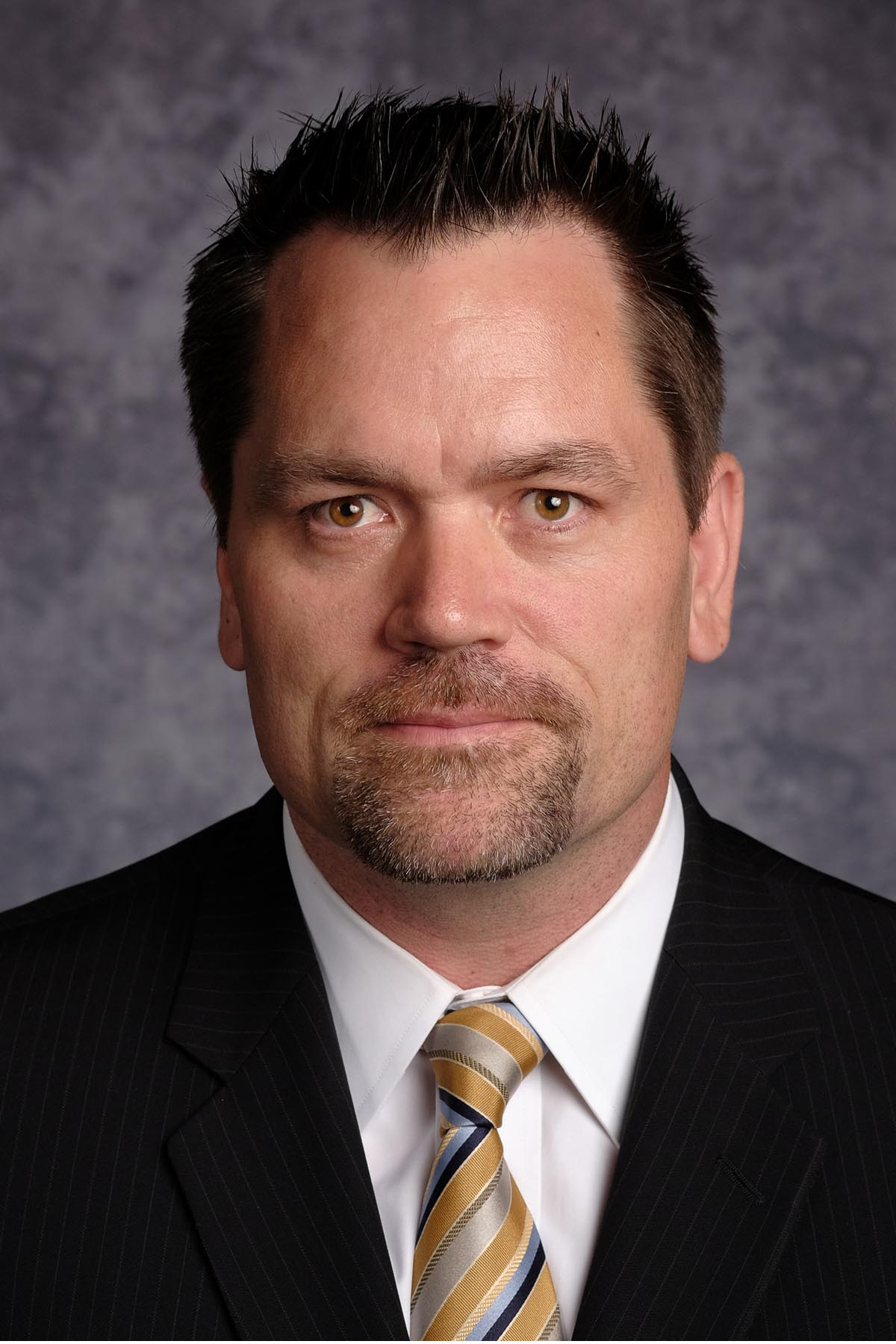
- Taylor in 2014
- Born: May 4, 1971 (age 55) North Bay, Ontario, Canada
- Height: 182.88 cm (6 ft 0 in)
- Weight: 92 kg (203 lb; 14 st 7 lb)
- Current AHL coach: Milwaukee Admirals
- Coached for: Texas Stars; Chicago Wolves Reading Royals
- Coaching career: 1997–present

Karl Taylor (born May 4, 1971) is a Canadian professional ice hockey head coach for the Milwaukee Admirals of the American Hockey League (AHL). He previously served as the head coach of the Chicago Wolves, Texas Stars, and Ontario Reign.

After concluding his major junior career in 1991, Taylor spent five years with the University of New Brunswick (UNB) men's ice hockey team. He then took a year off from hockey to complete his Master's degree before returning to UNB as an assistant coach in 1997. During his short tenure with the UNB Reds, Taylor helped lead them to the 1998 CIAU championships.

== Early life ==
Taylor was born on May 4, 1971, in North Bay, Ontario, Canada. As a teenager, Taylor moved to Barrie, Ontario in order to play with the Barrie Colts of the Southern Ontario Junior "B" Hockey League. Following his first season with the Colts, Taylor was drafted 15th overall by the Windsor Spitfires in the 1988 Ontario Hockey League (OHL) Midget Priority Draft. While with the Spitfires, Taylor was moved from his original position of left wing to defence. He scored eight goals and added 15 assists during the 1988–1989 season before being traded to the London Knights in January 1990. His tenure with the Knights was short-lived however, as he was traded to the North Bay Centennials in November 1990.

== Collegiate and assistant coaching career ==
Taylor concluded his major junior career in 1991 to play five years with the University of New Brunswick (UNB) men's ice hockey team. He then took a year off from hockey to complete his Master's degree before accepting an assistant coaching position with a Fredericton midget AAA team. Taylor spent one year with the team before returning to UNB as an assistant coach in 1997. During his short tenure with the UNB Reds, Taylor helped lead them to the 1998 CIAU championships. At UNB, Taylor was convinced by head coach Mike Johnson to join the National Coaching Institute (NCI) where he completed his master's degree in Sports Management.

Upon returning from the NCI, Taylor became a co-coach late in the season with the Calgary Flames midget AAA team along with Mark Howell. While attending a symposium, he was notified of an opening for a coaching position with the Red Deer College Kings ice hockey team. He eventually accepted the position in May 2000. Prior to his first season in this role, Taylor lost two defencemen and struggled to fill the lineup. He was eventually let go from the organization after three years as he failed to complete one the requirements of his probation.

== Professional coaching career ==
Upon leaving Red Deer College, Taylor was named head coach and director of hockey operations for the Reading Royals of the ECHL prior to the 2005–06 season. During his first season with the team, Taylor led them to a 42–23–7 regular-season record and was selected as the co-coach for the American Conference at the ECHL's 2006 All-Star game. This marked the organization's second 40-plus win season in team history and third consecutive playoff appearance. In his third season with the team, Taylor amassed a 112–82–22 total record as the Royals lost in the second round of the 2008 Kelly Cup playoffs to the eventual-champion Cincinnati Cyclones. He eventually left the Royals organization in 2008 once they landed an ECHL affiliation with the Los Angeles Kings and became the first head coach of the Ontario Reign. During their inaugural season, Taylor helped lead the team to a 7–4–1–1 record through their first 13 games. Their success continued through the 2008–09 season as he helped them capture the 2009 Pacific Division championship.

Taylor remained with the Reign until 2011 when he accepted an assistant coaching position with the Chicago Wolves of the American Hockey League (AHL). He spent the 2011–12 season with the Wolves, where he helped the club post a 42–27–7 record during the regular season to win the Midwest Division title. Following his first tenure in the AHL, Taylor spent one season as a scout for the Vancouver Canucks before joining the Portland Winterhawks organization in the Western Hockey League (WHL) as an assistant coach. As an assistant coach with the Winterhawks, Taylor helped lead them to a 54–13–5 record and advance to the 2014 WHL Championship Finals against the Edmonton Oil Kings. As such, he was recruited by the Dallas Stars organization to coach their AHL affiliate, the Texas Stars, during the 2014–15 season.

Taylor remained with the Stars organization for four years, amassing a 152–108–30–14 record as they made the playoffs in three of his four seasons. In his final season with the Stars organization, Taylor led the team to a 38–24–14 regular-season record as they met with the Toronto Marlies in the 2018 Calder Cup Finals. He eventually left the Stars to become head coach of Milwaukee Admirals, the AHL affiliate of the Nashville Predators. During the 2019–20 season, Taylor received the Louis A. R. Pieri Memorial Award as the league's most outstanding coach during the season. As a result of the NHL's COVID-19 protocol, Taylor was called up to the NHL as a replacement for the Predators' head coach in December 2021. He subsequently coached the Predators to a 5–2 win against the Colorado Avalanche on December 17, 2021.

== Personal life ==
Taylor and his wife, Bev, have two children together. They spend much of their offseason at a family farm in Saskatchewan.

== See also ==
- List of NHL head coaches
