= Stu Bickel =

American ice hockey player (born 1986)

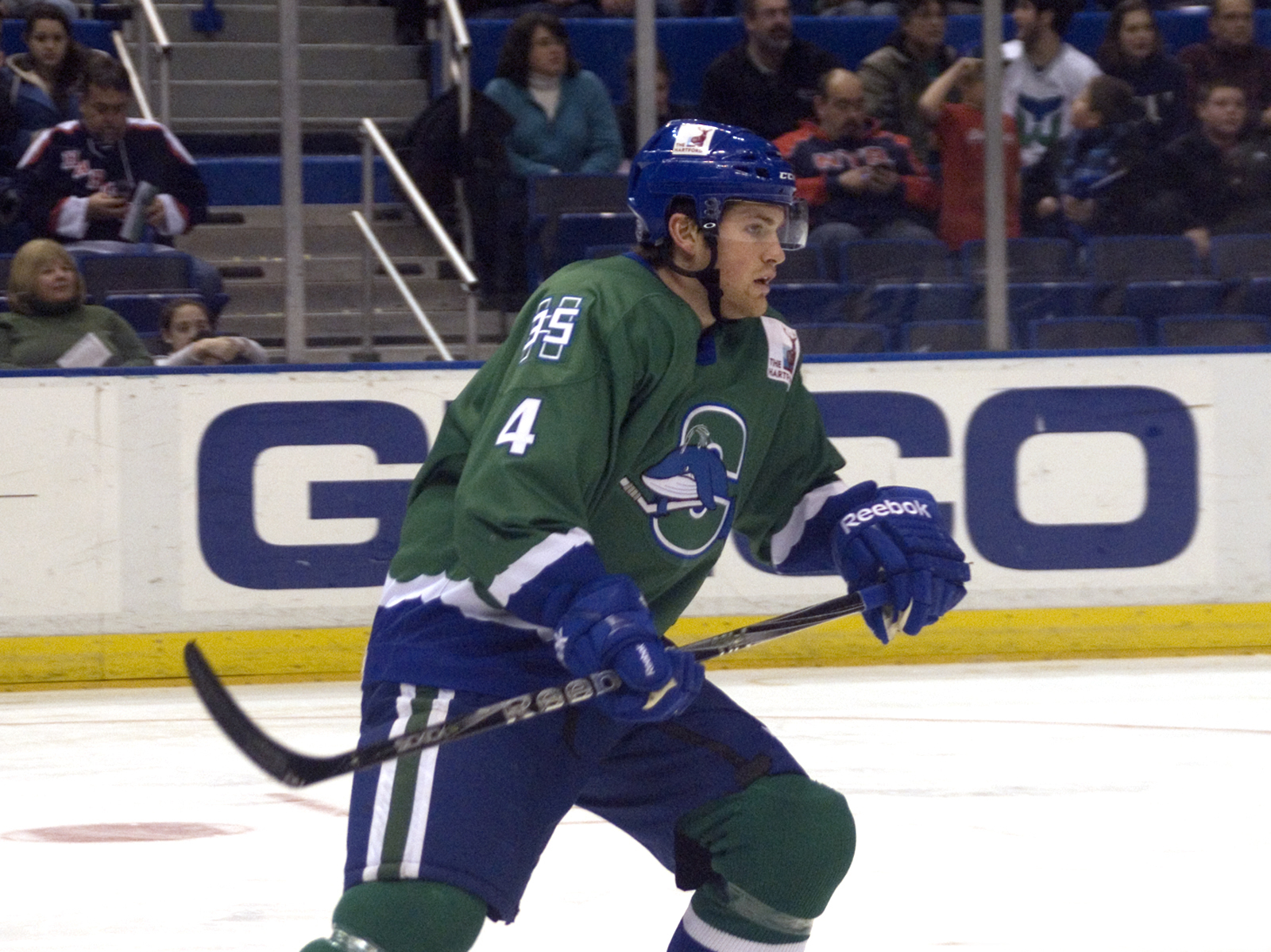
- Bickel with the Connecticut Whale in 2011
- Born: October 2, 1986 (age 40) Chanhassen, Minnesota, U.S.
- Height: 6 ft 4 in (193 cm)
- Weight: 207 lb (94 kg; 14 st 11 lb)
- Position: Defense/Right wing
- Shot: Right
- Played for: New York Rangers; Minnesota Wild; Iowa Chops (AHL); San Antonio Rampage (AHL); Syracuse Crunch (AHL); Hartford Wolf Pack (AHL); Connecticut Whale (AHL); Iowa Wild (AHL); San Diego Gulls (AHL)
- NHL draft: Undrafted
- Playing career: 2008–2018
- Coaching career

Current position
- Title: Head coach
- Team: Iowa Wild

Biographical details
- Education: University of Minnesota

Coaching career (HC unless noted)
- 2018–2020: Minnesota (assistant)
- 2020–2021: Minnesota Magicians
- 2021: St. Thomas (assistant)
- 2021–2022: Springfield Thunderbirds (assistant)
- 2022–2026: Coachella Valley Firebirds (assistant)
- 2026–: Iowa Wild

Stuart Richard Bickel (born October 2, 1986) is an American former professional ice hockey defenseman and current head coach of the American Hockey League’s Iowa Wild. He played in the National Hockey League (NHL) with the New York Rangers and Minnesota Wild.

== Playing career ==
On July 2, 2008, the Anaheim Ducks signed Bickel, an undrafted free agent, to a three-year contract. In the 2010–11 season, on November 23, 2010, the Ducks traded Bickel to the New York Rangers in exchange for fellow defenseman, Nigel Williams. After starting the 2011–12 season with the AHL Connecticut Whale, Bickel was called up to the Rangers on December 18, 2011. He made his NHL debut on December 20, 2011, in a game against the New Jersey Devils at the Prudential Center, recording an assist in the game for his first NHL point.

The Rangers re-signed Bickel to a two-year contract on July 1, 2012. He started the delayed 2012–13 season with the Rangers after the NHL lockout. Still, after 16 games, he was placed on waivers and assigned to their AHL affiliate, the Whale and Wolf Pack, for the remainder of his two-year contract.

On July 1, 2014, Bickel signed a one-year, two-way contract with the Minnesota Wild. Bickel was assigned initially to AHL affiliate, the Iowa Wild to begin the 2014–15 season, however, he made his return to the NHL for the first time since 2012, appearing in nine games with Minnesota with one assist.

As an unsigned free agent over the off-season, Bickel accepted an invitation to the St. Louis Blues training camp on a professional try-out. After he was unable to earn a contract with the Blues and their AHL affiliate, the Chicago Wolves, Bickel signed a professional try-out with the San Diego Gulls on October 9, 2015.

Bickel, in his tenth and final professional season, made four appearances with the San Diego Gulls in the 2017–18 AHL season.

== Coaching career ==
Having ended his professional career, for the 2018–19 season, Bickel accepted an assistant coaching role for the University of Minnesota hockey team. In 2020, Bickel left the U of M and became the head coach of the North American Hockey League's Minnesota Magicians, based out of Richfield, Minnesota, for the 2020–21 season. After one season with the Magicians, he initially joined the St. Thomas (Minnesota) Tommies men's ice hockey team as an assistant coach before joining the 2021–22 staff of the American Hockey League's Springfield Thunderbirds as an assistant coach. Bickel helped the Thunderbirds reach the Calder Cup Finals in his only season with the team.

Bickel was hired by the Seattle Kraken as an assistant coach with their new AHL affiliate, the expansion Coachella Valley Firebirds in 2022. With Bickel working alongside fellow assistant coach Jessica Campbell on head coach Dan Bylsma’s staff, the Firebirds reached the Calder Cup Finals in 2023 and 2024.

Following four seasons with Coachella Valley, Bickel was named head coach of the Iowa Wild on June 29, 2026.

== Career statistics ==
			Regular season					Playoffs
Season	Team	League	GP	G	A	Pts	PIM	GP	G	A	Pts	PIM
2004–05	Green Bay Gamblers	USHL	13	0	0	0	20	—	—	—	—	—
2005–06	Green Bay Gamblers	USHL	14	0	0	0	25	—	—	—	—	—
2005–06	Southern Minnesota Express	NAHL	38	8	12	20	115	13	1	4	5	36
2006–07	Sioux Falls Stampede	USHL	57	2	11	13	215	8	0	3	3	29
2007–08	University of Minnesota	WCHA	45	1	6	7	92	—	—	—	—	—
2008–09	Iowa Chops	AHL	21	0	1	1	51	—	—	—	—	—
2009–10	Bakersfield Condors	ECHL	24	1	12	13	50	9	0	2	2	14
2009–10	San Antonio Rampage	AHL	36	2	2	4	38	—	—	—	—	—
2010–11	Syracuse Crunch	AHL	6	0	3	3	14	—	—	—	—	—
2010–11	Elmira Jackals	ECHL	1	0	0	0	0	—	—	—	—	—
2010–11	Hartford Wolf Pack/CT Whale	AHL	54	2	7	9	135	6	0	1	1	6
2011–12	Connecticut Whale	AHL	27	1	3	4	80	—	—	—	—	—
2011–12	New York Rangers	NHL	51	0	9	9	108	18	0	0	0	16
2012–13	New York Rangers	NHL	16	0	0	0	49	—	—	—	—	—
2012–13	Connecticut Whale	AHL	10	0	1	1	18	—	—	—	—	—
2013–14	Hartford Wolf Pack	AHL	24	1	7	8	85	—	—	—	—	—
2014–15	Iowa Wild	AHL	43	3	8	11	93	—	—	—	—	—
2014–15	Minnesota Wild	NHL	9	0	1	1	46	—	—	—	—	—
2015–16	San Diego Gulls	AHL	59	1	6	7	210	6	0	0	0	6
2016–17	San Diego Gulls	AHL	26	2	4	6	148	3	0	1	1	2
2017–18	San Diego Gulls	AHL	4	0	0	0	47	—	—	—	—	—
AHL totals			310	12	42	54	919	15	0	2	2	14
NHL totals			76	0	10	10	203	18	0	0	0	16
