= Canada men's national ice hockey team =

Men's national ice hockey team representing Canada

Canada
- Nickname: Team Canada; (Équipe Canada)
- Association: Hockey Canada
- General manager: Kyle Dubas; Jason Spezza; Brad Treliving
- Head coach: Misha Donskov
- Assistants: Spencer Carbery; Ryan Huska; D. J. Smith
- Captain: Macklin Celebrini
- Most games: Brad Schlegel (304)
- Top scorer: Don MacLaren; Cliff Ronning (72)
- Most points: Fabian Joseph (163)
- Team colours: Red, black, white
- IIHF code: CAN
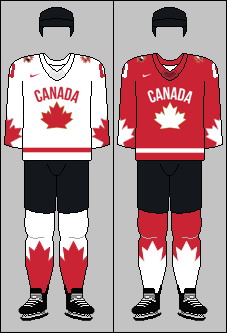

Ranking
- Current IIHF: 2 (3 June 2026)
- Highest IIHF: 1 (2003–2005, 2008, 2010, 2015–2021, 2023–2025)
- Lowest IIHF: 5 (2012–13)

First international
- Canada 8–1 Switzerland (Les Avants, Switzerland; January 10, 1910)

Biggest win
- Canada 47–0 Denmark (Stockholm, Sweden; February 12, 1949)

Biggest defeat
- Soviet Union 11–1 Canada (Vienna, Austria; April 24, 1977)

Olympics
- Appearances: 24 (first in 1920)
- Medals: Gold: 9 (1920, 1924, 1928, 1932, 1948, 1952, 2002, 2010, 2014); Silver: 5 (1936, 1960, 1992, 1994, 2026); Bronze: 3 (1956, 1968, 2018)

IIHF World Championships
- Appearances: 79 (first in 1920)
- Best result: (gold) Gold: 28 (1920, 1924, 1928, 1930, 1931, 1932, 1934, 1935, 1937, 1938, 1939, 1948, 1950, 1951, 1952, 1955, 1958, 1959, 1961, 1994, 1997, 2003, 2004, 2007, 2015, 2016, 2021, 2023)

Canada Cup / World Cup
- Appearances: 8 (first in 1976)
- Best result: Winner: 6 (1976, 1984, 1987, 1991, 2004, 2016)

International record (W–L–T)
- 1089–477–128

Medal record

Olympic Games
Gold medal – first place	1920 Antwerp	Team
Gold medal – first place	1924 Chamonix	Team
Gold medal – first place	1928 St. Moritz	Team
Gold medal – first place	1932 Lake Placid	Team
Gold medal – first place	1948 St. Moritz	Team
Gold medal – first place	1952 Oslo	Team
Gold medal – first place	2002 Salt Lake City	Team
Gold medal – first place	2010 Vancouver	Team
Gold medal – first place	2014 Sochi	Team
Silver medal – second place	1936 Garmisch-Partenkirchen	Team
Silver medal – second place	1960 Squaw Valley	Team
Silver medal – second place	1992 Albertville	Team
Silver medal – second place	1994 Lillehammer	Team
Silver medal – second place	2026 Milan Cortina	Team
Bronze medal – third place	1956 Cortina d'Ampezzo	Team
Bronze medal – third place	1968 Grenoble	Team
Bronze medal – third place	2018 Pyeongchang	Team

World Championships
Gold medal – first place	1920 Belgium	Team
Gold medal – first place	1924 France	Team
Gold medal – first place	1928 Switzerland	Team
Gold medal – first place	1930 Austria/France/Germany	
Gold medal – first place	1931 Poland	
Gold medal – first place	1932 United States	Team
Gold medal – first place	1934 Italy	
Gold medal – first place	1935 Switzerland	
Gold medal – first place	1937 Great Britain	
Gold medal – first place	1938 Czechoslovakia	
Gold medal – first place	1939 Switzerland	
Gold medal – first place	1948 Switzerland	Team
Gold medal – first place	1950 Great Britain	
Gold medal – first place	1951 France	
Gold medal – first place	1952 Norway	Team
Gold medal – first place	1955 West Germany	
Gold medal – first place	1958 Norway	
Gold medal – first place	1959 Czechoslovakia	
Gold medal – first place	1961 Switzerland	
Gold medal – first place	1994 Italy	
Gold medal – first place	1997 Finland	
Gold medal – first place	2003 Finland	
Gold medal – first place	2004 Czech Republic	
Gold medal – first place	2007 Russia	
Gold medal – first place	2015 Czech Republic	
Gold medal – first place	2016 Russia	
Gold medal – first place	2021 Latvia	
Gold medal – first place	2023 Finland/Latvia	
Silver medal – second place	1933 Czechoslovakia	
Silver medal – second place	1936 Germany	Team
Silver medal – second place	1949 Sweden	
Silver medal – second place	1954 Sweden	
Silver medal – second place	1960 United States	Team
Silver medal – second place	1962 United States	
Silver medal – second place	1985 Czechoslovakia	
Silver medal – second place	1989 Sweden	
Silver medal – second place	1991 Finland	
Silver medal – second place	1996 Austria	
Silver medal – second place	2005 Austria	
Silver medal – second place	2008 Canada	
Silver medal – second place	2009 Switzerland	
Silver medal – second place	2017 Germany/France	
Silver medal – second place	2019 Slovakia	
Silver medal – second place	2022 Finland	
Bronze medal – third place	1956 Italy	Team
Bronze medal – third place	1966 Yugoslavia	
Bronze medal – third place	1967 Austria	
Bronze medal – third place	1968 France	Team
Bronze medal – third place	1978 Czechoslovakia	
Bronze medal – third place	1982 Finland	
Bronze medal – third place	1983 West Germany	
Bronze medal – third place	1986 Soviet Union	
Bronze medal – third place	1995 Sweden	

Canada Cup / World Cup
Gold medal – first place	1976 Toronto/Montreal	
Gold medal – first place	1984 Calgary/Edmonton	
Gold medal – first place	1987 Montreal/Hamilton	
Gold medal – first place	1991 Montreal/Hamilton	
Gold medal – first place	2004 Toronto	
Gold medal – first place	2016 Toronto	

4 Nations Face-Off
Gold medal – first place	2025 Boston	

Winter Universiade
Gold medal – first place	1981 Jaca	Team
Gold medal – first place	1991 Sapporo	Team
Gold medal – first place	2007 Turin	Team
Gold medal – first place	2013 Trentino	Team
Gold medal – first place	2023 Lake Placid	Team
Silver medal – second place	1972 Lake Placid	Team
Silver medal – second place	2001 Zakopane	Team
Silver medal – second place	2009 Harbin	Team
Bronze medal – third place	1968 Innsbruck	Team
Bronze medal – third place	1987 Štrbské Pleso	Team
Bronze medal – third place	1997 Muju-Jeonju	Team
Bronze medal – third place	1999 Poprad-Tatry	Team
Bronze medal – third place	2003 Tarvisio	Team
Bronze medal – third place	2011 Erzurum	Team
Bronze medal – third place	2015 Granada-Štrbské Pleso	Team
Bronze medal – third place	2017 Almaty	Team
Bronze medal – third place	2019 Krasnoyarsk	Team

The Canada men's national ice hockey team (popularly known as Team Canada; French: Équipe Canada) is the ice hockey team representing Canada internationally. The team is overseen by Hockey Canada, a member of the International Ice Hockey Federation. From 1920 until 1963, Canada's international representation was by senior amateur club teams. Canada's national men's team was founded in 1963 by David Bauer as a part of the Canadian Amateur Hockey Association, playing out of the University of British Columbia. The nickname "Team Canada" was first used for the 1972 Summit Series and has been frequently used to refer to both the Canadian national men's and women's teams ever since.

Canada is the most successful national ice hockey team in international play, having won the 1972 Summit Series against the Soviet Union, a record four Canada Cups dating back to 1976, a record two World Cups of Hockey, a record nine Olympic gold medals, and a record 28 World Championship titles.

Canada is one of the most successful national ice hockey teams in the world and a member of the so-called "Big Six", the unofficial group of the six strongest men's ice hockey nations, along with Russia, the United States, Sweden, Finland, and the Czech Republic.

== History ==
Hockey is Canada's national winter sport, and Canadians are extremely passionate about the game. Canada was first represented internationally at the 1910 European Championships by the Oxford Canadians, a team of Canadians from the University of Oxford. They represented Canada again at the 1912 World Championships.

From 1920 until 1963, the senior amateur club teams representing Canada, were usually the most recent Allan Cup champions. The last amateur club team from Canada to win a gold medal at the World Championship was the Trail Smoke Eaters in 1961. The responsibility of choosing which team represented Canada belonged to Canadian Amateur Hockey Association (CAHA) secretary-manager; George Dudley from 1947 to 1960, and Gordon Juckes from 1960 to 1963.

Following the 1963 World Championships, Father David Bauer founded the national team as a permanent institution. The new permanent national team first competed in ice hockey at the 1964 Winter Olympics. His philosophy was to simply win the games against the weaker countries instead of running up the score. Canada, Czechoslovakia and Sweden finished with identical records of five wins and two losses. Canada thought they had won the bronze medal based on the goal differential in the three games among the tied countries. When they attended the presentation of the Olympic medals, they were disappointed to learn they had finished in fourth place based on goal differential of all seven games played. The players and CAHA president Art Potter accused that International Ice Hockey Federation (IIHF) president Bunny Ahearne, made a last-minute decision to change the rules and take away a medal from Canada. Marshall Johnston summarized the team's feeling that, "The shepherd and his flock had been fleeced".

In 1967, the Canada men's national team was divided into western and eastern branches. Jack Bownass coached the eastern team, which played in the Quebec Senior Hockey League with Derek Holmes as its captain, to prepare for the 1968 Winter Olympics.

Before the Soviet Union began international competition in 1954, Canada dominated international hockey, winning six out of seven golds at the Olympics and 10 World Championship gold medals. Canada then went 50 years without winning the Winter Olympic gold medal, and from 1962 to 1993, did not win any World Championships. This was in part because Canada's best professional players were unable to attend these events as they had commitments with their National Hockey League teams.

Canada was awarded hosting duties of the 1970 Ice Hockey World Championships with the limited use of former professionals. The IIHF later reversed the permission after International Olympic Committee president Avery Brundage objected to professionals at an amateur event. CAHA president Earl Dawson withdrew the national team from international competitions against European hockey teams until Canada was allowed to use its best players.

While boycotting the IIHF, other international competitions were held such as the 1972 Canada–USSR Summit Series and in 1976 the inaugural Canada Cup invitational. Canada returned to the IIHF in 1977 after a series of negotiations between IIHF President Günther Sabetzki and top Canadian and American professional ice hockey officials. As a result, professionals are allowed to compete at the World Championship which was scheduled later in the year to ensure more players are available from among the NHL teams eliminated from the Stanley Cup playoffs. In return, a competition for the Canada Cup was to be played every four years on North American territory with the participation of Canada, the United States, and the four strongest European national teams, including professionals.

In 1983, Hockey Canada began the "Program of Excellence", whose purpose was to prepare a team for the Winter Olympics every four years. This new National Team played a full season together all over the world against both national and club teams, and often attracted top NHL prospects. In 1986, the International Olympic Committee voted to allow professional athletes to compete in Olympic Games, starting in 1988. Veteran pros with NHL experience and, in a few cases, current NHLers who were holding out in contract disputes joined the team. This program was discontinued in 1998, when the NHL began shutting down to allow its players to compete.

After not winning a gold medal for 33 years, Canada won the 1994 World Championship in Italy. Since that time, they have won in 1997, 2003, 2004, 2007, 2015, 2016, 2021 and 2023. Canada captured its first Olympic gold medal in 50 years at Salt Lake City 2002. At Vancouver 2010, Canada won the gold medal with a 3–2 win against the United States in the final. Sidney Crosby's overtime goal secured Canada the final gold medal awarded at the Games. At the 2012 World Championship in Finland and Sweden, Ryan Murray became the first draft eligible prospect to represent Canada at the Ice Hockey World Championship.

Canada successfully defended gold at Sochi 2014, becoming the first men's team to do so since the Soviet Union in 1988, the first to finish the tournament undefeated since 1984 and the first to do both with a full NHL participation. Their relentless offensive pressure and stifling defence has earned the 2014 squad praise as perhaps the best, most complete Team Canada ever assembled. Drew Doughty and Shea Weber led the team in scoring, while Jonathan Toews scored the gold medal-winning goal in the first period of a 3–0 win over Sweden in the final. The architect behind the 2010 and 2014 teams, Steve Yzerman, immediately stepped down as general manager following the win.

Led by general manager Jim Nill, head coach Todd McLellan, and the late addition of captain Sidney Crosby, Canada won the 2015 IIHF World Championship in dominating fashion over Russia, their first win at the Worlds since 2007. By winning all 10 of their games in regulation, Hockey Canada was awarded a 1 million Swiss franc bonus prize in the first year of its existence. Canada scored 66 goals in their 10 games and had the top three scorers of the tournament: Jason Spezza, Jordan Eberle and Taylor Hall. Tyler Seguin also led the championship with nine goals. The win secured Canada's return to number one on the IIHF world rankings for the first time since 2010.

At the 2021 IIHF World Championship, following a cancelled 2020 tournament due to the COVID-19 pandemic, Canada returned to the competition with a roster weaker than most years, featuring rare inclusions of draft prospects and other non-NHL prospects. The team lost three games in regulation to start the tournament, the first Canadian team in Worlds history to do so, and needed 10 points over the final four round robin games to make the playoff round. Winning the tiebreaker over Kazakhstan, Canada qualified for the playoff round as the lowest seed and managed wins over Russia and the United States before playing Finland for a rematch of the 2019 final in the gold medal game. Nick Paul's goal won the game for Canada in overtime, despite the Finns having either led or been tied the entire game, capping off a most unlikely Canadian IIHF men's gold.

=== List of teams representing Canada from 1920 to 1963 ===
Event	Team	Hometown
1920 Summer Olympics	Winnipeg Falcons	Winnipeg, Manitoba
1924 Winter Olympics	Toronto Granites	Toronto, Ontario
1928 Winter Olympics	University of Toronto	Toronto, Ontario
1930 World Championships	Toronto CCMs	Toronto, Ontario
1931 World Championships	University of Manitoba	Winnipeg, Manitoba
1932 Winter Olympics	Winnipeg Hockey Club	Winnipeg, Manitoba
1933 World Championships	Toronto National Sea Fleas	Toronto, Ontario
1934 World Championships	Saskatoon Quakers	Saskatoon, Saskatchewan
1935 World Championships	Winnipeg Monarchs	Winnipeg, Manitoba
1936 Winter Olympics	Port Arthur Bearcats	Port Arthur, Ontario
1937 World Championships	Kimberley Dynamiters	Kimberley, British Columbia
1938 World Championships	Sudbury Wolves	Sudbury, Ontario
1939 World Championships	Trail Smoke Eaters	Trail, British Columbia
World Championships not held from 1940 to 1946 due to World War II.
1947 World Championships	did not participate	
1948 Winter Olympics	Ottawa RCAF Flyers	CFB Ottawa, Ontario
1949 World Championships	Sudbury Wolves	Sudbury, Ontario
1950 World Championships	Edmonton Mercurys	Edmonton, Alberta
1951 World Championships	Lethbridge Maple Leafs	Lethbridge, Alberta
1952 Winter Olympics	Edmonton Mercurys	Edmonton, Alberta
1953 World Championships	did not participate	
1954 World Championships	East York Lyndhursts	East York, Ontario
1955 World Championships	Penticton Vees	Penticton, British Columbia
1956 Winter Olympics	Kitchener-Waterloo Dutchmen	Kitchener–Waterloo, Ontario
1957 World Championships	did not participate	
1958 World Championships	Whitby Dunlops	Whitby, Ontario
1959 World Championships	Belleville McFarlands	Belleville, Ontario
1960 Winter Olympics	Kitchener-Waterloo Dutchmen	Kitchener–Waterloo, Ontario
1961 World Championships	Trail Smoke Eaters	Trail, British Columbia
1962 World Championships	Galt Terriers	Galt, Ontario
1963 World Championships	Trail Smoke Eaters	Trail, British Columbia

== Competition achievements ==
=== Olympic Games ===
All Olympic ice hockey tournaments between 1920 and 1968 also counted as World Championships.

Games	Representative	GP	W	L	T	GF	GA	Coach	Manager/GM	Captain	Finish	Ref.
1920 Antwerp	Winnipeg Falcons	3	3	0	0	21	1	Gordon Sigurjonsson	H. A. Axford	Frank Fredrickson	Gold	
1924 Chamonix	Toronto Granites	5	5	0	0	110	3	Frank Rankin	William Hewitt	Dunc Munro	Gold	
1928 St. Moritz	University of Toronto Grads	3	3	0	0	38	0	Conn Smythe	William Hewitt	John Porter	Gold	
1932 Lake Placid	Winnipeg Hockey Club	6	5	0	1	32	4	Jack Hughes	Lou Marsh	William Cockburn	Gold	
1936 Garmisch- Partenkirchen	Port Arthur Bearcats	8	7	1	0	54	7	Al Pudas	Malcolm Cochrane	Herman Murray	Silver	
1948 St. Moritz	Ottawa RCAF Flyers	8	7	0	1	69	5	Frank Boucher	Sandy Watson	George Mara	Gold	
1952 Oslo	Edmonton Mercurys	8	7	0	1	71	14	Lou Holmes	Jim Christianson	Billy Dawe	Gold	
1956 Cortina d'Ampezzo	Kitchener-Waterloo Dutchmen	8	6	2	0	53	12	Bobby Bauer	Ernie Goman	Jack McKenzie	Bronze	
1960 Squaw Valley	Kitchener-Waterloo Dutchmen	7	6	1	0	55	15	Bobby Bauer	Ernie Goman	Harry Sinden	Silver	
1964 Innsbruck	National team program	7	5	2	0	32	17	David Bauer	Bob Hindmarch	Hank Akervall	4th	
1968 Grenoble	National team program	7	5	2	0	28	15	Jackie McLeod	David Bauer	Marshall Johnston	Bronze	
1972 Sapporo	did not participate											
1976 Innsbruck	did not participate											
1980 Lake Placid	National team program	6	3	3	0	29	18	Clare Drake	Rick Noonan	Randy Gregg	6th	
1984 Sarajevo	National team program	7	4	3	0	24	16	Dave King		Dave Tippett	4th	
1988 Calgary	National team program	8	5	2	1	31	21	Dave King		Trent Yawney	4th	
1992 Albertville	National team program	8	6	2	0	37	17	Dave King		Brad Schlegel	Silver	
1994 Lillehammer	National team program	8	5	2	1	27	19	Tom Renney	George Kingston	Fabian Joseph	Silver	
1998 Nagano		6	4	2	0	19	8	Marc Crawford	Bobby Clarke	Eric Lindros	4th	
2002 Salt Lake City		6	4	1	1	22	14	Pat Quinn	Wayne Gretzky	Mario Lemieux	Gold	
2006 Turin		6	3	3	0	15	11	Pat Quinn	Wayne Gretzky	Joe Sakic	7th	
2010 Vancouver		7	6	1	—	32	14	Mike Babcock	Steve Yzerman	Scott Niedermayer	Gold	
2014 Sochi		6	6	0	—	17	3	Mike Babcock	Steve Yzerman	Sidney Crosby	Gold	
2018 Pyeongchang	National team program	6	4	2	—	21	12	Willie Desjardins	Sean Burke	Chris Kelly	Bronze	
2022 Beijing	National team program	5	3	2	—	19	9	Claude Julien	Shane Doan	Eric Staal	6th	
2026 Milan / Cortina d'Ampezzo		6	5	1	—	28	10	Jon Cooper	Doug Armstrong	Sidney Crosby (Note: Replaced by Connor McDavid after Crosby was unable to play in the semi-finals and gold medal game due to injury.)	Silver	

=== World Championships ===
All Olympic ice hockey tournaments between 1920 and 1968 also counted as World Championships. World Championships were not held from 1940 to 1946 during World War II and during the Winter Olympic years of 1980, 1984 or 1988. The 2020 tournament was cancelled due to the COVID-19 pandemic.

Year	Location	Result
1920	Antwerp, Belgium	Gold
1924	Chamonix, France	Gold
1928	St. Moritz, Switzerland	Gold
1930	Chamonix, France / Berlin, Germany / Vienna, Austria	Gold
1931	Krynica, Poland	Gold
1932	Lake Placid, New York, United States	Gold
1933	Prague, Czechoslovakia	Silver
1934	Milan, Italy	Gold
1935	Davos, Switzerland	Gold
1936	Garmisch-Partenkirchen, Germany	Silver
1937	London, United Kingdom	Gold
1938	Prague, Czechoslovakia	Gold
1939	Zürich / Basel, Switzerland	Gold
World Championships not held from 1940 to 1946 due to World War II.
Canada did not participate in 1947.
1948	St. Moritz, Switzerland	Gold
1949	Stockholm, Sweden	Silver
1950	London, United Kingdom	Gold
1951	Paris, France	Gold
1952	Oslo, Norway	Gold
Canada did not participate in 1953.
1954	Stockholm, Sweden	Silver
1955	Krefeld / Dortmund / Cologne, West Germany	Gold
1956	Cortina d'Ampezzo, Italy	Bronze
Canada did not participate in 1957.
1958	Oslo, Norway	Gold
1959	Prague / Bratislava, Czechoslovakia	Gold
1960	Squaw Valley, California, United States	Silver
1961	Geneva / Lausanne, Switzerland	Gold
1962	Colorado Springs / Denver, Colorado, United States	Silver
1963	Stockholm, Sweden	4th place
1964	Innsbruck, Austria	4th place
1965	Tampere, Finland	4th place
1966	Ljubljana, Yugoslavia	Bronze
1967	Vienna, Austria	Bronze
1968	Grenoble, France	Bronze
1969	Stockholm, Sweden	4th place
Canada did not participate in IIHF events from 1970 to 1976.
1977	Vienna, Austria	4th place
1978	Prague, Czechoslovakia	Bronze
1979	Moscow, Russian SFSR, Soviet Union	4th place
1981	Gothenburg / Stockholm, Sweden	4th place
1982	Helsinki / Tampere, Finland	Bronze
1983	Düsseldorf / Dortmund / Munich, West Germany	Bronze
1985	Prague, Czechoslovakia	Silver
1986	Moscow, Russian SFSR, Soviet Union	Bronze
1987	Vienna, Austria	4th place
1989	Stockholm / Södertälje, Sweden	Silver
1990	Bern / Fribourg, Switzerland	4th place
1991	Turku / Helsinki / Tampere, Finland	Silver
1992	Prague / Bratislava, Czechoslovakia	8th place
1993	Dortmund / Munich, Germany	4th place
1994	Bolzano / Canazei / Milan, Italy	Gold
1995	Stockholm / Gävle, Sweden	Bronze
1996	Vienna, Austria	Silver
1997	Helsinki / Turku / Tampere, Finland	Gold
1998	Zürich / Basel, Switzerland	6th place
1999	Oslo / Lillehammer / Hamar, Norway	4th place
2000	Saint Petersburg, Russia	4th place
2001	Cologne / Hanover / Nuremberg, Germany	5th place
2002	Gothenburg / Karlstad / Jönköping, Sweden	6th place
2003	Helsinki / Tampere / Turku, Finland	Gold
2004	Prague / Ostrava, Czech Republic	Gold
2005	Innsbruck / Vienna, Austria	Silver
2006	Riga, Latvia	4th place
2007	Moscow / Mytishchi, Russia	Gold
2008	Quebec City / Halifax, Quebec, Canada	Silver
2009	Bern / Kloten, Switzerland	Silver
2010	Cologne / Mannheim / Gelsenkirchen, Germany	7th place
2011	Bratislava / Košice, Slovakia	5th place
2012	Helsinki, Finland / Stockholm, Sweden	5th place
2013	Stockholm, Sweden / Helsinki, Finland	5th place
2014	Minsk, Belarus	5th place
2015	Prague / Ostrava, Czech Republic	Gold
2016	Moscow / Saint Petersburg, Russia	Gold
2017	Cologne, Germany / Paris, France	Silver
2018	Copenhagen / Herning, Denmark	4th place
2019	Bratislava / Košice, Slovakia	Silver
2021	Riga, Latvia	Gold
2022	Tampere / Helsinki, Finland	Silver
2023	Tampere, Finland / Riga, Latvia	Gold
2024	Prague / Ostrava, Czech Republic	4th place
2025	Stockholm, Sweden / Herning, Denmark	5th place
2026	Zürich / Fribourg, Switzerland	4th place

=== Canada Cup / World Cup of Hockey ===
Year	Record				Head coach	Result
Year	GP	W	L	T	Head coach	Result
1976 Canada Cup	7	6	1	0	Scotty Bowman	Champions
1981 Canada Cup	7	5	1	1	Scotty Bowman	Runner-up
1984 Canada Cup	8	5	2	1	Glen Sather	Champions
1987 Canada Cup	9	6	1	2	Mike Keenan	Champions
1991 Canada Cup	8	6	0	2	Mike Keenan	Champions
1996 World Cup	8	5	3	0	Glen Sather	Runner-up
2004 World Cup	6	6	0	0	Pat Quinn	Champions
2016 World Cup	6	6	0	0	Mike Babcock	Champions
2028 World Cup						

=== NHL 4 Nations Face-Off ===
- 2025 – Winners

=== Summit Series ===
- 1972 – Winners
- 1974 – Runners-up

On the 40th anniversary of the 1972 Summit Series, the IIHF Milestone Award was given to the Canadian and Russian teams for the event which had a "decisive influence on the development of the game". Reuters wrote that Canada was expected to win the series easily, but when they came from behind to win in the eighth and final game, it marked "the beginning of the modern hockey era".

=== Spengler Cup ===
In the Spengler Cup, Team Canada competes against European club teams, such as HC Davos who host the tournament every year in Eisstadion Davos. Canada used to be represented by the standing national team at this event, but is now usually made up of Canadians playing in European leagues or the American Hockey League. In 2019, Team Canada won its 16th Spengler Cup, passing the host team HC Davos for the most titles. HC Davos is now tied for most wins after winning in 2023.

Results	Years
Winners	1984, 1986, 1987, 1992, 1995, 1996, 1997, 1998, 2002, 2003, 2007, 2012, 2015, 2016, 2017, 2019
Runners-up	1985, 1988, 1990, 2000, 2001, 2005, 2006, 2008, 2010, 2018
Third place	1989, 1991, 1994, 1999, 2004, 2009

== Medals won in senior-team competitions ==
As of February 22, 2026

Competition	Gold	Silver	Bronze
Olympic Games	9	5	3
IIHF World Championships	28	16	9
Canada Cup / World Cup of Hockey	6	–	–
4 Nations Face-Off	1	–	–
Total	38 (Note: 6 gold medals were won at Olympic Games that also counted as IIHF World Championship titles)	19 (Note: 2 silver medals were won at Olympic Games that also counted as IIHF World Championship titles)	10 (Note: 2 bronze medals were won at Olympic Games that also counted as IIHF World Championship titles)

== Team ==
=== Current roster ===
Roster for the 2026 IIHF World Championship.

Head Coach: Misha Donskov

No.	Pos.	Name	Height	Weight	Birthdate	Team
2	D	Dylan DeMelo	1.85 m (6 ft 1 in)	88 kg (194 lb)	1 May 1993 (age 33)	(Canada) Winnipeg Jets
5	D	Denton Mateychuk	1.80 m (5 ft 11 in)	87 kg (192 lb)	12 July 2004 (age 22)	(United States) Columbus Blue Jackets
6	D	Sam Dickinson	1.90 m (6 ft 3 in)	95 kg (209 lb)	7 June 2006 (age 20)	(United States) San Jose Sharks
13	F	Gabriel Vilardi	1.91 m (6 ft 3 in)	91 kg (201 lb)	16 August 1999 (age 27)	(Canada) Winnipeg Jets
16	F	Connor Brown	1.83 m (6 ft 0 in)	84 kg (185 lb)	14 January 1994 (age 32)	(United States) New Jersey Devils
18	F	Robert Thomas	1.83 m (6 ft 0 in)	99 kg (218 lb)	2 July 1999 (age 27)	(United States) St. Louis Blues
19	F	Dawson Mercer	1.83 m (6 ft 0 in)	83 kg (183 lb)	27 October 2001 (age 25)	(United States) New Jersey Devils
22	D	Evan Bouchard	1.91 m (6 ft 3 in)	87 kg (192 lb)	20 October 1999 (age 27)	(Canada) Edmonton Oilers
24	F	Dylan Cozens	1.91 m (6 ft 3 in)	85 kg (187 lb)	9 February 2001 (age 25)	(Canada) Ottawa Senators
25	D	Darnell Nurse	1.93 m (6 ft 4 in)	100 kg (220 lb)	4 February 1995 (age 31)	(Canada) Edmonton Oilers
28	D	Zach Whitecloud	1.88 m (6 ft 2 in)	99 kg (218 lb)	28 November 1996 (age 29)	(Canada) Calgary Flames
29	D	Parker Wotherspoon	1.85 m (6 ft 1 in)	88 kg (194 lb)	24 August 1997 (age 29)	(United States) Pittsburgh Penguins
33	G	Cam Talbot	1.90 m (6 ft 3 in)	82 kg (181 lb)	5 July 1987 (age 39)	(United States) Detroit Red Wings
44	D	Morgan Rielly	1.85 m (6 ft 1 in)	99 kg (218 lb)	9 March 1994 (age 32)	(Canada) Toronto Maple Leafs
55	F	Mark Scheifele	1.90 m (6 ft 3 in)	94 kg (207 lb)	15 March 1993 (age 33)	(Canada) Winnipeg Jets
58	F	Emmitt Finnie	1.85 m (6 ft 1 in)	88 kg (194 lb)	27 June 2005 (age 21)	(United States) Detroit Red Wings
71	F	Macklin Celebrini – C	1.83 m (6 ft 0 in)	86 kg (190 lb)	13 June 2006 (age 20)	(United States) San Jose Sharks
72	G	Jack Ivankovic	1.83 m (6 ft 0 in)	81 kg (179 lb)	22 May 2007 (age 19)	(United States) Michigan Wolverines
73	G	Jet Greaves	1.83 m (6 ft 0 in)	85 kg (187 lb)	30 March 2001 (age 25)	(United States) Columbus Blue Jackets
81	F	Dylan Holloway	1.85 m (6 ft 1 in)	91 kg (201 lb)	23 September 2001 (age 25)	(United States) St. Louis Blues
87	F	Sidney Crosby – A	1.80 m (5 ft 11 in)	85 kg (187 lb)	7 August 1987 (age 39)	(United States) Pittsburgh Penguins
90	F	Ryan O'Reilly – A	1.85 m (6 ft 1 in)	98 kg (216 lb)	7 February 1991 (age 35)	(United States) Nashville Predators
91	F	John Tavares – A	1.85 m (6 ft 1 in)	98 kg (216 lb)	20 September 1990 (age 36)	(Canada) Toronto Maple Leafs
93	F	Fraser Minten	1.88 m (6 ft 2 in)	87 kg (192 lb)	5 July 2004 (age 22)	(United States) Boston Bruins
94	F	Porter Martone	1.91 m (6 ft 3 in)	95 kg (209 lb)	26 October 2006 (age 20)	(United States) Philadelphia Flyers

=== 2026 Olympics roster ===
The first six players of Canada's roster were announced on June 16, 2025. The remainder of the team was named on December 31, 2025. On February 3, 2026, Anthony Cirelli was ruled out due to injury, with Sam Bennett named as his replacement. On February 5, Brayden Point was also ruled out and replaced by Seth Jarvis. On February 8, 2026, Canada named Sidney Crosby as team captain, with Connor McDavid and Cale Makar serving as alternate captains. Following an injury to Crosby in Canada's quarterfinal game against Czechia, McDavid served as captain for their semifinal game against Finland and the gold medal game against the United States, with Nathan MacKinnon serving as an additional alternate captain for both games.

Head coach: Jon Cooper

No.	Pos.	Name	Height	Weight	Birthdate	Team
6	D	Travis Sanheim	1.93 m (6 ft 4 in)	101 kg (223 lb)	29 March 1996 (aged 29)	(United States) Philadelphia Flyers
7	D	Devon Toews	1.85 m (6 ft 1 in)	87 kg (192 lb)	21 February 1994 (aged 31)	(United States) Colorado Avalanche
8	D	Cale Makar – A	1.83 m (6 ft 0 in)	85 kg (187 lb)	30 October 1998 (aged 27)	(United States) Colorado Avalanche
9	F	Sam Bennett	1.85 m (6 ft 1 in)	88 kg (194 lb)	20 June 1996 (aged 29)	(United States) Florida Panthers
10	F	Nick Suzuki	1.80 m (5 ft 11 in)	94 kg (207 lb)	10 August 1999 (aged 26)	(Canada) Montreal Canadiens
13	F	Sam Reinhart	1.85 m (6 ft 1 in)	89 kg (196 lb)	6 November 1995 (aged 30)	(United States) Florida Panthers
14	F	Bo Horvat	1.85 m (6 ft 1 in)	98 kg (216 lb)	5 April 1995 (aged 30)	(United States) New York Islanders
17	F	Macklin Celebrini	1.83 m (6 ft 0 in)	86 kg (190 lb)	13 June 2006 (aged 19)	(United States) San Jose Sharks
20	D	Thomas Harley	1.91 m (6 ft 3 in)	96 kg (212 lb)	19 August 2001 (aged 24)	(United States) Dallas Stars
24	F	Seth Jarvis	1.78 m (5 ft 10 in)	82 kg (181 lb)	1 February 2002 (aged 24)	(United States) Carolina Hurricanes
27	D	Shea Theodore	1.88 m (6 ft 2 in)	90 kg (198 lb)	3 August 1995 (aged 30)	(United States) Vegas Golden Knights
29	F	Nathan MacKinnon – A	1.83 m (6 ft 0 in)	91 kg (201 lb)	1 September 1995 (aged 30)	(United States) Colorado Avalanche
35	G	Darcy Kuemper	1.96 m (6 ft 5 in)	97 kg (214 lb)	5 May 1990 (aged 35)	(United States) Los Angeles Kings
38	F	Brandon Hagel	1.88 m (6 ft 2 in)	82 kg (181 lb)	27 August 1998 (aged 27)	(United States) Tampa Bay Lightning
43	F	Tom Wilson	1.93 m (6 ft 4 in)	103 kg (227 lb)	29 March 1994 (aged 31)	(United States) Washington Capitals
44	D	Josh Morrissey	1.83 m (6 ft 0 in)	89 kg (196 lb)	28 March 1995 (aged 30)	(Canada) Winnipeg Jets
48	G	Logan Thompson	1.93 m (6 ft 4 in)	94 kg (207 lb)	25 February 1997 (aged 28)	(United States) Washington Capitals
50	G	Jordan Binnington	1.88 m (6 ft 2 in)	78 kg (172 lb)	11 July 1993 (aged 32)	(United States) St. Louis Blues
55	D	Colton Parayko	1.98 m (6 ft 6 in)	104 kg (229 lb)	12 May 1993 (aged 32)	(United States) St. Louis Blues
61	F	Mark Stone	1.93 m (6 ft 4 in)	95 kg (209 lb)	13 May 1992 (aged 33)	(United States) Vegas Golden Knights
63	F	Brad Marchand	1.75 m (5 ft 9 in)	80 kg (176 lb)	11 May 1988 (aged 37)	(United States) Florida Panthers
87	F	Sidney Crosby – C	1.80 m (5 ft 11 in)	91 kg (201 lb)	7 August 1987 (aged 38)	(United States) Pittsburgh Penguins
89	D	Drew Doughty	1.85 m (6 ft 1 in)	95 kg (209 lb)	8 December 1989 (aged 36)	(United States) Los Angeles Kings
93	F	Mitch Marner	1.83 m (6 ft 0 in)	82 kg (181 lb)	5 May 1997 (aged 28)	(United States) Vegas Golden Knights
97	F	Connor McDavid – A / C	1.85 m (6 ft 1 in)	88 kg (194 lb)	13 January 1997 (aged 29)	(Canada) Edmonton Oilers

=== Coaches ===
List of coaches of the Canada men's national ice hockey team.

Olympics

1. Gordon Sigurjonsson, 1920
2. Frank Rankin, 1924
3. Conn Smythe, 1928
4. Jack Hughes, 1932
5. Al Pudas, 1936
6. Sgt. Frank Boucher, 1948
7. Louis Holmes, 1952
8. Bobby Bauer, 1956, 1960
9. Father David Bauer, 1964
10. Jackie McLeod, 1968
11. Clare Drake, 1980
12. Dave King, 1984, 1988, 1992
13. Tom Renney, 1994
14. Marc Crawford, 1998
15. Pat Quinn, 2002, 2006
16. Mike Babcock, 2010, 2014
17. Willie Desjardins, 2018
18. Claude Julien, 2022
19. Jon Cooper, 2026

Summit Series, Canada Cup, World Cup, 4 Nations Face-off

1. Harry Sinden, 1972 Summit Series
2. Bill Harris, 1974 Summit Series
3. Scotty Bowman, 1976, 1981 Canada Cups
4. Glen Sather, 1984 Canada Cup, 1996 World Cup
5. Mike Keenan, 1987, 1991 Canada Cups
6. Pat Quinn, 2004 World Cup
7. Mike Babcock, 2016 World Cup
8. Jon Cooper, 2025 4 Nations Face-Off

World Championships

1. Les Allen, 1930
2. Blake Wilson, 1931
3. Harold Ballard, 1933
4. Johnny Walker, 1934
5. Scotty Oliver, 1935
6. John Achtzener, 1937
7. Max Silverman, 1938, 1949
8. Elmer Piper, 1939
9. Jimmy Graham, 1950
10. Dick Gray, 1951
11. Greg Currie, 1954
12. Grant Warwick, 1955
13. Sid Smith, 1958
14. Ike Hildebrand, 1959
15. Bobby Kromm, 1961, 1963
16. Lloyd Roubell, 1962
17. Gord Simpson, 1965
18. Jackie McLeod, 1966, 1967, 1969
19. Johnny Wilson, 1977
20. Harry Howell, 1978
21. Marshall Johnston, 1979
22. Don Cherry, 1981
23. Red Berenson, 1982
24. Dave King, 1983, 1987, 1989, 1990, 1991, 1992
25. Doug Carpenter, 1985
26. Pat Quinn, 1986
27. Mike Keenan, 1993
28. George Kingston, 1994
29. Tom Renney, 1995, 1996, 2000
30. Andy Murray, 1997, 1998, 2003, 2007
31. Mike Johnston, 1999
32. Wayne Fleming, 2001, 2002
33. Mike Babcock, 2004
34. Marc Habscheid, 2005, 2006
35. Ken Hitchcock, 2008, 2011
36. Lindy Ruff, 2009, 2013
37. Craig MacTavish, 2010
38. Brent Sutter, 2012
39. Dave Tippett, 2014
40. Todd McLellan, 2015
41. Bill Peters, 2016, 2018
42. Jon Cooper, 2017
43. Alain Vigneault, 2019
44. Gerard Gallant, 2021
45. Claude Julien, 2022
46. André Tourigny, 2023, 2024
47. Dean Evason, 2025
48. Misha Donskov, 2026, 2027

== Uniform evolution ==
National team jerseys

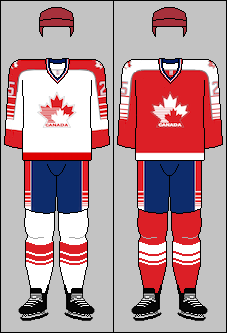
1984, 1988 Olympic jerseys

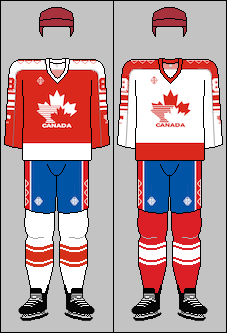
1992 Olympic jerseys

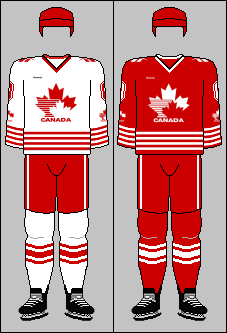
1994 Olympic jerseys

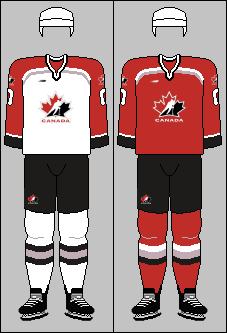
1998 Olympic jerseys

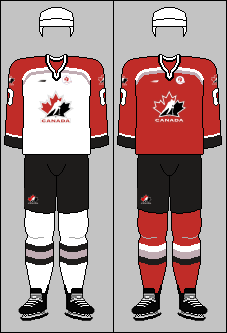
1998 IIHF jerseys

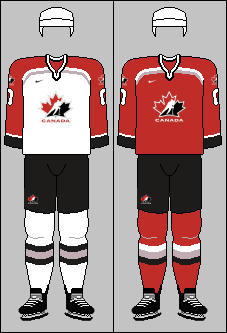
1999–2001 IIHF jerseys

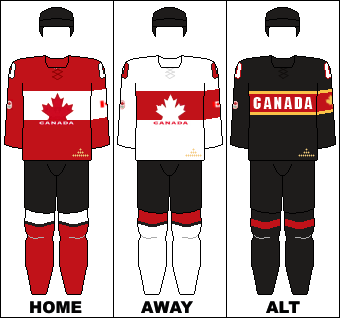
2014 Olympic jerseys

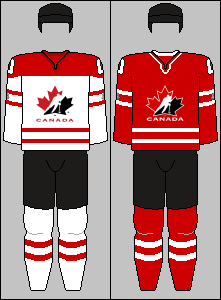
IIHF jerseys 2008-2014, 2016

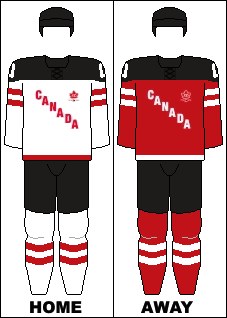
Centennial IIHF jerseys 2015

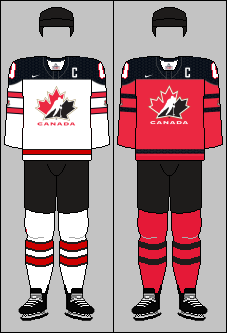
IIHF jerseys 2016-2018

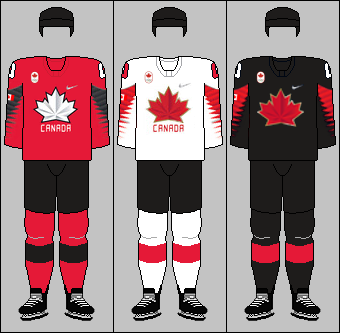
2018 Olympic jerseys

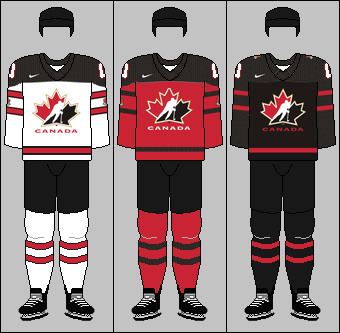
IIHF alternate jerseys 2018–present

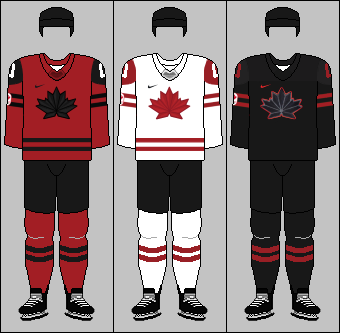
2022 Olympic jerseys

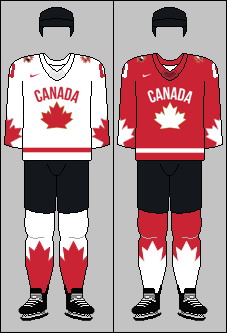
IIHF jerseys 2023–present

2026 Olympic jerseys

=== Notable jerseys ===
Team Canada

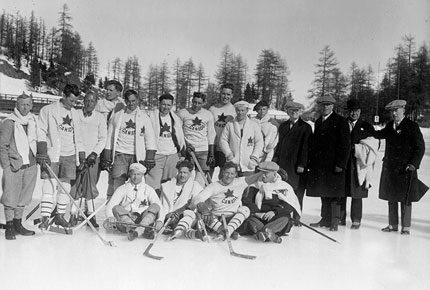
1928 Olympic jerseys

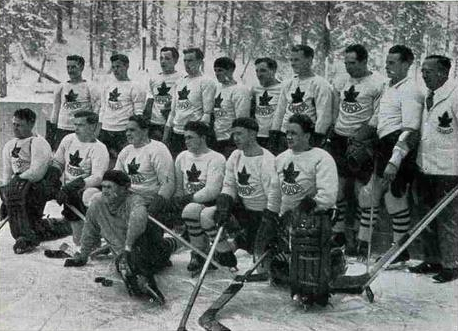
1936 Olympic jerseys

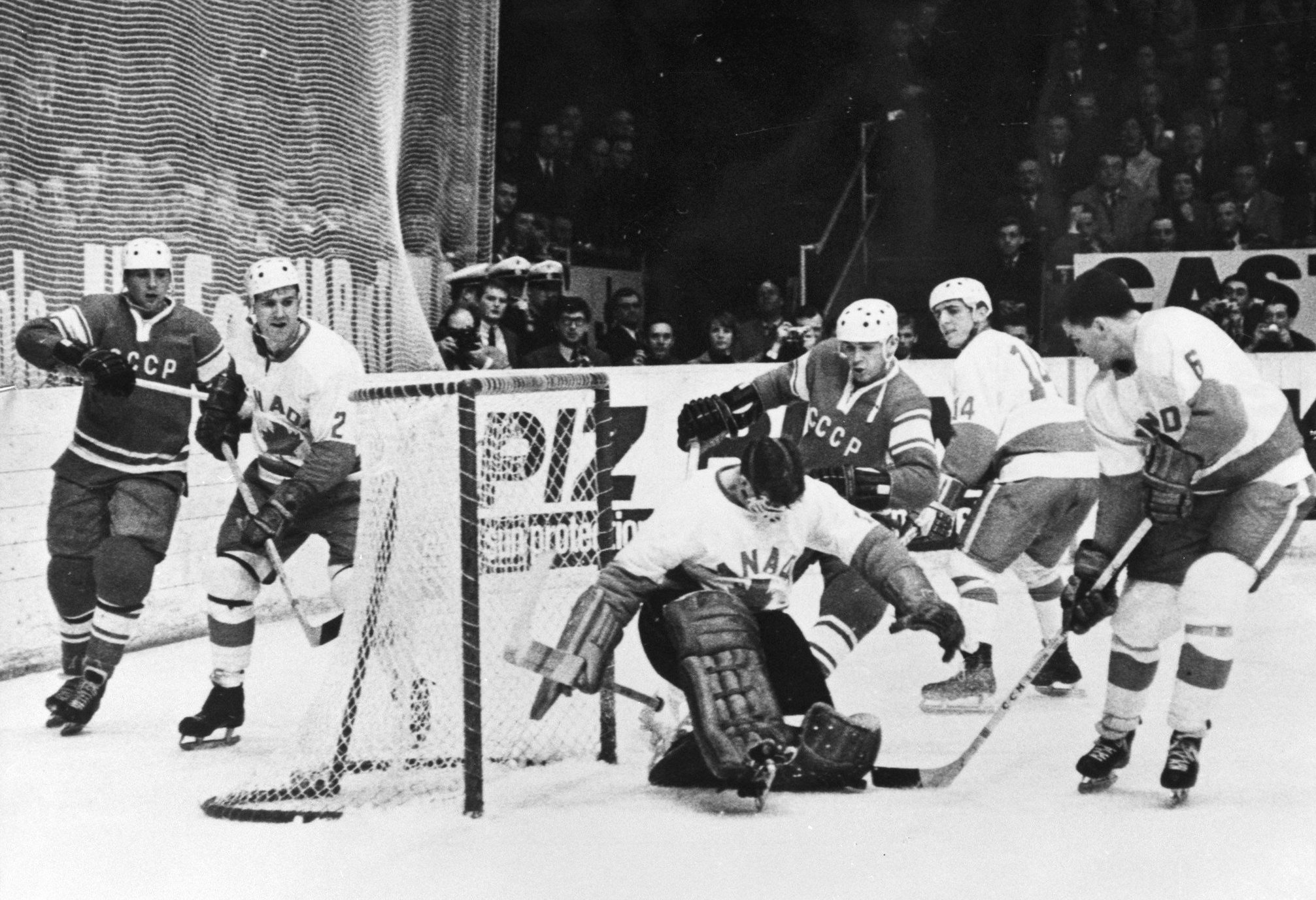
1964–1969 Olympic and IIHF jerseys

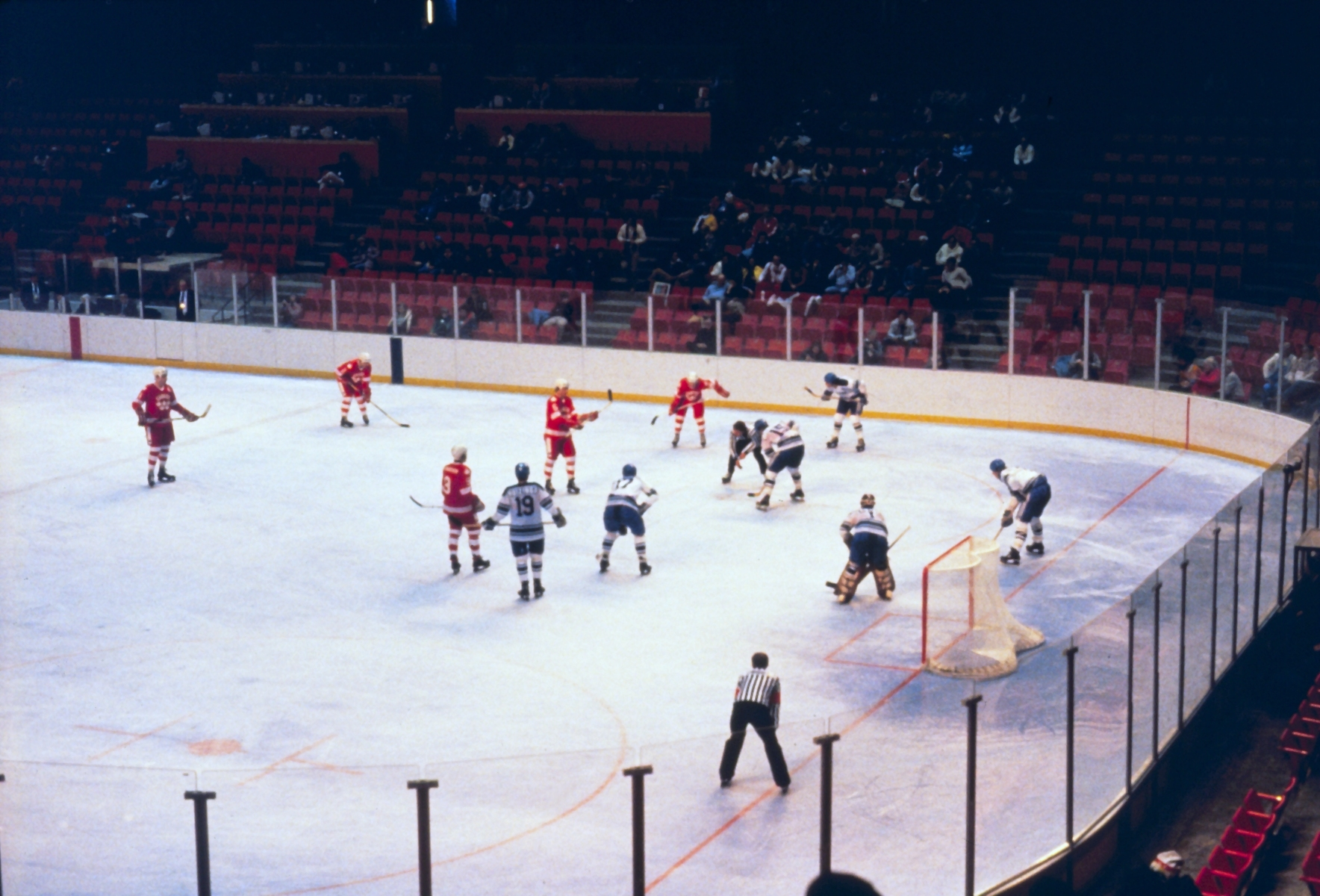
1980 Olympic jerseys

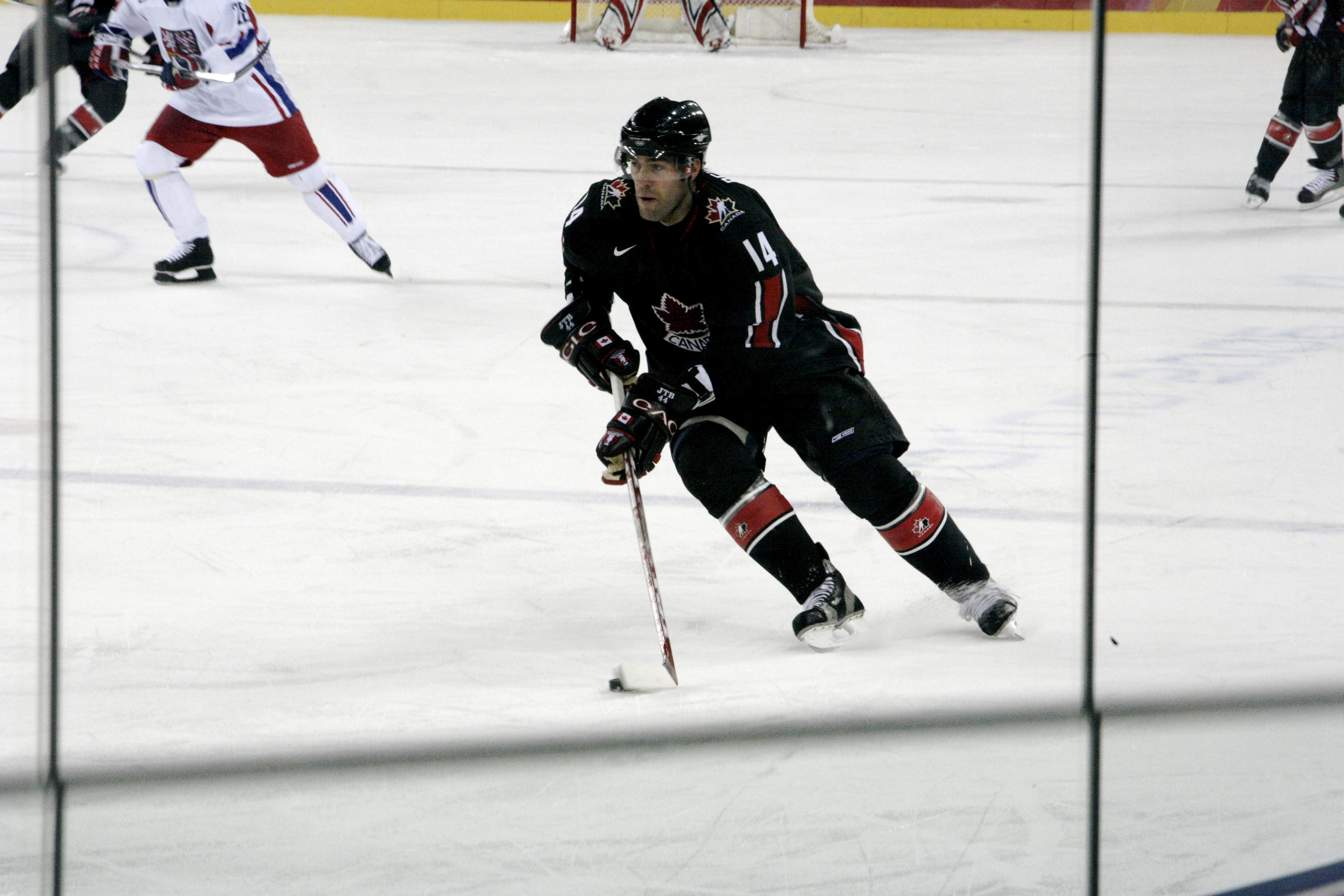
2002–2006 Olympic alternate jerseys

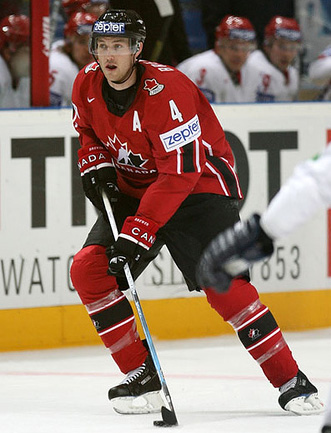
2007 IIHF jerseys

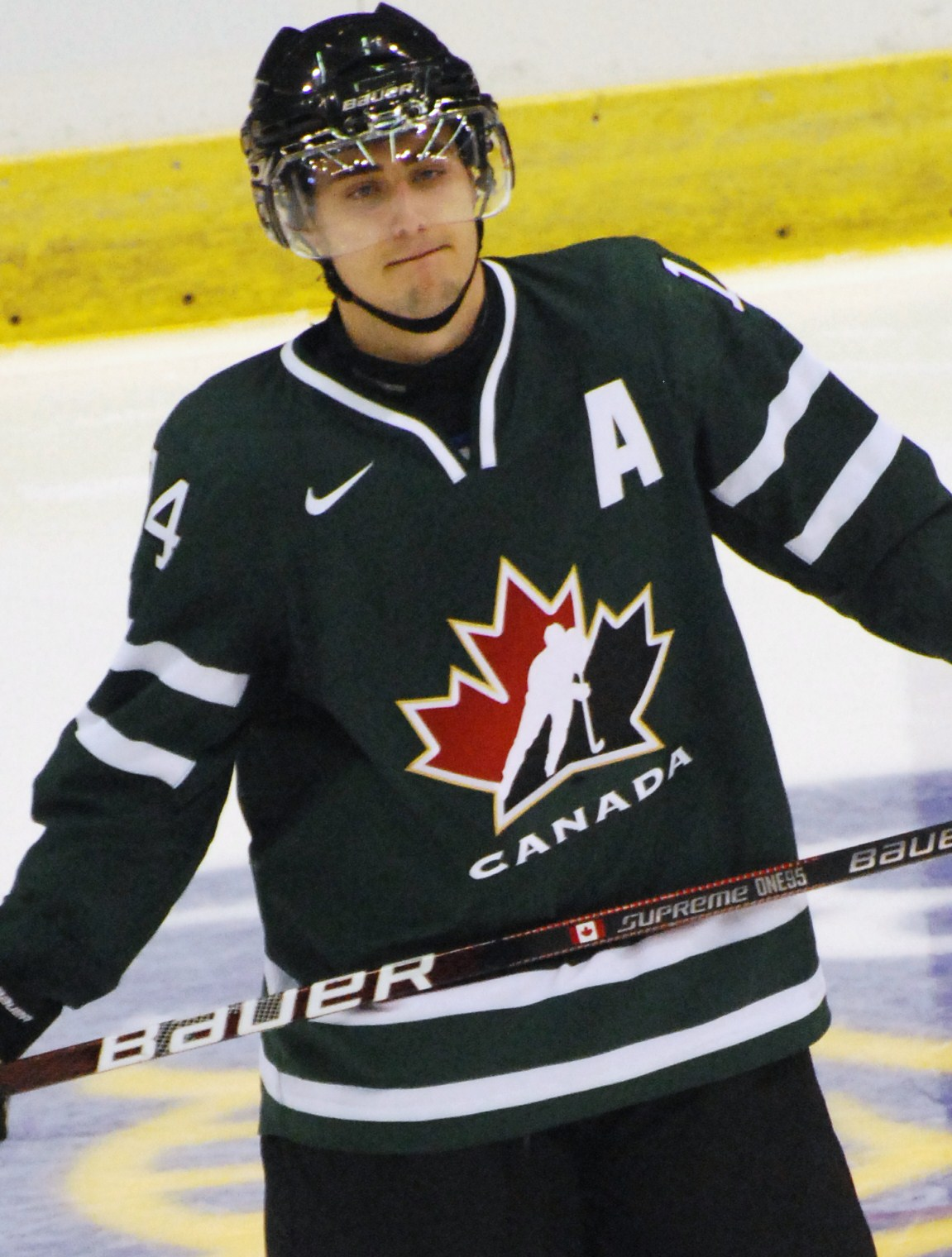
2010 IIHF alternate jerseys

== See also ==
- List of Canadian national ice hockey team rosters
- List of Olympic men's ice hockey players for Canada

== Bibliography ==
- Oliver, Greg (2017). Father Bauer and the Great Experiment: The Genesis of Canadian Olympic Hockey. Toronto, Ontario: ECW Press. ISBN 978-1-77041-249-1.
- McKinley, Michael (2014). It's Our Game: Celebrating 100 Years Of Hockey Canada. Toronto, Ontario: Viking Press. ISBN 978-0-670-06817-3.
- Podnieks, Andrew (1997). Canada's Olympic Hockey Teams: The Complete History, 1920–1998. Toronto: Doubleday Canada. ISBN 0-385-25688-4.
- Wallechinsky, David (2002). The Complete Book of the Winter Olympics (2002 ed.). New York: The Overlook Press. ISBN 1-58567-185-1.
- Meltzer, Bill NHL.com article on 2007 IIHF World Championship gold medal. Retrieved 2008-03-25.
