= Putaansuu =

Putaansuu is a Finnish surname. Notable people with the surname include:

- Tomi Petteri Putaansuu (Mr Lordi) (born 1974), Finnish musician and businessman
- Albert Putaansuu (1899–1976), Finnish-Canadian hockey player and coach
