= Jiří Jakeš =

Czech ice hockey player (born 1982)

- Born: October 4, 1982 (age 43) Prague, Czechoslovakia
- Height: 6 ft 4 in (193 cm)
- Weight: 243 lb (110 kg; 17 st 5 lb)
- Shot: Left
- Played for: HC Sparta Praha; HC Lasselsberger Plzeň
- NHL draft: 147th overall, 2001; Boston Bruins
- Playing career: 2002–2019

Jiří Jakeš (born October 4, 1982) is a Czech retired professional ice hockey player. He played four seasons in North America before returning to his native land in 2003. There he played one season in the top-level Extraliga before closing out his career in the lower leagues. Internationally Jakeš took part in the 2002 World Junior Ice Hockey Championships and three editions of the Winter Universiade, including 2009, when he captained the side.

== Career ==
Jakeš began his hockey career developing his skills within the HC Sparta Praha academy in the Czech Republic. Seeking to advance his prospects, he transitioned to North America by entering the Canadian Hockey League (CHL). In the 2000 CHL Import Draft, he was chosen 14th overall by the Brandon Wheat Kings, a team competing in the Western Hockey League (WHL). During his impressive rookie season with the Wheat Kings, Jakeš demonstrated his scoring ability by netting 22 goals throughout 64 games, which earned him an invitation to participate in the prestigious CHL Top Prospects Game. Despite his promise, and after being selected by the Boston Bruins as the 147th overall pick in the 2001 NHL entry draft and invited to the Boston Bruins training camp in 2001, Jakeš ultimately did not play in the NHL during his professional career.

In 2002, Jakeš had a brief stint in the West Coast Hockey League playing for the Anchorage Aces before going back to the WHL with the Tri-City Americans and Vancouver Giants. After being unable to secure a contract in North America, he returned to the Czech Republic, where he joined the training camp of HC Sparta Praha and played fourteen games during the 2003–04 Czech Extraliga season, thirteen with Sparta and one on loan with HC Lasselsberger Plzeň. He then spent the rest of his career competing in the Czech 1. liga and 2. liga, including the final eight years with HC Kobra Praha.

Jakeš was a member of the Czech Republic national team that took part in the 2002 World Junior Ice Hockey Championships. He also played for Czechia at the Winter Universiade in 2005, 2007 and 2009, and was the captain of the team in 2009.

During the 2014–15 season, he was captain of the Cobras. He had a strong start to the season, with ten goals in ten games, but then suffered a knee injury which required surgery. He was also the team's captain for the two next seasons, until his retirement in 2017.

== Career statistics ==
=== Regular season and playoffs ===
			Regular season					Playoffs
Season	Team	League	GP	G	A	Pts	PIM	GP	G	A	Pts	PIM
1999–2000	HC Sparta Praha	CZE U20	37	6	11	17	40	—	—	—	—	—
2000–01	Brandon Wheat Kings	WHL	64	22	16	38	73	6	1	1	2	4
2001–02	Brandon Wheat Kings	WHL	56	16	18	34	73	19	3	3	6	30
2002–03	Anchorage Aces	WCHL	21	4	8	12	4	—	—	—	—	—
2002–03	Tri–City Americans	WHL	10	3	1	4	18	—	—	—	—	—
2002–03	Vancouver Giants	WHL	31	15	20	35	54	4	2	0	2	6
2003–04	HC Sparta Praha	ELH	13	0	0	0	14	—	—	—	—	—
2003–04	HC Lasselsberger Plzeň	ELH	1	0	0	0	0	—	—	—	—	—
2003–04	HC Mladá Boleslav	CZE.2	8	0	1	1	28	—	—	—	—	—
2003–04	HC Benátky nad Jizerou	CZE.3	6	3	3	6	10	4	2	0	2	60
2004–05	BK Mladá Boleslav	CZE.2	1	0	0	0	0	—	—	—	—	—
2004–05	IHC Písek	CZE.2	1	0	0	0	0	—	—	—	—	—
2004–05	HC Benátky nad Jizerou	CZE.3	29	12	12	24	113	4	0	1	1	10
2005–06	UHK Lev Slaný	CZE.3	26	9	13	22	73	—	—	—	—	—
2005–06	HC Benátky nad Jizerou	CZE.3	7	2	5	7	8	10	3	8	11	16
2006–07	HC Benátky nad Jizerou	CZE.3	36	15	18	33	105	11	2	3	5	47
2007–08	HC Benátky nad Jizerou	CZE.3	34	13	29	42	54	16	11	3	14	26
2008–09	HC Junior Mělník	CZE.3	31	28	16	44	157	3	2	1	3	4
2009–10	HC Roudnice nad Labem	CZE.3	27	17	15	32	82	—	—	—	—	—
2010–11	HC Česká Lípa	CZE.3	35	11	17	28	74	—	—	—	—	—
2011–12	HC Kobra Praha	CZE.3	35	32	28	60	113	7	2	4	6	38
2012–13	HC Kobra Praha	CZE.3	34	29	28	57	113	5	4	4	8	6
2013–14	HC Kobra Praha	CZE.3	31	21	28	49	82	5	4	2	6	24
2014–15	HC Kobra Praha	CZE.3	13	12	11	23	38	11	6	9	15	20
2015–16	HC Kobra Praha	CZE.3	30	20	14	34	98	9	1	7	8	10
2016–17	HC Kobra Praha	CZE.3	36	26	33	59	80	11	9	11	20	47
ELH totals			14	0	0	0	14	—	—	—	—	—
CZE.3 totals			410	250	270	520	1200	96	46	53	99	308

=== International ===
Year	Team	Event	GP	G	A	Pts	PIM
2002	Czech Republic	WJC	7	0	0	0	0
Junior totals			7	0	0	0	0
