= 1935 Ice Hockey World Championships =

1935 edition of the World Ice Hockey Championships

Tournament details
- Host country: Switzerland
- Venue: 1 (in 1 host city)
- Dates: 19–27 January
- Teams: 15

Final positions
- Champions: Canada (8th title)
- Runners-up: Switzerland
- Third place: Great Britain
- Fourth place: Czechoslovakia

Tournament statistics
- Games played: 50
- Goals scored: 254 (5.08 per game)

The 1935 Ice Hockey World Championships were held from January 19 to January 27, 1935, at the Eisstadion Davos in Davos, Switzerland, in which a record 15 countries took part. The teams first played in four preliminary round groups (three groups of four and a group of three). Unlike in the previous year, Canada participated in the preliminary round. The first two teams in each group advanced to the semifinal round, while the remaining seven played in a consolation round to determine positions 9 through 15. In the semifinal round there were two groups of four teams. The first two teams in each group advanced to a final round while the remaining teams played for positions 5 though 8. Canada won its eighth world championship title while the host, Switzerland, won its second European championship.

== First round ==
=== Group A ===
Pos	Team	Pld	W	D	L	GF	GA	GD	Pts	Qualification or relegation
1	Switzerland (H)	3	2	1	0	11	2	+9	5	Advance to semifinal round
2	Sweden	3	2	0	1	10	6	+4	4	Advance to semifinal round
3	Hungary	3	1	1	1	7	4	+3	3	Relegation to consolation round
4	Netherlands	3	0	0	3	0	16	−16	0	Relegation to consolation round

Source: Complete results
(H) Hosts

January 19 to January 21
Hungary	6–0	Netherlands
Switzerland	6-1	Sweden
Sweden	6-0	Netherlands
Switzerland	1-1	Hungary
Sweden	3-0	Hungary
Switzerland	4-0	Netherlands

=== Group B ===
Pos	Team	Pld	W	D	L	GF	GA	GD	Pts	Qualification or relegation
1	France	3	2	1	0	6	4	+2	5	Advance to semifinal round
2	Italy	3	1	2	0	4	2	+2	4	Advance to semifinal round
3	Poland	3	1	1	1	6	5	+1	3	Relegation to consolation round
4	Germany	3	0	0	3	2	7	−5	0	Relegation to consolation round

Source: Complete results

January 19 to January 21
France	3–2	Poland
Italy	2-0	Germany
France	1-1	Italy
Poland	3-1	Germany
Italy	1-1	Poland
France	2-1	Germany

=== Group C ===
Pos	Team	Pld	W	D	L	GF	GA	GD	Pts	Qualification or relegation
1	Czechoslovakia	3	3	0	0	28	3	+25	6	Advance to semifinal round
2	Austria	3	2	0	1	9	4	+5	4	Advance to semifinal round
3	Romania	3	1	0	2	5	7	−2	2	Relegation to consolation round
4	Belgium	3	0	0	3	2	30	−28	0	Relegation to consolation round

Source: Complete results

January 19 to January 21
Romania	2–1	Belgium
Czechoslovakia	2-1	Austria
Austria	6-1	Belgium
Czechoslovakia	4-2	Romania
Austria	2-1	Romania
Czechoslovakia	22-0	Belgium

=== Group D ===
Pos	Team	Pld	W	D	L	GF	GA	GD	Pts	Qualification or relegation
1	Canada	2	2	0	0	18	2	+16	4	Advance to semifinal round
2	Great Britain	2	1	0	1	7	5	+2	2	Advance to semifinal round
3	Latvia	2	0	0	2	1	19	−18	0	Relegation to consolation round

Source: Complete results

January 19 to January 21
Canada	4–2	Great Britain
Canada	14-0	Latvia
Great Britain	5-1	Latvia

== Semifinal round ==
=== Group A ===
Pos	Team	Pld	W	D	L	GF	GA	GD	Pts	Qualification or relegation
1	Canada	3	3	0	0	16	3	+13	6	Advance to championship round
2	Czechoslovakia	3	2	0	1	8	4	+4	4	Advance to championship round
3	Sweden	3	0	1	2	4	8	−4	1	Relegation to 5th-8th place round
4	Italy	3	0	1	2	2	15	−13	1	Relegation to 5th-8th place round

Source: Complete results

January 22 to January 24
Czechoslovakia	5–1 (OT)	Italy
Canada	5-2	Sweden
Czechoslovakia	2-1 (OT)	Sweden
Canada	9-0	Italy
Sweden	1-1*	Italy
Canada	2-1	Czechoslovakia

* Teams jointly decided not to play extra time.

=== Group B ===
Pos	Team	Pld	W	D	L	GF	GA	GD	Pts	Qualification or relegation
1	Switzerland	3	2	1	0	7	2	+5	5	Advance to championship round
2	Great Britain	3	2	0	1	5	2	+3	4	Advance to championship round
3	Austria	3	1	1	1	6	6	0	3	Relegation to 5th-8th place round
4	France	3	0	0	3	2	10	−8	0	Relegation to 5th-8th place round

Source: Complete results

January 22 to January 24
Great Britain	1-0	France
Switzerland	1-1 (OT)	Austria
Great Britain	4-1	Austria
Switzerland	5-1	France
Austria	4-1	France
Switzerland	1-0	Great Britain

== Consolation round – 9th to 15th places ==
=== Group A ===
Pos	Team	Pld	W	D	L	GF	GA	GD	Pts	Qualification or relegation
1	Poland	2	1	1	0	13	3	+10	3	Advance to 9th-place match
2	Hungary	2	1	1	0	7	2	+5	3	
3	Belgium	2	0	0	2	3	18	−15	0	

Source: Complete results

January 23 to January 25
Poland	12–2	Belgium
Hungary	6-1	Belgium
Poland	1-1	Hungary

=== Group B ===
Pos	Team	Pld	W	D	L	GF	GA	GD	Pts	Qualification or relegation
1	Germany	3	3	0	0	11	1	+10	6	Advance to 9th-place match
2	Romania	3	2	0	1	9	5	+4	4	
3	Latvia	3	1	0	2	10	6	+4	2	
4	Netherlands	3	0	0	3	0	18	−18	0	

Source: Complete results

January 23 to January 25
Germany	5-0	Netherlands
Romania	3-2	Latvia
Romania	6-0	Netherlands
Germany	3-1	Latvia
Latvia	7-0	Netherlands
Germany	3-0	Romania

9th-place match

January 27
Germany	5-1	Poland

== Consolation round – 5th to 8th places ==
Classification Matches

January 26
Sweden	2-1	France
Austria	2-1	Italy

5th-place match

January 27
Sweden	3-1	Austria

France and Italy decide by common agreement not to play the classification match for seventh place because of too many injured players on both teams.

== Final round – 1st to 4th places ==
Pos	Team	Pld	W	D	L	GF	GA	GD	Pts	Final result
1	Canada	3	3	0	0	12	3	+9	6	World Champions
2	Switzerland (H)	3	2	0	1	7	4	+3	4	European champions
3	Great Britain	3	1	0	2	2	8	−6	2	Third place
4	Czechoslovakia	3	0	0	3	2	8	−6	0	Fourth place

Source: Complete results
(H) Hosts

January 26 to January 27
Switzerland	1-0	Great Britain
Canada	2-1	Czechoslovakia
Canada	6-0	Great Britain
Switzerland	4-0	Czechoslovakia
Great Britain	2-1 (OT)	Czechoslovakia
Canada	4-2	Switzerland

=== Final rankings – World Championship ===
RF	Team
1	Canada
2	Switzerland
3	Great Britain
4	Czechoslovakia
5	Sweden
6	Austria
7	France
7	Italy
9	Germany
10	Poland
11	Hungary
11	Romania
13	Latvia
14	Belgium
14	Netherlands

=== Final rankings – European Championship ===
RF	Team
1	Switzerland
2	Great Britain
3	Czechoslovakia
4	Sweden
5	Austria
6	France
6	Italy
8	Germany
9	Poland
10	Hungary
10	Romania
12	Latvia
13	Belgium
13	Netherlands
