= Toronto CCMs =

Canadian senior ice hockey team

The Toronto CCMs were a Canadian senior ice hockey team. They represented the Canada men's national ice hockey team at the 1930 World Ice Hockey Championships held in Germany. The team won the gold medal by defeating the Germany men's national ice hockey team by a score of 6-1 in the gold medal game.

Prior to representing Canada at the 1930 World Championships the team had won both the Toronto and the York Mercantile League.
