= Misha Donskov =

Canadian ice hockey coach and executive (born 1977)

- Born: April 24, 1977 (age 49) Montreal, Quebec, Canada
- Coaching career: 2001–present
Medal record
Representing Canada
Men's ice hockey (assistant coach)
World Championship
Gold medal – first place	2015 Czech Republic
Gold medal – first place	2016 Russia
World Junior Championships
Gold medal – first place	2015 Canada
Bronze medal – third place	2026 United States
World U18 Championships
Bronze medal – third place	2014 Finland
4 Nations Face-Off
Winner	2025 Canada/United States

Misha Donskov (born April 24, 1977) is a Canadian ice hockey coach and executive who is the vice president of hockey operations at Hockey Canada and assistant coach of the Canada men's national team. On August 27, 2026 while maintaining his roles with Hockey Canada, has joined the Edmonton Oilers as a coaching consultant. He was previously an assistant coach of the Dallas Stars and Vegas Golden Knights in the National Hockey League (NHL), as well as the director of hockey operations for the Golden Knights. Donskov has served as a "pre-scout" who watches video and analytics to relay information to the head coach and players.

== Coaching career ==
In 2001, Donskov joined the Columbus Blue Jackets as a team consultant focused on team development and coaching minor ice hockey. In 2004, he moved to the Atlanta Thrashers and took on the same role. In the 2009–10 season, Donskov was a graduate assistant coach for the Western Mustangs of the Canadian Interuniversity Sport (CIS) and an assistant with the London Knights of the Ontario Hockey League (OHL). He spent three seasons with the Knights and won the J. Ross Robertson Cup in 2011–12 as an assistant coach and assistant general manager. From 2012 to 2014 he was an assistant coach for the Ottawa 67's.

Donskov later served as video coach for Canada's national teams at the World U18 Championships, World Junior Championships, Spengler Cup and World Championships from 2014 to 2016. He was part of gold medalist Canada's coaching staff in the 2016 World Cup of Hockey.

Donskov joined the Vegas Golden Knights as director of hockey operations prior to their inaugural 2017–18 NHL season, where they won the Western Conference before falling to the Washington Capitals in five games in the 2018 Stanley Cup Final. He stayed in this role until the 2020 Stanley Cup playoffs where the Golden Knights moved him to an assistant coach role under head coach Peter DeBoer. He was the Golden Knights' assistant coach in the 2022–23 season where they won the 2023 Stanley Cup, before becoming an assistant coach for Peter DeBoer and the Dallas Stars during the 2023 NHL off-season.

Donskov spent two seasons with the Stars, both culminating in Western Conference finals losses to the Edmonton Oilers. He was also part of Canada's coaching staff under head coach Jon Cooper at the 2025 4 Nations Face-Off, where Canada won the tournament.

On June 27, 2025, Donskov was hired by Hockey Canada as vice president of hockey operations and coach of the Canada men's national team. Donskov would also have an involvement with the Canada men's junior team and have a strategic role with the men's under-17 and under-18 programs. On July 21, Donskov was named an assistant coach for Jon Cooper and Canada at the 2026 Winter Olympics. He played a role in the player selections for the tournament, where Canada went on to win a silver medal.

On April 30, 2026, Hockey Canada announced that Donskov would be the head coach of Canada at the 2026 World Championship, 2027 World Junior Championships and the 2027 IIHF World Championship.

== Personal life ==
Donskov was born on April 24, 1977, in Montreal to a Russian-Serbian father and an American mother. His father, Paul, was born in Belgrade, Serbia, in 1944 and immigrated to Canada from a refugee camp in Italy in 1954. In 1990, Donskov's family moved to Columbus, Ohio, and joined minor hockey circles. After Paul died in 2020, the Columbus Blue Jackets and the Donskov family announced the Paul Donskov Legacy Scholarship, in memory of Paul's work in minor hockey in Columbus.

Donskov and his family run Donskov Hockey Development, a hockey school in Columbus, Ohio. In 2023, after winning the Stanley Cup with the Vegas Golden Knights, Donskov brought the Stanley Cup to his father's locker room stall at the school on his day with the Cup.

Donskov has a master's degree in kineseology from the University of Western Ontario.
