= 1930 Ice Hockey World Championships =

1930 edition of the World Ice Hockey Championships

Tournament details
- Host countries: France; Austria; Germany
- Venues: 3 (in 3 host cities)
- Dates: 29 January – 10 February
- Teams: 12

Final positions
- Champions: Canada (4th title)
- Runners-up: Germany
- Third place: Switzerland
- Fourth place: Austria

Tournament statistics
- Games played: 12
- Goals scored: 49 (4.08 per game)

The 1930 Ice Hockey World Championships were held between January 30 and February 10, 1930, in Chamonix, France, Vienna, Austria, and Berlin, Germany. This event was the first world championships independent of hockey at the Olympics.

Canada, represented by the Toronto CCMs, beat the German team in the gold medal match by a score of 6 to 1 to win the title.

Germany won their first European Championship, defeating Switzerland in Berlin two to one. The lone game in Vienna was played to determine the European Bronze, Austria shutout Poland two to zero to round out the medals.

== Final tournament ==
First round
31 January 1930	Stade Olympique, Chamonix	Germany	–	Great Britain	4:2 (0:2, 2:0, 2:0)
31 January 1930	Stade Olympique, Chamonix	Hungary	–	Italy	2:0 (0:0, 2:0, 0:0)
31 January 1930	Stade Olympique, Chamonix	France	–	Belgium	4:1 (0:1, 2:0, 2:0)
Quarterfinals
1 February 1930	Stade Olympique, Chamonix	Poland	–	Japan	5:0 (2:0, 2:0, 1:0)
1 February 1930	Stade Olympique, Chamonix	Switzerland	–	Czechoslovakia	3:1 (2:1, 1:0, 0:0)
1 February 1930	Stade Olympique, Chamonix	Germany	–	Hungary	4:1 (1:0, 0:0, 3:1)
1 February 1930	Stade Olympique, Chamonix	France	–	Austria	1:2 (1:1, 0:0, 0:1)
Semifinals
2 February 1930	Stade Olympique, Chamonix	Switzerland	–	Austria	2:1 (0:0, 1:1, 1:0)
2 February 1930	Stade Olympique, Chamonix	Germany	–	Poland	3:1 (1:1, 2:0, 0:0)
4th place
5 February 1930	WEV-Platz, Vienna	Austria	–	Poland	2:0 (0:0, 0:0, 2:0)
Final
9 February 1930	Sportpalast, Berlin	Germany	–	Switzerland	2:1 (0:1, 1:0, 1:0)

=== Final ===
10 February 1930	Sportpalast, Berlin	Germany	–	Canada	1:6 (1:2, 0:2, 0:2)

The tournament was a direct knock-out playoff. The Canadian team was considered so dominant that it did not participate in the knock-out tournament. Canada was put into the gold medal final game, and the tournament was played to determine an opponent.

Warm winter weather melted the ice in Chamonix, France and forced the Ligue Internationale de Hockey sur Glace officials to move the tournament to Berlin, Germany, and the Sportpalast (which had artificial ice). Additionally, the fourth place match was played in Vienna, Austria, making this the only world hockey championship tournament to take place in three different countries.

The Canadian team lost to Austria 1-0 on February 7 (in Vienna) in an exhibition match. The loss to Austria was the first time any Canadian team had lost to a European team.

== Ranking and statistics ==
1930 World Championship winners

Canada
4th title

=== Final standings ===
The final standings of the tournament:

Gold medal	Canada
Silver medal	Germany
Bronze medal	Switzerland
4	Austria
5	Poland
6	France
6	Hungary
6	Czechoslovakia
6	Japan
10	Great Britain
10	Italy
10	Belgium

=== Canadian winning team ===
- Gordon Grant, Alex Park, Joe Griffin, Willie Adams, Howard Armstrong, Bert Clayton, Fred Radke, Don Hutchinson, Percy Timpson (GK), Les Allen coach

== European Championship medal table ==
Gold medal	Germany
Silver medal	Switzerland
Bronze medal	Austria
4	Poland
5	Czechoslovakia
5	Hungary
5	France
8	Great Britain
8	Italy
8	Belgium
