= Ice hockey at the Winter World University Games =

- Events: 2 (men: 1; women: 1)

Games
- 1959; 1960; 1961; 1962; 1963; 1964; 1965; 1966; 1967; 1968; 1970; 1970; 1973; 1972; 1975; 1975; 1977; 1978; 1979; 1981; 1983; 1985; 1987; 1989; 1991; 1993; 1995; 1997; 1999; 2001; 2003; 2005; 2007; 2009; 2011; 2013; 2015; 2017; 2019; 2023; 2025

Ice hockey tournaments have been staged at the Universiade since 1962. The men's tournament was introduced in 1962. The women's tournament was introduced in 2009.

== Medal winners ==
Men

Year	Gold	Silver	Bronze
1962	Czechoslovakia	Soviet Union	Sweden
1966	Soviet Union	Romania	Czechoslovakia
1968	Soviet Union	Czechoslovakia	Canada
1970	Czechoslovakia	Soviet Union	Finland
1972	Soviet Union	Canada	United States
1981	Canada	Finland	Japan
1983	Czechoslovakia	Soviet Union	Romania
1985	Soviet Union	Czechoslovakia	Finland
1987	Czechoslovakia	Soviet Union	Canada
1989	Soviet Union	Czechoslovakia	Finland
1991	Canada	Soviet Union	Finland
1993	Russia	Kazakhstan	Slovakia
1995	Kazakhstan	Czech Republic	Russia
1997	Czech Republic	Finland	Canada
1999	Ukraine	Slovakia	Canada
2001	Slovakia	Canada	Ukraine
2003	Russia	Slovakia	Canada
2005	Russia	Czech Republic	Finland
2007	Canada	Russia	Kazakhstan
2009	Russia	Canada	Slovakia
2011	Russia	Belarus	Canada
2013	Canada	Kazakhstan	Russia
2015	Russia	Kazakhstan	Canada
2017	Russia	Kazakhstan	Canada
2019	Russia	Slovakia	Canada
2023	Canada	United States	Kazakhstan
2025	Canada	Slovakia	Ukraine

=== Men's results ===
Last updated during the 2025 Winter World University Games

Team	(Switzerland) 1962	(Italy) 1966	(Austria) 1968	(Finland) 1970	(United States) 1972	(Spain) 1981	(Bulgaria) 1983	(Italy) 1985	(Czechoslovakia) 1987	(Bulgaria) 1989	(Japan) 1991	(Poland) 1993	(Spain) 1995	(South Korea) 1997	(Slovakia) 1999	(Poland) 2001	(Italy) 2003	(Austria) 2005	(Italy) 2007	(China) 2009	(Turkey) 2011	(Italy) 2013	(Spain) 2015	(Kazakhstan) 2017	(Russia) 2019	(United States) 2023	(Italy) 2025	(China) 2027
Soviet Union	2nd	1st	1st	2nd	1st	-	2nd	1st	2nd	1st	2nd	-	-	-	-	-	-	-	-	-	-	-	-	-	-	-	-	-
Czechoslovakia	1st	3rd	3rd	1st	-	-	1st	2nd	1st	2nd	-	-	-	-	-	-	-	-	-	-	-	-	-	-	-	-	-	-
Sweden	3rd	-	5th	-	-	-	-	-	-	-	-	-	-	-	-	-	-	-	-	-	-	10th	9th	8th	12th	11th	9th	-
Switzerland	4th	-	-	5th	-	-	-	-	-	-	-	-	-	-	-	-	-	-	-	-	-	-	-	-	8th	-	-	-
Romania	-	2nd	-	-	-	-	3rd	-	-	-	-	-	-	-	-	-	-	-	-	-	-	-	-	-	-	-	-	-
Canada	-	4th	3rd	-	2nd	1st	-	-	3rd	-	1st	-	-	3rd	3rd	2nd	3rd	6th	1st	2nd	1st	3rd	3rd	3rd	3rd	1st	1st	Q
Finland	-	5th	4th	3rd	-	2nd	5th	3rd	4th	3rd	3rd	-	4th	2nd	5th	-	5th	3rd	4th	-	-	-	-	-	-	-	-	-
Italy	-	6th	-	-	-	-	-	6th	-	-	-	-	-	-	-	-	4th	5th	6th	-	-	6th	-	-	-	-	-	
Yugoslavia	-	7th	-	-	-	-	-	-	7th	-	-	-	-	-	-	-	-	-	-	-	-	-	-	-	-	-	-	-
Austria	-	8th	6th	-	-	-	-	-	-	-	-	-	-	-	-	-	-	4th	-	-	-	-	-	-	-	-	-	-
Hungary	-	9th	-	-	-	-	-	-	-	-	-	-	-	-	-	-	-	-	-	-	-	-	-	-	10th	8th	-	-
Japan	-	-	-	4th	-	3rd	4th	5th	5th	6th	6th	4th	7th	5th	7th	7th	9th	8th	8th	5th	6th	11th	6th	7th	11th	4th	7th	Q
United States	-	-	-	-	3rd	-	-	-	-	4th	5th	-	-	-	-	8th	11th	9th	9th	7th	7th	4th	7th	9th	7th	2nd	4th	Q
Bulgaria	-	-	-	-	-	-	6th	-	-	-	-	-	-	-	-	-	-	-	-	-	-	-	-	-	-	-	-	-
China	-	-	-	-	-	-	-	4th	6th	-	-	-	6th	6th	7th	-	10th	12th	-	8th	-	-	11th	-	-	-	-	Q
Spain	-	-	-	-	-	4th	-	-	-	-	-	-	-	-	-	-	-	-	-	-	9th	-	10th	-	-	-	-	-
South Korea	-	-	-	-	-	5th	7th	7th	9th	5th	7th	6th	8th	6th	8th	-	8th	11th	11th	9th	-	9th	8th	11th	-	9th	8th	Q
North Korea	-	-	-	-	-	-	-	-	8th	-	4th	-	-	-	-	-	-	-	-	-	-	-	-	-	-	-	-	-
Russia	-	-	-	-	-	-	-	-	-	-	-	1st	3rd	4th	4th	5th	1st	1st	2nd	1st	1st	3rd	1st	1st	1st	-	-	
Kazakhstan	-	-	-	-	-	-	-	-	-	-	-	2nd	1st	-	-	-	-	-	3rd	4th	4th	2nd	2nd	2nd	4th	3rd	5th	Q
Slovakia	-	-	-	-	-	-	-	-	-	-	-	3rd	-	-	2nd	1st	6th	5th	5th	3rd	5th	5th	5th	5th	2nd	5th	2nd	Q
Poland	-	-	-	-	-	-	-	-	-	-	-	5th	-	-	-	6th	-	-	-	-	-	-	-	-	-	-	10th	Q
Czech Republic	-	-	-	-	-	-	-	-	-	-	-	-	2nd	1st	5th	4th	7th	6th	7th	6th	4th	4th	6th	7th	5th	7th	6th	Q
Ukraine	-	-	-	-	-	-	-	-	-	-	-	-	5th	-	1st	3rd	5th	10th	-	-	-	9th	-	-	6th	6th	3rd	-
Croatia	-	-	-	-	-	-	-	-	-	-	-	-	-	-	9th	-	-	-	-	-	-	-	-	-	-	-	-	-
Great Britain	-	-	-	-	-	-	-	-	-	-	-	-	-	-	-	-	-	-	11th	10th	-	12th	-	10th	9th	12th	-	Q
Belarus	-	-	-	-	-	-	-	-	-	-	-	-	-	-	-	-	-	-	-	-	2nd	-	-	-	-	-	-	
Slovenia	-	-	-	-	-	-	-	-	-	-	-	-	-	-	-	-	-	-	-	-	8th	-	-	-	-	-	-	-
Latvia	-	-	-	-	-	-	-	-	-	-	-	-	-	-	-	-	-	-	-	-	-	8th	-	6th	6th	10th	-	-
Individual Neutral Athletes	-	-	-	-	-	-	-	-	-	-	-	-	-	-	-	-	-	-	-	-	-	-	-	-	-	-	-	Q
Number of teams	4	9	6	5	3	5	7	7	9	6	7	6	8	8	9	8	11	12	11	10	12	12	11	12	12	12	10	10

== Medal winners ==
Women

Year	Gold	Silver	Bronze
2009	Canada	China	Finland
2011	Canada	Finland	Slovakia
2013	Canada	Russia	United States
2015	Russia	Canada	Japan
2017	Russia	Canada	United States
2019	Russia	Canada	Japan
2023	Canada	Japan	Czech Republic
2025	Czech Republic	Canada	Japan

=== Women's results ===
Last updated after the 2025 Winter World University Games

Team	(China) 2009	(Turkey) 2011	(Italy) 2013	(Spain) 2015	(Kazakhstan) 2017	(Russia) 2019	(United States) 2023	(Italy) 2025	(China) 2027
Canada	1st	1st	1st	2nd	2nd	2nd	1st	2nd	Q
China	2nd	-	-	4th	4th	5th	-	-	Q
Finland	3rd	2nd	-	-	-	-	-	-	-
Slovakia	4th	3rd	-	-	-	-	4th	4th	Q
Japan	5th	-	4th	3rd	5th	3rd	2nd	3rd	Q
Great Britain	6th	5th	5th	-	7th	-	6th	8th	-
United States	-	4th	3rd	5th	3rd	4th	5th	5th	Q
Turkey	-	6th	-	-	-	-	-	-	-
Russia	-	-	2nd	1st	1st	1st	-	-	-
Spain	-	-	6th	7th	-	-	-	-	-
Kazakhstan	-	-	-	6th	6th	-	-	6th	-
Switzerland	-	-	-	-	-	6th	-	-	-
Czech Republic	-	-	-	-	-	-	3rd	1st	Q
Chinese Taipei	-	-	-	-	-	-	-	7th	-
Iran	-	-	-	-	-	-	-	-	Q
Individual Neutral Athletes	-	-	-	-	-	-	-	-	Q
Number of teams	6	6	6	7	7	6	6	8	8

== Medal table ==
Last updated during the 2025 Winter World University Games

Rank	Nation	Gold	Silver	Bronze	Total
1	Russia (RUS)	11	2	2	15
2	Canada (CAN)	10	7	9	26
3	Soviet Union (URS)	5	5	0	10
4	Czechoslovakia (TCH)	4	3	1	8
5	Czech Republic (CZE)	2	2	1	5
6	Slovakia (SVK)	1	4	3	8
7	Kazakhstan (KAZ)	1	4	2	7
8	Ukraine (UKR)	1	0	2	3
9	Finland (FIN)	0	3	6	9
10	Japan (JPN)	0	1	4	5
11	United States (USA)	0	1	3	4
12	Romania (ROU)	0	1	1	2
13	Belarus (BLR)	0	1	0	1
13	China (CHN)	0	1	0	1
15	Sweden (SWE)	0	0	1	1
Totals (15 entries)		35	35	35	105
