= Guðmundur Sigurjónsson Hofdal =

Icelandic athlete and trainer

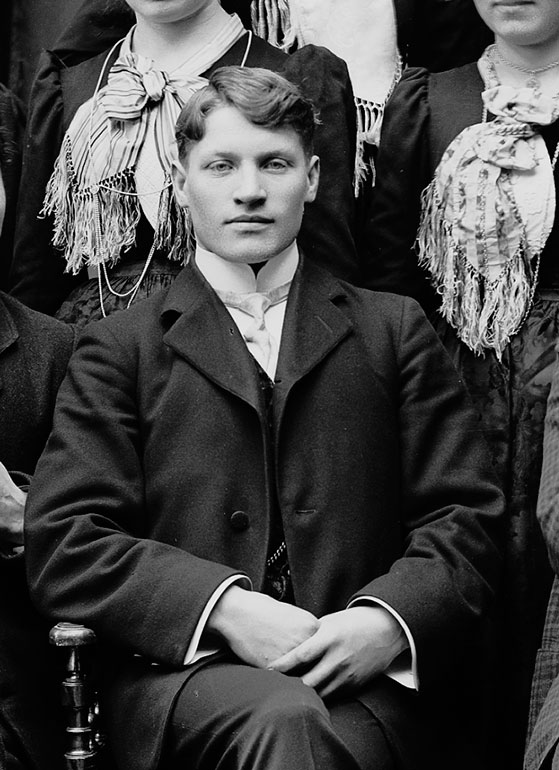
- Guðmundur in 1905.

Personal information
- Full name: Guðmundur Sigurjónsson Hofdal
- Nickname: Gordon
- Nationality: Icelandic
- Born: Guðmundur Sigurjónsson; 15 April 1883 Litlaströnd, Norður-Þingeyjarsýsla, Iceland
- Died: 14 January 1967 (aged 83) Reykjavík, Iceland
- Military career
- Allegiance: Canada
- Branch: 27th Battalion, CEF
- Service years: 1916–1919
- Rank: Sergeant
- Conflicts: World War I

Sport
- Sport: Glíma; Ice hockey

Olympic medal record

Men's Ice hockey

Coach for Canada
Gold medal – first place	1920 Antwerp	Team competition

Guðmundur "Gordon" Sigurjónsson Hofdal (15 April 1883 – 14 January 1967) was an Icelandic athlete and trainer. A well known wrestler in his home country, he was part of a group of Icelanders that showcased Glíma at the 1908 Summer Olympics. He was later a coach for the Canadian Winnipeg Falcons that won the first ever gold medal in Ice hockey at the 1920 Summer Olympics.

== Early life ==
Guðmundur was born in Litluströnd at Mývatn on 15 April 1883 to Friðfinna Davíðsdóttir and Sigurjón Guðmundsson. He was the second youngest of 10 children. After being raised in poverty, he moved to Reykjavík in 1905, at the age of 22. There he started training Glíma, an Icelandic wrestle, which he quickly mastered. On 2 August 1907, he participated in the Konungsglíman (English: The King's wrestle) at Þingvellir, a Glíma competition in the honor of King Frederik VIII of Denmark's visit to Iceland. He was one of seven Icelanders who showcased Glíma at the 1908 Summer Olympics.

== Move to Canada ==
After studying sports training and therapy in England, Guðmundur moved to Winnipeg in Canada in 1914 where he learned Greco-Roman wrestling and Ice hockey. He served in the Canadian military from 1916 to 1919, becoming a sergeant in the 27th Battalion of the Canadian Expeditionary Force during the First World War. In 1920, he was the trainer of the Winnipeg Falcons when it won the gold medal in ice hockey for Canada at the 1920 Summer Olympics.

== Return to Iceland and prison sentence ==
Guðmundur returned to Iceland in 1920 and became a well known trainer in Glíma and track&field. He was a member of the Independent Order of Good Templars and a staunch believer in abstinence from alcohol and drugs. In January 1924, Guðmundur was charged to the police by a man named Steindór Sigurðsson, for ill treatment of patients in Litli-Kleppur, a psychiatric hospital where Guðmundur worked, and for trying to entice him into having sexual intercourse with him, a violation of the Icelandic sodomy law at the time. Steindór later withdrew the charges, claiming that bootleggers had paid him to implicate Guðmundur to those crimes as he was hurting their business. Nonetheless, the police investigation continued and trial started on 28 February the same year with 14 witnesses called. Guðmundur was acquitted of ill treatment of patients but was sentenced to eight months in prison for having sexual relations with another man. He served three months of the sentence before being set free. He was the only person to have served a prison sentence for violating the Icelandic sodomy law.

In 1930, Guðmundur started working in the sports movement again. In 1942 he started training Glíma at Íþróttafélag Reykjavíkur and in 1948, he was part of the training staff that followed the Icelandic Olympic athletes that competed at the 1948 summer Olympics.

== Death ==
Guðmundur died on 14 January 1967, at the age of 83. He was buried 5 months later, on 14 June, at his family plot close to Mývatn.
