= Ice hockey at the 2007 Winter Universiade =

Ice hockey at the 2007 Winter Universiade includes only a men's event.

== Group stage ==
While the 2007 Winter Universiade took place in Torino, Italy, the ice hockey matches were played in Torre Pellice municipality and in Tazolli Torino.

== Group A ==
Standings

Country	G	W	T	L	P	GF–GA
Kazakhstan	5	4	1	0	9	40-14
Finland	5	3	1	1	7	37-14
Italy	5	3	0	2	6	23-08
Czech Republic	5	2	0	3	4	23-18
Japan	5	2	0	3	4	21-22
Great Britain	5	0	0	5	0	03-71

=== 18 January 2007 ===
Czech Republic	12-0	Great Britain
Japan	4-9	Finland
Kazakhstan	3-1	Italy

=== 19 January 2007 ===
Japan	4-5	Kazakhstan
Great Britain	0-10	Italy
Finland	3-2	Czech Republic

=== 21 January 2007 ===
Czech Republic	4-5	Kazakhstan
Italy	2-3	Japan
Great Britain	1-22	Finland

=== 22 January 2007 ===
Japan	5-3	Czech Republic
Kazakhstan	20-1	Great Britain
Finland	3-2	Italy

=== 24 January 2007 ===
Great Britain	1-7	Japan
Kazakhstan	4-4	Finland
Italy	7-0	Czech Republic

== Group B ==
Standings

Country	G	W	T	L	P	GF–GA
Canada	4	3	1	0	7	29-02
Russia	4	3	1	0	7	19-06
Slovakia	4	2	0	2	4	18-14
United States	4	1	0	3	2	09-15
South Korea	4	0	0	4	0	02-40

=== 18 January 2007 ===
United States	0-5	Canada
Slovakia	13-0	South Korea

=== 19 January 2007 ===
Russia	8-0	South Korea
Slovakia	3-2	United States

=== 21 January 2007 ===
Russia	4-2	Slovakia
South Korea	0-14	Canada

=== 22 January 2007 ===
United States	2-5	Russia
Canada	8-0	Slovakia

=== 24 January 2007 ===
South Korea	2-5	United States
Canada	2-2	Russia

Placement Games

=== 5th Place Game ===
==== 25 January 2007 ====
Italy	1-2 PS	Slovakia

=== 7th Place Game ===
==== 25 January 2007 ====
Czech Republic	3-0	United States

=== 9th Place Game ===
==== 25 January 2007 ====
Japan	5-2	South Korea

== Medal Round ==
=== Semifinals ===
==== 26 January 2007 ====
Kazakhstan	1-3	Russia
Canada	2-1	Finland

=== Final Game ===
==== 27 January 2007 ====
Canada	3-1	Russia

=== Bronze Game ===
==== 27 January 2007 ====
Kazakhstan	5-2	Finland
