= Albert Pudas =

Finnish-Canadian ice hockey player and coach

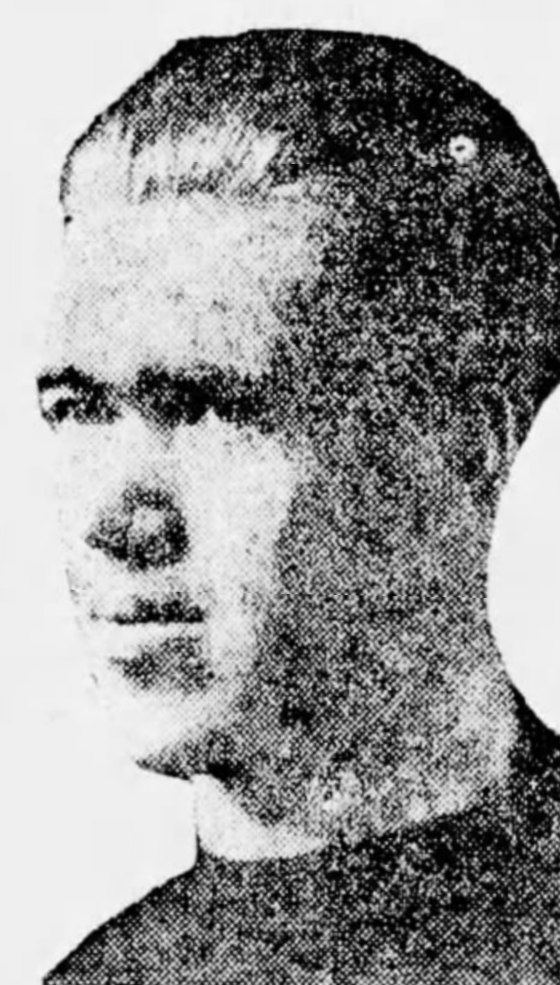
- Born: February 17, 1899; Siikajoki, Grand Duchy of Finland
- Died: October 28, 1976 (aged 77); Thunder Bay, Ontario, Canada
- Height: 5 ft 10 in (178 cm)
- Weight: 160 lb (73 kg; 11 st 6 lb)
- Position: Winger
- Shot: Right
- Played for: Toronto St. Patricks
- Playing career: 1921–1928

Juho Albert Pudas (originally Putaansuu) (February 17, 1899 – October 28, 1976) was a Finnish-born Canadian ice hockey player and coach. He was the first Finnish-born hockey player in the National Hockey League, and played 4 games for the Toronto St. Patricks during the 1926–27 season. Following his hockey career Pudas was active in the capacity of referee.

== Biography ==
Pudas moved to Canada at the age of 18 months. He began his hockey career in Port Arthur, Ontario with the Pascoes, Ports, and later, the Port Arthur Bearcats. On October 28, 1926, Pudas accepted a contract offer from the Toronto St. Pats, along with fellow Bearcats Bill Brydge, Danny Cox and Lorne Chabot. Pudas was recalled December 29, 1926, by the Toronto St. Pats (renamed the Maple Leafs that same season on February 14, 1927) to play four games. These four games made Pudas the first Finnish-born player to play in the NHL.

In 1936, Pudas coached the Port Arthur Bearcats who represented Canada in the Winter Olympics in Garmisch-Partenkirchen in Bavaria, Germany. Canada won a silver medal with Pudas as coach (the only medal Canada won at these games).

== Career statistics ==
=== Regular season and playoffs ===
			Regular season					Playoffs
Season	Team	League	GP	G	A	Pts	PIM	GP	G	A	Pts	PIM
1921–22	Port Arthur Bruins	TBSHL	—	—	—	—	—	—	—	—	—	—
1922–23	Port Arthur Bruins	MHL	16	17	8	25	5	2	1	0	1	0
1923–24	Port Arthur Bruins	MHL	16	11	2	13	2	2	1	0	1	2
1924–25	Port Arthur Bruins	MHL	20	3	3	6	—	10	11	10	21	13
1925–26	Port Arthur Bruins	MHL	20	11	2	13	20	9	7	6	13	18
1926–27	Toronto St. Patricks	NHL	4	0	0	0	0	—	—	—	—	—
1926–27	Windsor Bulldogs	Can-Pro	18	10	2	12	18	—	—	—	—	—
1926–27	Hamilton Tigers	Can-Pro	9	8	0	8	2	2	3	0	3	0
1927–28	London Panthers	Can-Pro	10	2	2	4	4	—	—	—	—	—
1927–28	Stratford Nationals	Can-Pro	1	0	0	0	0	—	—	—	—	—
1927–28	Detroit Olympics	Can-Pro	19	4	1	5	0	2	0	0	0	0
Can-Pro totals			57	24	5	29	24	4	3	0	3	0
NHL totals			4	0	0	0	0	—	—	—	—	—
